= 1922 in the Belgian Congo =

- Decades: 1900s; 1910s; 1920s; 1930s; 1940s

The following lists events that happened during 1922 in the Belgian Congo.

== Incumbent ==
- Governor-general – Maurice Lippens

== Events ==
=== General ===
Date	Event
	Alphonse Engels is appointed deputy governor-general of Congo-Kasaï
January	Georges Van der Kerken is appointed deputy governor-general of the province of Équateur (acting for Charles Duchesne).
16 January	The Société Ciments du Katanga is created by royal decree to supply cement to the rapidly growing Union Minière du Haut-Katanga (UMHK) and other companies in southern Katanga and the two Kasais.

== Births ==
- 22 February – Georges Yhambot, Congolese planter and politician

== See also ==
- Belgian Congo
- History of the Democratic Republic of the Congo

== Sources ==
- "Congo (Kinshasa) Provinces", Rulers.org
- Pary, J., Les matériaux de construction, l'industrie Katangaise. Réalisation et prospective, 1955-1960.
