= 1931 in the Belgian Congo =

- Decades: 1910s; 1920s; 1930s; 1940s; 1950s

The following lists events that happened during 1931 in the Belgian Congo.

== Incumbent ==
- Governor-general – Auguste Tilkens

== Events ==
Date	Event
	Orgaman Group, a food production and distribution company, is founded.
	L'Écho du Katanga is founded.
	Rodolphe Dufour is appointed interim governor of Katanga Province.
3 January	Mission sui juris of Bikoro is established
1 April	Apostolic Vicariate of Kisantu formed from part of the Apostolic Vicariate of Koango
1 July	Société des Chemins de Fer Vicinaux du Congo opens the line from Komba to Buta
September	Louis Postiaux (1882–1948) is appointed governor and deputy governor-general of Katanga Province.
21 November	First section of the Kivu Railway is inaugurated.

== See also ==
- Belgian Congo
- History of the Democratic Republic of the Congo

== Sources ==
- Archives d’Auguste Verbeken – HA.01.0192 (PDF), Tervuren: Musée royal de l’Afrique centrale
- Ballong, Stéphane (27 May 2014), "RD Congo : le ras-le-bol fiscal des patrons", Jeune Afrique
- "Congo (Kinshasa) Provinces", Rulers.org
- Lederer, André (2012), Les belges à l'étranger (in French), archived from the original on 21 September 2020
- Mukala Kadima Nzuji (1984), La littérature zaïroise de langue française: 1945-1965 (in French), Paris: Éditions Karthala, ISBN 978-2-86537-100-6
