= List of governors of Équateur (former province) =

Belgian Congo Provinces in 1920

Équateur / Coquilhatville from 1933

The present Province of Équateur

This List of governors of Équateur (former province) includes governors of the former province of Équateur/Evenaar, created in the Belgian Congo on 20 August 1917. It also includes commissioners of the Équateur District, created in 1888 in the Congo Free State, the precursor of the province.

In a 1933 reorganization Équateur was renamed Coquilhatville/Coquilhatstad province, losing an area in the south roughly equivalent to the present Mai-Ndombe to the new Léopoldville province. On 27 May 1947 the province regained the name of Équateur/Evenaar. It became an autonomous province of the Congo republic on 30 June 1960.

On 14 August 1962 Équateur was split into the provinces of Cuvette Centrale, Ubangi, and a centrally administered portion that became Moyen-Congo on 5 February 1963. On 25 April 1966 Cuvette Centrale, Moyen-Congo and Ubangi were reunited as Équateur province. On 11 July 2015 Équateur was split into the present provinces of Équateur, Mongala, Nord-Ubangi, Sud-Ubangi and Tshuapa.

== Équateur Station (1883–1888) ==
Équateur Station, which would become the present city of Mbandaka, was established for the International African Association by Alphonse van Gèle and Camille Coquilhat in 1883 on the left bank of the Congo River below the mouth of the Ruki River. The station heads were:

- Alphonse van Gèle (1883–1884),
- Guillaume Casman (December 1884 – May 1885)
- Georges-Guillaume Pagels (May–June 1885)
- Camille Van den Plas (1 July 1885)
- Edward James Glave (December 1885)
- Georges-Guillaume Pagels (March–April 1886)

At the end of 1885 Charles Liebrechts was made responsible for the Équateur region. In 1888, Guillaume François Van Kerkoven commanded the two districts of Ubangi-Uele and Équateur.

== District of Équateur (1888–1917) ==
The district commissioners were:

Start	End	Commissioner
25 June 1889	1890	Guillaume Van Kerckhoven (1853–1892)
December 1890		Charles-François-Alexandre Lemaire (1863–1925)
1 April 1893	1895	Victor-Léon Fievez (1853–1939)
1895	1898	Gustave-Émile Sarrazyn (1864–1915)
1898	1901	René-Elisée-Charles-Louis Dubreucq (1869–1914)
1901	1904	Guillaume-Antoine-Jean-Clément de Bauw (1865–1914)
17 February 1904	January 1905	Gustave-Eugène-Henri Stevens (1866–1928)
18 December 1904	11 September 1907	Albéric-Constantin-Edouard Bruneel (1863–1914)
1907	1908	Alexis Bertrand (1870–1946)
November 1908	July 1916	Fernand-Louis-Amélie Borms (1870–1952)

== First Équateur Province governors (1917–1962) ==
The governors (or equivalent) of the first Équateur Province from 1917 to 1962 were:

Province	Start	End	Officeholder	Title
Équateur/Evenaar	2 August 1917	December 1919	Georges Moulaert (d. 1958)	Deputy governor-general
Équateur/Evenaar	December 1919	25 October 1921	Alphonse Engels (1880–1962)	Deputy governor-general
Équateur/Evenaar	1921	4 October 1924	Charles Duchesne (1881–1945)	Deputy governor-general (interim to 1922)
Équateur/Evenaar	January 1922	September 1922	Georges Van der Kerken (1888–1953)	Deputy governor-general (acting for Duchesne)
Équateur/Evenaar	4 October 1924	1925	W.E. Parker	Deputy governor-general (interim)
Équateur/Evenaar	1925	24 March 1933	Charles Duchesne	Governor and deputy governor-general
Équateur/Evenaar	1927	1928	J. Jorissen	Governor and deputy governor-general (acting for Duchesne)
Équateur/Evenaar	1929	1930	J. Jorissen	Governor and deputy governor-general (acting for Duchesne)
Coquilhatville/Coquilhatstad	1933	1934	J. Jorissen	Commissioner
Coquilhatville/Coquilhatstad	11 July 1934	1935	E. Van de Cappelle (1881–1937)	Commissioner
Coquilhatville/Coquilhatstad	1935	1941	Eugène J.F. Henry	Commissioner
Coquilhatville/Coquilhatstad	1941	1945	Eugène J.F. Henry	Governor
Coquilhatville/Coquilhatstad	1945	1947	Van Hoeck	Governor (interim)
Équateur/Evenaar	1947	1950	F. Wenner (Note: The governor F. Wenner from 1947–1950 was not François Wenner, former governor of Lusambo, who is named as an honorary governor in 1949.)	Governor
Équateur/Evenaar	1950		Luc Breuls de Tiecken (b. 1900)	Governor (1st time)
Équateur/Evenaar	1950		Albert Gille	Governor
Équateur/Evenaar	1950		Luc Breuls de Tiecken	Governor (2nd time)
Équateur/Evenaar	1950	1951	Pierre Nauwelaert (1903–1969)	Governor
Équateur/Evenaar	1951	1953	Luc Breuls de Tiecken	Governor (3rd time)
Équateur/Evenaar	1953		Nicolas Muller (b. 1903)	Commissioner (1st time)
Équateur/Evenaar	1953	July 1954	Maurice De Ryck (1900–1964)	Governor
Équateur/Evenaar	1954	1955	Nicolas Muller	Commissioner (2nd time)
Équateur/Evenaar	1955	1956	Georges Schmit (b. 1908)	Governor
Équateur/Evenaar	1956		Nicolas Muller	Governor (3rd time)
Équateur/Evenaar	1956	1958	Odon Spitaels (b. 1912)	Governor
Équateur/Evenaar	1957		Alphonse De Valkeneer (1898–1973)	Governor (acting for Spitaels)
Équateur/Evenaar	1958	30 June 1960	Alphonse De Valkeneer	Governor
Équateur/Evenaar	30 June 1960	14 August 1962	Laurent Eketebi (b. 1936)	President

== Temporary successors (1962–1966) ==
The governors (or equivalent) of Cuvette Centrale, Ubangi and Moyen-Congo between 1962 and 1966 were:

=== Cuvette Centrale ===
Start	End	Officeholder	Title
September 1962	25 April 1966	Léon Engulu	President (from October 1965, governor)

=== Moyen-Congo ===
Start	End	Officeholder	Title
6 April 1963	June 1964	Laurent Eketebi	President (de facto from 15 September 1962)
April 1963	30 July 1963	Denis Akundji President of secessionist province of	Bumba
23 June 1964	10 August 1965	Augustin Engwanda	President
10 August 1965	25 April 1966	Denis Sakombi (1929–1985)	Governor

=== Ubangi ===
Start	End	Officeholder	Title
September 1962	20 July 1965	Alfred Nzondomyo	President
20 July 1965	25 April 1966	Michel Denge	Governor

== Reunited Équateur Province governors (1966–2015) ==
The governors (or equivalent) of the united Équateur Province from 1966 until it was split up in 2015 were:

Start	End	Officeholder	Title
25 April 1966	3 January 1967	Léon Engulu	Governor
3 January 1967	9 August 1968	Jonas Mukamba (b. 1931)	Governor (1st time)
9 August 1968	12 March 1969	Denis Paluku (1936–2014)	Governor
12 March 1969	5 August 1969	Édouard Bulundwe (b. 1932)	Governor
5 August 1969	23 December 1970	Henri-Désiré Takizala (1936–2000)	Governor
23 December 1970	19 March 1974	Oscar Ngoma (from 1972, Ngoma Ntoto Bwangi)	Governor, from 1972 Commissioner
19 March 1974	23 June 1975	Mbala Mbabu	Commissioner
23 June 1975	21 February 1978	Loposo Nzela Balombe	Commissioner
21 January 1978	18 January 1980	Namwisi Ma Nkoy	Commissioner
18 January 1980	27 August 1980	Mpambia Musanga Bekaja (b. 1935)	Governor (1st time)
27 August 1980	19 March 1983	Mukamba Kadiata Nzemba (= Jonas Mukamba)	Governor (2nd time)
19 March 1983	21 March 1984	Kititwa Tumansi Benga Tundu (1929–2000)	Governor
21 March 1984	1 January 1985	Sabi Ngampoub Mubiem	Governor (interim)
1 January 1985	26 April 1986	Mpambia Musanga Bekaja	Governor (2nd time)
26 April 1986	20 July 1988	Mokolo Matamba Moful (d. 1989)	Governor
20 July 1988	11 January 1990	Kisanga Kabongelo	Governor
12 January 1990	June 1990	Fundu Kota (b. 1943)	Governor
1990		Lwabanji Ngabo Lwasi	Governor (interim)
		Basembe Emina	Governor
		Mpambia Musanga Bekaja	Governor (3rd time)
1992	1997	Njoku Ey'Obabe	Governor
March 1997	12 May 1997	Mukobo Mundende Popolo (1937–2015)	Governor
April 1997	1999	Gabriel Mola Motia (b. 1957)	Governor
1999	200.	Christian Eleko Botuna (1950–2007)	Governor
January 2002	26 May 2004	Jean-Bertrand Ewanga (b. 1952)	Governor
26 May 2004	24 February 2007	Yves Mobando Yogo (b. 1955)	Governor
24 February 2007	February 2009	José Makila Sumanda (b. 1959)	Governor
February 2009	April 2013	Jean-Claude Baende (b. 1963)	Governor (interim to November 2009)
April 2013	22 July 2013	René Bofaya	Governor (interim)
22 July 2013	14 December 2014	Louis Alphonse Koyagialo (1947–2014)	Governor
5 September 2013	29 October 2015	Sébastien Impeto Mpengo	Governor (acting for Koyagialo to 14 December 2014)

== See also ==
- Lists of provincial governors of the Democratic Republic of the Congo
