= 1932 in the Belgian Congo =

- Decades: 1910s; 1920s; 1930s; 1940s; 1950s

The following lists events that happened during 1932 in the Belgian Congo.

== Incumbent ==
- Governor-General – Auguste Tilkens

== Events ==
Date	Event
	The Empain group and the Société Minière de la Tele create Cobelmin, a mining company that prospected and exploited mines for several companies that had obtained concessions in the CFL mining sector.
	Exploitation of the Kamituga deposits in the south of Kivu Province began.
January	Gaston Heenen (1880–1963) is appointed governor and deputy governor-general of Katanga Province.
17 August	Paul Ermens becomes governor and deputy governor-general of Congo-Kasaï.
11 November	Société des Chemins de Fer Vicinaux du Congo opens the line from Buta to Titulé.
December	Société des Chemins de Fer Vicinaux du Congo opens the line from Andoma to Zobia.
14 December	Étienne Tshisekedi, future prime minister of Zaire, is born in Luluabourg.

== See also ==
- Belgian Congo
- History of the Democratic Republic of the Congo

== Sources ==
- Archives du Groupe Empain (PDF), Association pour la valorisation des archives d’entreprises - asbl
- "Congo (Kinshasa) Provinces", Rulers.org
- Kyanga Wasso, Athanase (3 May 2013), SOMINKI en liquidation (PDF) (in French), Bukavu
