= 1929 in the Belgian Congo =

- Decades: 1900s; 1910s; 1920s; 1930s; 1940s

The following lists events that happened during 1929 in the Belgian Congo.

== Incumbents ==
- Governor General – Auguste Tilkens

== Events ==
| Date | Event |
|---|---|
| | Lubumbashi Sport, a football club, is founded. |
| | Benguela railway comes into operation to Luau at the border to the Belgian Congo. |
| 19 June | Joseph Beernaert is appointed governor and deputy governor-general of Congo-Kasaï |

== See also ==
- Belgian Congo
- History of the Democratic Republic of the Congo

== Sources ==
- Hance, William A.; van Dongen, Irene S. (October 1956). "The Port of Lobito and the Benguela Railway". Geographical Review. 46 (4). American Geographical Society: 460–487. doi:10.2307/212105. JSTOR 212105.
- Kubusch, Lars; Schöggl, Hans (2021), Congo-Kinshasa (DR Congo, Zaire) - Foundation Dates of Clubs, Rec.Sport.Soccer Statistics Foundation
