= 1962 in the Republic of the Congo (Léopoldville) =

- Decades: 1960s

The following lists events that happened during 1962 in the Republic of the Congo (Léopoldville).

== Incumbent ==
- President: Joseph Kasa-Vubu
- Prime Minister: Cyrille Adoula

== Events ==
Date	Event
January	André Lubaya becomes president of Kasaï Province.
April	Revolutionary Government of Angola in Exile based in Léopoldville is founded by Holden Roberto of the National Liberation Front of Angola
10 May	Kivu Province is broken into the provinces of Maniema, North Kivu and South Kivu.
9 June	Barthélemy Mukenge becomes president of Kasaï Province.
2 July	Diocese of Mahagi established from the Diocese of Bunia
14 August	Équateur province is split into the provinces of Cuvette Centrale, Ubangi, and a centrally administered portion that became Moyen-Congo Province on 5 February 1963.
14 August	Province of Congo Central is formed from part of Léopoldville Province.
14 August	Kasaï Province is divided into five new provinces: Lomami, Luluabourg, Sankuru, Sud-Kasaï and Unité Kasaïenne.
12 September	Samy Badibanga, future prime minister of the Democratic Republic of the Congo, is born in Léopoldville.
15 September	Laurent Eketebi becomes de facto President of what will become Moyen-Congo Province.

== See also ==
- Republic of the Congo (Léopoldville)
- History of the Democratic Republic of the Congo
- Congo Crisis

== Sources ==
- Congo Protestant Council (1959), Zaire Church News, p. 21
- "Congo (Kinshasa) Provinces", Rulers.org
