= 1925 in the Belgian Congo =

- Decades: 1900s; 1910s; 1920s; 1930s; 1940s

The following lists events that happened during 1925 in the Belgian Congo.

== Incumbents ==
- Governor General – Martin Rutten

== Events ==
Date	Event
	Kipushi Mine starts production.
	Compagnie sucrière Kwilu-Ngongo is created in the town of Kwilu Ngongo.
	Charles Duchesne is appointed governor and deputy governor-general of the province of Équateur.
March	Sonatra (Société Nationale des Transports Fluviaux au Congo) merges with the transport operations of the Compagnie Industrielle et de Transports au Stanley Pool (Citas) to create Unatra (Union nationale des Transports fluviaux).
April	Albert National Park is established, the core of what would become Virunga National Park.
2 July	Patrice Lumumba, first prime minister of the Republic of the Congo (Léopoldville), is born in Onalua in the Katako-Kombe Territory of the Kasaï Province .
5 October	Antoine Gizenga, future prime minister of the Democratic Republic of the Congo, is born in Mbanze.

== See also ==
- Belgian Congo
- History of the Democratic Republic of the Congo

== Sources ==
- "Congo (Kinshasa) Provinces", Rulers.org
- "Finasucre - Kwilo Ngongo Sugar Refining Mill", Industry About, 28 April 2019, archived from the original on 15 April 2021
- Harroy, J.P. (1993), "Contribution à l'histoire jusque 1934 de la création de l'Institut des parcs nationaux du Congo belge", Civilisations. Revue internationale d'anthropologie et de sciences humaines, 41 (41): 427–442, doi:10.4000/civilisations.1732
- "Union National des Transports Fluviaux (Unatra)", Origins of Value, Yale School of Management, 2012
