= 1924 in the Belgian Congo =

- Decades: 1900s; 1910s; 1920s; 1930s; 1940s

The following lists events that happened during 1924 in the Belgian Congo.

== Incumbents ==
- Governor General – Martin Rutten

== Events ==
Date	Event
	Evangelical Community of Kwango, a member of the Church of Christ in the Congo, is formed by the Unevangelised Tribe Mission in the Kwango area.

== See also ==
- Belgian Congo
- History of the Democratic Republic of the Congo

== Sources ==
- Communaute evangelique du Kwango, Stiftung Johannes a Lasco Bibliothek Grosse Kirche Emden
