= 1927 in the Belgian Congo =

- Decades: 1900s; 1910s; 1920s; 1930s; 1940s

The following lists events that happened during 1927 in the Belgian Congo.

== Incumbents ==
- Governor General – Martin Rutten, then Auguste Tilkens

== Events ==
Date	Event
1 January	Société des Chemins de Fer Vicinaux du Congo opens the line from Komba to Likati
September	Société des Chemins de Fer Vicinaux du Congo opens the line from Likati to Libogo
16 September	Société des Chemins de fer Léopoldville-Katanga-Dilolo is created, with construction and operation subcontracted to Compagnie du chemin de fer du bas-Congo au Katanga (BCK).
27 December	Auguste Tilkens replaces Martin Rutten as governor-general

== See also ==
- Belgian Congo
- History of the Democratic Republic of the Congo

== Sources ==
- BCK - KDL - Le site des chemins de fer du Katanga, 2010, archived from the original on 4 December 2010
