= Joseph Beernaert =

Belgian Soldier

Joseph-Edouard-Louis Beernaert

Governor of Congo-Kasaï
- In office 17 August 1932 – 30 September 1933
- Preceded by: Alphonse Engels
- Succeeded by: Paul Ermens

Personal details
- Born: 21 April 1883
- Died: 1950
- Occupation: Soldier, colonial administrator

Joseph-Edouard-Louis Beernaert (21 April 1883 – 1950) was a Belgian soldier who reached the rank of Lieutenant-General. He was governor of the province of Congo-Kasaï in the Belgian Congo from 1925 to 1929.

== Early career (1883–1929) ==
Joseph Beernaert was born on 21 April 1883. He was attached to the Ministry of Colonies in 1909. He made many trips to the Belgian Congo during his term of office. He was commissioner general, assistant to the governor of the province of Congo-Kasaï from 1925 to 1929. From 1928 he was secretary general, assistant to the governor general of the colony.

== Governor of Congo-Kasaï (1929–1933) ==
Beernaert replaced Alphonse Engels as governor and deputy governor-general of Congo-Kasaï on 19 June 1929. His headquarters were at Léopoldville. In 1931 there was an economic crisis in the Belgian Congo triggered by problems in Belgium, the primary market, and an overvalued currency, leading to reduced exports. The head tax (impôt indigène) increased, and villages were unable to pay it. In 1931 there were widespread disturbances in the Kwango District of Congo-Kasaï, which the Ministry of Colonies later attributed to new administrative structures, availability of Force Publique units and overreaction by administrators. Additional troops were transferred to Kwango and Kikwat, and the district administrations declared martial law in the most unsettled areas. The troops acted as punitive columns. At Mukuku in August 1931 troops killed 56 people in a single encounter. Word of the violence spread, and villagers fled before the columns reached them, leading to optimism among the authorities that the rebellion was calming down.

The Dengese people in particular were influenced by millenarian cults that talked of driving out the Europeans. In Équateur Province, Governor Charles Duchesne responded with limited police action, and by the end of February 1932 the crisis there was over. Beernaert was less sympathetic to the Dengese, and on 20 October 1932 declared a state of emergency under decrees of 1906 and 1920, applied martial law to five chefferies and dispatched troops to restore order. The commissioner of Sankuru District blamed fetishism, claiming that traditional religious views had been distorted into claims that expelling the Europeans would solve all problems. He sent Force Publique troops into Kole Territory to force the villages to submit to authority. Beernaert held office until 1933. His successor was Paul Ermens, appointed on 17 August 1932.

== Later career (1933–1950) ==
Beernaert was promoted to Major-General on 26 March 1939. Until 26 December 1939 he commanded the 1st Cavalry Division. On 26 December 1939 he was appointed General Officer Commanding 2nd Cavalry Division. In 1944 he was Inspector-General of the Army. He died in 1950.

== Sources ==
- "Beernaert, Joseph", Africamuseum.be
- "Congo (Kinshasa) Provinces", Rulers.org
- Steen Ammentorp, "Beernaert, Joseph-Edouard-Louis", generals.dk
- Thomas, Martin (20 September 2012), Violence and Colonial Order: Police, Workers and Protest in the European Colonial Empires, 1918-1940, Cambridge University Press, ISBN 978-0-521-76841-2
