= 1923 in the Belgian Congo =

- Decades: 1900s; 1910s; 1920s; 1930s; 1940s

The following lists events that happened during 1923 in the Belgian Congo.

== Incumbents ==
- Governor General – Maurice Lippens, then Martin Rutten

== Events ==
Date	Event
	Compagnie Minière des Grands-Lacs (MGL), a subsidiary of the Compagnie des Chemins de Fer des Grands Lacs (CFL), is established.
24 January	Martin Rutten replaces Maurice Lippens as governor-general
6 February	Alfred Moeller de Laddersous is promoted to commissioner general of Orientale Province.
December	Léon Guilain Bureau is appointed Governor and deputy governor-general of Katanga Province.

== See also ==
- Belgian Congo
- History of the Democratic Republic of the Congo

== Sources ==
- Archives du Groupe Empain (PDF), Association pour la valorisation des archives d’entreprises - asbl
- "Congo (Kinshasa) Provinces", Rulers.org
- Sohier, J. (8 January 1987), Biographie Belge D'Outre-mer, vol. VIII, Academie Royale des Sciences D'Outremer, pp. col.296–300 – via RAOS
