= 1934 in the Belgian Congo =

- Decades: 1910s; 1920s; 1930s; 1940s; 1950s

The following lists events that happened during 1934 in the Belgian Congo.

== Incumbents ==
- Governor-general – Auguste Tilkens, Pierre Ryckmans

== Events ==
Date	Event
26 February	Apostolic Vicariate of Boma is established
15 August	André Bo-Boliko Lokonga, future prime minister of Zaire, is born in Lobamiti, Bandundu Province.
14 September	Pierre Ryckmans replaces Auguste Tilkens as governor-general
29 September	N'Singa Udjuu, future prime minister of Zaire, is born in Banningville.
31 December	Société des Chemins de Fer Vicinaux du Congo opens the line from Zobia to Isiro

== See also ==
- Belgian Congo
- History of the Democratic Republic of the Congo
