= Alphonse De Valkeneer =

Belgian colonial administrator

Governor of Équateur
- In office 1957 – 30 June 1960
- Preceded by: Odon Spitaels
- Succeeded by: Laurent Eketebi

Personal details
- Born: 2 June 1898 Brussels, Belgium
- Died: 5 September 1973 (aged 75) Uccle, Belgium
- Occupation: Colonial administrator

Alphonse De Valkeneer (2 June 1898 – 5 September 1973) was a Belgian colonial administrator. He was the last Belgian governor of Équateur Province from 1957 to 1960 before the Belgian Congo became independent as the Republic of the Congo (Léopoldville).

== Early years ==
Alphonse-Jean-Joseph-Sylvain De Valkeneer was born in Brussels, Belgium on 2 June 1898. His parents were Sylvain De Valkeneer (1844–1930) and Jeanne Joséphine Versé (1853–1918). He studied the humanities, then on 26 November 1915 volunteered for the Belgian Army. He qualified as an artillery officer in Onivel, France, in 1917, then joined the 5B and 11th artillery regiments. He was in the forces that occupied the Rhineland from 11 December 1918 to 1 February 1919.

== Colonial administrator ==
De Valkeneer joined the Cie du Kasai (Kasai Company) and served there for two terms, from 23 April 1929 to 27 May 1934. On 21 July 1936 he joined the government service of the Belgian Congo, starting as a temporary territorial administrator. He was promoted to territorial administrator 2nd class (1 July 1938). De Valkeneer was in the Force Publique of the Belgian Congo from 30 June 1940 to 6 November 1944. He was a commander of this force in Sankuru and Kabinda. He commanded the Lusambo territorial security battalion from 29 June 1941 to 6 November 1944, and participated in suppressing the mutiny of the XIV battalion in Lualabourg in February and March 1944, for which he was cited in the order of the day.

De Valkeneer was promoted to territorial administrator 1st class (1 July 1943), principal territorial administrator (1 June 1944), and assistant district commissioner (1 January 1949). He was district commissioner from 1 April 1953 to 31 December 1956, then provincial commissioner from 1 January 1957 to 31 March 1959. He became acting governor of Équateur in 1957 in place of Odon Spitaels. He was governor of Governor of Équateur from 1 April 1959 to 1 July 1960. He was succeeded by Laurent Eketebi, the first Congolese governor of the province.

De Valkeneer was involved in many veterinary matters, particularly in bovine brucellosis and the means to completely eradicate this illness. De Valkeneer married twice, first in 1931 to Suzanne Marie Alix Briard (1903–1964), then to Berthe Van Campenhout (1909–1987). He died in Uccle, Belgium, on 5 September 1973).

== Sources ==
- "Congo (Kinshasa) Provinces", Rulers.org
- de Rosenbaum, G. (3 November 1975), "VALKENEER (DE)", Biographie Belge d’Outre-Mer (PDF), vol. VII–B, Bruxelles: Académie royale des sciences d'Outre-mer, pp. col.373–374
- van Ruymbeke, Alain, "Alphonse DE VALKENEER", Geneanet
