= 1928 in the Belgian Congo =

- Decades: 1900s; 1910s; 1920s; 1930s; 1940s

The following lists events that happened during 1928 in the Belgian Congo.

== Incumbents ==
- Governor General – Auguste Tilkens

== Events ==
Date	Event
	Léonard Mulamba, future prime minister of the Democratic Republic of the Congo, is born
	King Albert I of Belgium inaugurates the voie national that links the Katanga mining region via rail and river transport to the Atlantic port of Matadi.
5 May	Gaston Heenen (1880–1963) is appointed governor and deputy governor-general of Katanga Province.
15 May	Société des Chemins de Fer Vicinaux du Congo open the line from Libogo to Bondo.

== See also ==
- Belgian Congo
- History of the Democratic Republic of the Congo

== Sources ==
- "Congo (Kinshasa) Provinces", Rulers.org
