= Léon Guilain Bureau =

Belgian soldier

Deputy governor-general and governor of Congo-Kasaï
- In office 18 October 1918 – 1922
- Succeeded by: Alphonse Engels

Deputy governor-general of Katanga
- In office December 1923 – 21 January 1928
- Preceded by: Martin Rutten
- Succeeded by: Gaston Heenen

Personal details
- Born: 12 August 1869 Spy, Belgium
- Died: 8 September 1954 (aged 85) Brussels, Belgium
- Occupation: Soldier, colonial administrator

Léon Guilain Bureau (12 August 1869 – 8 September 1954) was a Belgian soldier who served in administrative roles in the Ottoman Empire and the Belgian Congo. Between 1918 and 1928 he was deputy governor general in turn of Congo-Kasaï and Katanga.

== Early years ==
Léon-Guillain Bureau was born in Spy, Belgium on 12 August 1869. His parents were Hubert-Joseph Bureau and Anne-Marie Vigneron. He married Berthe Guiot. Bureau enlisted as a volunteer in the 12th Line Regiment on 2 February 1886. On 13 November 1899 he was admitted to the Military School, and on leaving was promoted to second lieutenant on 6 February 1892.

== Junior officer (1886–1898) ==
Bureau was assigned to the Carabiniers regiment, and technically spent his whole military career with that regiment. In practice he spent almost all his career detached from the regiment. On 4 December 1893 he was temporarily seconded to the Military Cartographic Institute, and a few days later left for the Congo. He became a 2nd lieutenant of the Force Publique of the Congo Free State and was assigned to the Ubangi-Bomu region, where Georges-Édouard Le Marinel was preparing an expedition to the Nile. The expedition was cancelled for political reasons, and Bureau returned to his regiment in Belgium. Bureau was promoted to lieutenant on 26 June 1898, and the next day was appointed secretary of the prosecution of the Auditor General of the Military Court. He held this position until June 1903.

== Turkey (1898–1909) ==
On 29 September 1898 Bureau was again temporarily seconded to the Military Cartographic Institute. He and three other officers were dispatched to Turkey to provide "technical assistance" to the Ottoman Empire in reorganizing the armed police of Rumelia. The Sultan had been pressured into this by the European powers after disturbances in Macedonia in 1902–03. Bureau was given the uniform and title of a major of the Ottoman Army. Following his duties in Macedonia he helped reorganize the police of the Thessaloniki region, then was assigned to the gendarmerie in Istanbul. On 26 March 1907 Bureau was promoted to staff captain (capitaine en second) in the Belgian army and was appointed inspector general and colonel of the police forces of European Turkey, and then director of the school that trained officers and police for this region. He held the Turkish title of Bey. In March 1909 Bureau returned to his regiment as a captain.

== Congo (1911–1928) ==
On 7 January 1911 Bureau was again seconded to the Military Cartographic Institute and placed at the disposal of the Minister of Colonies for service in the Congo. He went there with the rank of director and acting secretary general of the colony, and was soon made secretary general. The former Congo Free State had been annexed by Belgium as the Belgian Congo, and Bureau helped define a policy based on the Colonial Charter, and an administrative framework consistent with this policy and with the economic development of the colony. He was promoted to captain-commandant on 26 June 1911.

Bureau was in the Belgian Congo when World War I (1914–1918) broke out. He requested early leave so he could fight on the Yser Front, and disembarked at Le Havre on 1 February 1915. However, the Minister of Colonies told him he could render greater services in the Congo. He was promoted to major on 12 February 1915 and returned to Boma to help with the colony's war effort. In 1917 Bureau was made one the first vice-governors general of the Belgian Congo, along with Charles Tombeur, Adolphe De Meulemeester, Georges Moulaert and Martin Rutten. He was assistant to the governor general, and was acting governor general several times. He was promoted to lieutenant-colonel on 26 March 1918 and colonel in 1919 with eight Chevrons de front, usually awarded only for service in the front line.

Bureau was deputy governor-general of the newly created Congo-Kasaï province from 18 October 1918 to 1922. In May 1921 Rutten left for Europe. Bureau acted as governor general until Maurice Lippens, the new governor general, reached Boma. He was succeeded as governor of Congo-Kasaï by Alphonse Engels.

Bureau was deputy governor-general of Katanga Province from December 1923, succeeding Martin Rutten in this position. Bureau wrote to the colonial minister on 4 January 1924, forwarding Dr. Emile Lejeune's report on labor conditions in the Huileries du Congo Belge (HCB). He noted in his letter that, "Employers in Africa persist in blaming their failure to recruit workers on the indolence of the blacks, when the real cause is the fashion in which they treat those in their employ." He was promoted to Major General on 26 December 1926. Before leaving office Bureau presided over preparations in Elisabethville for the visit of King Albert and Queen Elisabeth in 1928. He was succeeded in Katanga on 21 January 1928 by Gaston Heenen.

== Retirement (1929–1954) ==
Bureau retired from the colonial service at his own request on 31 January 1929. He asked to be spared active service in the army due to poor health, and was allowed to retire from the army on 21 March 1929. On 26 June 1929 he was given the honorary title of Lieutenant General. In retirement he was president of the water distribution board of the Congo and administrator of the Kilo-Moto gold mines and the Jules Van Lancker Company. On 14 February 1934 Bureau was named as a member of the board of the University Institute of Overseas Territories in Antwerp. Pierre Ryckmans was president. As late as 1951 Bureau made a long journey to the Congo. He died in Brussels on 8 September 1954.

== Sources ==
- Belgium (1954), Belgisch staatsblad
- "Congo (Kinshasa) Provinces", Rulers.org
- Duchesne, Albert (7 March 1966), "BUREAU (Léon Guillain)", Biographie Belge d'Outre-Mer (in French), vol. VI, Académie Royale des Sciences d'Outre-Mer, pp. col. 145–147
- Garvey, Marcus (5 December 1995), The Marcus Garvey and Universal Negro Improvement Association Papers, Vol. IX: Africa for the Africans June 1921-December 1922, University of California Press, ISBN 978-0-520-91682-1
- Marchal, Jules (2008). "2: The Lejeune Report (1923)". Lord Leverhulme's Ghosts: Colonial Exploitation in the Congo. Translated by Martin Thom. Introduced by Adam Hochschild. London: Verso. p. 39. ISBN 978-1-84467-239-4.
