= 1926 in the Belgian Congo =

- Decades: 1900s; 1910s; 1920s; 1930s; 1940s

The following lists events that happened during 1926 in the Belgian Congo.

== Incumbents ==
- Governor General – Martin Rutten

== Events ==
Date	Event
	Capital of the colony moves from the port town of Boma to Léopoldville (present-day Kinshasa), 300 kilometres (190 mi) upstream along the Congo River.
July	Société des Chemins de Fer Vicinaux du Congo open the line from Aketi to Komba
16 July	Évariste Kimba, future prime minister of the Democratic Republic of the Congo, is born in the village of Nsaka, Katanga Province.
9 October	Alfred Moeller de Laddersous becomes governor and deputy governor-general of Orientale Province.

== See also ==
- Belgian Congo
- History of the Democratic Republic of the Congo
