= 1933 in the Belgian Congo =

- Decades: 1910s; 1920s; 1930s; 1940s; 1950s

The following lists events that happened during 1933 in the Belgian Congo.

== Incumbent ==
- Governor-General – Auguste Tilkens

== Events ==
Date	Event
1 October	Équateur Province is renamed Coquihatville Province, under a provincial commissioner. The first commissioner was J. Jorrissen.
1 October	Orientale Province is divided into Costermansville Province (later Kivu Province) and Stanleyville Province.
1 October	Georges Mortehan (1883–1955) becomes commissioner of Costermansville Province.
1 October	Rodolphe Dufour becomes commissioner of Stanleyville Province.
1 October	Congo-Kasaï province is divided into the provinces of Lusambo and Léopoldville.
1 October	Constant Wauters becomes commissioner of Lusambo Province.
1 October	Katanga Province is renamed Elisabethville Province. Amour Maron (1891–1948) is appointed commissioner.
12 November	Bernardin Mungul Diaka, future prime minister of Zaire, is born.

== See also ==
- Belgian Congo
- History of the Democratic Republic of the Congo

== Sources ==
- Bruneau, Jean-Claude (30 June 2009), "Les nouvelles provinces de la République Démocratique du Congo : construction territoriale et ethnicités", L'Espace Politique, 7 (2009–1), doi:10.4000/espacepolitique.1296
- "Congo (Kinshasa) Provinces", Rulers.org
- Lufungula, Lewono (1986), "Les gouverneurs de l'Équateur, 1885 - 1960", Annales Aequatoria, 7, Honoré Vinck: 149–166, JSTOR 25836402
