= 1930 in the Belgian Congo =

- Decades: 1910s; 1920s; 1930s; 1940s; 1950s

The following lists events that happened during 1930 in the Belgian Congo.

== Incumbent ==
- Governor-General – Auguste Tilkens

== Events ==
Date	Event
	First year of production for Minière des Grands Lacs Africains (MGL), when 25 kilograms (55 lb) of gold were mined.
14 October	Joseph-Désiré Mobutu, future president, born in Lisala.

== See also ==
- Belgian Congo
- History of the Democratic Republic of the Congo

== Sources ==
- Archives du Groupe Empain (PDF), Association pour la valorisation des archives d’entreprises - asbl
