= 1960 in the Republic of the Congo (Léopoldville) =

- Decades: 1960s
- See also: 1960 in the Belgian Congo

The following lists events that happened during 1960 in the Republic of the Congo (Léopoldville).

== Incumbents ==
- President: Joseph Kasa-Vubu

== Events ==
=== June ===
- June 30 - At 12:01 a.m. (0101 GMT), the Belgian Congo was proclaimed independent by Belgium's King Baudouin. The new Congolese prime minister, Patrice Lumumba, then delivered an angry speech about colonial rule.
- June 30 - Laurent Eketebi is appointed President of the province of Équateur.

=== July ===
- July 5 - The army in the newly independent Republic of Congo mutinied and attacked European civilians after the Belgian commander, Lt. Gen. Émile Janssens, tried to enforce discipline. Europeans fled from Léopoldville where the mutiny started.
- July 9 - The Belgian national airline Sabena began airlifting Belgian citizens out of the Republic of Congo. Over the next three weeks, 25,711 flew home.
- July 11 - Moise Tshombe declared the Congolese province of Katanga independent, and, taking advantage of the Congo's dismissal of Belgian officers from the Congolese Army, asked for military aid from Belgium. The Congo's prime minister Patrice Lumumba asked the United Nations to intervene in the crisis.
- July 14 - By an 8–0 vote, the United Nations Security Council authorized the sending of U.N. forces to restore order in the Congo and in Katanga, and to request that Belgium withdraw its troops. The first U.N. forces arrived from Tunisia the next day.
- July 17 - Joseph Kasavubu and Patrice Lumumba, unhappy with the United Nations' progress in pressuring Belgium to withdraw its troops from the former Belgian Congo, added a new dimension to the crisis with an ultimatum: If Belgian troops did not withdraw within 48 hours, the Congolese leaders would invite the Soviet Union to send troops to the African nation.

=== August ===
- August 8 - The Mining State of South Kasai, with its capital at Bakwanga (now Mbuji-Mayi), seceded from the rest of the Republic of Congo, by declaration of Chief Albert Kalonji. Congolese troops recaptured Bakwanga two weeks later on August 24.
- August 28 - The United Nations announced that it had sufficient peacekeeping troops in the Congo to preserve order, and demanded that the last of Belgium's forces there be withdrawn.

=== September ===
- September 3 - In the bloodiest day of fighting since the Congo became independent of Belgium, more than 300 people were killed and 700 wounded as Congolese troops invaded the "Mining State" that had been declared by Albert Kalonji in the Kasai Province. The cities of Mwene Ditu and Laputa had been retaken by government troops loyal to Patrice Lumumba, while Kasai rebels were marching to defend the major city of Bakwanga (now Mbuji-Mayi).
- September 5 - President Joseph Kasavubu announced on Radio Leopoldville that he had fired Prime Minister Patrice Lumumba. An hour later, Lumumba announced on the same station that he intended to stay, and then fired Kasavubu. Congo's Army Chief of Staff Joseph Mobutu sent troops to place Lumumba under house arrest while contemplating the future of Kasavubu's regime.
- September 14 - Colonel Joseph Mobutu, the 30 year old Army Chief of Staff, staged a military coup, while allowing Joseph Kasavubu to continue as President. Two days later, Mobutu gave the Soviet Union's forces 48 hours to depart.
- September 16 - Joseph Kasavubu expelled two Communist ambassadors from the country.

== See also ==
- Republic of the Congo (Léopoldville)
- History of the Democratic Republic of the Congo
- Congo Crisis
- 1960 in the Belgian Congo
