= 1961 in the Republic of the Congo (Léopoldville) =

- Decades: 1960s

The following lists events that happened during 1961 in the Republic of the Congo (Léopoldville).

== Incumbent ==
- President: Joseph Kasa-Vubu
- Prime Minister: Antoine Gizenga – Joseph Iléo – Cyrille Adoula

== Events ==
Date	Event
	Forminière, a lumber and mining company, ceases to operate.
	SM Sanga Balende, a football club, is founded as Union Sud-Kasaienne in Mbuji-Mayi, Kasai.
	The American School of Leopoldville is founded
2 January	Anicet Kashamura (b. 1928) becomes president of Kivu Province.
9 February	Joseph Iléo becomes prime minister.
21 February	United Nations Security Council Resolution 161 urges the UN to immediately take measures to prevent the occurrence of civil war in the Congo, even the use of force is necessary.
24 June	Roman Catholic Diocese of Popokabaka is established from the Diocese of Kisantu.
2 August	Cyrille Adoula is appointed prime minister
11 September	Diocese of Ikela is established from the Metropolitan Archdiocese of Coquilhatville
18 September	Jean Miruho is reappointed president of Kivu Province.
11–12 November	In the Kindu atrocity thirteen Italian airmen, members of the United Nations Operation in the Congo (ONUC), sent to pacify the country ravaged by civil war, are murdered.
24 November	United Nations Security Council Resolution 169 deprecates the secessionist activities in Katanga as well as armed action against United Nations forces and insists that those activities cease.

== See also ==
- Republic of the Congo (Léopoldville)
- History of the Democratic Republic of the Congo
- Congo Crisis

== Sources ==
- "Congo (Kinshasa) Provinces", Rulers.org
- Kubusch, Lars; Schöggl, Hans (2021), Congo-Kinshasa (DR Congo, Zaire) - Foundation Dates of Clubs, Rec.Sport.Soccer Statistics Foundation
