= 1963 in the Republic of the Congo (Léopoldville) =

- Decades: 1960s

The following lists events that happened during 1963 in the Republic of the Congo (Léopoldville).

== Incumbent ==
- President: Joseph Kasa-Vubu
- Prime Minister: Cyrille Adoula

== Events ==
Date	Event
	DR Congo women's national basketball team, DR Congo men's national under-18 basketball team and DR Congo men's national basketball team are founded
	Free University of the Congo is founded by protestant missionaries, now the University of Kisangani.
	Action sociale CHECHE, a work training center in Bukavu, is founded by a Jesuit priest
	Orientale Province is broken up into Kibali-Ituri, Uélé and Haut-Congo provinces.
5 February	Centrally administered portion of Équateur province becomes Moyen-Congo
13 June	Félix Tshisekedi, future president of the Democratic Republic of the Congo, is born in Léopoldville.

== See also ==
- Republic of the Congo (Léopoldville)
- History of the Democratic Republic of the Congo
- Congo Crisis

== Sources ==
- Université de Kisangani, AUF – Agence universitaire de la Francophonie, archived from the original on 2006-10-14
