= Léon Engulu =

Congolese politician (1934–2023)

Léon Engulu Baangampongo Bakokele Lokanga

President, then Governor of Cuvette Centrale Province
- In office September 1962 – 25 April 1966
- Preceded by: Laurent Eketebi (as governor of Équateur)
- Succeeded by: self (as governor of Équateur)

Governor of Équateur
- In office 25 April 1966 – 3 January 1967
- Preceded by: self (as governor of Cuvette Centrale)
- Succeeded by: Jonas Mukamba Kadiata Nzemba

Governor of Kivu
- In office 3 January 1967 – 9 August 1968
- Preceded by: Denis Paluku
- Succeeded by: Léonard Monga

Governor of Katanga
- In office 1968–1970
- Preceded by: Denis Paluku
- Succeeded by: Henri-Désiré Takizala

Minister of Public Works
- In office 1970–1974

Minister of Agriculture and Rural Development
- In office 1977–1979

Minister of the Interior
- In office 1990–1991

Senator
- In office 2003–2018

Personal details
- Born: 1 April 1934 Coquilhatville, Belgian Congo
- Died: 4 February 2023 (aged 88) Kinshasa, Democratic Republic of the Congo
- Party: Union des Mongo
- Occupation: Politician

Léon Engulu, or Engulu Baangampongo Bakokele Lokanga (Note: Léon Engulu took the name Engulu Baangampongo Bakokele Lokanga during Mobutu's Zairianization program.) (1 April 1934 – 4 February 2023) was a politician from the Democratic Republic of the Congo. He was prominent in the politics of Équateur Province in the period leading up to and following independence in 1960, and was governor of various provinces between 1962 and 1970. From 1970 to 1997 he occupied various senior positions in the governments of president Mobutu Sese Seko. From 2003 to 2018 he was a senator.

== Early years ==
Léon Engulu was born on 1 April 1934 in Coquilhatville (Mbandaka), in the province of Équateur, Belgian Congo. He was of Mongo ethnicity. He was the eldest of a family of three children. He began his professional career in 1954 under the Belgian Congo as a commis territorial, which at the time corresponded to a minister today.

On 8 March 1960, a provincial executive college was created in Coquilhatville (Équateur Province) composed of Laurent Eketebi, Sebastien Ikolo and Leon Engulu. Engulu participated in the Belgo-Congolese Round Table Conference in Brussels in 1960 as a member of the executive college and vice-president of the UNIMO party, which he founded in January 1960 with Justin Bomboko and Eugène Ndjoku. Ndjoku was the main delegate and Engulu was the substitute.

After independence the first provincial government was formed as of 30 June 1960 through an agreement between UNIMO (Union des Mongo) and PUNA (Parti de l'Unite Nationale), the PNP (Parti National du Progres) having been shattered. Laurent Eketebi of PUNA, son of Mongo and Ngombe parents, was acceptable to voters from those two large ethnic groups. He was made president, while Léon Engulu of UNIMO was minister of the interior.

After the decomposition of Équateur into the "provincettes" of Cuvette Centrale, Moyen Congo and Ubangi, Engulu was president of Cuvette Centrale from September 1962 to August 1965, then governor of Cuvette Centrale from August 1965 to April 1966. Équateur was reconstituted and placed under Engulu as governor from 25 April 1966 to 3 January 1967. During his term of office Engulu worked on unifying the province. He created a Ministry of National Reconstruction, and tried to improve maintenance of the roads, the backbone of the economy.

On 29 December 1966, it was announced that Orientale Province had elected Foster Manzikala as governor. He had formerly been governor of Kibali-Ituri. However, General Mobutu had stipulated that governors must serve in a province other than their province of origin, so Manzikala was appointed governor of Katanga Province. The other governors were Paul Muhona, Kasaï-Oriental; Vital Moanda, Kivu; François Lwakabwanga, Bandundu; Jonas Mukamba, Equateur; Léon Engulu, Kasai-Occidental; Denis Paluku, Congo Central and Honoré Takizala, Orientale Province.

From 1967 to 1968, Engulu was governor of the province of Kivu. From 1968 to 1970, he was governor of Katanga.

== Mobutu government ==
In 1970, President Mobutu Sese Seko, who was his former classmate, brought him into the government as Minister of Public Works until 1974. In 1973, rather briefly, he became vice-president of the Republic in charge of Administration of the territory alongside Jean Nguza Karl-i-Bond, in charge of Foreign Affairs. In 1974, he also became a member of the Political Bureau of the Popular Movement of the Revolution (Mouvement Populaire de la Révolution, MPR) where in a famous speech, he compared Mobutu to Jesus Christ, qualifying him as the Black Messiah. From 1974 to 1977, he was Minister of Political Affairs (Internal Affairs) and suddenly became the first government figure after Mobutu. In 1977, he became vice-president of the council (like Jean Nguza Karl-I-Bond). From 1977 to 1979, Engulu headed the Ministry of Agriculture and Rural Development.

Engulu left the government following a misunderstanding with the Prime Minister (First State Commissioner) Mpinga Kasenda in 1979. From then on, he decided to resume university studies and was proclaimed a graduate in political science from the National University of Zaire, Lubumbashi Campus in 1981. Shortly before, he was appointed member of the Central Committee, high institution of the Republic after President Mobutu, and remained there until 1990. In 1985–1988, he lived for a time in Montreal, Canada, where he obtained a master's degree in political science, with a focus on Public Administration. When the transition started in 1990, he returned to the government as Minister of the Interior and Administration of the Territory, under Prime Minister Lunda Bululu, until 1991.

Shortly after, Engulu decided to leave the MPR and create the UNADE (National Union of Democrats). At the end of 1991, he became advisor to President Mobutu and following a dissension with other colleagues, he resigned from his post. He refused to exercise other public functions until Mobutu left. Under the prime ministerial office of Léon Kengo wa Dondo, however, he remained in great demand but refused any ministerial portfolio.

== Post-Mobutu ==
Engulu returned to politics at the end of 2003 as a senator in the Transitional Parliament after joining Jean-Pierre Bemba's MLC. Shortly afterwards, alongside Bomboko, he left the MlC and with José Endundo Bononge created UNADEC and became its president. At the end of January 2007, during the senatorial elections, he was elected Senator of Équateur, for the district of Tshuapa. In addition, he was the managing director of Cultures Congolaises, a company he inherited during the Zairianization period.

Léon Engulu Baangampongo Bakolele Lokanga gave a farewell address to the Senate in December 2018. He criticized the lack of clarity about distribution of mining revenue and the failure to maintain the roads. He then spoke out against the proposed change to the electoral laws of 2006 and 2011, which would disenfranchise many people. He attributed the multiplicity of political parties to the chronic misery of the rural tribes and clans and the appalling unemployment rates in the cities. He said of the President of the Republic, the Prime Minister, the Ministers, the Senators and the Deputies, that "we constitute a well paid oligarchy on an island in an ocean of misery, the misery of our population."

Engulu died in Kinshasa on 4 February 2023, at the age of 88.

== Sources ==
- Brassinne, Jacques (1989), "Les conseillers à la Table ronde belgo-congolaise", Courrier Hebdomadaire du CRISP (in French), 38–39 (1263–1264): 1–62, doi:10.3917/cris.1263.0001
- Da Graça, John (2017), Heads of State and Government, Springer, pp. 1221 pages, ISBN 9781349657711
- Eale Ikabe, Jean Pierre (6 April 2020), "87 ans d'existence : heureux anniversaire bokulaka du Grand-Equateur Léon Engulu !", Journal la Prospérité (in French)
- Engulu, Léon (2018), Discours de l'Honorable Sénateur Léon Engulu Baangampongo Bakolele Lokanga: Séance de clôture du Sénat en décembre 2018 (PDF), Senate
- "Le général Mobutu a profondément remanié son gouvernement", Le Monde (in French), 9 December 1970
- "Le Président Mobutu à remanié le gouvernement", Le Monde (in French), 11 March 1974
- "Les Nouveaux Gouverneurs Sont Définitivement Affectés A Leurs Province", Le Monde (in French), 5 January 1967
- Lufungula, Lewono (1989), "Les Gouverneurs de l'equateur (Zaire) de 1960 à 1988", Annales Aequatoria (in French), 10, Honoré Vinck: 65–90, JSTOR 25836509
- "Nomination de Nouveaux Gouverneurs", Le Monde (in French), 30 December 1966
- Postel-Vinay, Olivier (1 February 1975), "La "radicalisation de la révolution authentique"", Le Monde (in French)
- "Premier Bilan de la Catastrophe du Congo Plus de 250 Morts", Le Monde (in French), 14 March 1968
- "Remaniement Ministériel", Le Monde (in French), 25 February 1977
