= Jean-Bertrand Ewanga =

Congolese politician

Governor of Équateur (former province)
- In office January 2002 – 26 May 2004
- Preceded by: Christian Eleko Botuna
- Succeeded by: Yves Mobando Yogo

Member of the National Assembly
- Incumbent
- Assumed office 30 July 2006
- Constituency: Ikela

Personal details
- Party: Union for the Congolese Nation

Jean-Bertrand Ewanga Isewanga Iwoka is a Congolese politician and Union for the Congolese Nation Member of the National Assembly of the Democratic Republic of the Congo. He was the general secretary of the Union for the Congolese Nation, having resigned from the post 31 August 2016 due to his opposition to the participation of his party in the National Dialogue as stipulated in the UNITED resolute 2277. He was sentenced to one year in prison on 11 September 2014 for insulting the President. Ewanga's case was discussed in the UK Parliament where it garnered 28 signatures across party lines. He was previously aligned to the People's Party for Reconstruction and Democracy.

Ewanga is also a member of the political bureau for Together for Change, the opposition political coalition formed by former Katanga governor Moïse Katumbi to support his presidential bid in the upcoming 2018 presidential election.
