= Charles Duchesne =

Belgian colonial administrator

Charles-Marie-Nestor Duchesne

Governor of Équateur
- In office 1921 – 24 March 1933
- Preceded by: Alphonse Engels
- Succeeded by: J. Jorissen

Personal details
- Born: 1 September 1881 Molenbeek-Saint-Jean, Belgium
- Died: 17 November 1945 (aged 64) Saint-Gilles, Belgium
- Occupation: Lawyer, colonial administrator

Charles-Marie-Nestor Duchesne (1 September 1881 – 17 November 1945) was a Belgian lawyer and colonial administrator who was governor of Équateur Province in the Belgian Congo from 1921 to 1933.

== Early years ==
Charles-Marie-Nestor Duchesne was born in Molenbeek-Saint-Jean, Belgium, on 1 September 1881. His parents were Nestor Duchesne and Catherine Wenger. He married Rachel Bagot. His father was a horticulturalist, and soon after Charles was born was put in charge of the provincial horticultural school at Huy. Charles studied humanities at the Collège Saint Quirin and studied Law at the public University of Liège. He registered at the Huy bar.

== Magistrate ==
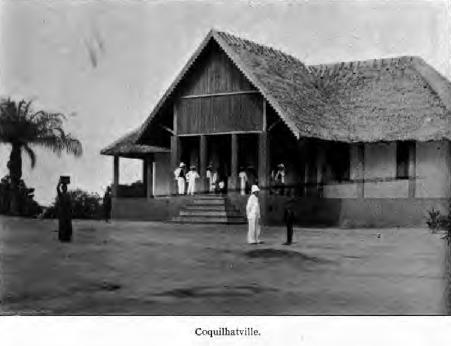
Coquilhatville at the turn of the century

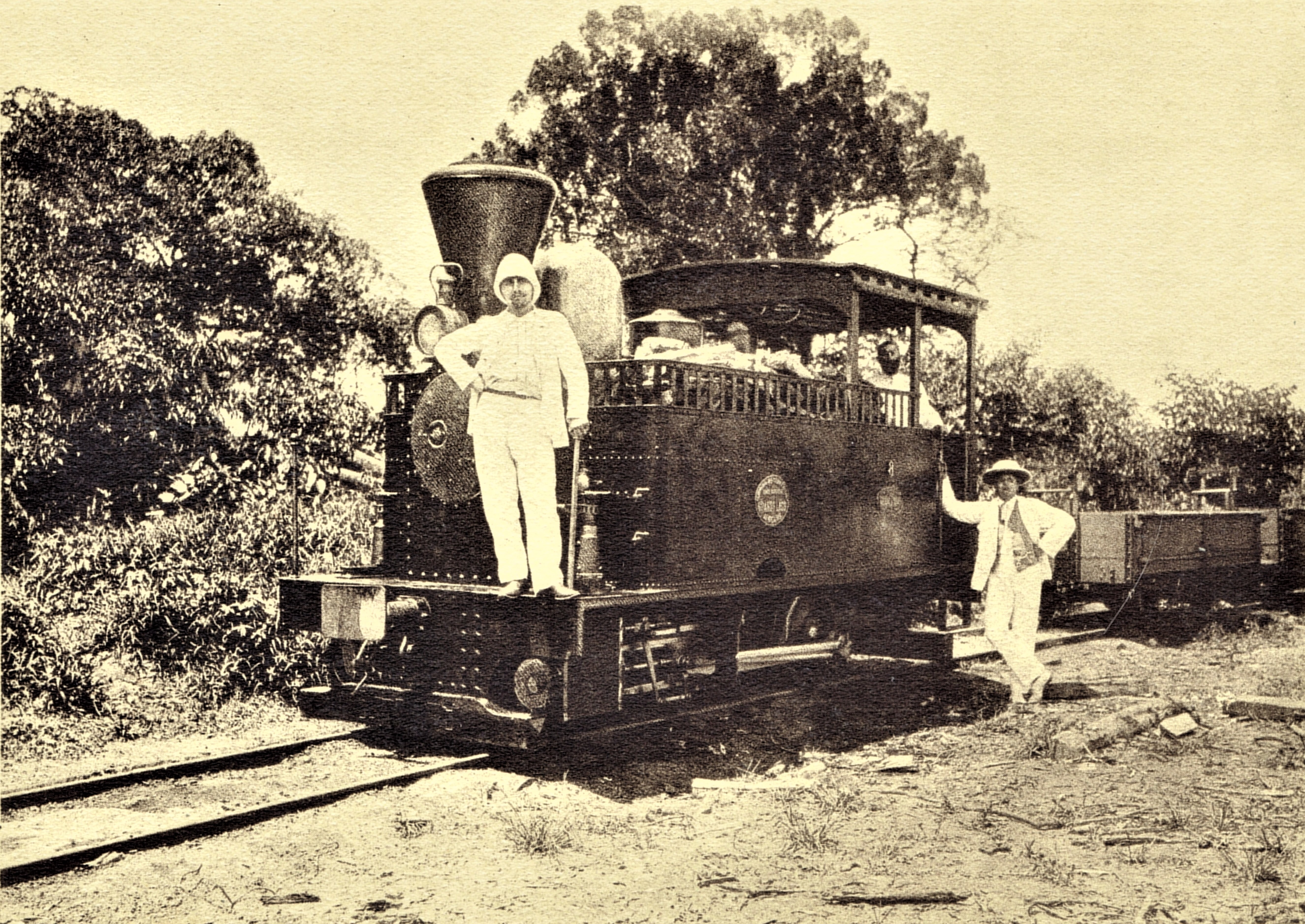
Coquilhatville, 1910, Chemins de fer du Congo Superieur steam locomotive

On 30 October 1907 Duchesne joined the service of the Congo Free State as a provisional magistrate. He embarked at Antwerp on 5 December 1907 and reached Boma on 31 December 1907, where he was appointed deputy state prosecutor at the court of first instance. On 19 May 1908 he was given the same function at the Public Prosecutor's Office of Coquilhatville. He occasionally served as a deputy judge at the court. After Belgium took over the region as the Belgian Congo he continued as an officer of the Public Prosecutor's Office at the Territorial Court of Nouvelle-Anvers and at the war councils of Mongala, Bangala and Lisala. During his many tours of judicial inspections he came to know the region that would become Équateur Province well.

At the end of his term Duchesne went down to Boma on 22 June 1910, where he served as a judge for a month before embarking for Belgium on 21 July 1910. In Belgium he presented his thesis to qualify as a permanent member of the Congo judiciary. At the end of his leave he was appointed deputy judge at the court of first instance of Coquilhatville on 14 December 1910. He reached Boma on 13 January 1911 and in rapid succession was appointed substitute for the state prosecutor at the court of first instance of Boma and the Matadi territorial court (14 January 1911), then deputy state prosecutor at the court of first instance of Boma (13 February 1911). holding these offices concurrently. He had to deal with the Arnold case, a scandal.

When the Arnold case was over, Duchesne went on to Coquilhatville, where he was deputy judge and deputy state prosecutor. He was instructed by Minister of Colonies Jules Renkin to assign the trial of the agents of the Belgian company for Commerce du Haut Congo, denounced in 1907 by Dr. Dörpinghaus, to one of his subordinates. Duchesne was recalled to Boma, where he had been appointed state prosecutor on 6 March 1912. On 20 February 1913 he was appointed deputy prosecutor general, and on 20 April 1913 was to the Kasaï region to inquire into the Cambier affair. After this had been resolved, Duchesne went on leave on 8 August 1913.

On 31 October 1913 Duchesne was appointed deputy attorney general at the Boma court of appeal. He assumed office in Boma on 25 January 1914. During this term Duceshne was sent on a mission of inspection to Haut-Congo, and in particular to Haut-Ituri, where problems included gold thefts from the state mines of Kilo and Moto, incursions from Uganda, and revolts by the local people. The tour took him through all of the Ituri mining region and a large part of the upper and lower Uele regions. Duchesne returned to Europe for statutory leave, leaving Boma on 20 September. He spent most of his leave in Bordeaux, but from time to time visited Minister Renkin in Sainte-Adresse, the administrative capital of Belgium during World War I (1914–1918).

On 11 November 1917 Renkin appointed him Assistant Secretary General to the Governor general. Duchesne returned to Boma on 17 May 1918 and served as secretary general until 28 May 1919, when he was appointed acting commissioner general, assisting the Governor of the Orientale Province while the commissioner general F. V. A. Tombeur was on leave. Soon after he acted as governor of Orientale Province while Adolphe De Meulemeester was on leave, and received Colonial Minister Louis Franck in Stanleyville on an inspection and study trip. On 17 August 1919 he was discharged from the general secretariat and named an assistant commissioner general. After de Meulemeester returned from leave, Duchesne took over the government of Équateur Province, which Alphonse Engels had just left.

== Governor ==
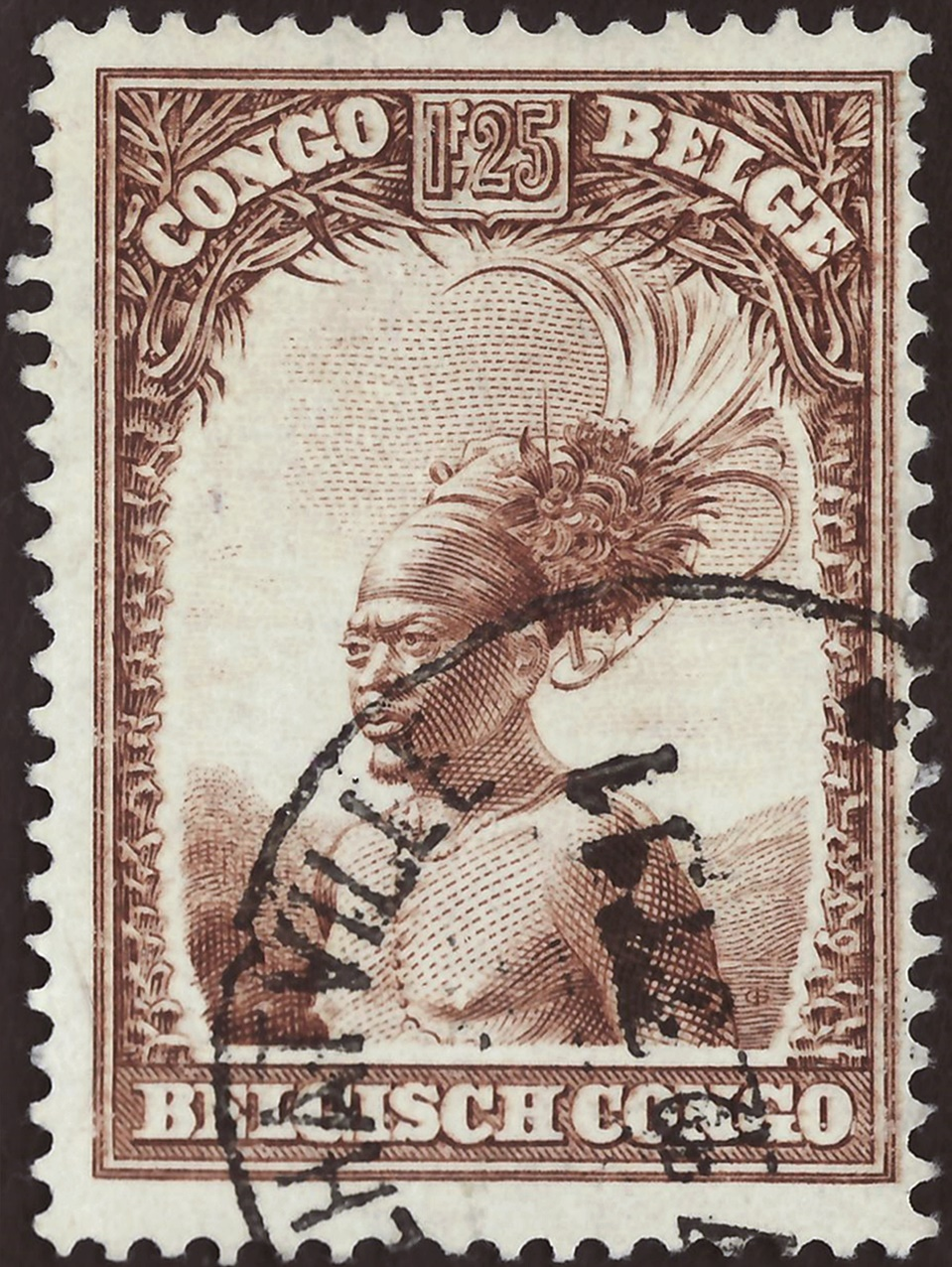
Stamp of Belgian Congo; 1931; postmarked in Coquilhatville

Duchesne was the first civilian governor of Equateur. He held office from 1921 to 1933, the longest of all the governors of Équateur. He succeeded Alphonse Engels (1880–1962) as interim governor-general of Équateur in 1921. Equateur was still a very poor province, rich in people and water, but poor in dry land that could be cultivated and poor in infrastructure. From 2–5 May 1921 Duchesne received Governor General Lippens, and discussed appeasement and compensation after the recent revolt of Mongo people, or related peoples, in the territories between Haute-Lukenie, Haute-Luilaka, Salonga, Lomela and the Block de la Busira grants to the Commerce du Haut-Congo company. The revolt highlighted the need to balance the interests of European enterprises who had acquired legal land rights and the local people, where the Congolese were the only available workers and also held immemorial rights to the land. Duchesne and his advisors developed and implemented a policy of "tripartite" contracts with ordinances of 1922, 1923 and 1927.

Duchesne had issues with the schools run by the Trappists in the province. He wrote in a letter of 27 December 1921, "In general, [there are] few pupils, who rarely complete their studies." He wrote of the Sisters who taught the girls, "Admirable for their dedication, that nevertheless achieves little success because the environment in which the girls live and the environment in which they will be called to live are not taken into account." He wrote of the bush schools, "Established in villages, where a catechist teacher is supposed to teach ... in general he is almost illiterate, limits himself to teaching a few religious ideas to a few children and this no more than intermittently." The Trappists in return accused Duchesne of removing many boys from school so they could work in farming, for the administration or for private enterprises.

Duchesne went on leave, departing from Boma on 22 January 1922. His leave expired at the start of July 1922, but he remained in Belgium to discuss various issues with the governor general, who had also returned on leave. Between January and September 1922 the lawyer Georges-Jules-Pierre Van der Kerken (1888–1953) acted as interim governor-general. Soon after his return to Coquilhatville in September 1933 Duchesne received Minister of State Count Henry Carton de Wiart, who later criticised the drowsiness of the provincial capital. He received Governor General Lippens on his way to the Orientale Province and the Ueles. The former governor of Katanga, Martin Rutten, called while on his way to take the post of governor general after Lippens had resigned. In 1923 Attorney General De Heem visited, and in June 1924 the journalist Roger de Chatelux ("Chalux") of the Nation belge. In September 1924 Henri Carton de Tournai, the new Minister of Colonies visited, and met governors Duchesne, Adolphe De Meulemeester of Orientale and Alphonse Engels of Congo-Kasai.

Duchesne made long journeys on foot or by canoe through the districts of Equateur. In 1923 he inspected the territories of Lisala, Modjamboli, Abumumbasi, Yakoma, Bosobolo, Bangi, Libenge, Gemena, Likimi and Nouvelle-Anvers. Soon after he went to meet de Meulemeester in Stanleyville and settled an exchange of populations with him to make both their territories more ethnically homogeneous. On 4 October 1924 Duchesne went on leave, deputizing Commissioner General W. E. Parker as acting governor. On 20 December 1924 he was formally named deputy governor general, governor of the Province of Équateur. He left from Antwerp on 2 April 1925, arrived in Boma on 19 April 1925 and at once set off for Coquilhatville.

During his sixth term in the Congo Duchesne began to see real improvements in the ports, roads, sanitation and urban infrastructure. His relations with the missionaries also improved. The Trappists of Westmalle had been replaced by a decision of the Pope by the Fathers of the Sacred Heart under Bishop Edouard van Goethem. There were also Lazarists at Lake Tumba, Scheutists in Bangala and Lake Leopold II, Fathers of Mill Hill in Lulonga, Franciscans in Ubangi, and Protestant missions in Upoto, Bolenge, Lake Tumba and other locations.

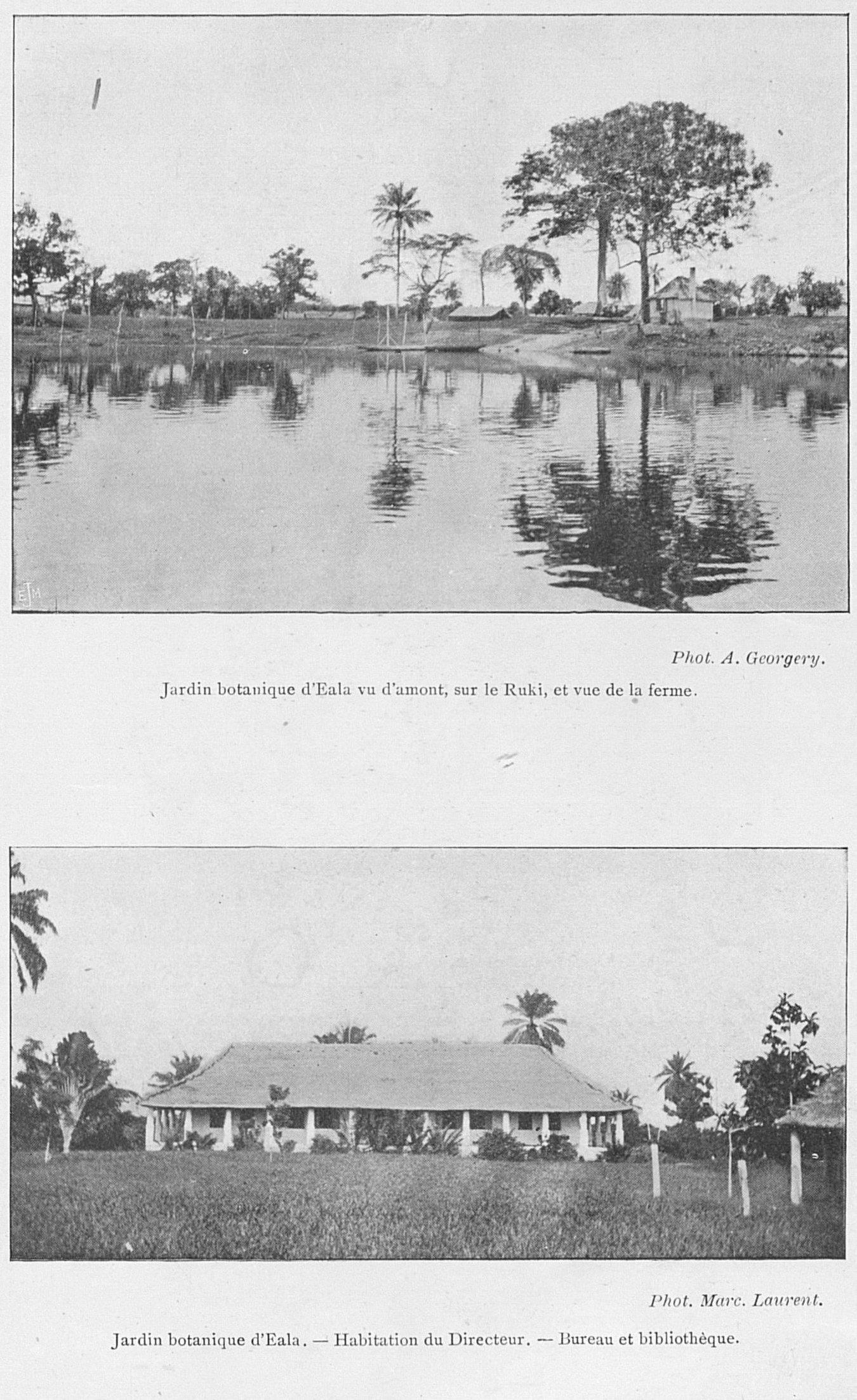
Eala botanical gardens

Distinguished visitors included Léopold of Belgium, Duke of Brabant, on 7 June 1925, who inspected troops and saw the sights accompanied by Duchesne. In September Coquilhatville was visited by André Gide, the filmmaker Marc Allégret and the Duchess of Treviso, attaché at the Pasteur Institute of Paris. Gide, in his Voyage au Congo, paid tribute to his hosts, admired the indigenous hospital that was nearing completions, and wrote of the achievements at the Jardin botanique d'Eala. The Duke of Brabant visited on his return trip on 30 October 1925. In August 1926 the former governor-general Lippens visited Coquilhatville and took part in a ceremony to inaugurate a Chamber of Commerce and the Équateur Labor Exchange (Bourse du Travail de l'Équateur). On 19 February 1927 Duchesne set up a committee, which he chaired, to coordinate raising and allocating funds for charitable purposes.

On 1 December 1927 Duchesne left Boma on leave, reaching Antwerp on 17 December 1927. J. Jorissen acted for Duchesne in 1927–28 and again in 1929–1930. On 29 February 1928 Duchesne married Rachel Bagot in Uccle. They embarked for the Congo on 19 June 1928 and reached Banane on 5 July 1928. On 10 August 1928 Duchesne was host to King Albert and Queen Elisabeth, accompanied by Governor General Tilkens. They toured the town, the Force Publique camp, the workers camps, hospitals and missions, the Eala botanical garden and the Inganda and Wendji industrial facilities. They dined with the leading people of the city, attended mass at the Cathedral, and the next day flew to Léopoldville. At this time the copal producers started to suffer from competition from synthetic copal. They pushed for higher output from their workers, and complained that the workers were becoming too arrogant, which they blamed on excessive leniency by the magistrates. The publicist and future statesmen Arthur Wauters visited the Congo at this time and passed through Coquilhatville. In his report he described the unrest caused by the conviction of a white man for violence against a native, and criticized efforts to persist in a market that was no longer viable. He approved of the conviction.

On 12 November 1929 Duchesne moved to Léopoldville to serve as acting governor general in the absence of Auguste Tilkens until 24 July 1930. He then went on leave, arriving in Antwerp on 9 September 1930. Although he was past retirement age, he was authorized by the minister to continue in office, returned to Banane on 27 February 1931 and went on Coquilhatville at once. During this period Commissioner General Jorissen was again in charge of Equateur.

In 1931 there was an economic crisis in the Belgian Congo triggered by problems in Belgium, the primary market, and an overvalued currency, leading to reduced exports. The head tax (impôt indigène) increased, and villages were unable to pay it. The Dengese people in particular were influenced by millenarian cults that talked of driving out the Europeans. Duchesne responded with a limited police action, and by the end of February 1932 the crisis there was over. 32 Dengese suspects had been arrested, with seven held on murder charges, six for attempted murder and the remainder for sedition. Duchesne was prompted to look for a solution to the problem of price fluctuations, which the indigenous harvesters saw as attempts to infringe on their rights, and considered a price stabilization system. He also pushed forward construction or improvement of roads in the province, including a motor road from Lisala to Libenge inaugurated in 1932. The Duke of Brabant and Princess Astrid visited in February 1933. Duchesne left office on 24 March 1933 and was succeeded by J. Jorissen as Commissioner of the newly created Coquilhatville Province.

== Later years ==
After his retirement Duchesne became involved in several businesses. He became chairman of the Société équatoriale congolaise Lulonga-Ikelemba, administrator of the Plantations de Lukolela, Kilo-Moto Gold Mines and Chemin de fer du Katanga, and Commissaire of the Société minière de Bafwaboli. He was president of the Professional Union of Cocoa Planters of Congo. Duchesne died in Saint-Gilles, Belgium on 17 November 1945. There was an Avenue Duchesne in Mbandaka (formerly known as Coquilhatville), but since 1972 it was called Avenue Mobutu.

== Publications ==
Publications by Duchesne included:

- Charles Duchesne (15 January 1924), "Note sur la main-d'œuvre au Congo belge (Note on the workforce in the Belgian Congo)", Revue Sincère, Brussels: 175–184
- Charles Duchesne (April 1925), "Du Droit des indigènes sur les palmeraies naturelles (Indigenous rights over natural palm groves)", Bulletin de la Société liégeoise d'Expansion, Liège
- Charles Duchesne (1928), "Main d'œuvre et produits de cueillette au Congo belge (Labor and harvested products in Belgian Congo)", Bulletin de la Société liégeoise d'expansion, Liège

== Sources ==
- Briffaerts, Jan (2014), "1.1.1. The Trappists of Westmalle on the Equator", When Congo Wants To Go To School – Catholic Missions in the Tshuapa Region, Rozenberg Quarterly
- "Congo (Kinshasa) Provinces", Rulers.org
- Jadot, J.-M. (21 March 1956), "DUCHESNE (Charles-Marie-Nestor)", Biographie Belge d'Outre-Mer, vol. V, Bruxelles: Académie royale des sciences d'Outre-mer, pp. col.272–285
- Lufungula, Lewono (1986), "Les gouverneurs de l'Équateur, 1885 - 1960", Annales Aequatoria, 7, Honoré Vinck: 149–166, JSTOR 25836402
- Odio Ons'osang (1992), "Histoire de Quelques Avenues de Mbandaka", Annales Aequatoria (in French), 13, Honoré Vinck: 125–136, JSTOR 25837049
- Thomas, Martin (20 September 2012), Violence and Colonial Order: Police, Workers and Protest in the European Colonial Empires, 1918-1940, Cambridge University Press, ISBN 978-0-521-76841-2
