= 1964 in the Republic of the Congo (Léopoldville) and the Democratic Republic of the Congo =

- Decades: 1960s

- Decades: 1940s; 1950s; 1960s; 1970s; 1980s
- See also: Other events of 1964; History of the DRC

The following lists events that happened during 1964 in the Republic of the Congo (Léopoldville) and the Democratic Republic of the Congo.

== Incumbents ==
- Republic of the Congo was renamed the Democratic Republic of the Congo on 1 August 1964.
- Head of State – Joseph Kasa-Vubu, Head of State of Congo (Léopoldville) (1960–1965)
- Prime Minister –
  - Cyrille Adoula, Prime Minister of Congo (Léopoldville) (1961–1964)
  - Moïse Tshombe, Prime Minister of Congo (Léopoldville) (1964–1965)

== Events ==
Date	Event
	Orientale Province is reconstituted by the rebel government of the short-lived People's Republic of Congo.
	Simba rebellion followers of Pierre Mulele make a failed attempt to invade Kamituga.
5 June	Augustin Matata Ponyo, future prime minister of the Democratic Republic of the Congo, is born in Maniema.
25 June – 10 July	Republic of the Congo (Léopoldville) constitutional referendum approved by 91% of voters; the country is renamed the "Democratic Republic of the Congo".
25 June – 10 July	Constitutional referendum approves the Constitution de Luluabourg.
10 July	Moïse Tshombe takes office as interim prime minister.
	Tshombe government announces parliamentary elections will be held by 30 March 1965.

== See also ==
- Congo Crisis
- First Congolese Republic
- History of the Democratic Republic of the Congo

== Sources ==
- "Congo (Kinshasa) Provinces", Rulers.org
- Kyanga Wasso, Athanase (3 May 2013), SOMINKI en liquidation (PDF) (in French), Bukavu, archived from the original (PDF) on 10 April 2021
- DRC: Background to the 1965 election, Electoral Institute for Sustainable Democracy in Africa
