= Georges Yhambot =

Congolese politician

Georges Yhambot (born 22 February 1922) was a Congolese planter and politician. He was elected to the Congolese Territorial Assembly in 1957, as a candidate of the African Socialist Movement (MSA). Soon after the election he and several of his followers left the MSA to join UDDIA.
