= Georges Moulaert =

Belgian colonial administrator

Georges Brunon Joseph Marie Moulaert

Deputy governor general of Équateur
- In office 2 August 1917 – 1919
- Succeeded by: Alphonse Engels

Personal details
- Born: 19 May 1875 Bruges, Belgium
- Died: 17 September 1958 (aged 83) Brussels, Belgium
- Occupation: Colonial administrator

Georges Brunon Joseph Marie Moulaert (19 May 1875 – 17 September 1958) was a Belgian colonial administrator. He was deputy governor general of Équateur Province in the Belgian Congo from 1917 to 1919. Later he became a businessman, head of several large enterprises in the Congo, and director of others. He drew criticism for his forced recruitment of Congolese workers in the Kilo-Moto gold mines.

== Early years (1875–1901) ==
Georges Brunon Joseph Marie Moulaert was born in Bruges, Belgium, on 19 May 1875. His father was a doctor, and the family was well to do. He studied the classics in school, then entered the Royal Military School in 1892. He became a 2nd lieutenant of the engineers on 22 December 1894, based in Antwerp at the Compagnie special des Pontonniers et des torpilleurs (Special pontoon and torpedo boat company).

Moulaert became a member of Antwerp's "Club africain", where he met colonials who had returned to the country. He decided to enter the service of the Congo Free State, and was accepted after an interview with Charles Liebrechts, secretary general of the Interior Department of the Free State. He was seconded to the Military Cartographic Institute, used by the Belgian state to make soldiers available to King Leopold II's private colony. Three of his brothers also spent time in the Congo, including Julien Moulaert and Maurice Moulaert.

== Colonial service (1901–1919) ==
=== Peacetime service (1901–1914) ===
Moulaert left for the Congo in January 1902 as a lieutenant of the Force Publique. That year he was promoted to captain of the Force Publique. He was assigned to the Fort de Shinkakasa, designed to protect the lower Congo, and completed the work on this structure. During leave in 1905 he drew up plans for additional works related to the fort. During this first tour of duty he also experimented with wireless telegraphy and in 1903 took part in the mission to delimit the border between the Congo Free State and the French Congo in the Manianga (Bas Congo) region.

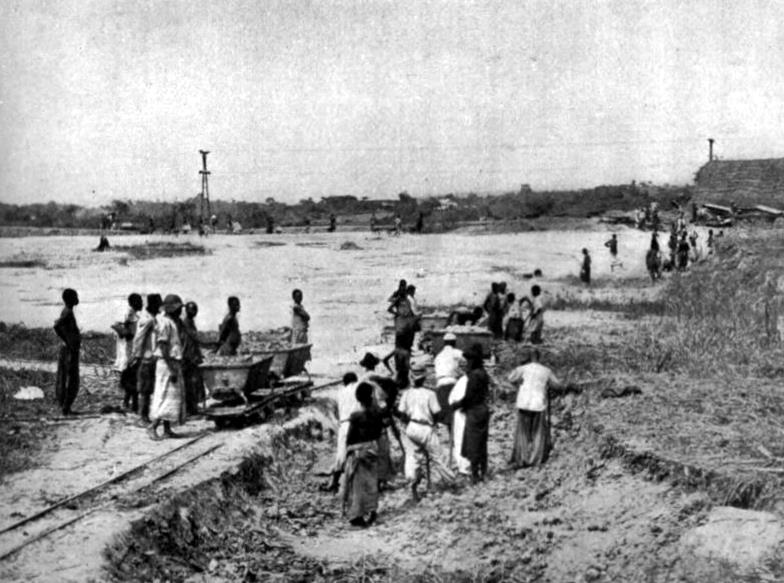
Workers at the Port of Léopoldville c. 1905

In 1905 Moulaert became a colonial civil servant with the rank of interim district commissioner 1st class. He was promoted to district commissioner 1st class in 1908. He became commissioner general in 1910. He was in charge of the Stanley Pool / Moyen Congo District (Léopoldville). He reorganized the urban supply system of Léopoldville and laid the foundations for its subsequent urban development. He developed a new vision for the city layout, organized the "indigenous" quarter and designed the port. In 1911 he requested that the port of Léopoldville, which was too close to the rapids, be moved upstream to the plain of Kinshasa. This was done twenty years later. Moulaert criticized the Catholic Church's fermes-chapelles (farm chapels), mistreatment of the Congolese, seizure of land and failure to pay taxes. His reports were used by socialists in Belgium in their campaign against the Catholic Church in the Congo.

In addition to his civil service duties, from 1907 to 1915 Moulaert was in charge of the Upper Congo navy. He met Prince Albert in 1909, when the prince was making a long tour of what had just become the Belgian Congo. From 1911 the king's special fund financed several of Moulaert's projects for river traffic, and in later years Moulaert directly requested the king's support. He created what grew into the beacon service and the hydrographic services. He built up the fleet, equipped the shipyard in Léopoldville and organized the lumber stations. He advocated coordination between different types of transport. This led to the establishment of Sociéte Nationale des Transports Fluviaux au Congo (Sonatra), Union Nationale des Transports Fluviaux (Unatra) and then Office des Transports Coloniaux (OTRACO) in 1935. He was promoted to Commandement du Génie (Commander, Engineers) in 1909.

In 1913 Moulaert married Louise Beckers (born 1883), daughter of an engineer. They had three children.

=== World War I (1914–1918) ===
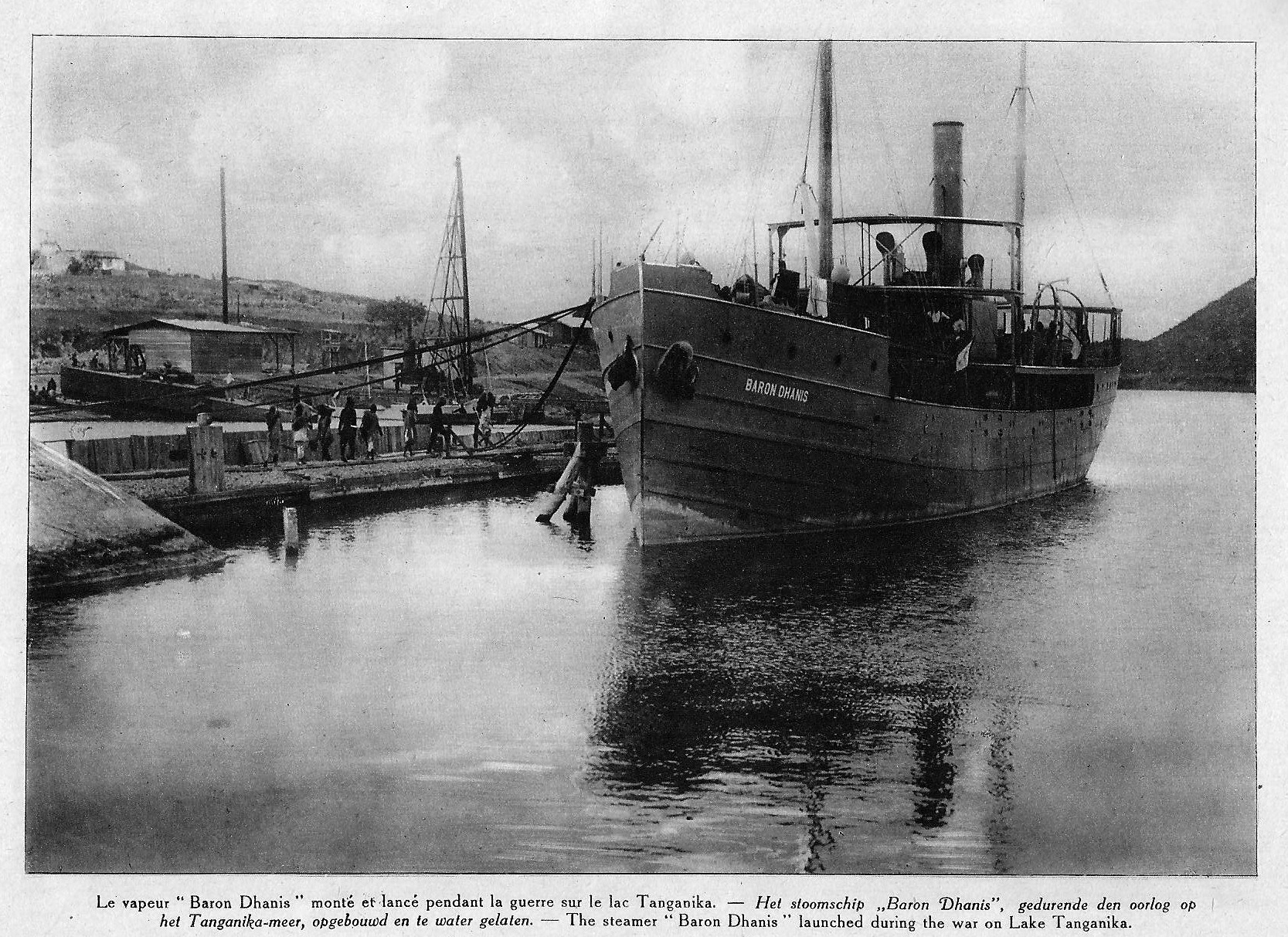
Baron Dhanis on Lake Tanganyika, 19 January 1916

In May 1914 Moulaert requested a second ten-year term in the colony, which was granted on 1 August 1914, a few days before the start of World War I (1914-1918). As commander of the Upper Congo Navy he organized and directed, from Léopoldville, the Belgian military expedition with the steamer Luxembourg which joined with the French in the Sangha operations in the Kamerun campaign against the Germans. In December 1914 he asked to be reinstated in the Belgian army so he could fight in Europe, petitioning the king directly, but was refused. In Léopoldville he argued about river and port infrastructure policy with his superior, the acting governor general Eugène Henry, and earned a reprimand.

To the east of the colony the Belgians and British were fighting the Germans in German East Africa. In January 1916 Moulaert was given command of a unit on Lake Tanganyika. In April 1916 he was promoted to lieutenant-colonel of the Force publique. He created a slipway and small port near the mouth of the Lukuga River. This was the haven for the small flotilla that won the Battle for Lake Tanganyika, and was the nucleus of the future city of Albertville. Moulaert again became involved in controversy when he fell out with Geoffrey Spicer-Simson, commander of the British forces on the lake, and with his own seniors. Henry even asked the Minister Jules Renkin to dismiss Moulaert, who again asked to serve on the Belgian Front. He left Africa for Europe in March 1917 and took command of the 1st Battalion of the 5th Engineer Regiment of the 5th Army Division. His battalion helped prepare the Houthulst Forest attack in the action of 22 October 1917.

=== Governor of Équateur (1917–1919) ===
On 20 August 1917, while he was serving on the Yser front Moulaert was appointed deputy governor general of the province of Équateur. The governor general and the minister of the colonies had refused to appoint him to head Congo-Kasaï, where he had served in the past. He embarked for the Congo in November 1917. On arrival in Coquilhatville Moulaert visited all the centers of the province and tried to address problems related to administrative organization, development of urban centers and exploitation of natural resources. However, he was frustrated by the central bureaucracy. In 1919 he left the Congo before a meeting of the Government Council, since he did not think provincial governors could achieve anything there. Moulaert was succeeded as deputy governor general by Alphonse Engels (1880–1962).

== Business career (1920–1958) ==
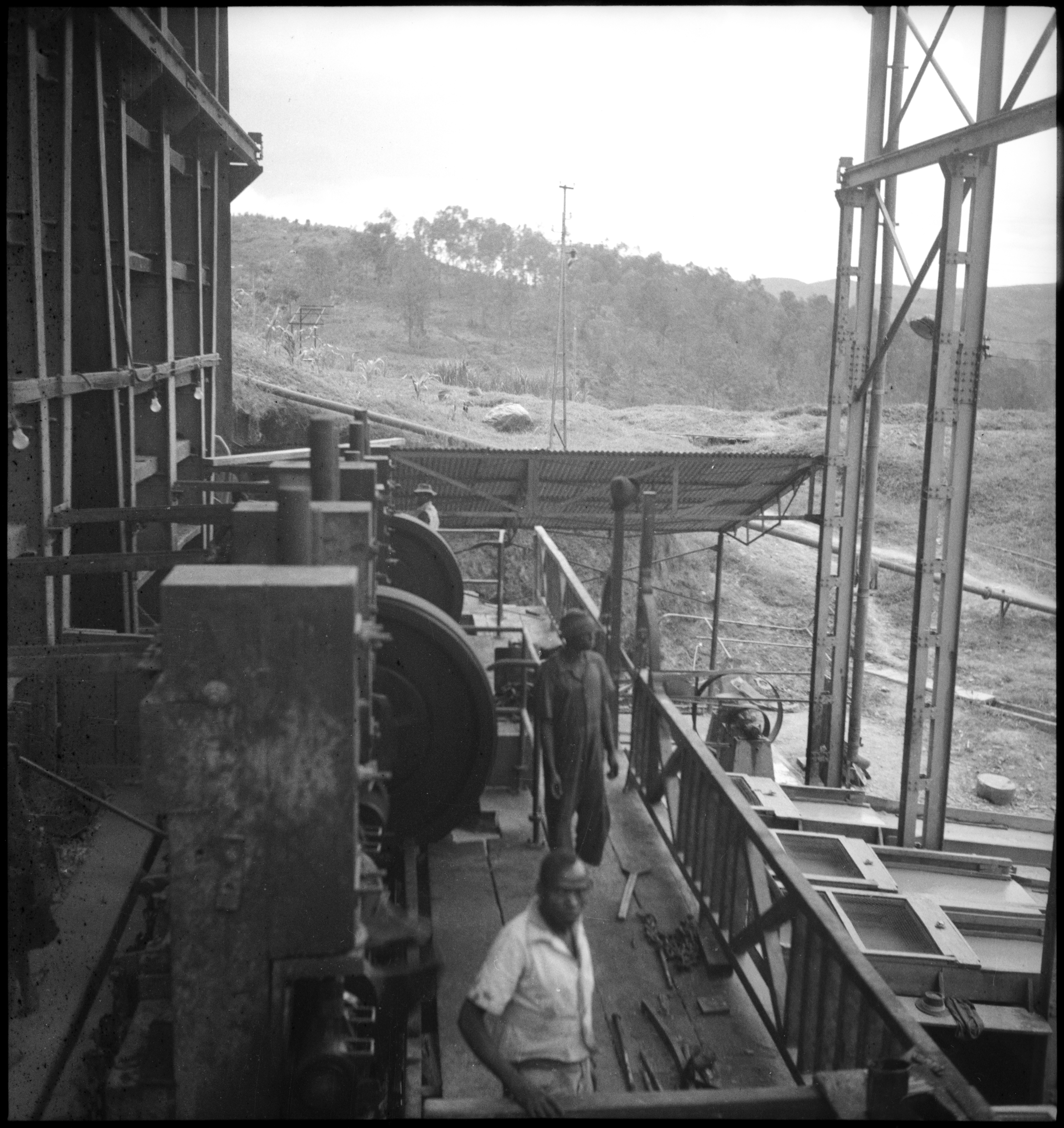
Two miners in Kilo-Moto c. 1941

At the end of 1919 Louis Franck, the Minister of the Colonies, gave Moulaert responsibility for the state mines at Kilo and Moto. These were located in largely hostile territory, with no communications and very primitive operations. Moulaert tackled improvements to roads, transport, medical support, supplies and crops, as well as mining installations, exploitation of alluvium and eluvium deposits, prospecting and research. Between 1920 and 1924 the company built 828 kilometres (514 mi) of roads, with many metal bridges, and installed 345 kilometres (214 mi) of telegraph and telephone lines. In 1924 a 1,500 horsepower (1,100 kW) hydroelectric power station was inaugurated at Soleniana and the grinding plant was electrified. Due to poor transport across the Congo region, particularly the Matadi-Léopoldville Railway, the company developed a route from the Uele River to the Nile to transport cotton, coffee and other products of the region.

In 1924 Moulaert returned to Brussels on a visit, and was appointed secretary general of a commission to examining the colony's transport. In 1926 the Régie industrielle des Mines d’Or de Kilo-Moto was converted to a Congolese limited liability company. Moulaert was made chairman of the board. He continued to head the company until 1947. Moulaert boosted gold production at Kilo-Moto, but his methods were questioned, particularly forced recruitment of Black workers, who totaled 10,012 in 1918 and over 40,000 in 1939. An official report drafted by Colonel Alexis Bertrand in 1931 said from 35% to 50% of able bodied adult men were forced to leave their homes to work the gold deposits, far above the official limit of 10% set by the Manpower Commission. This caused public controversy. Moulaert strongly defended "his" company, but criticism continued into the 1940s.

On 5 September 1928 he was a founding director of the Chantier Naval et Industriel du Congo, and remained a director until 1958. On 1 February 1929 Moulaert was involved in founding the Symaf company, and became chairman of the board. On 29 January 1932 he was one of the founders of Symétain, and on 25 November 1937 became president of Symétain. He remained on the boards of Symaf and Symétain until his death. In 1935 Moulaert visited Kalima, where mining was just starting, and drew up plans for offices, houses, a hospital and workers camps.

In the mid-1930s Moulaert obtained the rank of honorary reserve major general in the Belgian army. From 1937 to 1954 Moulaert was administrator of the Crédit Général du Congo, which in November 1948 became the Compagnie Financière Africaine. He held senior management positions in Société Congolaise de Gaz (Sogaz), Usine de textiles Texaf (Utexléo), Filatures et Tissages de Fibres au Congo (Tissaco), Société Commerciale Des Textiles (Socotex), Compagnie du Congo pour le Commerce et l’Industrie (CCCI) and Compagnie des Produits et des Frigorifères du Congo. From 1934 to 1938 he was president of the Association des Intérêts coloniaux belges (Association of Belgian Colonial Interests). In the late 1930s Rodolphe Dufour, commissioner of Stanleyville Province, was the target of concerted and virulent attacks from La Belgika and the Kilo-Moto Gold Mines delivered by their influential representatives André Gilson, also president of the Association of Belgian Colonial Interests, and by Moulaert. They claimed that Dufour failed to support colonial interests and caused great damage as a result.

Moulaert was a founding member of the Royal Colonial Institute (later the Royal Academy of Overseas Sciences), and became president of the institute in 1943. He died in Brussels on 17 September 1958.

== Publications ==
- Moulaert (G.) (1934), La campagne du Tanganika (1916-1917), Bruxelles: L’Édition universelle, p. 239
- Moulaert (G.) (1939), "38 années d'activité coloniale", Problèmes coloniaux d'hier et d'aujourd'hui. (Pages oubliées), Bruxelles: Charles Dessart Éditeur, p. 649
- Moulaert (G.) (1948), Souvenirs d'Afrique 1902-1919, Bruxelles: Charles Dessart, p. 243
- Moulaert (G.) (1950), Vingt années à Kilo Moto 1920-1940, Bruxelles: Charles Dessart, p. 296
- Moulaert (G.) (1931), "Province orientale.", Le problème de la main-d'œuvre au Congo Belge. Rapport de la Commission de la main-d'œuvre indigène 1930-1931., Rapporteur : Monsieur le Colonel Bertrand, Conseiller colonial, Bruxelles, Lesigne, p. 261

== Sources ==
- "Congo (Kinshasa) Provinces", Rulers.org
- Vanderlinden, R. (1968), "Moulaert (Georges-Brunon-Joseph-Marie)", Biographie Belge d'Outre-Mer, vol. VI, Bruxelles: Académie royale des sciences d'Outre-mer, pp. col.758–762, archived from the original on 2019-09-07
- Vanderlinden, Jacques (15 April 1994), Pierre Ryckmans 1891-1959: Coloniser dans l'honneur, De Boeck Supérieur, ISBN 978-2-8041-1881-5
- Vanthemsche, Guy (29 April 2013), "MOULAERT (George Brunon)", Biographical Dictionary of Overseas Belgians (in French), ARSOM
