= L'Écho du Katanga =

l'Écho du Katanga
- Type: Weekly
- Editor: Albert Decoster
- Founded: 1931
- Ceased publication: 1962
- Language: French language
- Headquarters: Elisabethville

L'Écho du Katanga ('The Echo of Katanga') was a French-language weekly newspaper published from Elisabethville, Congo-Leopoldville. l'Écho du Katanga was founded in 1929 by Jean Decoster. It replaced Journal du Katanga, which had been founded in 1911. The newspaper promoted European settlement in Congo. Later Decoster's son, Albert Decoster, took over the post as the editor of l'Écho du Katanga.

L'Écho du Katanga was closed down in 1962.

== See also ==
- Media of the Democratic Republic of the Congo
