= Kivu Railway =

Kalundu–Kamaniola
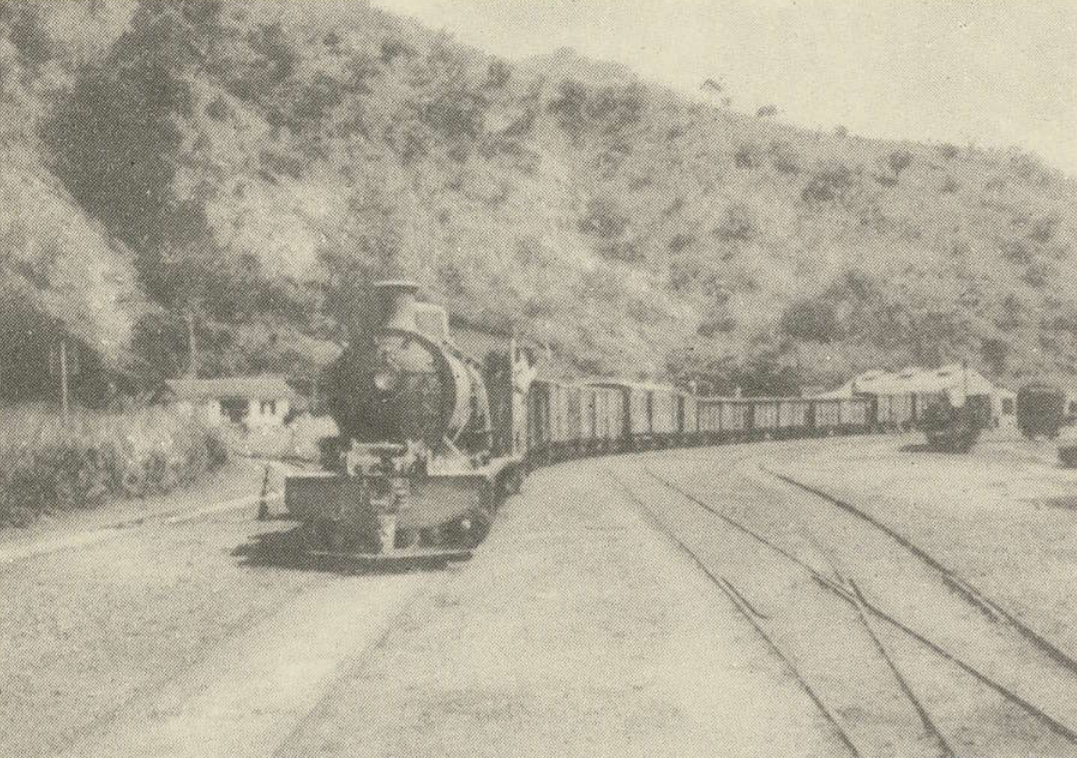
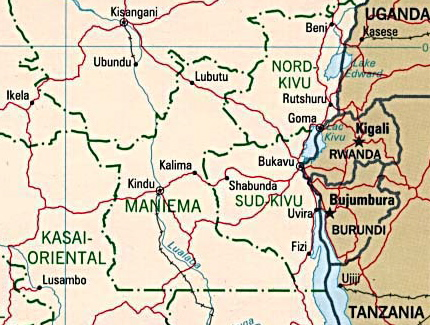
- Chemin de fer du Kivu It was planned to connect Uvira at Lake Tanganyika with Bukavu at Lake Kivu

Technical
- Line length: 94 km (58 mi)
- Track gauge: 3 ft 6 in (1,067 mm)

The Kivu Railway (French: Chemins de fer du Kivu) was a 94 km (58 mi) long narrow gauge railway with a gauge of 3 ft 6 in (1,067 mm) from Kalundu to Kamaniola in the Congo, which operated from 1931 to 1958.

== History ==
The privately owned Comité national du Kivu (C.N.Ki) decided in 1928 to build a connection between Uviara at the northern end of Lake Tanganyika to Bukavu (Costermansville) at the southern end of Lake Kivu.

The Compagnie des Chemins de fer du Kivu (C.E.F.A.K.I.) was established on 20 June 1929. It obtained the concession according to a decree of the Belgian Chamber of Representatives on 1 March 1930, which became ratified on 23 April 1930. C.E.F.A.K.I. was integrated into the Office des Transports Coloniaux (OTRACO) on 24 July 1946. The track was built by the Compagnie Belge des Chemin de fer et d'Entreprise (C.F.E.) and its first section from Kalundu to Kamanyola was inaugurated on 21 November 1931.

There were plans to integrate the track into the Cape to Cairo Railway. However, the plans to extend the railway from Kamaniola to Costermansville did not get realized due to the comparatively high cost.

Passenger traffic ceased on 1 July 1958 and goods traffic on 1 December 1958.

== Rolling stock ==
The rolling stock consisted of :

- 2 steam locomotives Mikado (2-8-2) with 32 t each
- 2 diesel locomotives with 27 t and 190 PS each, which were commissioned in 1949
- 2 Davenport diesel locomotives, which were commissioned in 1950
- 2 shunting steam engines with 22 t each
- 88 waggons

== Traffic ==
The traffic in the early 1950s was as follows:

Year	Passengers	Goods Mainly petroleum
1953	6.493 Passengers	53.994 t
1954	6.782 Passengers	75.414 t
1955	7.641 Passengers	82.790 t
