= Mukuku =

- Village
- Location within Democratic Republic of the Congo
- Coordinates: 5.9325°S 19.0004°E
- Country: Democratic Republic of the Congo
- Province: Kwilu Province
- Territory: Gungu

Mukuku is a village in Kwilu Province of the Democratic Republic of the Congo.

== Location ==
Mukuku is in Gungu Territory, about 40 kilometres (25 mi) southwest of the town of Gungu in Kwilu Province. The Köppen climate classification is Aw : Tropical savanna, wet.

== Historical note ==
In 1931 there were widespread disturbances in the Kwango District of Congo-Kasaï, which the Ministry of Colonies later attributed to new administrative structures, availability of Force Publique units and overreaction by administrators. At Mukuku in August 1931 troops killed 56 people in a single encounter. Word of the violence spread, and villagers fled before the columns reached them, leading to optimism among the authorities that the rebellion was calming down.

== Sources ==
- "Mukuku, Kwilu, Democratic Republic of the Congo", mindat.org
- "Node: Mukuku (5201924350)", OpenStreetMap
- Thomas, Martin (20 September 2012), Violence and Colonial Order: Police, Workers and Protest in the European Colonial Empires, 1918-1940, Cambridge University Press, ISBN 978-0-521-76841-2
