= Evangelical Community of Kwango =

The Evangelical Community of Kwango is a member of the Church of Christ in Congo. It was formed in 1924 by the Unevangelised Tribe Mission. Several mission stations were founded, the headquarters become the city of Kasongo-Luanda. Baptist Mission begun working in Kwango in the 1940s. Tension arose and the Unevangelised Tribe Mission left the country. Since 1952 Swiss and German missionaries came. In 1958 the church was officially organised. In 1970 the church gained independence.
