= Andoma, Democratic Republic of the Congo =

Andoma
- Village
- Location within Democratic Republic of the Congo
- Coordinates: 3.0591957°N 25.5194537°E
- Country: Democratic Republic of the Congo
- Province: Bas-Uélé
- Territory: Buta Territory

Andoma, formerly called Liénart, is a village in the Bas-Uélé province of the Democratic Republic of the Congo. It was a junction on the defunct Vicicongo line, a railway.

== Location ==
Andoma is in the Bas-Uélé province, Democratic Republic of the Congo. It is to the east of Buta and to the south of Titulé. It is in the Titulé Health Zone.

== Former railway ==
Andoma was formerly called Liénart after Commander Liénart, who was responsible for the Buta-Andoma section of the Vicicongo railway, and the Andoma-Titulé branch. The 159 kilometres (99 mi) section from Buta to Titulé via Andoma (Liénart) opened on 11 November 1932, built by the Société des Chemins de Fer Vicinaux du Congo. Colonel Paulis supervised work on the section from Andoma to Mungbere via Isiro (formerly called Paulis). The 55 kilometres (34 mi) section of this line from Andoma to Zobia was opened in December 1932.

== Sources ==
- "Node: Andoma (1309027664)", OpenStreetMap
- Omasombo Tshonda, Jean (2014), Bas-Uele Pouvoirs locaux et économie agricole : héritages d’un passé brouillé (PDF) (in French), Musée royal de l’Afrique centrale, ISBN 978-9-4916-1586-3
