= Alphonse Engels =

Deputy Governor-General of Équateur
- In office 1919 – 25 October 1921
- Preceded by: Georges Moulaert
- Succeeded by: Charles Duchesne

Deputy Governor-General of Congo-Kasaï
- In office 1922 – 19 June 1929
- Preceded by: Léon Guilain Bureau (1869–1944)
- Succeeded by: Joseph Beernaert

Personal details
- Born: 1880
- Died: 1962 (aged 81–82)
- Occupation: Soldier, administrator

Alphonse Engels (1880–1962), or A.L.R. Engels, was deputy governor-general of Congo-Kasaï province in the Belgian Congo from 1924 to 1929.

== Life ==
Alphonse Engels was born in 1880. He became a soldier by trade. He replaced Georges Moulaert as deputy governor-general of Équateur in 1919. On 25 October 1921 he was succeeded as governor by Charles Duchesne.

Engels was deputy governor-general of Congo-Kasaï province in the Belgian Congo from 1924 to 1929. He replaced Léon Guilain Bureau (1869–1944) as deputy governor-general of Congo-Kasaï in 1922. In 1925 he was made governor and deputy governor-general of the province. He left office on 19 June 1929, replaced by Joseph Beernaert.

In September 1930 Engels was a member of a formal commission of inquiry into the conditions of laborers in the colony. Other members included Colonel Alexis Bertrand (Note: Colonel Bertrand was later deputy governor-general of Orientale Province.) and Pierre Ryckmans, who had investigated the Kilo-Moto gold mines and the Huileries du Congo Belge (HCB).

Later he became a member of the Commission for the Royal Belgian Colonial Institute's Belgian Colonial Biography. He may have not been entirely impartial. When describing the very controversial summary execution by the Belgian officer Hubert Lothaire of the British merchant Charles Stokes in 1895, Engels describes Lothaire as a valliant officer, while Stokes had played an infamous role.

Engels died in 1962.

== Publications ==
- Engels, Alphonse (1912), Les Wangata, tribu du Congo belge: étude ethnographique, Vromant

== Sources ==
- "Congo (Kinshasa) Provinces", Rulers.org
- Van Pottelbergh, Gudrun (2006), "Octave Louwers, 'Éminence grise' van het Belgisch koloniaal establishment" (PDF), Journal of Belgian History, XXXVI (3–4)
- Vanthemsche, Guy (2011), "Van de Belgische Koloniale Biografie naar het Biografisch Woordenboek van Belgen Overzee" (PDF), Bull. Séanc. Acad. R. Sci. Outre-Mer, 57 (–4): 215–235
