= Georges Van der Kerken =

Belgian lawyer, colonial administrator and professor

Governor of Équateur Province (acting)
- In office January 1922 – September 1922
- Preceded by: Charles Duchesne
- Succeeded by: Charles Duchesne

Personal details
- Born: 16 October 1888 Ixelles, Belgium
- Died: 3 December 1953 (aged 65) Woluwe-Saint-Lambert, Belgium
- Occupation: Lawyer, colonial administrator

Georges Van der Kerken (16 October 1888 – 3 December 1953) was a Belgian lawyer, colonial administrator and professor. He served as acting governor of Équateur Province in the Belgian Congo in 1922. He is known for his publications on the ethnology of peoples of the Belgian Congo.

== Early years (1888–1914) ==
Georges-Jules-Pierre Van der Kerken was born in Ixelles on 16 October 1888. His parents were Théophile Van der Kerken and Charlotte Béraud. He obtained a doctorate in Law from the University of Brussels. He married Jeanne Rogissart.

== Colonial official (1914–1924) ==
From 1914 to 1919 Van der Kerken practiced law in Katanga Province as chief prosecutor, military auditor and judge. From 1919 to 1924 he served in the administration of the province of Équateur. He exercised in turn the functions of regional official, military auditor and district commissioner. Van der Kerken acted as governor of Équateur when the governor Charles Duchesne was on leave from January to September 1922.

== Academic (1924–1953) ==
Van der Kerken was a strong defender of indirect administration, a policy aimed at improving Africans while retaining their culture, traditions and language in a country that would one day have to administer itself. After leaving the administration Van der Kerken became a professor at the University Institute of Overseas Territories in Antwerp, where he taught "Congolese ethnography" from 1924 to 1934. In 1925 he was taught "Colonial economics and law" at the commercial school attached to the Faculty of Law in Ghent. In 1926–1927 he undertook a mission for the trade unions in the Congo. In 1927 he taught "Concepts on the governance of the Belgian Congo" and "The colonial nature and the legislation of Congo" at the Faculty of Law's commercial school, in 1935 gave a free course in "Legislation of the Belgian Congo as well as an overview of the foreign colonial institutions" at the commercial school. From 1934 he taught "Institutions and customary law in Belgian Africa" at the Law Faculty of the State University in Ghent.

Van der Kerken was member of the Standing Committee of the Belgian Colonial Congress, member of the Executive Council of the International Institute of African Languages and Cultures in London, member of the International Colonial Institute which became the International Institute of Differing Civilizations after World War II (1939–1945), member of the Society of Africanists (Société des Africanistes) of Paris and member of the International Institute of Anthropology (Institut international d'Anthropologie) of Paris. He was an associate member of the Royal Belgian Colonial Institute from 5 February 1930, full member from 9 November 1936, and director of the Section of Moral and Political Sciences in 1942. He ceased to participate in the activities of the Institute after the liberation of Belgium.

Georges Van der Kerken died in Woluwe-Saint-Lambert on 3 December 1953. He was Grand Officer of the Order of Leopold II and bearer of decorations of the Royal Order of the Lion.

== Publications ==
In the course of his duties, Van der Kerken was in constant contact with the local people in his area of jurisdiction. He took every opportunity to question the chiefs and notables in their own language about their religious, family, social and political institutions. He investigated the veracity of the information provided by the different groups of the same people, who sometimes lived miles apart. He also interviewed missionaries, civil servants and magistrates, who provided him with important and original information gathered during their long stay in the native environment. Félix Cattier proclaimed that Van der Kerken's first book, Les sociétés Bantoues du Congo belge et les problèrnes de la politique, was the standard work on the subject due to its broad and penetrating insight.

- Georges van der Kerken (1919), Les sociétés bantoues du Congo Belge et les problèmes de la politique indigène. : Étude de la politique coloniale adoptée au Congo Belge et de ses problèmes dans l'ordre sociologique, politique et économique
- Georges van der Kerken (1920), Le droit foncier indigène et le régime légal des terres et des mines au Congo belge
- Georges van der Kerken (1931), La crise économique en Afrique belge : situation actuelle et perspectives dávenir
- Edmond Verhulpen; Georges van der Kerken (1936), Baluba et Balubaïsés du Katanga
- Georges van der Kerken (1941), L'ethnie mongo: histoire, groupements, sousgroupements, origines; visions, représentations et explications du monde; sociologie, économie, ergologie, langues et arts des peuples mongo, politique indigène, contacts avec peuples voisins
- Georges van der Kerken (1942), Le mésolithique et le néolithique dans le bassin de l'Uele : le pavement d'Api, les graffiti, les cupules, les pédiformes, les mégalithes, les outils et les autres objets en pierre, le problème des populations mésolithiques et néolithiques du bassin de l'Uele
- Georges van der Kerken (1943), La politique coloniale belge
- Georges van der Kerken (1952), De Afrikaanse bevolking van Belgisch-Kongo en van Ruanda-Urundi; haar verleden en haar toekomst

== Sources ==
- Adriaens, H. (1960), GEORGES VAN DER KERKEN (1888-1953) (PDF), Universiteitsbibliotheek Gent
- De Cleene, N. (5 April 1966), "KERKEN (VAN DER) (Georges Jules Pierre Charles)", Biographie Belge d'Outre-Mer, vol. VI, Académie Royale des Sciences d'Outre-Mer, pp. col. 568–570
- Lufungula, Lewono (1986), "Les gouverneurs de l'Équateur, 1885 - 1960", Annales Aequatoria, 7, Honoré Vinck: 149–166, JSTOR 25836402
