= Dengese people =

Ethnic group in the Democratic Republic of the Congp

Ndengese
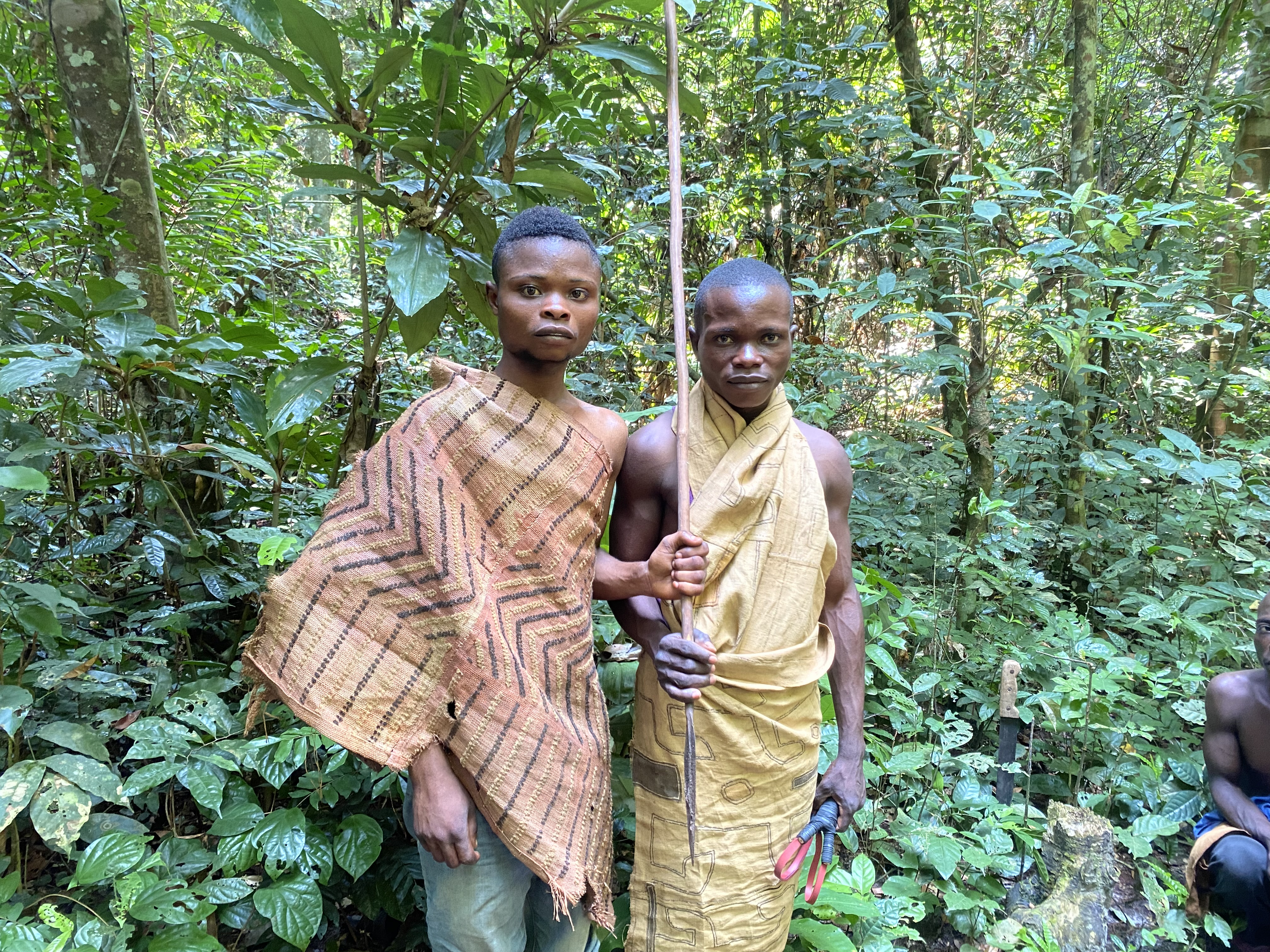
- Dengese boys in Bakomo village, Kasaï-Oriental

Total population
- approx. 12,000

Languages
- Dengese, Lingala

Religion
- Christianity; traditional African religion

Related ethnic groups
- Mongo, Tetela, Kusu

The Dengese, also known as the Ndengese, are an ethnic group from the Democratic Republic of the Congo. The Dengese primarily inhabiat Kasaï-Oriental Province and speak Bondengese and Lingala.

They go by various names, including: Bonkese, Bonkesse, Dekese, Dengese, Dengeses, Ileo, Ndengeses, Ndengse, Ndenkese, and Nkutu.

The Dengese population is approximately 12,000.

== Culture and religion ==
The Dengese are predominately Christian, with a minority continuing to practice traditional African religions.

== Gallery ==
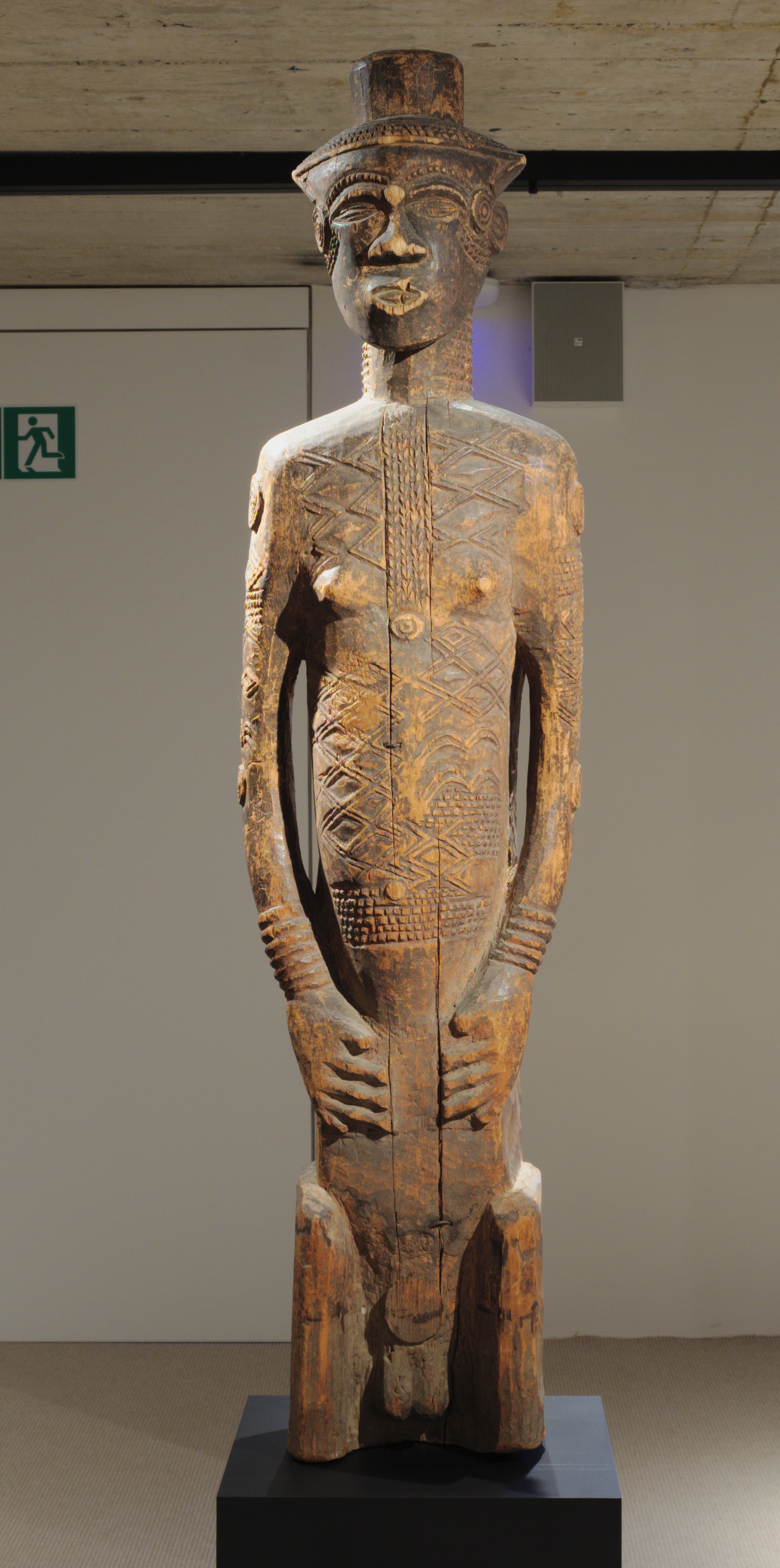
Dengese statue in the Musée L

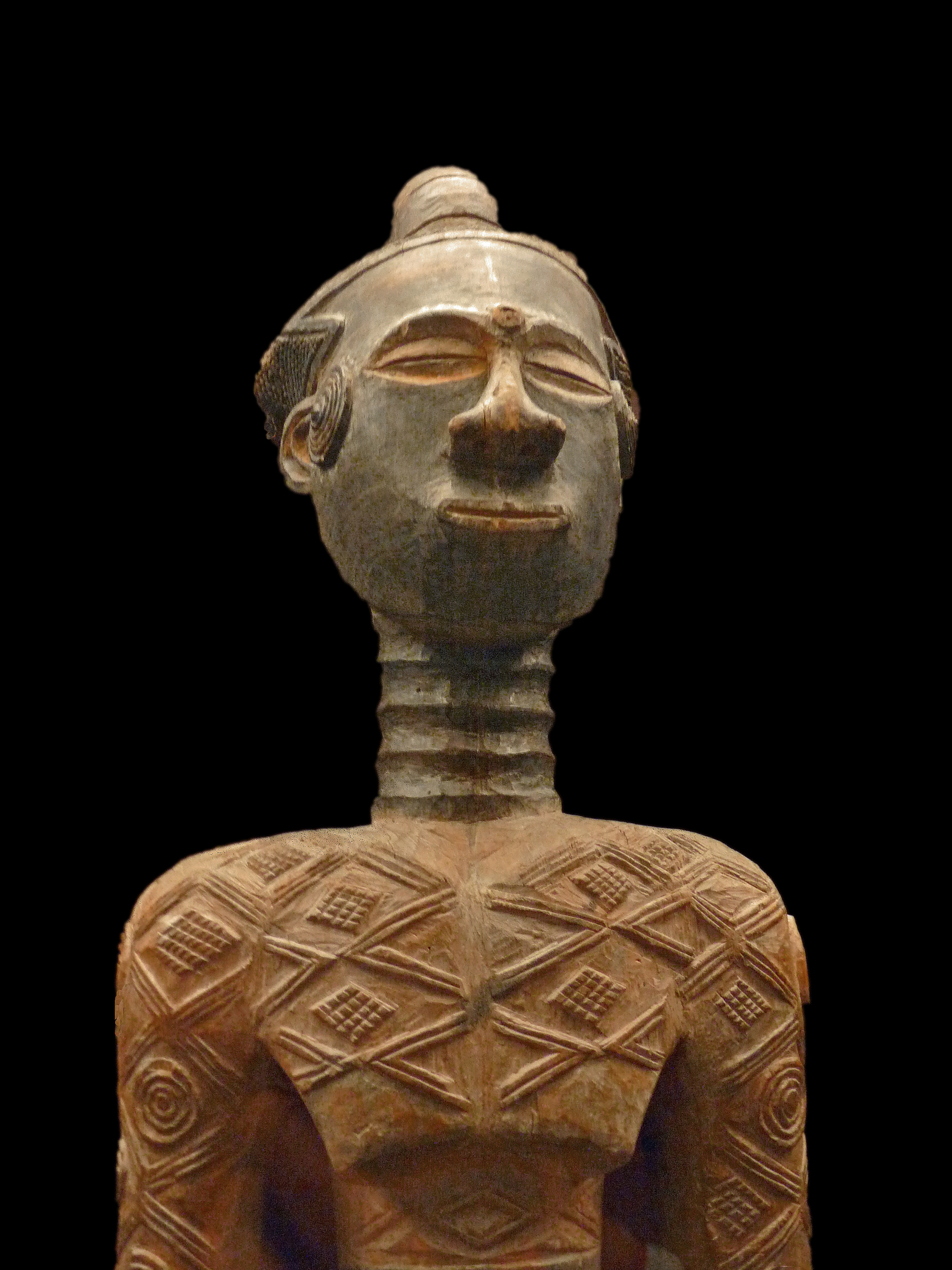
Détail de statue à scarifications

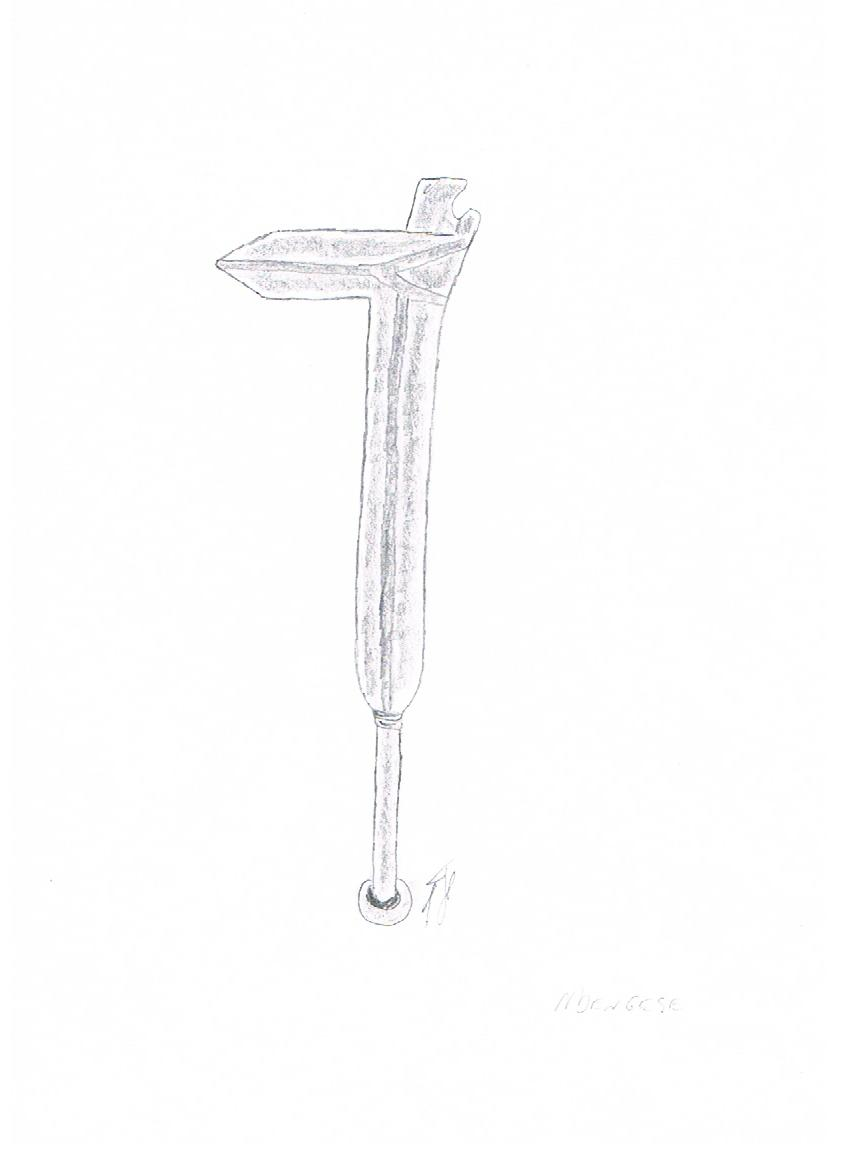
Couteau de jet
