= Cuvette Centrale Province =

- Province
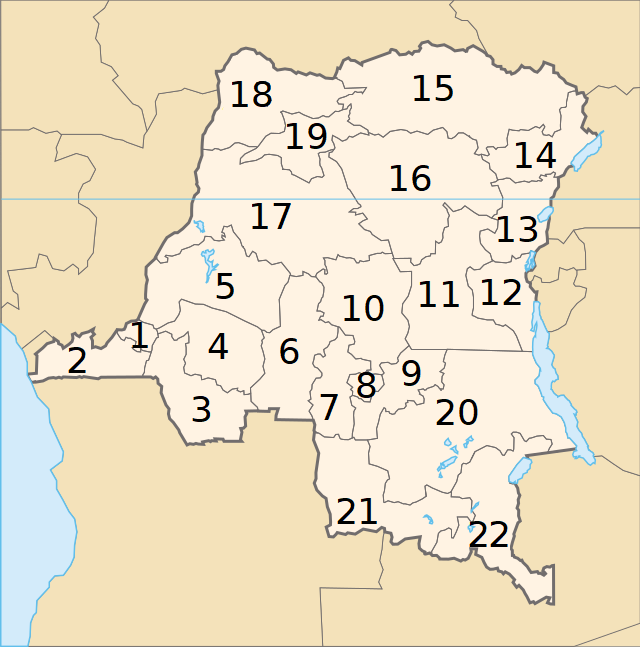
- Provinces of the DRC in 1964. 17 – Cuvette-Centrale. 18 – Ubangi. 19 – Moyen-Congo
- Coordinates: 0.048°N 18.256°E
- Country: Democratic Republic of the Congo
- Established: 14 August 1962
- Capital: Coquilhatville

Government
  - President: Léon Engulu

Area
  - Total: 236,842 km^{2} (91,445 sq mi)

Cuvette Centrale Province was a province of the Democratic Republic of the Congo that existed between 1963 and 1966 during the Congo Crisis.

== Location ==
Cuvette Centrale Province covered the area of the present provinces of Équateur and Tshuapa in the northwest of the Democratic Republic of the Congo. It is named after the Cuvette Centrale (Central Basin), a geological basin covering an area of around 800,000 square kilometres (310,000 sq mi) to the north of Kinshasa. This is a region of swamps and dense tropical forest, with few roads and no railways. Under the law of 14 August 1962 Cuvette Centrale Province comprised the territories of Basankusu, Bolomba, Coq-Kalamba, Ingende and Bikoro in Équateur District; Boende, Befale, Bokungo, Djolu, Ikela and Monkoto in Tshuapa District, and the Bongandanga sector in Bongandanga Territory.

== History ==
Cuvette Centrale Province was established on 14 August 1962, when the country was divided into 21 provinces. Équateur Province was divided into the Cuvette-Centrale and Ubangi provinces. The capital of Cuvette Centrale Province was Coquilhatville (Mbandaka). Léon Engulu was president of the province and Raphael Bokanga was president of the assembly. The new province hosted sessions of the Coquilhatville constitutional conference from 31 January to 10 February 1963. On 5 February 1963 the northern part of Cuvette-Centrale was split off as Moyen-Congo Province.

Under an emergency ordinance Joseph Ekombe was designated Extraordinary Commissioner General for the province of Cuvette Centrale on 22 April 1963 but did not take up this position. Victor Rutaha was designated on 27 April 1963 and took over in Coquilhatville on 8 May 1963. An ordinance of 8 July 1963 cancelled the position. This was quickly followed by a drastic reduction in funding from the central government in Léopoldville. The regions of Boende, Bokungu and Ikela were full of rebels, and the central government provided some assistance in pacification. There were plans to hold National and provincial elections between 18 March and 30 April 1965, but these were cancelled.

On 6 January 1966 all the provincial governors met in Kinshasa in an attempt to resolve the conflicts that were tearing apart the country. On 6 April 1966 the number of provinces was reduced from 21 to 12, and towards the end of the year from 12 to 8. On 25 April 1966 the provinces of Cuvette Centrale, Moyen-Congo and Ubangi were reunited as Équateur Province under the leadership of Léon Engulu, who held office until 3 January 1967.

== Sources ==
- Lufungula, Lewono (1989), "Les Gouverneurs de l'Equateur (Zaire) de 1960 à 1988", Annales Aequatoria, 10, Honoré Vinck: 65–90, JSTOR 25836509
- Misser, François (April 2013), "Enjeux et défis d'une province pétrolière en devenir" (PDF), Cahiers Africains (in French), ISBN 978-2-343-00465-5, ISSN 1021-9994
