= Laurent Eketebi =

Congolese politician

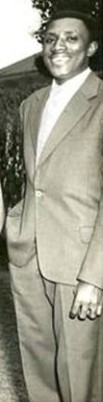
- Laurent Eketebi in 1960

State Commissioner of Transport and Communications of Zaire
- In office July 1972 – 7 January 1975
National offices
Vice Minister of Foreign Affairs of the Democratic Republic of the Congo
In office
2 July 1971 – July 1972
Democratic Republic of the Congo Ambassador to the Conseil de l'Entente
In office
January 1971 – July 1971
Democratic Republic of the Congo Ambassador to Tanzania
In office
1969–1970
Director of the Office of the Head of State of the Democratic Republic of the Congo
In office
December 1965 – 1969
Provincial offices
President of Équateur Province
In office
30 June 1960 – September 1962
President of Moyen-Congo Province
In office
September 1962 – July 1964
Minister of Public Functions of Moyen-Congo Province
In office
April 1963 – July 1964

Personal details
- Born: 13 May 1936 Coquilhatville, Belgian Congo
- Died: February 2006 (aged 69)
- Party: Mouvement National Congolais; Parti de l'Unité Nationale; Parti démocratique congolais
- Spouse: Béatrice Lifela Y'Aekesako
- Children: 9

Laurent-Gabriel Eketebi, later Eketebi Moyidiba Mondjolomba (13 May 1936 – February 2006), was a Congolese politician who served as President of Équateur Province from June 1960 until September 1962 and as President of Moyen-Congo Province from then until June 1964. He later served as State Commissioner of Transport and Communications from July 1972 until January 1975, when he was dismissed and charged with various financial crimes. Eketebi was convicted, but received a pardon in 1994. He died in 2006.

== Early life ==
Laurent Eketebi was born on 13 May 1936 in Coquilhatville, Belgian Congo to a Ngombe father and a Mongo mother. He attended the administrative and commercial section of the Groupe Scolaire Officiel Congréganiste, run by the Frères des Ecoles Chrétiennes in Coquilhatville, where he received six years of primary education and six years of secondary education, graduating in 1954. He later married Béatrice Lifela Y'Aekesako and had nine children with her.

Eketebi worked in the colonial administration, initially serving as a clerk for the Équateur provincial finance service in the third class of the sixth grade of the civil service. In 1957 he was promoted to a position in the fourth grade, a level normally reserved for Belgians. He held the post until 1960. From 1952 to 1955 he was a member of the council of the Centre Extra-Coutumier de Coquilhatville, an organisation with the responsibility of overseeing the activities of native Congolese in Coquilhatville. Eketebi was a member of the Association du Personnel Indigene de la Colonie, a labour union, and in 1958 he served as its provincial secretary. He also served as secretary-general of the Coquilhatville section of the Fedération du Nord de l'Equateur. Eketebi obtained a prominent position in the Équateur branch of the Mouvement National Congolais, a political party, but later left it to join Jean Bolikango's Parti de l'Unité Nationale (PUNA).

=== Provincial government ===
In March 1960 Eketebi was appointed to the Équateur Executive College, a transitional body meant to administer the region until the Congo's independence on 30 June. Together with its two other members, he monitored the disorders that occurred during the subsequent general elections. He used his multi-ethnic background to broker a compromise that resulted in a coalition between PUNA, the Parti National du Progrès, and the Union des Mongo. The Équateur Provincial Assembly subsequently elected him president of the province. After the elections PUNA gradually divided into two different wings, one led by Eketebi and the other by Bolikango.

Eketebi served as President of Équateur Province (highlighted) from 30 June 1960 until September 1962.

Eketebi took office on 30 June. Despite the secessions of Katanga and South Kasai in July and August, respectively, he actively discouraged separatist activities in Équateur. His government undertook development projects during its tenure. He approved of Colonel Joseph-Desiré Mobutu's coup in September which overthrew the central government and the subsequent installation of the College of Commissioners-General. Eketebi participated in the Coquilhatville Conference in May 1961. That year increasing tensions between Ngombe and Mongo factions in the provincial assembly brought about an administrative breakdown. Eketebi worked intensively to improve relations between the two groups. An attempt by several deputies in October to censure his government and force his dismissal failed. His tenure ended in September 1962. Équateur was subsequently broken up into smaller provinces.

On 14 September 1962 Eketebi filed his candidacy for president of the new province of Moyen-Congo. The new provincial assembly subsequently elected him to the post. He was unanimously reelected by the assembly in April 1963 and was invested with the public functions portfolio. In December, Eketebi, in a dispute with Bolikango, defected from PUNA and joined the Parti démocratique congolais. The following month Bolikango called a PUNA congress to Lisala to reorganise his party, despite such political conventions being prohibited by the central government. On 26 January conflict broke out when gendarmes attempted to disperse the attendees. By the end of the next day 19 people were shot and killed. Bolikango and Eketebi both denied responsibility, but the local population held the latter at fault. He became increasingly politically isolated and faced disagreement in his own cabinet; his vice-president requested that the central government depose him. An investigation by a public prosecutor did not hold anyone responsible for the 26/27 January incident, but nevertheless concluded that Moyen-Congo was in crisis. The central government subsequently proclaimed an état d’exception in the province and placed it under the control of a special commissioner. Opposition deputies from Lisala and Bumba were thus able to meet to discuss the dismantling of Eketebi's government.

In early June the Lisala-Bumba deputies replaced the pro-Eketebi President of the Assembly and forced all of the ministers of the government to resign. Eketebi narrowly escaped a censure vote only due to his popular support in the Bomongo and Lisala territories. Then on 21 June the provincial deputies brought up a motion of censure. Accusing him of partisan and discriminatory politics, disorganisation, lacking in an effective government programme, misappropriating public funds for personal purposes, encouraging corruption, stoking conflict between the Bumba and Lisala regions, and holding responsibility in the January incident, they voted to dismiss him. Still in possession of the support of some riverine peoples, he challenged the legitimacy of the government that replaced his. However, in the 1965 elections Bolikango was reelected to his seat in the national Parliament by a wide margin, thus eclipsing Eketebi's popularity in the region.

=== National government ===
Eketebi served as deputy director of the Office of the Head of State from December 1965 until 1969. From 1969 until 1970, he served as Ambassador Extraordinary and Plenipotentiary to Tanzania. From January to July 1971, he served as Ambassador to the Conseil de l'Entente with residence in Abidjan.

On 2 July 1971 Eketebi was appointed Vice Minister of Foreign Affairs by President Mobutu. In July 1972 he was made State Commissioner of Transport and Communications. On 7 January 1975 he was dismissed from his post. Later that month Eketebi was stripped of the National Order of the Leopard and a criminal investigation was opened against him. The government accused him of misappropriating 14 million zaires, 58 million Belgian francs, and 727,000 United States dollars, and filed 48 charges of corruption and financial crimes against him. The Supreme Court of Justice dismissed his attempts in limini litis to halt the proceedings by claiming immunity under Amnesty Law no. 74/023 of 27 November 1974. He was convicted on several counts of misappropriation of public funds and his property was seized by the government.

== Later life ==
Eketebi was pardoned on 18 October 1994. He died in February 2006.

== Bibliography ==
- Artigue, Pierre (1961). Qui sont les leaders congolais?. Carrefours Africains (in French). Vol. 3. Brussels: Éditions Europe-Afrique. OCLC 469948352.
- Bonyeka, Bomandeke (1992). Le Parlement congolais sous le régime de la Loi fondamentale (in French). Kinshasa: Presses universitaire du Zaire. OCLC 716913628.
- Legum, Colin, ed. (1973). Africa contemporary record : annual survey and documents. Vol. 5. New York: Africana Publishing Company. ISBN 9780841901544.
- Lemarchand, René (1964). Political Awakening in the Belgian Congo. Berkeley: University of California Press. OCLC 905074256.
- Lufungula Lewono (1989). "Les Gouverneurs de L'Équateur (Zaire) de 1960 à 1988". Annales Æquatoria (in French). 10: 65–90. ISSN 0254-4296. JSTOR 25836509.
- Lufungula Lewono (1995). "Participation des Congolais a la gestion du Centre Extra-Coutumier de Coquilhatville: 1952-1958". Annales Æquatoria (in French). 16: 307–338. ISSN 0254-4296. JSTOR 25837216.
- Omasombo Tshonda, Jean, ed. (2015). Mongala : Jonction des territoires et bastion d'une identité supra-ethnique (PDF). Provinces (in French). Tervuren: Musée royal de l’Afrique centrale. ISBN 978-9-4922-4416-1.
- "Les Retroactes des Arrets Eketebi Mondjolomba et Matonda Nsakala". Review of the African Commission on Human and People's Rights (in French). 7. 1998. ISSN 1353-6834.
- Vanderstraeten, Louis-François (1993). De la Force publique à l'Armée nationale congolaise: histoire d'une mutinerie, juillet 1960 (in French) (reprint ed.). Brussels: Académie royale de Belgique. ISBN 9782803101047.
- Willame, Jean-Claude (1972). Patrimonialism and Political Change in the Congo. Stanford: Stanford University Press. ISBN 978-0-8047-0793-0.
- Young, Crawford (1965). Politics in the Congo: Decolonization and Independence. Princeton: Princeton University Press. OCLC 307971.
