= Martin Rutten =

Belgian colonial civil servant and lawyer

Governor-General of the Belgian Congo
- In office 24 January 1923 – 27 December 1927
- Monarch: Albert I
- Preceded by: Maurice Lippens
- Succeeded by: Auguste Tilkens

Personal details
- Born: Martin Jean Marie René Rutten; 12 June 1876 Clermont-sur-Berwinne, Belgium
- Died: 31 December 1944 (aged 68) Brussels, Belgium

Martin Rutten (1876–1944) was a Belgian colonial civil servant and lawyer who served as Governor-General of the Belgian Congo from 1923 to 1927.

== Biography ==
Martin Rutten was born in the village of Clermont-sur-Berwinne in Belgium's Province of Liège in 1876. His father was originally from Belgian Limburg and his mother was Walloon. Rutten studied Law, gaining a doctorate, and later practiced as a lawyer in Verviers.

In 1901, Rutten enlisted in the colonial civil service as a magistrate. He was posted to Katanga Province and later sent to Bas-Congo to head the Prosecutor's Office (parquet général) at the Appeals Court in Léopoldville (now Kinshasa). He was posted back to Katanga after the creation of a second appellate court at Élisabethville (now Lubumbashi) as prosecuting magistrate (procureur général).

In October 1918, Rutten was promoted to the rank of Vice-Governor General. For two years, he was given responsibility for the administration of Katanga. Rutten was appointed to Governor-General in 1923 following the resignation of Maurice Lippens after differences between him and the Ministry of the Colonies. Rutten's appointment marked a change in colonial policy as previously most governors had been selected from military backgrounds. Louis Franck, however, selected Rutten because of his civilian background and because of his long personal experience in the Congo. His term coincided with trade union unrest among colonial civil servants. He returned to Belgium at the end of his term in 1927.

In retirement, Rutten was involved in colonial associations in Belgium including the Royal Belgian Colonial Institute. He retired definitively in 1934 and died in Brussels on 31 December 1944.
