= Auguste Tilkens =

Belgian career soldier and colonial civil servant

Governor-General of the Belgian Congo
- In office 27 December 1927 – 14 September 1934
- Monarchs: Albert I (1927–34); Leopold III (1934)
- Preceded by: Martin Rutten
- Succeeded by: Pierre Ryckmans

Personal details
- Born: Auguste Constant Tilkens; 1 October 1869 Ostend, Belgium
- Died: 1 December 1949 (aged 80) Brussels, Belgium

Lieutenant General Auguste Tilkens (1869–1949) was a Belgian career soldier and colonial civil servant who served as Governor-General of the Belgian Congo from 1927 until 1934.

== Biography ==
Auguste Tilkens was born in 1869 into a large family in the Flemish coastal city of Ostend. He entered the Royal Military Academy in 1887 and became an artillery officer in the Belgian Army. Following the outbreak of World War I in August 1914, during German invasion of Belgium, Tilkens served in the Belgian forces and was decorated for valour at the Battle of the Yser. In 1916, with emergence of static trench warfare on the Western Front, he volunteered for service in Belgian Congo where fighting had broken out on the colony's border with German East Africa. He served under Charles Tombeur during the subsequent fighting in East Africa. In 1917, he returned to Europe where he became aide de camp to King Albert I. After the end of World War I in 1918, Tilkens remained in the army and rose through the ranks further, taking overall command of Belgium's artillery and, later, its Air Force. In 1927, he was promoted to the rank of lieutenant general.

In December 1927, Tilkens was named Governor-General of the Belgian Congo, the senior civil servant in the colony, and retired from the Belgian Army. He held the position during the state visits of both Albert I (1928) and the Duke of Brabant, later King Leopold III (1933).

Tilkens' tenure as Governor-General coincided with the start of the Great Depression which hit the Congo in the early 1930s and caused an economic crisis. With the Congo's budget cut by the Belgian government, Tilkens decided to reform the entire colonial administration to create a more cheaper, more centralized system. The reform was unveiled from June until December 1933. The number of provinces was increased from four to six and the number of subdivisions (territories) reduced sharply. This proved unpopular, especially among the Congo's European population.

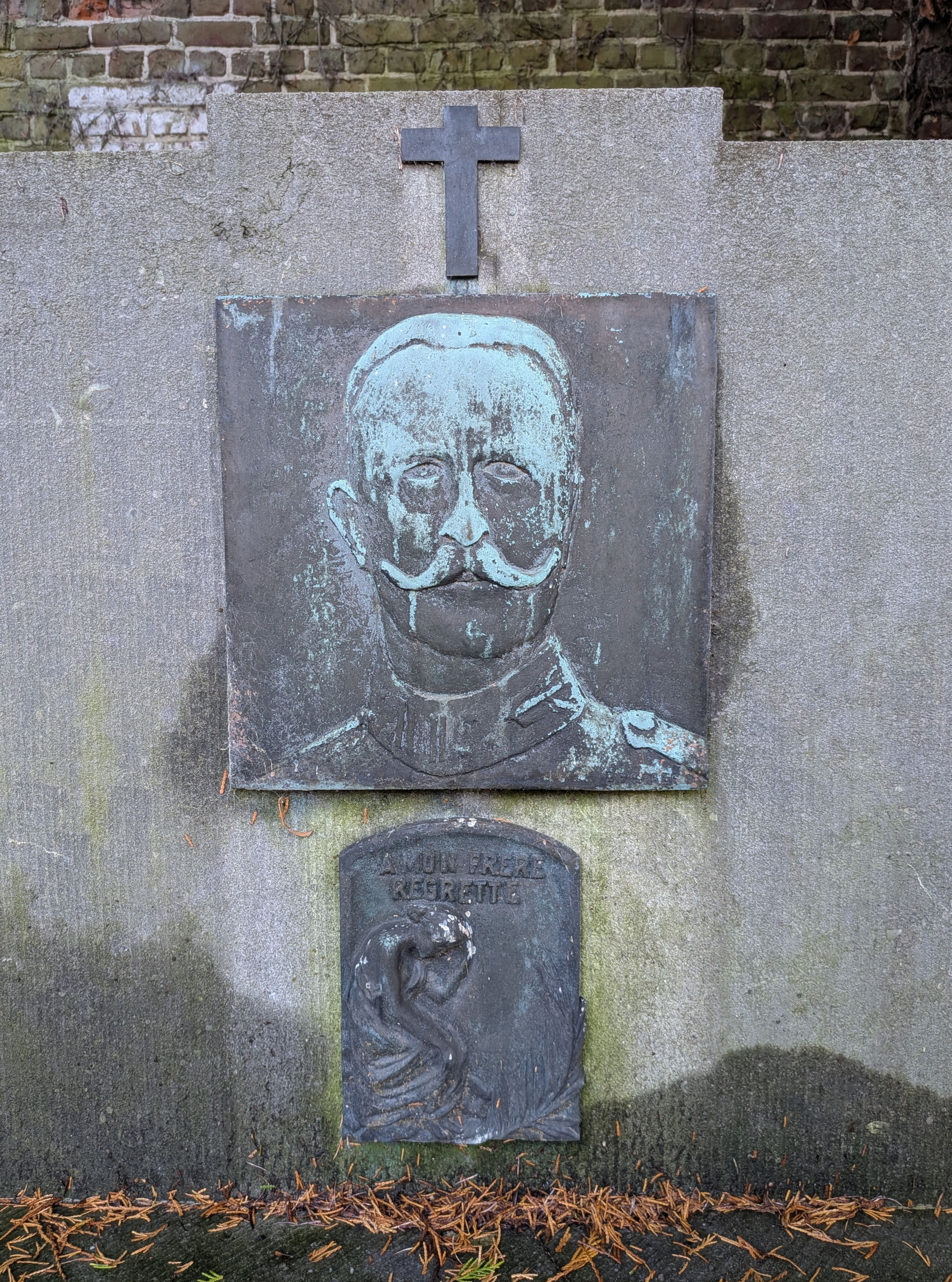
Grave of Tilkens

In 1934, Tilkens returned to Belgium at the expiration of his term. Leopold III promoted him to a position in the royal household in 1934 and, in 1935, made him director of the National Institute for Agronomy in Belgian Congo (Institut national pour l'étude agronomique du Congo belge, INEAC). From May 1936 until May 1946, he served as head of the Special Committee for Katanga (Comité Spécial du Katanga, CSK). He remained in Belgium during the German occupation in World War II. Tikens died on 1 December 1949.
