= List of years in the Democratic Republic of the Congo =

This is a list of years in the Democratic Republic of the Congo.

== Democratic Republic of the Congo ==
2020s
2020
2021
2022
2023
2024
2025
2026
2027
2028
2029

2010s
2010
2011
2012
2013
2014
2015
2016
2017
2018
2019

2000s
2000
2001
2002
2003
2004
2005
2006
2007
2008
2009

1990s
1997
1998
1999

== Zaire ==
1990s
1990
1991
1992
1993
1994
1995
1996
1997

1980s
1980
1981
1982
1983
1984
1985
1986
1987
1988
1989

1970s
1971
1972
1973
1974
1975
1976
1977
1978
1979

== Democratic Republic of the Congo ==
1970s
1970

1960s
1960
1961
1962
1963
1964
1965
1966
1967
1968
1969

== Belgian Congo ==
1950s
1950
1951
1952
1953
1954
1955
1956
1957
1958
1959

1940s
1940
1941
1942
1943
1944
1945
1946
1947
1948
1949

1930s
1930
1931
1932
1933
1934
1935
1936
1937
1938
1939

1920s
1920
1921
1922
1923
1924
1925
1926
1927
1928
1929

1910s
1910
1911
1912
1913
1914
1915
1916
1917
1918
1919

1900s
1908
1909

== Congo Free State ==
1900s
1900
1901
1902
1903
1904
1905
1906
1907

1890s
1890
1891
1892
1893
1894
1895
1896
1897
1898
1899

1880s
1885
1886
1887
1888
1889

== See also ==
- Timeline of healthcare in the Democratic Republic of the Congo
- Timeline of Kinshasa
- Timeline of Lubumbashi

== Bibliography ==
- Benjamin Vincent (1910), "Congo", Haydn's Dictionary of Dates (25th ed.), London: Ward, Lock & Co. – via Internet Archive
- "Democratic Republic of the Congo". Political Chronology of Africa. Political Chronologies of the World. Europa Publications. 2001. pp. 100–113. ISBN 0203409957.
- Didier Gondola (2002). "Timeline of Historical Events". History of Congo. Greenwood. ISBN 978-0-313-31696-8.
- Andreas Mehler; et al., eds. (2007). "Democratic Republic of the Congo". Africa Yearbook: Politics, Economy and Society South of the Sahara in 2006. Koninklijke Brill. p. 236+. ISBN 978-90-04-20556-7.
- Denis M. Tull (2008). "Democratic Republic of the Congo". In Andreas Mehler; et al. (eds.). Africa Yearbook: Politics, Economy and Society South of the Sahara in 2007. Vol. 4. Koninklijke Brill. pp. 239–254. ISBN 978-9004168053. ISSN 1871-2525.
- Denis M. Tull (2011). "Democratic Republic of the Congo". In Andreas Mehler; et al. (eds.). Africa Yearbook: Politics, Economy and Society South of the Sahara in 2010. Vol. 7. Koninklijke Brill. pp. 243–256. ISBN 9789004205567. ISSN 1871-2525.
- Claude Simons (2013), "Democratic Republic of the Congo", in Andreas Mehler; et al. (eds.), Africa Yearbook: Politics, Economy and Society South of the Sahara in 2012, vol. 9, Koninklijke Brill, pp. 241–254, ISBN 9789004256002, ISSN 1871-2525
- Emizet Francois Kisangani (2016). "Chronology". Historical Dictionary of the Democratic Republic of the Congo (4th ed.). Rowman & Littlefield. ISBN 9781442273160.
