= 1891 in the Congo Free State =

- Decades: 1880s; 1890s; 1900s

The following lists events that happened during 1891 in the Congo Free State.

== Incumbent ==
- King – Leopold II of Belgium
- Governor-general – Camille Coquilhat, then Théophile Wahis

== Events ==
Date	Event
	The Compagnie du Congo pour le Commerce et l'Industrie (CCCI) joins with a group of English investors to formally create the Compagnie du Katanga, which would defend Belgian interests in Katanga Province against British claims.
	American Presbyterian church in Congo founded, precursor of the Presbyterian Community in Congo.
9 April 1891	Royal Order of the Lion is established by King Leopold II of Belgium, awarded for services to the Congo.
15 April 1891	Théophile Wahis replaces Camille Coquilhat as vice governor-general

== See also ==
- Congo Free State
- History of the Democratic Republic of the Congo

== Sources ==
- "Compagnie du Congo pour le Commerce et l'Industrie. CCCI", Africa Museum (in French)
