= 1886 in the Congo Free State =

- Decades: 1880s; 1890s; 1900s

The following lists events that happened during 1886 in the Congo Free State.

== Incumbent ==
- King – Leopold II of Belgium
- Administrator-General – Francis de Winton, then Camille Janssen

== Events ==
Date	Event
April	Camille Janssen replaces Francis de Winton as Administrator-General
3 September	Administrator-general Camille Janssen defines nine districts in the colony, each headed by a district commissioner: Banana; Boma; Matadi; Lukungu; Léopoldville; Kin-Chassa (Kinshasa?); Bangala; Stanley-Falls; Lubuku-Kassaï
22 November	The Mission sui iuris of the Belgian Congo is established from territory taken from both the Apostolic Prefecture of Lower Congo (in Cubango, Angola) and the Apostolic Vicariate of Two Guineas (in Gabon)
27 December	Compagnie du Congo pour le Commerce et l'Industrie (CCCI) is created, the first Belgian colonial society to be involved in exploration and exploitation of the Congo.

== See also ==
- Congo Free State
- History of the Democratic Republic of the Congo

== Sources ==
- Defauwes, Georges, Albert Thys, de Dalhem au Congo (PDF) (in French), archived from the original (PDF) on 22 January 2016
- Etat Indépendant du Congo (1886), Bulletin Officiel (PDF)
