= 1897 in the Congo Free State =

- Decades: 1880s; 1890s; 1900s

The following lists events that happened during 1897 in the Congo Free State.

== Incumbent ==
- King – Leopold II of Belgium
- Governor-general – Théophile Wahis

== Events ==
| Date | Event |
|---|---|
| | The Community of Disciples of Christ was founded in the Equatorial region of the Disciples of Christ Congo Mission. |
| 11 April | Émile Wangermée is appointed vice governor-general |
| 1 December | Alphonse van Gèle is appointed vice governor-general |

== See also ==
- Congo Free State
- History of the Democratic Republic of the Congo

== Sources ==
- Johannes a Lasco Library (20 February 2004). "Address data base of Reformed churches and institutions". Reformiert-online.net.
