= 1889 in the Congo Free State =

- Decades: 1880s; 1890s; 1900s

The following lists events that happened during 1889 in the Congo Free State.

== Incumbent ==
- King – Leopold II of Belgium
- Governor-general – Camille Janssen

== Events ==
Date	Event
January	Henri Gondry is appointed acting vice governor-general
16 January	The Service Star civil decoration is created by Leopold II.
25 June	Willem Frans Van Kerckhoven becomes commissioner of the District of Équateur.

== See also ==
- Congo Free State
- History of the Democratic Republic of the Congo

== Sources ==
- Allart, J.-B. (1889), "Le Congo en 1890", Bulletin de la Société royale de géographie d'Anvers, 14: 334
- Lufungula, Lewono (1986), "Les gouverneurs de l'Équateur, 1885 - 1960", Annales Aequatoria, 7, Honoré Vinck: 149–166, JSTOR 25836402
