= 1907 in the Congo Free State =

- Decades: 1880s; 1890s; 1900s

The following lists events that happened during 1907 in the Congo Free State.

== Incumbent ==
- King – Leopold II of Belgium
- Governor-general – Théophile Wahis

== Events ==
| Date | Event |
|---|---|
| | Félix Fuchs is appointed vice governor-general |
| | Tanganyika Concessions digs the first pits and trenches in the Etoile Mine area. |
| | Alexis Bertrand becomes commissioner of the District of Équateur. |

== See also ==
- Congo Free State
- History of the Democratic Republic of the Congo

== Sources ==
- Lufungula, Lewono (1986), "Les gouverneurs de l'Équateur, 1885 - 1960", Annales Aequatoria, 7, Honoré Vinck: 149–166, JSTOR 25836402
- "SECTION 12 EXECUTIVE SUMMARY OF THE COMPETENT PERSONS' REPORT AND VALUATION STATEMENT OF RUASHI HOLDINGS (PTY) LTD AND RUASHI MINING SPRL IN THE DEMOCRATIC REPUBLIC OF THE CONGO" (PDF). Metorex. 1 January 2010. Archived from the original (PDF) on 12 August 2011.
