= 1888 in the Congo Free State =

- Decades: 1880s; 1890s; 1900s

The following lists events that happened during 1888 in the Congo Free State.

== Incumbent ==
- King – Leopold II of Belgium
- Governor-general – Camille Janssen

== Events ==
Date	Event
	Dekese, Kasaï Province, is founded by Alexandre Delcommune around 1888.
31 January	Herman Ledeganck is appointed vice-governor-general
March	Léopoldville shipyards, organized by Charles Liebrechts, launch the Roi des Belges on the upper Congo River for the Compagnie du Congo pour le Commerce et l'Industrie (CCCI).
11 May	The Mission sui iuris of the Belgian Congo is promoted as the Apostolic Vicariate of Belgian Congo
10 December	Société anonyme belge pour le commerce du Haut-Congo (SAB) is founded.
30 December	Order of the African Star is established by Leopold II of Belgium

== See also ==
- Congo Free State
- History of the Democratic Republic of the Congo

== Sources ==
- Bekina, Jacques Mpia (2010), L'évangélisation du Mai-Ndombe au Congo-Kinshasa: histoire, difficultés présentes et inculturation (in French), Editions L'Harmattan, ISBN 978-2-296-12452-3
- Moulaert, G. (12 February 1952), "LIEBRECHTS (Charles Adolphe Marie)", Biographie Coloniale Belge (in French), vol. III, Inst. roy. colon. belge, pp. col. 556-56
- Plas, J.; Pourbaix, Victor (1899), Les Sociétés Commerciales Belges de l'État Indépendant du Congo (PDF), Brussels
