= 1908 in the Congo Free State =

- Decades: 1880s; 1890s; 1900s
- See also: 1908 in the Belgian Congo

The following lists events that happened during 1908 in the Congo Free State.

== Incumbent ==
- King – Leopold II of Belgium
- Governor-general – Théophile Wahis

== Events ==
Date	Event
15 November	Parliament of Belgium annexes the Congo Free State as the Belgian Congo.

== See also ==
- 1908 in the Belgian Congo
- History of the Democratic Republic of the Congo

== Sources ==
- Senelle, R.; Clément, E. (2009), Léopold II et la Charte Coloniale (in French), Brussels: Editions Mols
