= 1916 in the Belgian Congo =

- Decades: 1900s; 1910s; 1920s; 1930s

The following lists events that happened during 1916 in the Belgian Congo.

== Incumbent ==
- Governor-general – Félix Fuchs then Eugène Henry

== Events ==
| Date | Event |
|---|---|
| 5 January 1916 | Eugène Henry replaces Félix Fuchs as governor-general |
| July | Alexis Bertrand is appointed Interim deputy governor-general of Orientale Province |

== See also ==
- Belgian Congo
- History of the Democratic Republic of the Congo
