= 1912 in the Belgian Congo =

- Decades: 1900s; 1910s; 1920s; 1930s

The following lists events that happened during 1912 in the Belgian Congo.

== Incumbent ==
- Governor-general – Théophile Wahis, then Félix Fuchs

== Events ==
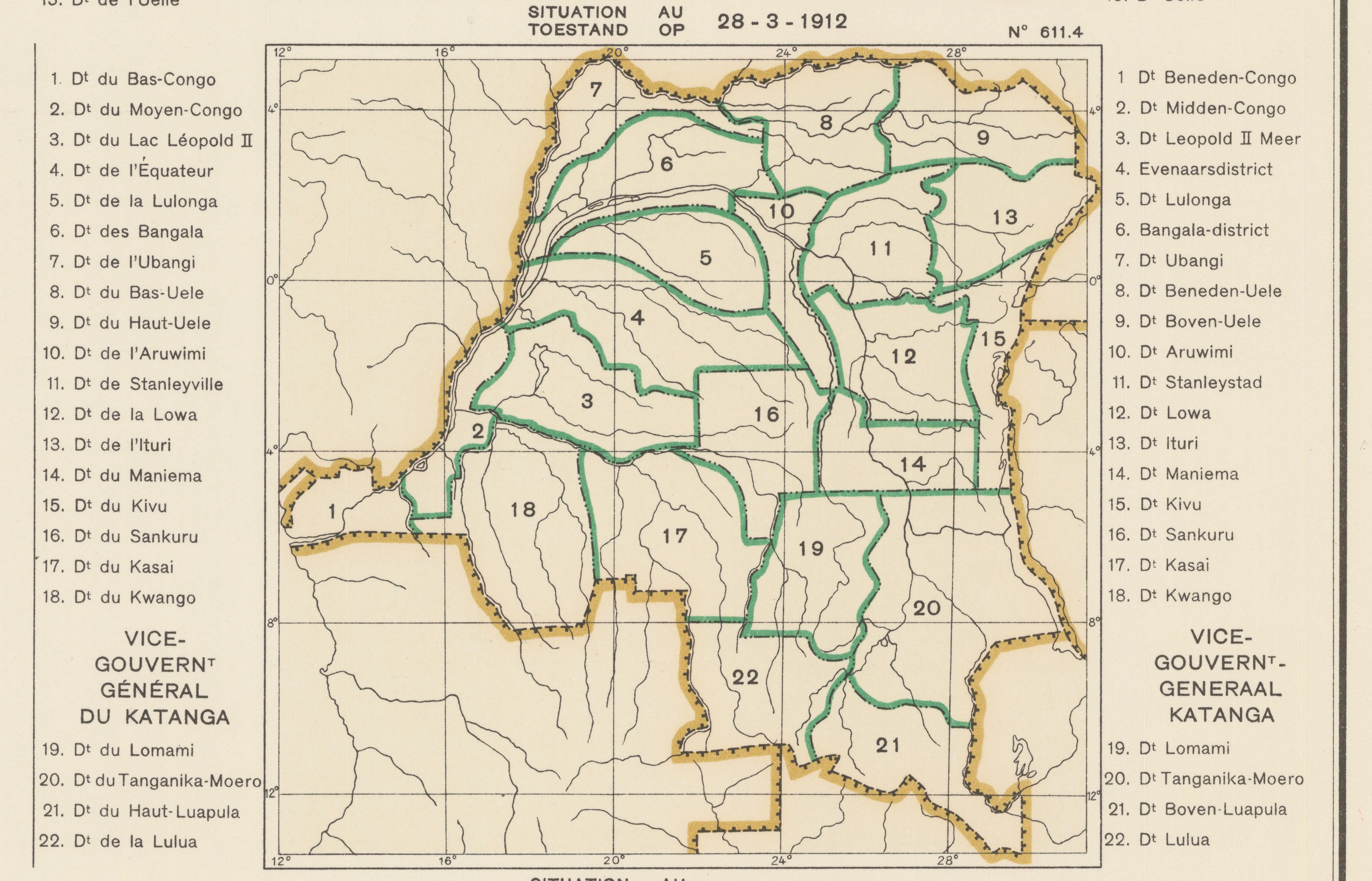
Districts of the Belgian Congo in 1912

Date	Event
20 May	Félix Fuchs replaces Théophile Wahis as governor-general

== See also ==
- Belgian Congo
- History of the Democratic Republic of the Congo
