= 1892 in the Congo Free State =

- Decades: 1880s; 1890s; 1900s

The following lists events that happened during 1892 in the Congo Free State.

== Incumbent ==
- King – Leopold II of Belgium
- Governor-general – Camille Janssen, then Théophile Wahis

== Events ==
Date	Event
3 January	Captain Alphonse Jacques de Dixmude's anti-slavery expedition founds the fortress of Albertville on the shores of Lake Tanganyika.
March	Tippu Tip's son Sefu bin Hamid starts to lead various attacks on Congo Free State, starting the Congo–Arab War.
18 April	Mission sui juris of Kwango is established
1 July	Théophile Wahis replaces Camille Janssen as governor-general

== See also ==
- Congo Free State
- History of the Democratic Republic of the Congo

== Sources ==
- Edgerton, Robert B. (2002), The Troubled Heart of Africa: A History of the Congo, New York: St. Martin's Press, ISBN 0-312-30486-2
