= 1885 in the Congo Free State =

- Decades: 1880s; 1890s; 1900s
- See also: International Association of the Congo

The following lists events that happened during 1885 in the Congo Free State

== Incumbent ==
- King – Leopold II of Belgium
- Administrator-General – Francis de Winton

== Events ==
Date	Event
	The station of Luozi is created at the point where the Luozi River flows into the Congo.
28 April	Belgian Chamber of Representatives passes a law that authorized King Leopold II of Belgium to become head of the state founded in Africa by the International Association of the Congo.
30 April	The senate ratifies the law creating the Congo Free State .
13 May	Georges-Guillaume Pagels replaces Guillaume Casman as head of Équateur Station (Mbandaka).
1 July	Francis de Winton takes office as administrator-general
1 July	Camille Van den Plas becomes head of Équateur Station.
1 August	Royal decree classifies the Luozi Territory (also called the Manianga) as a part of the Cataractes District.
25 September	Camille Janssen is appointed vice-administrator-general
1 December	Edward James Glave becomes head of Équateur Station.

== See also ==
- Congo Free State
- History of the Democratic Republic of the Congo

== Sources ==
- Bulletin officiel de l'État indépendant du Congo [Official Bulletin of the Independent State of the Congo] (PDF) (in French), 1885–1886
- La region de Luozi - Manianga [The region of Luozi-Manianga] (in French), Université de Luozi, May 2005
- Omasombo Tshonda, Jean, ed. (2016), Équateur : Au cœur de la cuvette congolaise [Équateur: At the heart of the Congolese basin] (PDF) (in French), Tervuren, Belgium: Musée royal de l’Afrique centrale, ISBN 978-9-4922-4423-9
