= 1910 in the Belgian Congo =

- Decades: 1900s; 1910s; 1920s; 1930s

The following lists events that happened during 1910 in the Belgian Congo.

== Incumbent ==
- Governor-general – Théophile Wahis

== Events ==
Date	Event
	Géomines (Compagnie Géologique et Minière des Ingénieurs et Industriels belges) is founded.
	Cominière (Société commerciale et minière du Congo) is incorporated by Belgian financiers.
5 August	Apostolic Prefecture of Katanga established on territory split from the Apostolic Vicariate of Léopoldville
	The new vice-government general of Katanga is formed in the southeast, with parts of Lualaba District and parts of Stanleyville District.
1 September	Émile Wangermée (1855–1924) is appointed governor and deputy governor-general of Katanga.

== See also ==
- Belgian Congo
- History of the Democratic Republic of the Congo

== Sources ==
- Charlet, Marc (26 July 1991), "Entreprise sur le gril: Fiche Technique : La Cominiere", Le Soir.be
- "Comité spécial du Katanga. CSK", Africa Museum
- "Congo (Kinshasa) Provinces", Rulers.org
- Lemarchand, René (1964), Political Awakening in the Belgian Congo, University of California Press, GGKEY:TQ2J84FWCXN
