= 1902 in the Congo Free State =

- Decades: 1880s; 1890s; 1900s

The following lists events that happened during 1902 in the Congo Free State.

== Incumbent ==
- King – Leopold II of Belgium
- Governor-general – Théophile Wahis

== Events ==
Date	Event
	Compagnie Industrielle et de Transports au Stanley Pool (CITAS) is incorporated, based in Léopoldville.
4 January	Compagnie du chemin de fer du Congo supérieur aux Grands Lacs africains (CFL) is granted a concession for four lines in the eastern Congo.
11 March	Comité Spécial du Katanga (CSK) creates the Compagnie de Chemin de fer du Katanga (CFK).
25 December	Félix Fuchs is appointed acting governor-general

== See also ==
- Congo Free State
- History of the Democratic Republic of the Congo

== Sources ==
- BCK - KDL - Le site des chemins de fer du Katanga, 2010, archived from the original on 4 December 2010
- "Compagnie Industrielle et de Transports au Stanley Pool . CITAS", Africa Museum
- "Les Compagnies ferroviaires", Congo Poste
- N. d. I. R. (1904), "Les chemins de fer africains", Annales de géographie, 72: 427–454
