= 1918 in the Belgian Congo =

- Decades: 1900s; 1910s; 1920s; 1930s

The following lists events that happened during 1918 in the Belgian Congo.

== Incumbent ==
- Governor-general – Eugène Henry

== Events ==
| Date | Event |
|---|---|
| 18 October | Léon Guilain Bureau (1869–1944) is appointed deputy governor-general of Congo-Kasai. |

== See also ==
- Belgian Congo
- History of the Democratic Republic of the Congo
