= 1921 in the Belgian Congo =

- Decades: 1900s; 1910s; 1920s; 1930s; 1940s

The following lists events that happened during 1921 in the Belgian Congo.

== Incumbent ==
- Governor-general – Eugène Henry, then Maurice Lippens

== Events ==
Date	Event
	The Shinkolobwe radium and uranium mine starts production.
	Charles Duchesne is appointed deputy governor-general of the province of Équateur.
30 January	Maurice Lippens replaces Eugène Henry as governor-general
April	Simon Kimbangu launches the Kimbanguism religious movement, and is imprisoned for life by the authorities.
13 September	Cyrille Adoula, future prime minister of the Republic of the Congo (Léopoldville), is born in Léopoldville.
15 September	Joseph Iléo, future prime minister of the Republic of the Congo (Léopoldville), is born
October	Martin Rutten (1876–1944) is appointed governor and deputy governor-general of Katanga Province.

== See also ==
- Belgian Congo
- History of the Democratic Republic of the Congo

== Sources ==
- "Congo (Kinshasa) Provinces", Rulers.org
- Nzongola-Ntalaja, Georges (2002), The Congo from Leopold to Kabila : a people's history, London: Zed Books, pp. 48–49, ISBN 1-84277-052-7, OCLC 46822313
- "Uranium ore, copper pacing Congo's output. American capital to have part soon in Katanga projects". The News-Herald. Franklin, Pennsylvania. 18 May 1950.
