= 1908 in the Belgian Congo =

- Decades: 1900s; 1910s; 1920s
- See also: 1908 in the Congo Free State

The following lists events that happened during 1908 in the Belgian Congo.

== Incumbent ==
- Governor-general – Théophile Wahis

== Events ==
Date	Event
15 November	Parliament of Belgium annexes the Congo Free State as the Belgian Congo.
15 November	Théophile Wahis confirmed in office as governor-general

== See also ==
- Belgian Congo
- History of the Democratic Republic of the Congo
- 1908 in the Congo Free State

== Sources ==
- Senelle, R.; Clément, E. (2009), Léopold II et la Charte Coloniale (in French), Brussels: Editions Mols
