= 1898 in the Congo Free State =

- Decades: 1880s; 1890s; 1900s

The following lists events that happened during 1898 in the Congo Free State.

== Incumbent ==
- King – Leopold II of Belgium
- Governor General – Théophile Wahis

== Events ==
| Date | Event |
|---|---|
| | Matadi-Léopoldville Railway is completed . |
| 12 May | Apostolic Prefecture of Uélé is established |
| 15 July | Stanley Falls District becomes the District of Orientale Province (District de la province Orientale), with Stanleyville as its headquarters. The district was also called Stanleyville District. |
| 15 July | Lualaba District in the southeast is split off from Stanley Falls District. |
| 30 July | Société des Chemins de fer vicinaux du Mayumbe (CVM) is created to build and operate railways in the Bas-Congo region. |

== See also ==
- Congo Free State
- History of the Democratic Republic of the Congo

== Sources ==
- "Chemin de fer de Boma à Tshela". KANGU - MAYUMBE - BAS-CONGO (in French). 23 February 2009. Archived from the original on 4 March 2016.
- Auzias, Dominique; Labourdette, Jean-Paul (2006). Congo: république démocratique. Petit Futé. ISBN 2-7469-1412-3.
- Lemarchand, René (1964), Political Awakening in the Belgian Congo, University of California Press, GGKEY:TQ2J84FWCXN
- Oliver, Roland; Sanderson, G.N., eds. (1975), The Cambridge History of Africa, Cambridge University Press, ISBN 978-0-521-22803-9
