= 1914 in the Belgian Congo =

- Decades: 1900s; 1910s; 1920s; 1930s

The following lists events that happened during 1914 in the Belgian Congo.

== Incumbent ==
- Governor-general – Félix Fuchs

== Events ==
Date	Event
	A mining camp is built to house miners and company officials of the Société minière de Bakwanga (MIBA), the basis for what is now Mbuji-Mayi.

== See also ==
- Belgian Congo
- History of the Democratic Republic of the Congo
