= 1919 in the Belgian Congo =

- Decades: 1900s; 1910s; 1920s; 1930s

The following lists events that happened during 1919 in the Belgian Congo.

== Incumbent ==
- Governor-general – Eugène Henry

== Events ==
Date	Event
	Congo-Kasaï is formally constituted as a vice-government.
3 April	Apostolic Vicariate of Belgian Congo is renamed the Apostolic Vicariate of Léopoldville
10 November	Moïse Tshombe, future prime minister of Katanga and later prime minister of the Democratic Republic of the Congo, is born near Musumba.
December	Alphonse Engels is appointed deputy governor-general of the province of Équateur.

== See also ==
- Belgian Congo
- History of the Democratic Republic of the Congo

== Sources ==
- "Congo (Kinshasa) Provinces", Rulers.org
- Lemarchand, René (1964), Political Awakening in the Belgian Congo, University of California Press, GGKEY:TQ2J84FWCXN
