= 1895 in the Congo Free State =

- Decades: 1880s; 1890s; 1900s

The following lists events that happened during 1895 in the Congo Free State.

== Incumbent ==
- King – Leopold II of Belgium
- Governor-general – Théophile Wahis

== Events ==
Date	Event
January	The garrison of Luluabourg mutinies in response to the execution of the warlord Gongo Lutete for treachery during the war against the Arabs.

== See also ==
- Congo Free State
- History of the Democratic Republic of the Congo

== Sources ==
- Gann, Lewis H.; Duignan, Peter (1979), The Rulers of Belgian Africa, 1884–1914, Princeton: Princeton University Press, ISBN 9780691052779
