= 1896 in the Congo Free State =

- Decades: 1880s; 1890s; 1900s

The following lists events that happened during 1896 in the Congo Free State.

== Incumbent ==
- King – Leopold II of Belgium
- Governor-general – Théophile Wahis

== Events ==
=== General ===
Date	Event
July	A Force Publique contingent crosses into the Kingdom of Rwanda, attempting to claim the latter's southwest for the Congo Free State. The soldiers set up a fortified camp at Shangi, where they are attacked by the Rwandan royal army. The Battle of Shangi results in a Belgian-Congolese victory, though internal issues later force the Force Publique to abandon its Shangi camp and retreat from Rwanda.
4 September	Francis Dhanis is appointed vice governor-general
	Francis Dhanis is given command of an expedition to the Upper Nile. His troops, largely composed of the Batetela tribes who had only been recently enlisted, mutiny and murder many of their white officers in what has become known as the Batetela Rebellion.

== See also ==
- Congo Free State
- History of the Democratic Republic of the Congo

== Sources ==
- Des Forges, Alison (2011). Defeat Is the Only Bad News: Rwanda under Musinga, 1896–1931. Madison, Wisconsin: University of Wisconsin Press. ISBN 978-0299281441.
- This article incorporates text from a publication now in the public domain: Chisholm, Hugh, ed. (1911). "Dhanis, Francis". Encyclopædia Britannica. Vol. 8 (11th ed.). Cambridge University Press. p. 142.
