= 1915 in the Belgian Congo =

- Decades: 1900s; 1910s; 1920s; 1930s

The following lists events that happened during 1915 in the Belgian Congo.

== Incumbent ==
- Governor-general – Félix Fuchs

== Events ==
Date	Event
	Joseph Kasa-Vubu, first president of the Republic of the Congo (Léopoldville), is born in the village of Kuma-Dizi in the Mayombe district.
	Adolphe De Meulemeester is appointed Interim governor of Katanga Province.
6 April	Belgians report that they have repelled a German attack north of Lake Kivu.
August 1915	Germans attack Saisi, 40 kilometres (25 mi) from Abercorn. Frederik-Valdemar Olsen sends a battalion under Gaston Heenen to defend Saisi.

== See also ==
- Belgian Congo
- History of the Democratic Republic of the Congo

== Sources ==
- "Belgian Congo", Goulburn Evening Penny Post, NSW, 8 April 1915
- Lederer, A. (1968), Biographie Belge d'Outre-Mer (in French), vol. VI, Académie Royale des Sciences d'Outre-Mer, pp. col. 783–790
- Moeller de Laddersous, A. (7 July 1961), Biographie Belge D'Outre-mer (PDF), vol. VI, Academie Royale des Sciences D'Outremer, pp. col.727–732
