= 1899 in the Congo Free State =

- Decades: 1880s; 1890s; 1900s

The following lists events that happened during 1899 in the Congo Free State.

== Incumbent ==
- King – Leopold II of Belgium
- Governor-general – Théophile Wahis

== Events ==
=== General ===
| The Compagnie du Congo pour le Commerce et l'Industrie (CCCI) and the Free State government form the Comité Spécial du Katanga (CSK) to administer the whole province, with its own police force. |

== See also ==
- Congo Free State
- History of the Democratic Republic of the Congo

== Sources ==
- Oliver, Roland; Sanderson, G.N., eds. (1975), The Cambridge History of Africa, Cambridge University Press, ISBN 978-0-521-22803-9
