= 1913 in the Belgian Congo =

- Decades: 1900s; 1910s; 1920s; 1930s

The following lists events that happened during 1913 in the Belgian Congo.

== Incumbent ==
- Governor-general – Félix Fuchs

== Events ==
Date	Event
	Orientale Province is formed from the District of Orientale Province, Haut-Uélé, Bas-Uélé and Aruwimi. The new province contains the districts of Bas-Uele, Haut-Uele, Ituri, Stanleyville, Aruwimi, Maniema, Lowa and Kivu.
	Forminière (Société internationale forestière et minière du Congo) begins diamond mining in Kasai.
	The Union Minière du Haut-Katanga starts to work the open pit Luishia Mine deposit of copper and cobalt.
7 November	Justin Malfeyt is appointed deputy governor-general of Orientale Province.

== See also ==
- Belgian Congo
- History of the Democratic Republic of the Congo

== Sources ==
- Derksen, Richard (1983), "Forminière in the Kasai, 1906-1939", African Economic History, 12: 49–65, JSTOR 3601316
- "Luishia Mine, Katanga, Katanga Copper Crescent, Katanga (Shaba), Democratic Republic of Congo (Zaïre)", Mindat
- Northrup, David (1988), Beyond the bend in the river : African labor in eastern Zaire, 1865-1940, Boston College Libraries, p. 83
