= 1890 in the Congo Free State =

- Decades: 1880s; 1890s; 1900s

The following lists events that happened during 1890 in the Congo Free State.

== Incumbent ==
- King – Leopold II of Belgium
- Governor-general – Camille Coquilhat

== Events ==
Date	Event
	Camille Coquilhat takes office as vice governor-general
	Lusambo is chosen by Paul Le Marinel as the main Belgian base in the Kasaï region to defend against the threat of Arab or Swahili traders in slaves and ivory who were encroaching from the east.
September	The Compagnie du Congo pour le Commerce et l'Industrie (CCCI) sends an expeditionary force named the Compagnie du Katanga under Alexandre Delcommune to Katanga.

== See also ==
- Congo Free State
- History of the Democratic Republic of the Congo

== Sources ==
- De Coster, Pieter (1997), "Biografie van Paul Le Marinel", De eerste Europese ontdekkingsreizen in Katanga 1797-1897 (in Dutch)
- Yav, André (1990). History from below: the Vocabulary of Elisabethville by André Yav : texts, translation, and interpretive essay. John Benjamins Publishing Company. ISBN 90-272-5227-0.
