= 1909 in the Belgian Congo =

- Decades: 1900s; 1910s; 1920s

The following lists events that happened during 1909 in the Belgian Congo.

== Incumbents ==
- Governor-general – Théophile Wahis

== Events ==
Date	Event
April to August	Prince Albert of Belgium travels in the Belgian Congo.
8 May	American Museum Congo Expedition leaves New York.
17 December	Leopold II of Belgium dies

== See also ==
- Belgian Congo
- History of the Democratic Republic of the Congo

== Sources ==
- American Museum Congo Expedition, American Museum of Natural History
- Tousignant, Nathalie (2014), "The Congo during the First World War", Cahiers Bruxellois – Brusselse Cahiers
