= 1911 in the Belgian Congo =

- Decades: 1900s; 1910s; 1920s; 1930s

The following lists events that happened during 1911 in the Belgian Congo.

== Incumbent ==
- Governor-general – Théophile Wahis

== Events ==
Date	Event
7 April	Apostolic Prefecture of Ubangui Belge is established
30 June	Apostolic Prefecture of Northern Katanga is established
1 July	Apostolic Prefecture of Matadi is established

== See also ==
- Belgian Congo
- History of the Democratic Republic of the Congo
