= 1920 in the Belgian Congo =

- Decades: 1900s; 1910s; 1920s; 1930s; 1940s

The following lists events that happened during 1920 in the Belgian Congo.

== Incumbent ==
- Governor-general – Eugène Henry

== Events ==
Date	Event
	The Union Minière du Haut-Katanga (UMHK), Compagnie du Congo pour le Commerce et l'Industrie (CCCI) and several other large private enterprises set up the Syndicat Foncier du Katanga to provide financial support to settlers in Katanga.
1 July	Ligne Aérienne du Roi Albert t opens a 580 kilometres (360 mi) leg from Kinshasa (formerly Leopoldville) to Ngombe.
September	Léopold De Koninck is appointed governor and deputy governor-general (acting) of Katanga Province.

== See also ==
- Belgian Congo
- History of the Democratic Republic of the Congo

== Sources ==
- "Congo (Kinshasa) Provinces", Rulers.org
- Lemarchand, Rene (8 January 2021), Political Awakening in the Congo: The Politics of Fragmentation, Univ of California Press, ISBN 978-0-520-33862-3
- Vanthemsche, Guy (2000), "The Birth of Commercial Air Transport in Belgium (1919-1923)", Revue Belge de Philologie et d'Histoire, 78 (3): 913–44, doi:10.3406/rbph.2000.4471
