= 1903 in the Congo Free State =

- Decades: 1880s; 1890s; 1900s

The following lists events that happened during 1903 in the Congo Free State.

== Incumbent ==
- King – Leopold II of Belgium
- Governor-general – Théophile Wahis

== Events ==
Date	Event
	Herzekiah Andrew Shanu supplies Roger Casement with information concerning the abuse of West African workers in the Congo.

== See also ==
- Congo Free State
- History of the Democratic Republic of the Congo

== Sources ==
- Hochschild, Adam (1999), King Leopold's Ghost, Houghton Mifflin, ISBN 978-0-618-00190-3
