= Service Star (Congo) =

Civil decoration in the Congo Free State

Black-and-white photo of the Service Star, with the ribbon and bars not shown

The Service Star (French Étoile de service) was a civil decoration in the Congo Free State (and later the Belgian Congo) created by a decree of the king-sovereign, Leopold II, on 16 January 1889. It was given to those non-natives who faithfully and honorably completed a term of service in the Congo. It was the second decoration in terms of precedence after the Order of the African Star, introduced seventeen days earlier.

The award consisted of a five-sided silver star 30 millimetres in diameter. On one side, in the centre, was a smaller five-sided gold star, while on the other was the Free State motto, Travail et progrès (work and progress). It came with a blue ribbon with horizontal silver bars attached to indicate the number of terms of service in the Congo. Vice-Governor General Paul Costermans, for example, wore the star with four bars.
