= 1894 in the Congo Free State =

- Decades: 1880s; 1890s; 1900s

The following lists events that happened during 1894 in the Congo Free State.

== Incumbent ==
- King – Leopold II of Belgium
- Governor-general – Théophile Wahis

== Events ==
14 August	1894 Franco-Congolese Treaty is signed in which Leopold II renounces all right to occupy north of the 5° 30" north latitude in exchange for French acceptance of Leopold's ownership of the Lado Enclave.
15 November	Limited partnership Vandenvinne et cie is founded, later renamed Belgika, with operational headquarters in Stanleyville ( Kisangani).

== See also ==
- Congo Free State
- History of the Democratic Republic of the Congo

== Sources ==
- Collins, R.O. (1960), "The transfer of the Lado Enclave to the Anglo-Egyptian Sudan, 1910", Zaïre: Revue Congolaise, 14 (2–3)
- Ernst, Jean-Luc, "La Belgika", Stanleyville.be
- Ingham, K. (1962), A History of East Africa, London: Longmans
