= 1901 in the Congo Free State =

- Decades: 1880s; 1890s; 1900s

The following lists events that happened during 1901 in the Congo Free State.

== Incumbent ==
- King – Leopold II of Belgium
- Governor general – Théophile Wahis

== Events ==
Date	Event
	Bukavu is established by the colonial authorities.
	The Compagnie du Kasai is established with head office at Dima.
26 July	Mission sui juris of Kasaï Supérieur in established

== See also ==
- Congo Free State
- History of the Democratic Republic of the Congo

== Sources ==
- Ergo, A.-B. (29 October 2019), "La Compagnie du Kasai" (PDF), Histoire du Congo, archived from the original (PDF) on 17 January 2021
- Kisangani, Emizet Francois; Bobb, Scott F. (2009), Historical Dictionary of the Democratic Republic of the Congo, Scarecrow Press, USA
