= 1905 in the Congo Free State =

- Decades: 1880s; 1890s; 1900s

The following lists events that happened during 1905 in the Congo Free State.

== Incumbent ==
- King – Leopold II of Belgium
- Governor-general – Théophile Wahis

== Events ==
Date	Event
May	Albert Lantonnois van Rode is appointed vice governor-general
5 November	Independent committee of enquiry into abuses in the Congo Free State, set up in response to the publication of the Casement Report the previous year, releases its findings.

== See also ==
- Congo Free State
- History of the Democratic Republic of the Congo

== Sources ==
- de Gueldre, Alain (1987), Kroniek van België (in Nepali), Antwerp and Zaventem
