= 1906 in the Congo Free State =

- Decades: 1880s; 1890s; 1900s

The following lists events that happened during 1906 in the Congo Free State.

== Incumbent ==
- King – Leopold II of Belgium
- Governor-general – Théophile Wahis

== Events ==
Date	Event
	The Compagnie du Katanga, Comité Spécial du Katanga and Tanganyika Concessions form the mining company Union Minière du Haut-Katanga (UMHK).
	Forminière (Société internationale forestière et minière du Congo) is founded by Jean Jadot.
31 October	The Comité Spécial du Katanga (CSK), the Congo Free State and the Société Générale de Belgique found the Compagnie du Chemin de fer du Bas-Congo au Katanga (BCK) to build a rail link from Bukama to Port Franqui on the Kasai River.

== See also ==
- Congo Free State
- History of the Democratic Republic of the Congo

== Sources ==
- BCK - KDL - Le site des chemins de fer du Katanga, 2010, archived from the original on 4 December 2010
- Derksen, Richard (1983), "Forminière in the Kasai, 1906-1939", African Economic History, 12 (12): 49–65, doi:10.2307/3601316, JSTOR 3601316
- Oliver, Roland; Sanderson, G.N., eds. (1975), The Cambridge History of Africa, Cambridge University Press, ISBN 978-0-521-22803-9
