= 1917 in the Belgian Congo =

- Decades: 1900s; 1910s; 1920s; 1930s

The following lists events that happened during 1917 in the Belgian Congo.

== Incumbent ==
- Governor-general – Eugène Henry

== Events ==
Date	Event
22 March	Charles Tombeur (1867–1947) is appointed governor and deputy governor-general of Katanga Province.
15 August	Adolphe De Meulemeester becomes deputy governor-general of Orientale Province
20 August	Équateur District become Équateur Province. Georges Moulaert, becomes deputy governor general of the province on 20 August 1917.
9 October	The Mahenge offensive culminates in the capture of Mahenge by the Belgian Congo forces

== See also ==
- Belgian Congo
- History of the Democratic Republic of the Congo

== Sources ==
- "Congo (Kinshasa) Provinces", Rulers.org
- Lufungula, Lewono (1986), "Les gouverneurs de l'Équateur, 1885 - 1960", Annales Aequatoria, 7, Honoré Vinck: 149–166, JSTOR 25836402
- Moeller de Laddersous, A. (7 July 1961), Biographie Belge D'Outre-mer (PDF), vol. VI, Academie Royale des Sciences D'Outremer, pp. col.727–732
