= 1900 in the Congo Free State =

- Decades: 1880s; 1890s; 1900s

The following lists events that happened during 1900 in the Congo Free State.

== Incumbent ==
- King – Leopold II of Belgium
- Governor-general – Théophile Wahis

== Events ==
| Date | Event |
|---|---|
| | The Compagnie du Katanga and the Congo Free State create the Comité Spécial du Katanga (CSK) to manage all the territory in Katanga. |
| 24 August | Order of Leopold II is established by Leopold II as Sovereign of the Congo Free State. |

== See also ==
- Congo Free State
- History of the Democratic Republic of the Congo

== Sources ==
- BCK - KDL - Le site des chemins de fer du Katanga, 2010, archived from the original on 4 December 2010
