= 1887 in the Congo Free State =

- Decades: 1880s; 1890s; 1900s

The following lists events that happened during 1887 in the Congo Free State.

== Incumbent ==
- King – Leopold II of Belgium
- Administrator-General, then Governor-General – Camille Janssen

== Events ==
| Date | Event |
|---|---|
| January 11 | The Apostolic Vicariate of Upper Congo (later the Roman Catholic Diocese of Kalemie–Kirungu) is created from the Apostolic Vicariate of Tanganyika |
| 17 April 1887 | Camille Janssen becomes Governor-General of the Congo Free State |

== See also ==
- History of the Democratic Republic of the Congo
