= 1960 in the Belgian Congo =

- Decades: 1940s; 1950s; 1960s
- See also: 1960 in the Republic of the Congo (Léopoldville)

The following lists events that happened during 1960 in the Belgian Congo.

== Incumbent ==
- Governor-general – Hendrik Cornelis

== Events ==
Date	Event
25 January	Belgium agrees to grant the Belgian Congo independence, setting a date of 30 June 1960, with elections to be held in May.
20 February	Following a month-long conference in Brussels, Belgium, the date of 30 June is set for granting independence to its African colony of the Belgian Congo. Under an agreement between the Belgian government and Congolese leaders, elections would be held on 16 May for provincial legislatures and a 137-member national Chamber of Representatives, and the provinces would then select a Senate.
25 May	Fifteen days of voting, for a 137-member Chamber of Deputies, conclude in the Belgian Congo, as the nation prepared for independence. Patrice Lumumba's National Congolese Movement won a plurality of seats, with 36.
11 June	Jean-Pierre Finant becomes president of Orientale Province.
11 June	Jean Miruho becomes president of Kivu Province.
30 June	Barthélemy Mukenge becomes president of Kasaï Province.
30 June	At 12:01 a.m. (0101 GMT), the Belgian Congo is proclaimed independent by Belgium's King Baudouin. The new Congolese Prime Minister, Patrice Lumumba, then delivered an angry speech about colonial rule.
30 June	Belgian Congo is replaced by Republic of the Congo (Léopoldville)
30 June	The Comité Spécial du Katanga is dissolved.

== See also ==
- Belgian Congo
- History of the Democratic Republic of the Congo
- 1960 in the Republic of the Congo (Léopoldville)

== Sources ==
- "Comité spécial du Katanga. CSK", Africa Museum
- "Congo (Kinshasa) Provinces", Rulers.org
- Crowder, Michael (1984), The Cambridge History of Africa, vol. 8, Cambridge University Press
- The World Almanac and book of facts 1961, New York World-Telegram, 1960
