= 1893 in the Congo Free State =

- Decades: 1880s; 1890s; 1900s

The following lists events that happened during 1893 in the Congo Free State.

== Incumbent ==
- King – Leopold II of Belgium
- Governor-general – Théophile Wahis

== Events ==
=== March ===
Date	Event
4 March	Congo Free State forces under Francis Dhanis take control of a key river city Nyangwe after a 6-week standoff that devastated the city. Of the 1000 original buildings in the city, only one remained standing.
1 April	Léon Fiévez becomes commissioner of the District of Équateur.

== See also ==
- Congo Free State
- History of the Democratic Republic of the Congo

== Sources ==
- Edgerton, Robert B. (2002), The Troubled Heart of Africa: A History of the Congo, New York: St. Martin's Press, ISBN 0-312-30486-2
- Lufungula, Lewono (1986), "Les gouverneurs de l'Équateur, 1885 - 1960", Annales Aequatoria, 7, Honoré Vinck: 149–166, JSTOR 25836402
