= Paul Costermans =

- Portrait of Costermans
- Born: 2 April 1860; Brussels, Belgium
- Died: 9 March 1905 (aged 44); Banana, Congo Free State (modern-day Democratic Republic of the Congo)
- Occupations: Soldier, civil servant

Paul-Marie-Adolphe Costermans (2 April 1860 – 9 March 1905) was a Belgian soldier and colonial civil servant. After a brief career in the Belgian Army, Costermans enlisted for service in the military of the Congo Free State, the Force Publique, in 1890 and later served in the colony's administration. During several periods of service in the colony, Costermans rose through the ranks. Between 1904 and his death in 1905, he held the position of Vice Governor-General of the Congo.

== Career ==
A native of Brussels, Costermans attended the Royal Military Academy and was commissioned a sub-lieutenant of artillery in the Belgian Army on 13 December 1880. He joined the armed forces of the Congo, the Force Publique, as a lieutenant on 3 October 1890, and embarked for the Congo the same day at Vlissingen. He arrived in Boma on 2 November.

After a brief posting elsewhere, Costermans was appointed district commissioner of Stanley Pool (Léopoldville), where he arrived on 26 May 1891. On 26 September, King Leopold II promoted him district commissioner 2nd class. He undertook major construction projects for the burgeoning colonial town. On 24 February 1892, having fallen ill, he handed over his command and left Léopoldville for Boma, where he arrived on 10 March. He embarked for Europe on 16 April and arrived a month later on 16 May.

On 6 December 1892, just over six months after having arrived in Europe, Costermans left again for Africa. He was re-appointed district commissioner of Stanley Pool. His was a nervous personality. His habit of pacing his veranda at night led the locals to nickname him gondoko (leopard). In April 1894 he fell ill again and was ordered to return to Europe. He left on 20 May and arrived on 24 June.

Costermans' second convalescence in Europe lasted a little over a year. He was back in the Congo on 6 September 1895, again as district commissioner of Stanley Pool. On 1 June 1897 he was promoted to the rank of district commissioner general. He explored the territory of the Banfumu people along the Kasai river, which had been relatively neglected owing to the tribe's reported cannibalism. When his term had ended he returned to Belgium on 25 August 1898.

On 1 March 1899, Costermans departed for Léopoldville for the third time, this time as inspector-general of the Congo Free State. On 16 March 1901, he returned to Europe. Later that year he was given a special commission to explore Lake Kivu. He departed from Antwerp for Naples, leaving Naples for Africa on 7 January 1902. This time he steamed down the eastern coast, arriving at Chinde in Portuguese East Africa. He travelled up the Zambezi river into the interior before heading towards the Ruzizi river and Lake Kivu.

Costermans returned to Europe in September 1903, but re-embarked for the Congo on 5 January 1904 with the title of Vice Governor-General to take over the reins from Félix Fuchs. His government coincided with the release of the Casement Report, a damning account of atrocities carried out in the Congo Free State. On 9 March 1905, in Banana, Costermans evaded his own security detail and shot himself dead. This is generally thought to have been in response to renewed enquiries into Congo atrocities. His body was repatriated to Belgium.

Costermans was an honorary captain commanding the artillery of the Fortress of Antwerp, a knight of the Order of Leopold, an officer of the Royal Order of the Lion and a knight of the Order of the African Star and of the French Légion d'honneur. He also wore the Service Star with four bars and the Military Cross 2nd class. In 1927, the village of Bukavu on the shore of Lake Kivu was renamed Costermansville (Costermansstad in Dutch). It has since been restored to its original name.

== Works ==
Costermans published two short essays during his lifetime:

- "Le district du Stanley-Pool". Bulletin de la Société d'Études coloniales, vol. 1 (1885), 24–76.
- "Notice sur la tribu des Ba-Nfumus". Missions belges de la Compagnie de Jésus (1899), p. 58.
