= 1952 in the Belgian Congo =

- Decades: 1930s; 1940s; 1950s; 1960s

The following lists events that happened during 1952 in the Belgian Congo.

== Incumbents ==
- Governor-general – Eugène Jungers, then Léo Pétillon

== Events ==
Date	Event
	Stade Roi Baudouin is inaugurated in Kinshasa, later renamed Stade Tata Raphaël
	Société des Chemins de fer Léopoldville-Katanga-Dilolo (LKD) merges with Compagnie de Chemin de fer du Katanga CFK to form the Société des Chemins de fer Katanga-Dilolo-Léopoldville (KDL).
1 January	Léo Pétillon replaces Eugène Jungers as governor-general.
11 April	Roger Le Bussy becomes governor of Kasaï province
22 August	Association Congolaise des Banques (Congolese Banking Association) is created.

== See also ==
- Belgian Congo
- History of the Democratic Republic of the Congo

== Sources ==
- BCK - KDL - Le site des chemins de fer du Katanga, 2010, archived from the original on 4 December 2010
