= Pierre Ryckmans =

Pierre Ryckmans may refer to:

- Pierre Ryckmans (governor-general) (1891–1959), Belgian civil servant, Governor-General of the Belgian Congo (1934–1946)
- Pierre Ryckmans (writer) (1935–2014), Belgian-Australian writer, sinologist, essayist and literary critic
