= Luluabourg mutiny =

1944 rebellion in the Belgian Congo

Date	February - May 1944
Location	Luluabourg (Belgian Congo)
Result	Belgian Congo victory

Belligerents
Local rebels	Congo

Commanders and leaders
Ngoie Mukalabushi (executed)	Pierre Ryckmans

Strength
~100 Congolese soldiers	Unknown

Casualties and losses
Hundreds of Congolese killed	A Belgian officer and two white civilians were killed

Luluabourg mutiny is a mutiny started in Luluabourg of the central Congolese province of Kasaï in February 1944.

== Background ==
The colonial government in the Congo depended on its military to maintain civil order and, above all, it depended on the loyalty of the native troops who made up the bulk of the Force Publique. The trigger for the mutiny was a plan to vaccinate troops who had served at the front, though the soldiers were also unhappy about the demands placed on them and their treatment by their white officers.

== The Mutiny ==
Black non-commissioned officers led by First Sergeant-Major Ngoie Mukalabushi, a veteran of the East African campaign, mutinied at Luluabourg in the central Congolese province of Kasaï in February 1944; The mutineers broke into the base's armoury on the morning of 20 February and pillaged the white quarter of the town. The town's inhabitants fled, and a Belgian officer and two white civilians were killed. The mutineers attacked visible signs of the colonial authorities and proclaimed their desire for independence. The mutineers then dispersed to their home villages, pillaging on the way; they failed to spread the insurrection to neighbouring garrisons. Two mutineers, including Mukalabushi, were executed for their part in the insurrection. The mutiny also spread to other locations, including Kamina in Katanga Province and Jadotville (Likasi) on February 22, 1944. Belgian troops suppressed the mutiny in May 1944.

== Aftermath ==
The revolt, which took place in spring, was a "bitter showdown" and resulted in hundreds of Congolese people and three white people being killed. Two rebels, including revolt leader Ngoie Mukalabushi, were hanged.

== See also ==
- Belgian Congo
- 1944 in the Belgian Congo
- History of the Democratic Republic of the Congo
- Kitawalist uprising
