= 1935 in the Belgian Congo =

- Decades: 1910s; 1920s; 1930s; 1940s; 1950s

The following lists events that happened during 1935 in the Belgian Congo.

== Incumbents ==
- Governor-general – Pierre Ryckmans

== Events ==
Date	Event
	AS Vita Club is founded in 1935 by Honoré Essabe under the name of Renaissance.
19 February	Office national des transports (Onatra) is established.
22 May	Leon Lubicz (later named Léon Kengo wa Dondo), future first state commissioner of Zaire, is born in Libenge, Équateur Province.

== See also ==
- Belgian Congo
- History of the Democratic Republic of the Congo

== Sources ==
- Accueil, Onatra, archived from the original on 19 June 2009
