= 1957 in the Belgian Congo =

- Decades: 1930s; 1940s; 1950s; 1960s

The following lists events that happened during 1957 in the Belgian Congo.

== Incumbent ==
- Governor-general – Léo Pétillon

== Events ==
Date	Event
12 February	Adolphe Muzito, future prime minister of the Democratic Republic of the Congo, is born in Gungu, Kwilu Province.
December	Local elections are held for the first time.

== See also ==
- Belgian Congo
- History of the Democratic Republic of the Congo

== Sources ==
- 15. Belgian Congo (1908-1960), University of Central Arkansas
