= 1939 in the Belgian Congo =

- Decades: 1910s; 1920s; 1930s; 1940s; 1950s

The following lists events that happened during 1939 in the Belgian Congo.

== Incumbents ==
- Governor-general – Pierre Ryckmans

== Events ==
Date	Event
	The football club FC Saint-Éloi Lupopo is founded in Lubumbashi.
	The football club TP Mazembe is founded in Lubumbashi.
	The football club SC Cilu is founded in Lukala.
15 May	Upemba National Park is created, the largest park in Africa.
8 July	Likulia Bolongo, future prime minister of Zaire, is born in Basoko, Orientale Province.
11 July	Apostolic Vicariate of Upper Congo is renamed as Apostolic Vicariate of Baudouinville (future Roman Catholic Diocese of Kalemie–Kirungu)
27 November	Laurent-Désiré Kabila, future president of the Democratic Republic of the Congo, is born in Baudouinville.

== See also ==
- Belgian Congo
- History of the Democratic Republic of the Congo

== Sources ==
- Kubusch, Lars; Schöggl, Hans (2021), Congo-Kinshasa (DR Congo, Zaire) - Foundation Dates of Clubs, Rec.Sport.Soccer Statistics Foundation
