= 1941 in the Belgian Congo =

- Decades: 1920s; 1930s; 1940s; 1950s; 1960s

The following lists events that happened during 1941 in the Belgian Congo.

== Incumbent ==
- Governor-General – Pierre Ryckmans

== Events ==
Date	Event
	François Wenner becomes governor of Lusambo Province
22 April	Évariste Mabi Mulumba, future first state commissioner of Zaire (1987-1988), is born in Mikalay, Kasai-Occidental.

== See also ==
- Belgian Congo
- History of the Democratic Republic of the Congo
