= 1947 in the Belgian Congo =

- Decades: 1920s; 1930s; 1940s; 1950s; 1960s

The following lists events that happened during 1947 in the Belgian Congo.

== Incumbents ==
- Governor-general – Eugène Jungers

== Events ==
Date	Event
	Sylvestre Ilunga, future prime minister of the Democratic Republic of the Congo, is born in Katanga Province.
	Our Lady of the Congo Cathedral is built in Kinshasa
	The photographic agency Congopresse is founded.
	Costermansville Province is renamed Kivu Province.
	Coquihatville Province returns to the name Équateur/Evenaar.
	Stanleyville Province returns to the name Orientale Province.
	Léon A. Hofkens becomes governor of Kasaï province.
23 March	Louis Alphonse Koyagialo, future prime minister of the Democratic Republic of the Congo, is born in Yakoma.

== See also ==
- Belgian Congo
- History of the Democratic Republic of the Congo

== Sources ==
- Bruneau, Jean-Claude (30 June 2009), "Les nouvelles provinces de la République Démocratique du Congo : construction territoriale et ethnicités", L'Espace Politique, 7 (2009–1), doi:10.4000/espacepolitique.1296
- "Congo (Kinshasa) Provinces", Rulers.org
