= 1942 in the Belgian Congo =

- Decades: 1920s; 1930s; 1940s; 1950s; 1960s

The following lists events that happened during 1942 in the Belgian Congo.

== Incumbents ==
- Governor-general – Pierre Ryckmans

== Events ==
Date	Event
	Sts. Peter and Paul Cathedral, Basankusu is completed in Basankusu.
7 August	Christophe Mboso, future President of the National Assembly of the Democratic Republic of the Congo (2001-2004), is born in Kasongo Dinga, Bandundu Province.
15 October	Lunda Bululu, future prime minister of Zaire, is born in Mwena Mulota, Katanga Province.

== See also ==
- Belgian Congo
- History of the Democratic Republic of the Congo
