= 1904 in the Congo Free State =

- Decades: 1880s; 1890s; 1900s

The following lists events that happened during 1904 in the Congo Free State.

== Incumbent ==
- Leopold II of Belgium

== Events ==
Date	Event
January	Paul Costermans is appointed vice governor-general.
15 May	English missionary Alice Seeley Harris takes the iconic photograph Nsala of Wala in the Nsongo District, showing a Congolese man with the severed hand and foot of his murdered five-year-old daughter.
3 August	Apostolic Prefecture of Stanley Falls is established.

== See also ==
- Congo Free State
- History of the Democratic Republic of the Congo
