= Kivu =

Region in the Democratic Republic of the Congo

Coordinates: 2°30′S 28°00′E

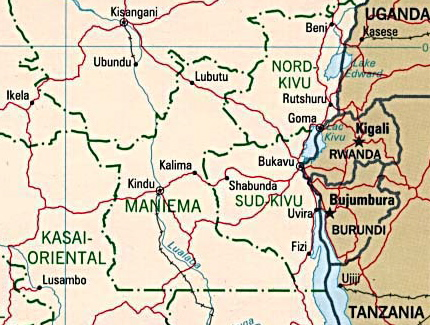
Map of eastern Democratic Republic of Congo

North Kivu, South Kivu and Maniema ("the Kivus")

Kivu is the name for a large region in the eastern Democratic Republic of the Congo that borders Lake Kivu. It was a Région (read 'province') of the country under the rule of Mobutu Sese Seko from 1966 to 1988. As an official Région in 1986 it was divided into the three "Sub-Regions" (Sous-Régions in French) of: Nord-Kivu, Sud-Kivu and Maniema, Those three became the current provinces in the reorganization of 1988. The capital of the Kivu Region was in Bukavu, and the capitals of the three Sub-Regions were in Goma, Uvira and Kindu.

== History ==
Kivu has been repeatedly subjected to major conflicts since the early 20th century. Under Belgian colonial rule, it was the site of several religious revolts such as the 1944 Kivu uprising. Following independence, it was a battleground of the Simba rebellion, First Congo War, and Second Congo War, and has been the site of an ongoing military conflict since the early 2000s. In 2025 substantial parts of the area came under the control of the March 23 Movement.

From August 2018 to June 2020, an Ebola epidemic affected the region.

== Geography ==
Kivu is also the name for the entire region surrounding Lake Kivu, including the portions in Rwanda which contain the vast majority of the lake area's population (the contiguous towns of Goma in the Democratic Republic of Congo and Gisenyi in Rwanda, with a combined population approaching 1,000,000, form the largest urbanised area in the Lake Kivu area). The area is characterized by lush vegetation and an extended growing season due in part to its high elevation (1500 m or 4900 ft at the lakeshore) and the volcanic nature of its soil. The Kivu region represents the high point of the East African Rift Valley.

The lake itself contains a massive amount of carbon dioxide in its depths, and there is some concern that tectonic activity (rifting) and/or volcanic activity might cause a limnic eruption, a sudden release of this captured carbon dioxide. If this were to happen it would devastate the population around the lake; however, the likelihood of this occurring is in dispute.

=== Approximate correspondence between historical and current provinces ===
Approximate correspondence between historical and current provinces
Belgian Congo				Republic of the Congo		Zaire		Democratic Republic of the Congo	
1908	1919	1932	1947	1963	1966	1971	1988	1997	2015
22 districts	4 provinces	6 provinces	6 provinces	21 provinces + capital	8 provinces + capital	8 provinces + capital	11 provinces	11 provinces	26 provinces
Bas-Uele	Orientale	Stanleyville	Orientale	Uele	Orientale	Haut-Zaïre		Orientale	Bas-Uele
Haut-Uele	Orientale	Stanleyville	Orientale	Uele	Orientale	Haut-Zaïre		Orientale	Haut-Uele
Ituri	Orientale	Stanleyville	Orientale	Kibali-Ituri	Orientale	Haut-Zaïre		Orientale	Ituri
Stanleyville	Orientale	Stanleyville	Orientale	Haut-Congo	Orientale	Haut-Zaïre		Orientale	Tshopo
Aruwimi	Orientale	Stanleyville	Orientale	Haut-Congo	Orientale	Haut-Zaïre		Orientale	Tshopo
Maniema	Orientale	Costermansville	Kivu	Maniema	Kivu		Maniema		
Lowa	Orientale	Costermansville	Kivu	Maniema	Kivu		Maniema		
Kivu	Orientale	Costermansville	Kivu	Nord-Kivu	Kivu		Nord-Kivu		
Kivu	Orientale	Costermansville	Kivu	Kivu-Central	Kivu		Sud-Kivu		
