= 1955 in the Belgian Congo =

- Decades: 1930s; 1940s; 1950s; 1960s

The following lists events that happened during 1955 in the Belgian Congo.

== Incumbent ==
- Governor-general – Léo Pétillon

== Events ==
Date	Event
	Presbyterian Community in Kinshasa is founded in 1955 in Léopoldville by the American Presbyterian Congo Mission.
	Université officielle du Congo et du Ruanda-Urundi (now the University of Lubumbashi]) is opened in Lubumbashi by the University of Liège .
	Football club AS Nika is founded in Kisangani.
3 March	Air Brousse is established as a private enterprise.
20 April	Jean Paelinck becomes governor of Kasaï province
1 October	Antoine Lamborelle becomes governor of Kasaï province

== See also ==
- Belgian Congo
- History of the Democratic Republic of the Congo

== Sources ==
- Guttery, Ben R. (1998), Encyclopedia of African Airlines, Jefferson, NC: McFarland & Company, ISBN 0-7864-0495-7
- Kubusch, Lars; Schöggl, Hans (2021), Congo-Kinshasa (DR Congo, Zaire) - Foundation Dates of Clubs, Rec.Sport.Soccer Statistics Foundation
- Lubumbashi, Britannica
