= 1938 in the Belgian Congo =

- Decades: 1910s; 1920s; 1930s; 1940s; 1950s

The following lists events that happened during 1938 in the Belgian Congo.

== Incumbents ==
- Governor-general – Pierre Ryckmans

== Events ==
Date	Event
	The football club AS Dragons/Bilima is founded in Kinshasa
	Kolwezi is founded as the headquarters for the western mining group of the Union Minière du Haut-Katanga.
13 June	Garamba National Park is established with an area of a 4,900 km^{2} (1,900 sq mi) in northeastern Democratic Republic of the Congo.
4 August	Jean Nguza Karl-i-Bond, future prime minister of Zaire, is born in Musumba, Lualaba District.

== See also ==
- Belgian Congo
- History of the Democratic Republic of the Congo

== Sources ==
- De Merode, E.; Hillman-Smith, K.; Nicholas, A.; Ndey, A.; Likango, M. (2000). "The spatial correlates of wildlife distribution around Garamba National Park, Democratic Republic of Congo". International Journal of Remote Sensing. 21 (13–14): 2665–2683. doi:10.1080/01431160050110223. S2CID 3495760.
