= Herman Ledeganck =

Belgian diplomat and colonial administrator

Vice Governor-General of the Congo Free State
- In office 31 January 1888 – January 1889
- Governor-General: Camille Janssen
- Preceded by: Camille Janssen
- Succeeded by: Henri Gondry (acting)

Personal details
- Born: Herman Thomas Marie Ledeganck; 2 February 1841 Zomergem, Belgium
- Died: 17 November 1908 (aged 66)

Herman Thomas Marie Ledeganck (2 February 1841 – 17 November 1908) was a Belgian diplomat and colonial administrator who served as vice governor-general of the Congo Free State from 1888 until 1889. Ledeganck was born in Zomergem the son of a Flemish poet.

== Career ==
Ledeganck entered the foreign service and served as a consul-general first at Batavia in the Dutch East Indies and later at Cologne in Germany before he was picked to serve as deputy to Governor-General Camille Janssen in the Congo. He was appointed on 31 January 1888, embarked at Lisbon for the Congo on 6 February and arrived at Boma on 1 March. He had a large workload in the Congo, but he offered his resignation on 1 January 1889. Leaving the administration in the hands of the inspector-general, Henri Gondry, he embarked at Banana on 17 April and landed in Europe on 19 May.

In 1893 Ledeganck became consul-general and chargé d'affaires in Venezuela and in 1895 consul-general and chargé d'affaires in Siam. In 1899, he became consul-general and chargé d'affaires at Buenos Aires and also resident minister for the Belgian government to the governments of Argentina, Paraguay and Uruguay. In 1908 he was consul-general in Tunis with responsibility for Algeria, Tunisia and Tripolitania. He died while in Tunis.

For his services, Ledeganck became a commander of the Order of Leopold and holder of the Civic Cross of either the 1st or 2nd class. He also became a Grand Officer (2nd class) of the Order of the Liberator of Venezuela and Knight Commander (2nd class) of the Order of the Crown of Siam.

== Notes ==
- Herman Ledeganck, Royal Museum for Central Africa
