= Henri Gondry =

Belgian civil servant and colonial administrator

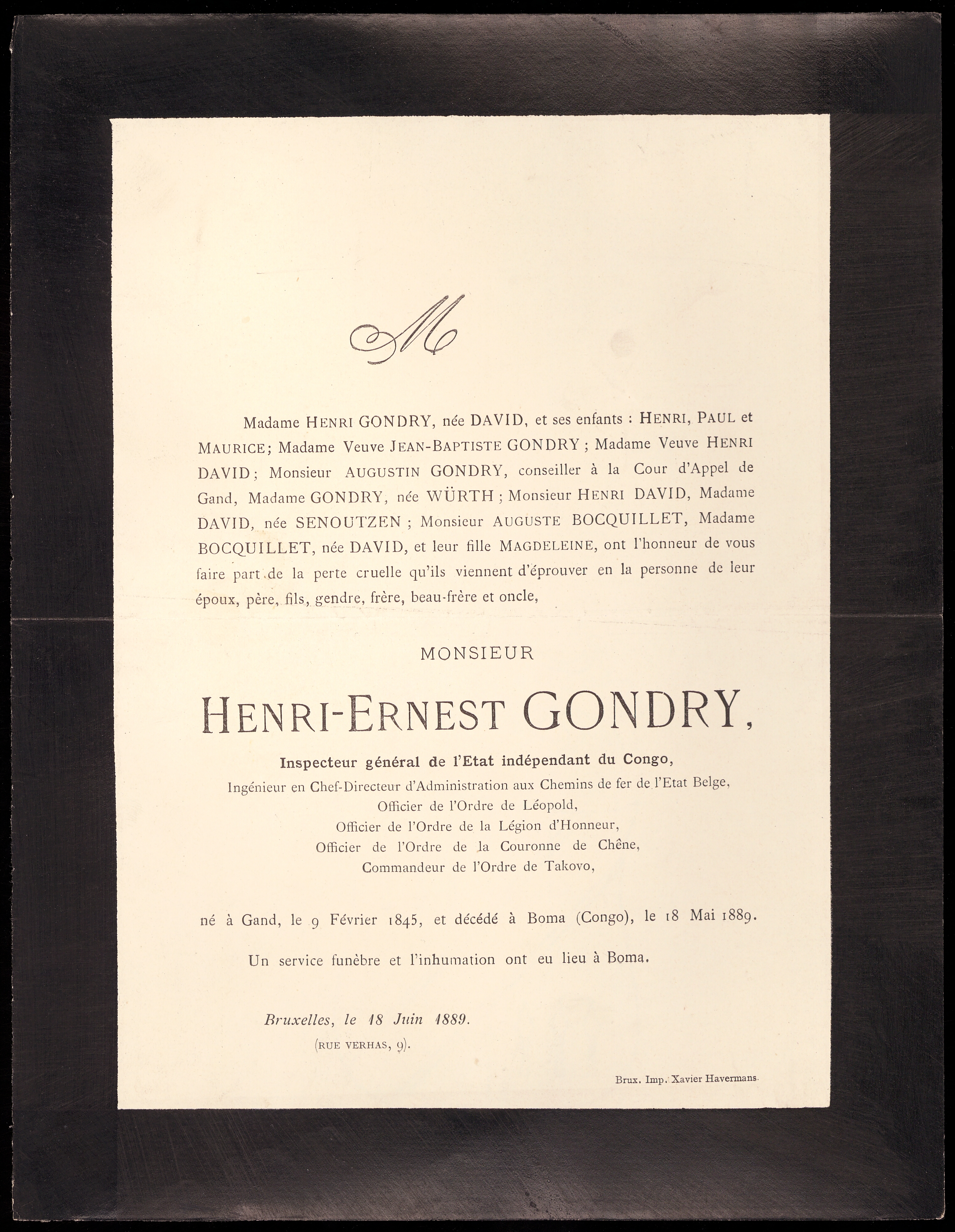
Gondry's death notice

Henri Ernest Gondry (9 February 1845 – 18 May 1889) was a Belgian civil servant and colonial administrator who served as inspector-general and acting vice governor-general of the Congo Free State briefly in 1889.

Born in Ghent, Gondry became an honorary engineer of bridges and roads (ingénieur honoraire des ponts et chaussées) and was the administrative director of the Belgian State Railways when he was called to serve in the Congo. He was appointed inspector-general under Vice Governor-General Herman Ledeganck and Governor-General Camille Janssen, a post which would require him to act as governor-general in the absence of both men. He was, in fact, the first Congolese functionary drawn from the Belgian civil service, and he brought a high level of professionalism to his colonial duties.

Gondry was appointed on 1 January 1889, embarked at Lisbon on 6 January and arrived in Boma on 31 January. He was received by Ledeganck, who, having submitted his resignation on the same day Gondry was appointed, was preparing to return to Europe. As a result, from Ledeganck's departure on 17 April the government was in Gondry's hands. He was zealous for the cause and completely taken with King Leopold II's vision for the Congo, as attested by his letters. He died of cerebral congestion just over a month later. His death is usually attributed to overwork.
