= 1936 in the Belgian Congo =

- Decades: 1910s; 1920s; 1930s; 1940s; 1950s

The following lists events that happened during 1936 in the Belgian Congo.

== Incumbents ==
- Governor-general – Pierre Ryckmans

== Events ==
Date	Event
1 January	Mayumbe line is integrated with the Office des transports coloniaux (OTRACO).CITEREFBCK_-_KDL
22 February	Daring Club Motema Pembe is created under the name Falcon Daring by Raphaël de la Kethulle de Ryhove, a missionary of the Congregation of Scheutistes.

== See also ==
- Belgian Congo
- History of the Democratic Republic of the Congo

== Sources ==
- "BCK - KDL - Le site des chemins de fer du Katanga". Archived from the original on 4 December 2010.
