= 1959 in the Belgian Congo =

- Decades: 1930s; 1940s; 1950s; 1960s

The following lists events that happened during 1959 in the Belgian Congo.

== Incumbent ==
- Governor-general – Hendrik Cornelis

== Events ==
Date	Event
	Theological School of Northern Congo (École de Théologie au Congo du Nord) is established (today University Shalom of Bunia).
	Protestant University in Congo is established in the neighborhood called Lingwala, in the Lukunga District of Kinshasa.
4 January	Riots break out in Léopoldville after police broke up a meeting of the independence group ABAKO. After two days, 47 people, all Congolese, had been killed and 379 Africans and Europeans had been injured.
	Parti Solidaire Africain is established after the Léopoldville riots.
10 November	Apostolic Vicariate of Léopoldville is elevated to Archdiocese of Léopoldville
10 November	Apostolic Vicariate of Baudouinville is promoted as Diocese of Baudouinville (future Roman Catholic Diocese of Kalemie–Kirungu)
15 November	Antipas Mbusa, future senior politician in the Democratic Republic of the Congo, is born in North Kivu.
24 December	The colonial government in the Belgian Congo formally recognizes the legality of the Kimbanguist Church.

== See also ==
- Belgian Congo
- History of the Democratic Republic of the Congo

== Sources ==
- Gondola, Ch. Didier (2002), The History of Congo, Greenwood Publishing Group
