= 1953 in the Belgian Congo =

- Decades: 1930s; 1940s; 1950s; 1960s

The following lists events that happened during 1953 in the Belgian Congo.

== Incumbent ==
- Governor-general – Léo Pétillon

== Events ==
| Date | Event |
|---|---|
| 13 March | Luc Breuls de Tiecken (b. 1900) becomes governor of Orientale Province. |
| 24 March | Apostolic Prefecture of Mweka is created on territory split off from the then Apostolic Vicariate of Luluabourg |
| 24 March | Apostolic Vicariate of Kabinda is created from the Apostolic Vicariate of Luluabourg |
| 29 June | Apostolic Vicariate of Inongo is established from the Apostolic Vicariate of Léopoldville |

== See also ==
- Belgian Congo
- History of the Democratic Republic of the Congo

== Sources ==
- "Congo (Kinshasa) Provinces", Rulers.org
