= 1958 in the Belgian Congo =

- Decades: 1930s; 1940s; 1950s; 1960s

The following lists events that happened during 1958 in the Belgian Congo.

== Incumbent ==
- Governor-general – Léo Pétillon then Hendrik Cornelis

== Events ==
Date	Event
	The football club TS Malekesa is founded in Kisangani.
	The Mouvement National Congolais political organization dedicated to achieving independence is founded.
24 February	The Apostolic Prefecture of Doruma is established from the Apostolic Vicariate of Niangara.
1 July	Louis De Jaegher becomes governor of Kasaï province.
12 July	Hendrik Cornelis replaces Léo Pétillon as governor-general
22 December	Pierre Leroy (1909–1985) becomes governor of Orientale Province.

== See also ==
- Belgian Congo
- History of the Democratic Republic of the Congo

== Sources ==
- "Congo (Kinshasa) Provinces", Rulers.org
- Kubusch, Lars; Schöggl, Hans (2021), Congo-Kinshasa (DR Congo, Zaire) - Foundation Dates of Clubs, Rec.Sport.Soccer Statistics Foundation
- Zeilig, Leo (2008), Lumumba: Africa's Lost Leader, London: Haus, ISBN 9781905791026
