= 1944 in the Belgian Congo =

- Decades: 1920s; 1930s; 1940s; 1950s; 1960s

The following lists events that happened during 1944 in the Belgian Congo.

== Incumbent ==
- Governor-General – Pierre Ryckmans

== Events ==
Date	Event
Spring	Kitawalist uprising: an uprising took place in Kivu in the eastern Belgian Congo. The cause of the revolt lay in Belgian authority's taxation and communal labor policies, which the Watchtower Movement denounced as ungodly.
	Luluabourg mutiny
July	Albert de Beauffort becomes governor of Lusambo Province

== See also ==
- Belgian Congo
- History of the Democratic Republic of the Congo
