= 1950 in the Belgian Congo =

- Decades: 1930s; 1940s; 1950s; 1960s

The following lists events that happened during 1950 in the Belgian Congo.

== Incumbents ==
- Governor-general – Eugène Jungers

== Events ==
Date	Event
	The Bakongo cultural association ABAKO is formed as an alternative to a political association, which was illegal.
	Pierre Nauwelaert is appointed governor of the province of Équateur.
1 October	Joseph-Paul Brasseur (1899–1956) becomes governor of Orientale Province.

== See also ==
- Belgian Congo
- History of the Democratic Republic of the Congo

== Sources ==
- "Belgian Congo", Encyclopaedia Britannica
- "Congo (Kinshasa) Provinces", Rulers.org
