= 1954 in the Belgian Congo =

- Decades: 1930s; 1940s; 1950s; 1960s

The following lists events that happened during 1954 in the Belgian Congo.

== Incumbent ==
- Governor-general – Léo Pétillon

== Events ==
Date	Event
	Lovanium University established near Kinshasa, predecessor of the University of Kinshasa
30 March	André Schöller (b. 1908) becomes governor of Orientale Province.

== See also ==
- Belgian Congo
- History of the Democratic Republic of the Congo

== Sources ==
- "Congo (Kinshasa) Provinces", Rulers.org
