= 1951 in the Belgian Congo =

- Decades: 1930s; 1940s; 1950s; 1960s

The following lists events that happened during 1951 in the Belgian Congo.

== Incumbent ==
- Governor-general – Eugène Jungers

== Events ==
Date	Event
14 June	Apostolic Prefecture of Kole is established
14 June	Apostolic Prefecture of Isangi created on territories split off from the then Apostolic Vicariate of Basankusu, Apostolic Vicariate of Coquilhatville, Apostolic Vicariate of Lisala and Apostolic Vicariate of Stanleyville
8 October	Ernest Bock become governor of Orientale Province for a second term.

== See also ==
- Belgian Congo
- History of the Democratic Republic of the Congo

== Sources ==
- "Congo (Kinshasa) Provinces", Rulers.org
