= 1948 in the Belgian Congo =

- Decades: 1920s; 1930s; 1940s; 1950s; 1960s

The following lists events that happened during 1948 in the Belgian Congo.

== Incumbents ==
- Governor-general – Eugène Jungers

== Events ==
| Date | Event |
|---|---|
| | The football club CS Don Bosco is founded in Lubumbashi. |
| | Ngoma (record label) is created by the Greek businessman Nicolas Jéronimidis. |
| 8 July | Apostolic Prefecture of Lac Moero is created from the Apostolic Vicariate of Lulua and Central Katanga |
| 19 July | Firmin Peigneux becomes governor of Kasaï province |

== See also ==
- Belgian Congo
- History of the Democratic Republic of the Congo

== Sources ==
- Kubusch, Lars; Schöggl, Hans (2021), Congo-Kinshasa (DR Congo, Zaire) - Foundation Dates of Clubs, Rec.Sport.Soccer Statistics Foundation
- Stewart, Gary (2000), Rumba on the River: A History of the Popular Music of the Two Congos, Verso, ISBN 978-1-85984-368-0
