= 1956 in the Belgian Congo =

- Decades: 1930s; 1940s; 1950s; 1960s

The following lists events that happened during 1956 in the Belgian Congo.

== Incumbent ==
- Governor-general – Léo Pétillon

== Events ==
Date	Event
	South Kivu Sugar Refinery is founded in Kiliba, South Kivu.
	Alphonse De Valkeneer is appointed acting governor of the province of Équateur.
January	Jean Paelinck (1906–1961) is appointed governor of Katanga Province.
20 February	Bruno Tshibala, future prime minister of the Democratic Republic of the Congo, is born in Gandajika.
June	OK Jazz, later renamed TPOK Jazz, is formed in Léopoldville (now Kinshasa).

== See also ==
- Belgian Congo
- History of the Democratic Republic of the Congo

== Sources ==
- "Congo (Kinshasa) Provinces", Rulers.org
- "Franco Luambo Makiadi and TP OK Jazz", Kenypages.net
- Taarifa Rwanda (22 March 2021), South Kivu Sugar Factory Resumes Production After 25 Years Of Dormancy, Kigali: Taarifa Rwanda, archived from the original on 24 March 2021
