= 1946 in the Belgian Congo =

- Decades: 1920s; 1930s; 1940s; 1950s; 1960s

The following lists events that happened during 1946 in the Belgian Congo.

== Incumbents ==
- Governor-general – Pierre Ryckmans, then Eugène Jungers

== Events ==
Date	Event
31 December	Eugène Jungers replaces Pierre Ryckmans as governor-general

== See also ==
- Belgian Congo
- History of the Democratic Republic of the Congo
