= 1949 in the Belgian Congo =

- Decades: 1920s; 1930s; 1940s; 1950s; 1960s

The following lists events that happened during 1949 in the Belgian Congo.

== Incumbents ==
- Governor-general – Eugène Jungers

== Events ==
Date	Event
10 March	Apostolic Vicariate of Wamba is created from the Apostolic Vicariate of Stanley Falls

== See also ==
- History of the Democratic Republic of the Congo
