= 1937 in the Belgian Congo =

- Decades: 1910s; 1920s; 1930s; 1940s; 1950s

The following lists events that happened during 1937 in the Belgian Congo.

== Incumbents ==
- Governor-general – Pierre Ryckmans

== Events ==
Date	Event
	Stade Cardinal Malula is opened in Léopoldville (Kinshasa).
January	Société des Chemins de Fer Vicinaux du Congo opens the line from Isiro to Penge
22 February	Apostolic Prefecture of Lolo is created from the Apostolic Vicariate of Buta
13 April	Apostolic Prefecture of Ipamu is created from the Apostolic Vicariate of Upper Kasai and Apostolic Vicariate of Koango
30 August	Mpinga Kasenda, future prime minister of Zaire, is born in Tshilomba, Kasaï Province.
28 September	The first train reaches the station at Mungbere on the Vicicongo line.
1 October	Société des Chemins de Fer Vicinaux du Congo formally opens the line from Penge to Mungbere
4 October	St. Albert College (Boboto College) opens in Gombe, Kinshasa.

== See also ==
- Belgian Congo
- History of the Democratic Republic of the Congo

== Sources ==
- Omasombo Tshonda, Jean (2014), Bas-Uele Pouvoirs locaux et économie agricole : héritages d’un passé brouillé (PDF) (in French), Musée royal de l’Afrique centrale, ISBN 978-9-4916-1586-3
