= 1945 in the Belgian Congo =

- Decades: 1920s; 1930s; 1940s; 1950s; 1960s

The following lists events that happened during 1945 in the Belgian Congo.

== Incumbent ==
- Governor-General – Pierre Ryckmans

== Events ==
Date	Event
7 February	René P. Preys becomes governor of Lusambo Province.
1 June	Ernest-Camille Bock become governor of Stanleyville Province.
21 September	Léon A. Hofkens becomes governor of Lusambo Province.

== See also ==
- Belgian Congo
- History of the Democratic Republic of the Congo

== Sources ==
- "Congo (Kinshasa) Provinces", Rulers.org
