= 1943 in the Belgian Congo =

- Decades: 1920s; 1930s; 1940s; 1950s; 1960s

The following lists events that happened during 1943 in the Belgian Congo.

== Incumbents ==
- Governor-general – Pierre Ryckmans

== Events ==
Date	Event
	Faustin Birindwa, future prime minister of Zaire, is born.
	École Saint-Luc à Gombe Matadi is founded by Belgian catholic missionary Marc Wallenda. It later moved and became the Académie des Beaux-Arts (Kinshasa)
5 March	Mulumba Lukoji, future prime minister of Zaire, is born in Kipushi, Haut-Katanga Province.

== See also ==
- History of the Democratic Republic of the Congo
  - Belgian Congo
  - Belgian Congo in World War II
