= 1940 in the Belgian Congo =

- Decades: 1920s; 1930s; 1940s; 1950s; 1960s

The following lists events that happened during 1940 in the Belgian Congo.

== Incumbent ==
- Governor-General – Pierre Ryckmans

== Events ==
Date	Event
11 September	François Wenner becomes commissioner of Lusambo Province.
12 November	Jules Fontaine Sambwa, future first commissioner of state of Zaire, is born in Mbandaka.
18 November	Marcel Maquet becomes commissioner of Stanleyville Province.

== See also ==
- Belgian Congo
- History of the Democratic Republic of the Congo

== Sources ==
- "Congo (Kinshasa) Provinces", Rulers.org
