= Community of Disciples of Christ =

The Community of Disciples of Christ was founded in the Equatorial region of the Disciples of Christ Congo Mission. This work begun in 1897. The Congo Mission worked together with Presbyterian missionaries. The Disciples of Christ become one of the leading denominations in Congo, and were prominent in the creation of the ECC. In 2004 it had 720,000 members and 206 congregations and 1306 house fellowships.
