= Banana District =

- District
- Location within Democratic Republic of the Congo
- Coordinates: 5.985120°S 12.389710°E
- Country: Belgian Congo
- District: Banana

Banana District (French: District de Banana, Dutch: District Banana) was a district of the Congo Free State and Belgian Congo. It disappeared in a reorganization of 1910.

== Location ==
Banana used to be a fishing village in a sheltered cove. A map of the Congo Free State in 1897 shows the town of Banana on the north side of the bay where the Congo River enters the Atlantic Ocean. The Banana District extended a short distance along the north bank of the river to the Boma District. To the north it bordered the Portuguese territory of Cabinda, and the Portuguese territory to the south of the Congo faced it across the river.

== History ==
The people of Banana were in contact with Europeans for four centuries before the Belgians established their colony. Between November 1874 and 12 August 1877, Henry Morton Stanley made his first trans-Africa exploration, crossing the African continent from Zanzibar to Banana. During the expedition he explored Lake Victoria and Lake Tanganyika, and recorded the course of the Congo River from the Luama River to the cataracts downstream from Stanley Pool. When the first members of the International Association of the Congo (Association Internationale du Congo: AIC) came to Banana in 1878 they found the main posts of four factories, two French, one British and one Dutch.

The Congo Free State was created at the start of 1885 with Leopold II of Belgium as its absolute ruler. On 17 September 1885, the Congo Free State joined the Universal Postal Union. The next day it was decreed that post offices would be established at Banana, Boma and Vivi. The extent of Banana District was defined on 7 January 1886 as being from the ocean up the north coast of the river to and including Ponta da Lenha. On 19 January 1886, Leopold issued a decree to protect the shore at Banana from erosion, forbidding any work that would tend to damage the banks such as removing sand, earth or stones, or digging holes. On 23 April 1886, he decreed that the seat of the court of first instance of Bas-Congo would be at Banana.

At first, maritime navigation was concentrated in Banana since Boma was thought to be inaccessible to heavy vessels. Banana was the main port from which goods produced in the colony were exported to Europe, and where export duties were collected. Of the exported products, the most valuable were ivory, palm kernels, palm oil and rubber. During the months of January, February and March 1890, 25 ocean-going vessels arrived at Banana and 30 departed, compared to eight arrivals and ten departures for Boma. Later, the government marked the channels with buoys up to Boma and Matadi, and built lighthouses.

The Congo Free State founded a naval training school at Banana, and the Boma Red Cross built a sanitarium where sick colonists could recover their health beside the sea. By 1898, the district of Banana had a total of 95 Europeans in 25 houses. The Congo Free State was annexed by Belgium in 1908 as the Belgian Congo. In 1910, the western districts of Banana, Boma, Matadi and Cataracts were consolidated into one administrative unit, Bas-Congo (Lower Congo).

== Gallery ==
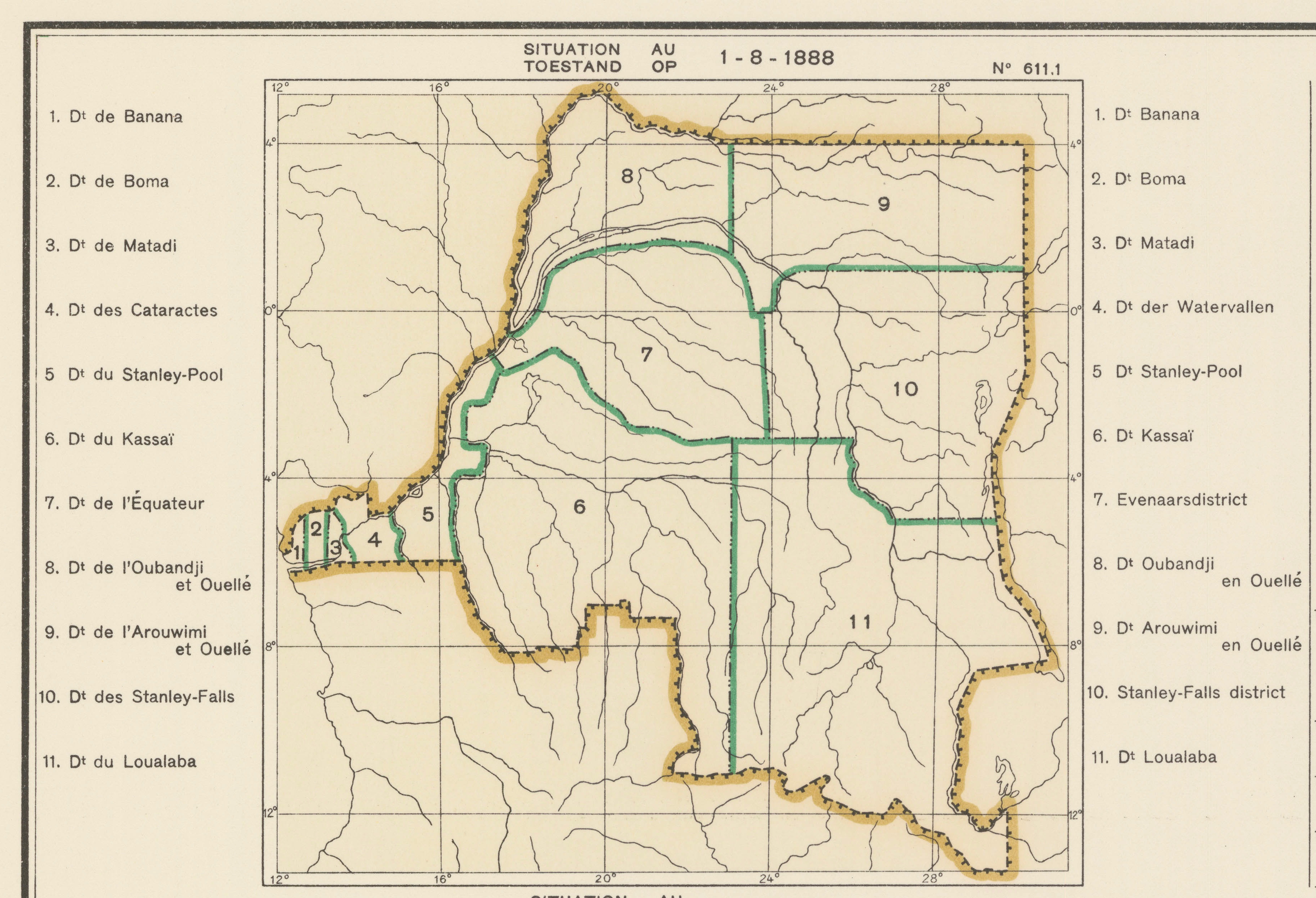
Districts of the Congo Free State in 1888. Banana furthest west

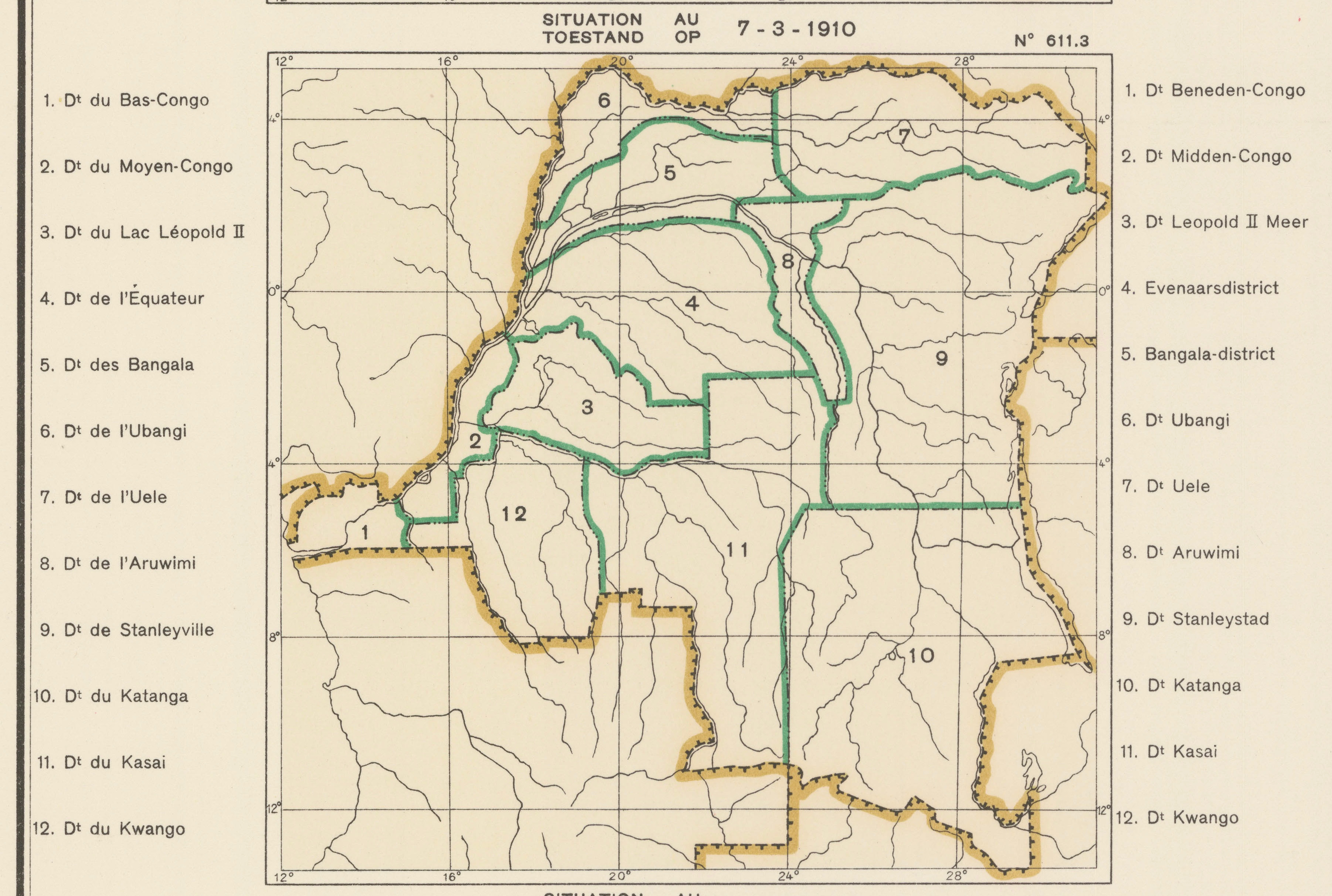
1910 districts. Banana merged into Bas Congo

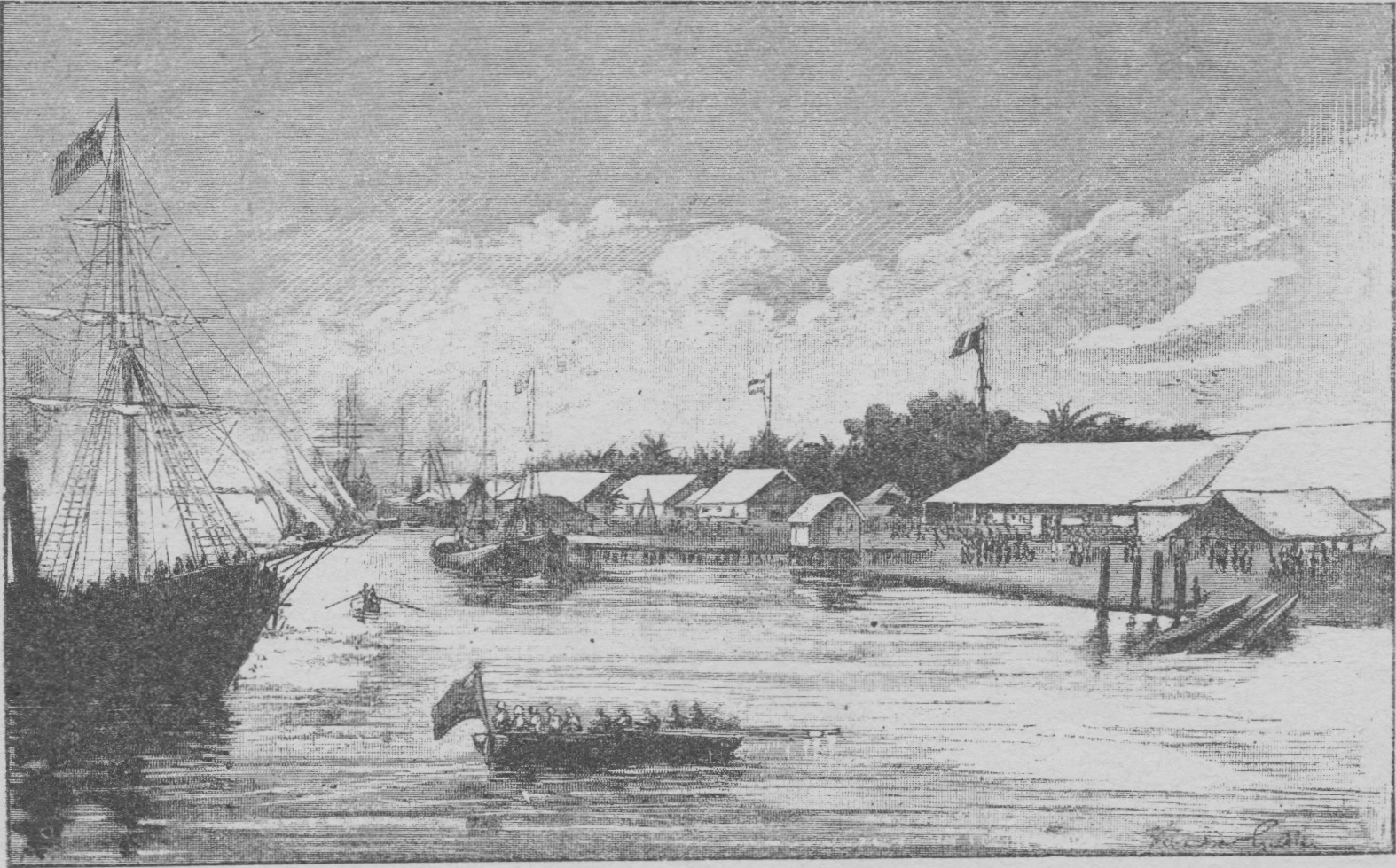
Stanley's Emin Pasha Relief Expedition arrives in Banana, 18 March 1887

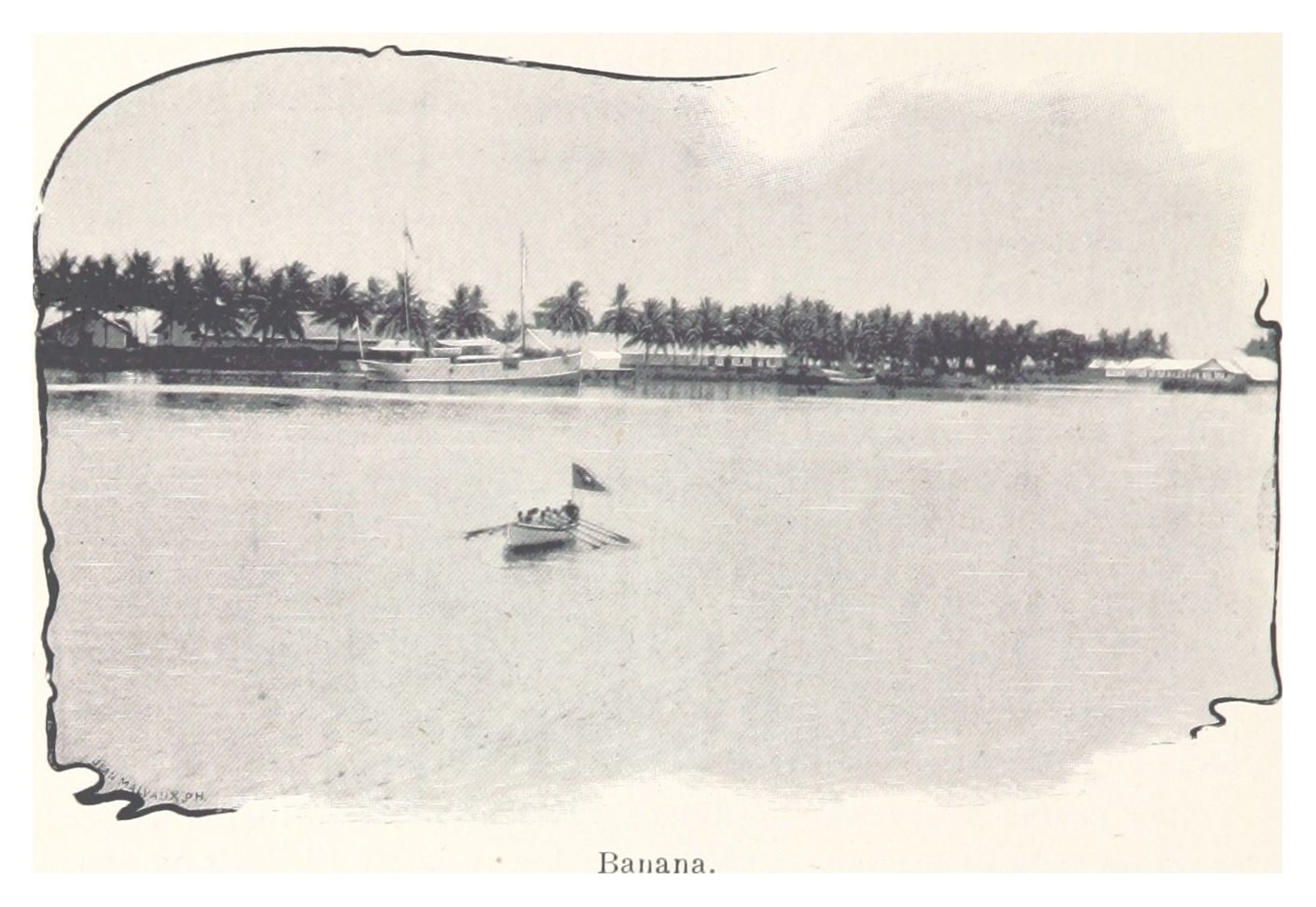
Banana in 1899

== See also ==
- Districts of the Congo Free State
- Districts of the Belgian Congo

== Sources ==
- Atlas général du Congo / Algemene atlas van Congo (in French and Dutch), Belgium: Institut Royal Colonial Belge, 1948–1963, OCLC 681334449 / http://www.kaowarsom.be/en/online_maps Archived 2017-10-13 at the Wayback Machine
- "Congo (Kinshasa) Provinces", Rulers.org
- Ergo, André-Bernard (2013), "Voyage en Congolie : Bas Congo" (PDF), L'État Indépendant du Congo, Harmattan, archived from the original (PDF) on 2022-01-22
- Etat Indépendant du Congo (1886), Bulletin Officiel (PDF)
- Lemarchand, René (1964), Political Awakening in the Belgian Congo, University of California Press, GGKEY:TQ2J84FWCXN
- Omasombo Tshonda, Jean (2015), Mongala : Jonction des territoires et bastion d'une identité supra-ethnique (PDF), Musée royal de l’Afrique centrale, ISBN 978-9-4922-4416-1
- Société royale belge de géographie (1890), Bulletin / Société belge de géographie (in French), Bruxelles https://gallica.bnf.fr/ark:/12148/bpt6k1076860/texteBrut
- "Territoire et population" (PDF), La Vérite Sur le Congo (in French), 4 (7), Brussels: Fédération Pour La Défense Des Intérêts Belges À L’étranger, 15 July 1907
- Vanthemsche, Guy (30 April 2012), Belgium and the Congo, 1885-1980, Cambridge University Press, ISBN 978-0-521-19421-1
