= Camille Coquilhat =

Belgian colonial administrator

Camille-Aimé Coquilhat
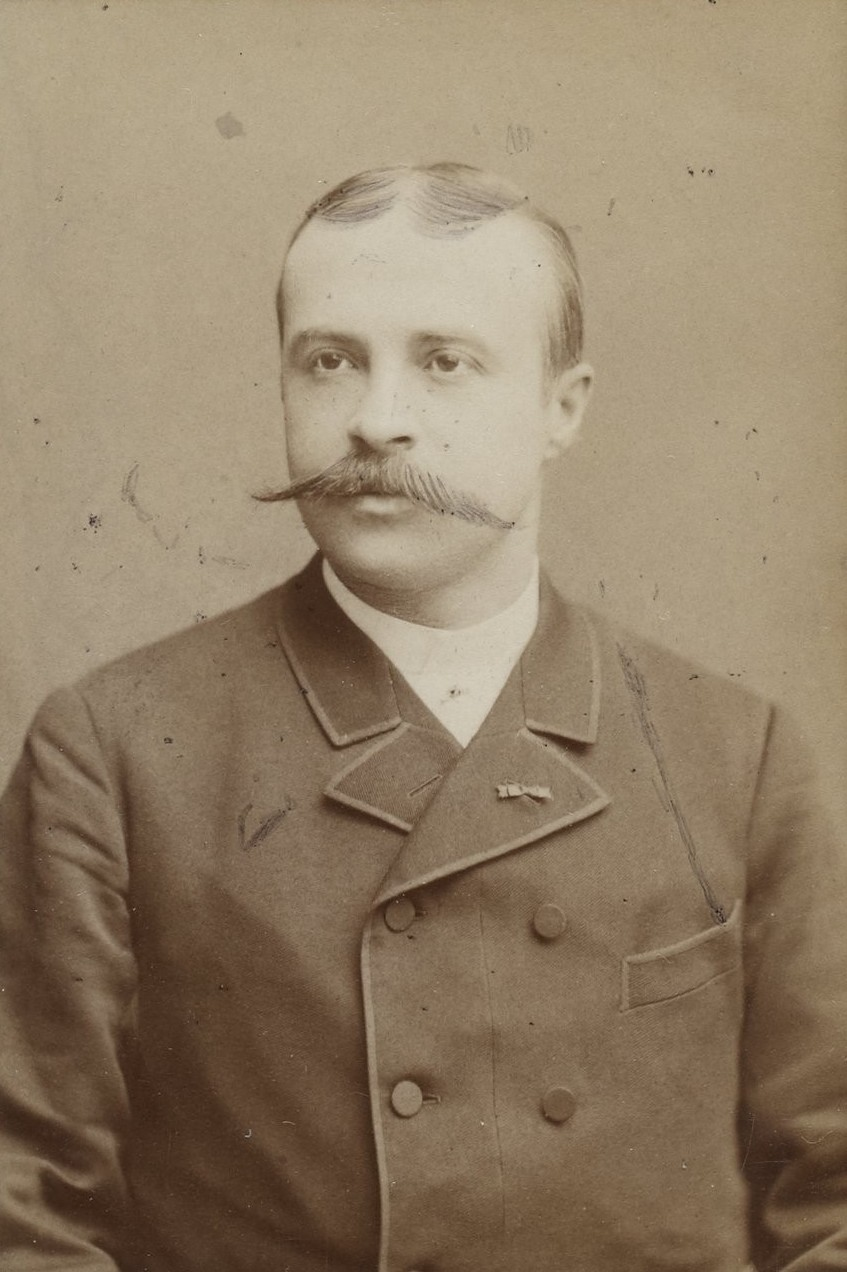
- Portrait of Coquilhat from Henry Morton Stanley's The Congo and The Founding of its Free State (1885).
- Born: 15 October 1853; Liège, Belgium
- Died: 24 March 1891 (aged 37); Boma, Congo Free State (modern-day Democratic Republic of the Congo)
- Occupations: Soldier, civil servant, writer

Captain Camille-Aimé Coquilhat (1853–1891) was a Belgian soldier, explorer and colonial civil servant who finished his career as Vice Governor-General of the Congo Free State from 1890 until his death in 1891. He was notably an associate of Henry Morton Stanley during his expeditions in the Haut-Congo during the mid-1880s.

== Career ==
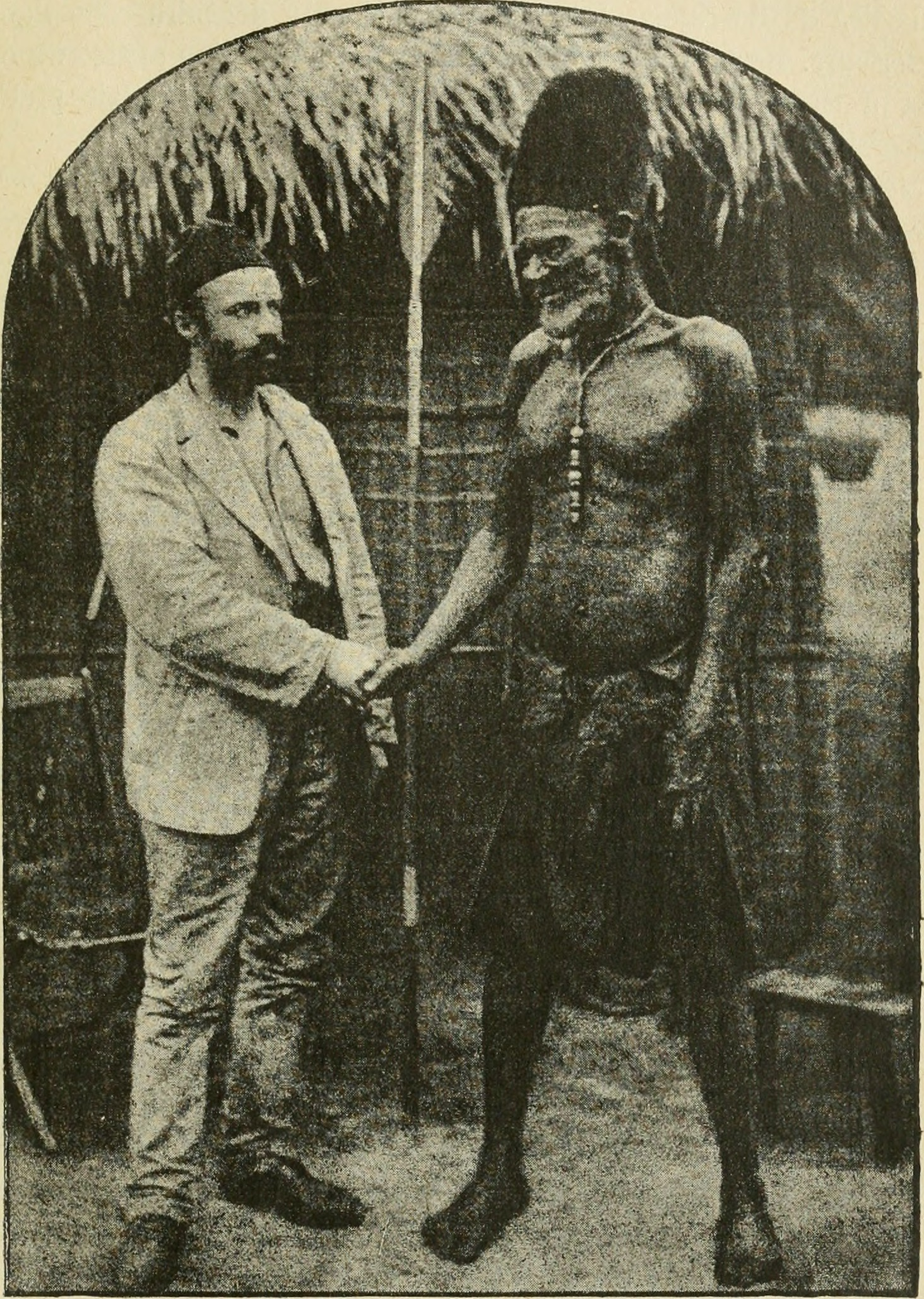
Coquilhat, pictured with the Bangala chief Mata-Buiké in c.1888

Camille-Aimé Coquilhat was born into a family of French origin in Liège, Belgium on 15 October 1853. He volunteered for service in the French Republic's Army of the North during the Franco-Prussian War (1870–71). He returned to Belgium after the conflict where he became a junior officer in the Belgian Army. In 1882, he volunteered to join the International African Association (IAA) expedition to Haut-Congo led by Henry Morton Stanley and served at Stanleyville until 1884. After this, he was involved in setting up colonial stations among the Bangala people in the Équateur region of the future Congo Free State (modern-day Democratic Republic of the Congo). Returning to Belgium for health reasons in 1885, he returned to the Congo in 1886 where he was briefly involved with fighting against the Eastern Congolese "Arabs" in the Stanley Falls. Later the same year, he was forced to return to Belgium again for health reasons where he stayed until 1890, becoming an official in the colonial administration. In 1889, Coquilhat was proposed as a replacement for Camille Janssen as Governor-General of the Congo Free State, the most senior administrative position, and sent to Congo again. Coquilhat died of malaria at Boma on 24 March 1891 shortly after his return to the Congo. His body was repatriated to Belgium where he was buried in Antwerp.

In Belgium, Coquilhat was celebrated as one of the "pioneers" of the Congo Free State and a town, previously known as Équateurville, was renamed Coquilhatville (Coquilhatstad in Dutch) in his honour. Coquilhatville was subsequently renamed as Mbandaka.

== Publication ==
- Sur le Haut-Congo. Paris: Lebègue, 1888.

== See also ==
- Cannibalism in Africa § Congo Basin

== Bibliography ==
- Engels, A. (1948). "Coquilhat (Camille-Aimé)" (PDF). Biographie Coloniale Belge. Vol. 1. Brussels: Institut royal colonial belge. pp. 250–60.
- "Coquilhat (Camille-Aimé)". Revue encyclopédique: recueil documentaire universel et illustré. Paris: Librairie Larousse. 1891. pp. 377–8.
