= Etoile mine =

Mine in the Democratic Republic of the Congo

Etoile Mine
- Location within Democratic Republic of the Congo
- Location: Haut-Katanga, Democratic Republic of the Congo; 11°37′56″S 27°34′49″E
- Products: Copper; Cobalt
- Company: Shalina Resources
- Website: shalinaresources.com/etoile-mine.html

The Etoile Mine (also known as L'Etoile du Congo Mine, Kalukuluku, or Star of the Congo Mine) is an open-pit copper mine on the outskirts of Lubumbashi in Katanga Province of the Democratic Republic of the Congo (DRC). Chemaf (Chemical of Africa) owns the license. Chemaf is 95% owned by Shalina Resources and 5% by the DRC government.

== Location ==
The Etoile mine is located at an elevation of about 1,285 metres (4,216 ft) above sea level. The climate is sub-tropical, with annual rainfall of about 1,200 millimetres (47 in) falling mostly in the October to March period. Average temperatures are between 17 °C (63 °F) and 24 °C (75 °F), with no marked difference between summer and winter. The region lies in a zone that would naturally be covered by Miombo Woodland, deciduous tropical woodlands. Lying on the edge of Lubumbashi, much of the woodland has been cleared.

The Etoile orebody lies within the copperbelt that stretches from Luanshya in Zambia to Kolwezi in the DRC. As with many of the deposits in southern Katanga, it is a stratiform copper-cobalt deposit. An enlarged oxide cap about 50 metres (160 ft) overlays an inclined stratiform sulphide deposit.

== Early production ==
Tanganyika Concessions dug pits and trenches in the area in 1907. Union Minière du Haut Katanga (UMHK) discovered the Etoile ore body in 1911, and the Ruashi ore body in 1919. For the next half century both properties were quarried intermittently for their high-grade copper ore. Originally named the Kalukuluku mine, the Belgians later renamed it L'Etoile du Congo Mine (Star of the Congo Mine).

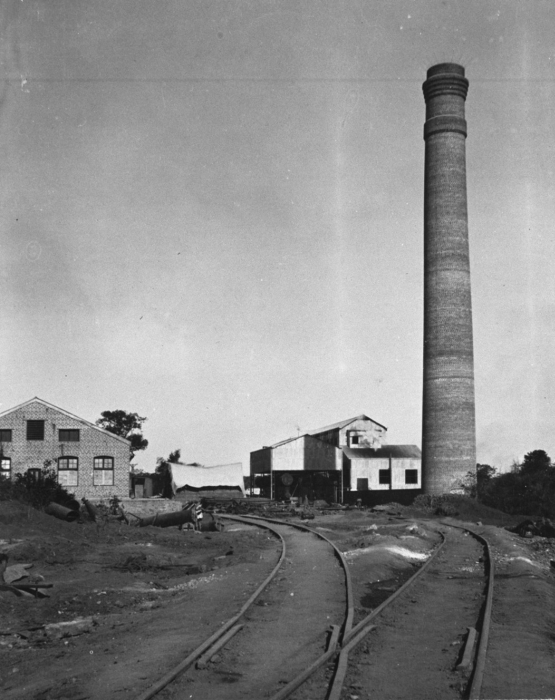
copper smelting of 'Etoile du Congo' Katanga, 1912-1914

UMHK was nationalized in 1967. Control of all copper and cobalt exploration and production was given to Gécamines, established as the state mining company. Gécamines operated the Ruashi and Etoile mines until the end of the 1960s. Artisanal miners then worked the two mines until 2000, when they were put up for sale separately.

== Recent operations ==
Chemaf gained the rights to Etoile in 2003. The mine opened in 2005, and Chemaf started production of refined copper in 2007. In 2008, copper cathode production was 11,353 tonnes. Chemaf was planning to commission a new SX/EW plant in 2009 with 6,000 tonnes/year capacity to produce refined cobalt. A 2008 assessment confirmed that there was 13.5 million tonnes of ore in the pit, graded 3.3% copper and 0.55% cobalt. The unusually high grade of cobalt means that this contributes over half the revenue. The mine produced 1,071,516 tonnes of ore in 2009.

The nearby Ruashi mine includes a plant to concentrate the ore from both mines and a modern solvent extraction electrowinning (SX-EW) processing plant.
