= Francis de Winton =

British Army officer, colonial administrator and courtier

Major-General Sir Francis de Winton GCMG CB FRGS
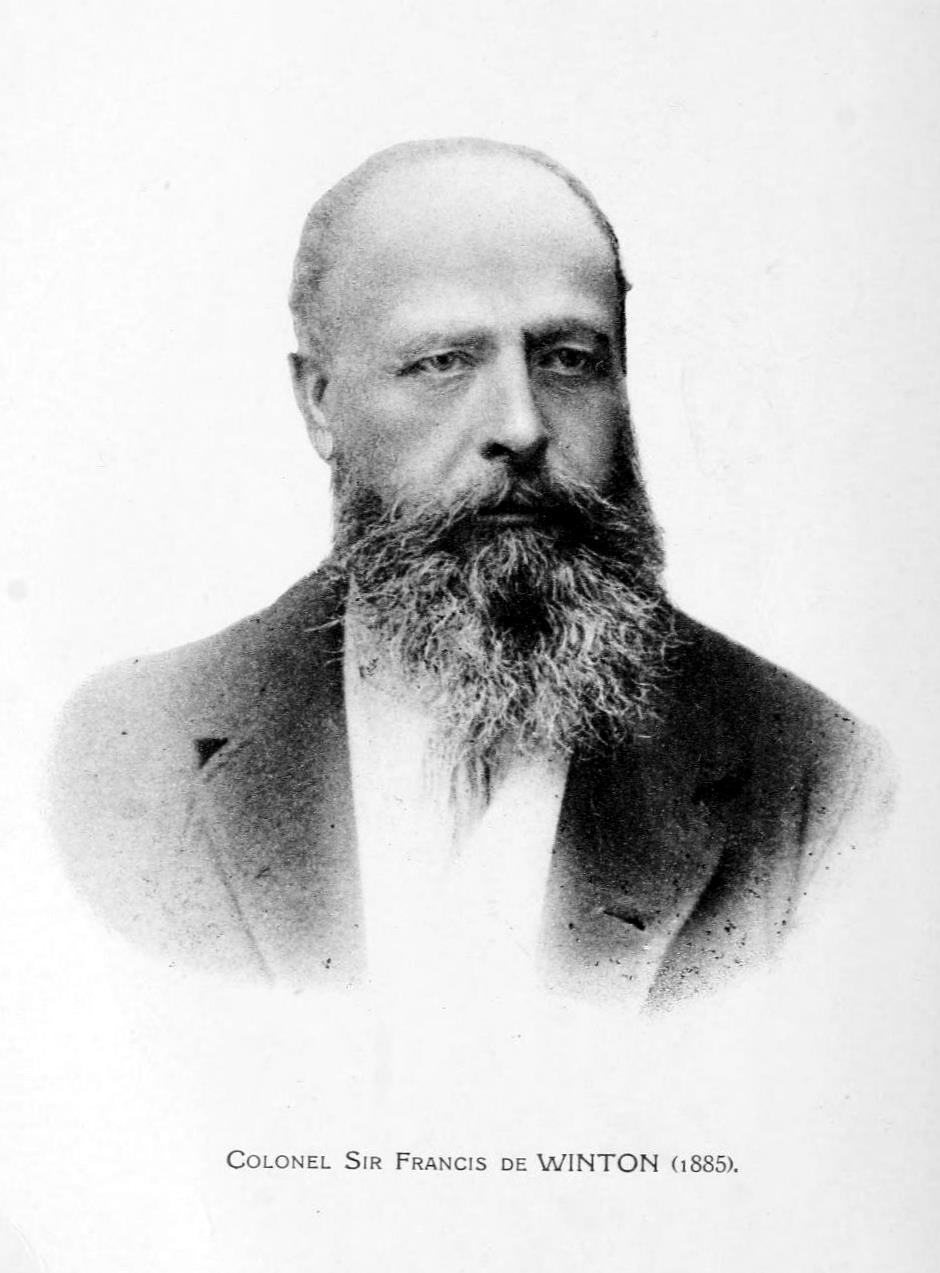
- Sir Francis de Winton in 1885

Administrator-General of the Congo Free State
- In office 1885–1886
- Monarch: Leopold II
- Preceded by: None (post created)
- Succeeded by: Camille Janssen (as Governor-General)

Personal details
- Born: 21 June 1835 Pitsford, Northamptonshire, United Kingdom
- Died: 16 December 1901 (aged 66) Llanstephan, Llyswen, United Kingdom
- Awards: Knight Grand Cross of the Order of St Michael and St George; Companion of the Order of the Bath

Military service
- Allegiance: British Empire
- Branch/service: British Army
- Years of service: 1854–1890
- Rank: Major-General
- Unit: Royal Artillery
- Battles/wars: Crimean War

Major-General Sir Francis Walter de Winton GCMG CB FRGS (21 June 1835 – 16 December 1901) was a British Army officer, colonial administrator and courtier in the Household of the Duke of York. He notably served as Administrator-General of the Congo Free State under King Leopold II of Belgium.

== Early life ==
De Winton was born at Pitsford, Northamptonshire in 1835, the second son of Walter de Winton of Maesllwch Castle and Julia Cecilia, second daughter of Richard John Collinson and sister of famous sea captains Richard Collinson and Bernard Collinson. His father had changed his surname from Wilkins to De Winton by royal licence in 1839.

== Early career ==
De Winton was educated at the Royal Military Academy, Woolwich and commissioned into the Royal Artillery on 11 April 1854. He first saw active service in the Crimean War and was present at the Siege of Sevastopol. For his service he received the Légion d'Honneur (5th class). He was promoted to captain in 1861 and served in British North America and Gibraltar, before working as military attache in Constantinople from 1877 to 1878.

From 1878 to 1883 he was secretary to the Marquess of Lorne, who was Governor General of Canada. De Winton was promoted to lieutenant-colonel in 1880 and became brevet-colonel in 1884. He was made a Companion of the Order of St Michael and St George in 1882 and was made a knight in the same order in February 1884.

== Career in Africa and later life ==
He subsequently held administrative appointments in several African colonies, most notably working as Administrator-general of the Congo Free State. As a result, he was made a Commander of the Order of Leopold by the Belgian government. In 1887 he commanded the Yoni Expedition against the Yoni people of West Africa.

He was made a Companion of the Order of the Bath upon the successful repression of the rebellion and was made Assistant Quartermaster-General at Army Headquarters. In 1889 De Winton was sent by the British government as a commissioner to Swaziland. In May 1890 de Winton, who had retired from the army on 21 June of that year with the honorary rank of major-general, was appointed governor of the Imperial British East Africa Company's possessions, but he resigned in June 1891.

In January 1892, de Winton became Controller and Treasurer in the household of Prince Albert Victor, Duke of Clarence and Avondale. Following the duke's premature death, de Winton served in the household of the Duke and Duchess of York. He was invested as a Knight Grand Cross in 1893.

== Personal life ==
Whilst in Canada, he was Master of the Hounds of the Montreal Hunt. De Winton was honorary secretary of the Royal Geographical Society between 1888 and 1889 and was made an honorary Legum Doctor by the University of Cambridge.

He married in 1864 Evelyn, daughter of Christopher Rawson of Lennoxville, Canada, and had issue two sons and two daughters. One son predeceased him in 1892. De Winton died at Llanstephan, Llyswen in 1901 and was buried at Glasbury.

He is the namesake of De Winton, Alberta, in Canada.

== Sources ==
- Leslie, J. H.; Roger T., Stearn. "Winton, Sir Francis Walter de (1835–1901)". Oxford Dictionary of National Biography (online ed.). Oxford University Press. doi:10.1093/ref:odnb/32806. (Subscription, Wikipedia Library access or UK public library membership required.)
- Archive Francis de Winton, Royal museum of central Africa
