= Royal Order of the Lion =

Belgian award for services in the Congo (1891–1960)

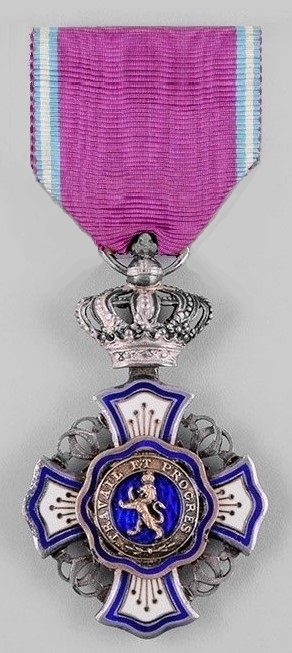
- Royal Order of the Lion, 5th class (knight)

Awarded by the King of the Belgians
- Type: National order of merit
- Established: 9 April 1891; 135 years ago
- Country: Kingdom of Belgium
- Motto: Travail et progrès (French)
- Awarded for: Services to Congo and its ruler
- Status: No longer awarded
- Grand master: Philippe of Belgium
- Grades: Grand Cross, Grand Officer, Commander, Officer, Knight

Precedence
- Next (higher): Order of the African Star
- Next (lower): Order of the Crown

The Royal Order of the Lion (French: Ordre Royal du Lion; Dutch: Koninklijke orde van de Leeuw) was established by King Leopold II of Belgium on 9 April 1891, in his capacity as ruler of the Congo Free State, and was awarded for services to the Congo and its ruler that did not deserve the award of the Order of the African Star, and were not necessarily performed from within Belgian Congo.

The order was incorporated into the Belgian honours system following the annexation of the Congo Free State by Belgium in 1908. The motto of the order is Travail et progrès ("Labour and progress"). The King of the Belgians is its Grand Master, with the order awarded by Royal Decree. Following the independence of Congo-Léopoldville in 1960, the order is no longer current, although the wording of its statutes permitted awards after this, for example for services rendered before independence.

== Classes ==
The Royal Order of the Lion has five classes and three medals:

- Grand Cross, who wears the badge on a sash on the right shoulder, plus the plaque on the left chest;
- Grand Officer, who wears only the plaque on the left chest;
- Commander, who wears the badge on a necklet;
- Officer, who wears the badge on a ribbon with rosette on the left chest;
- Knight, who wears the badge on a ribbon on the left chest;
- Gold Medal, who wears the medal on the left chest;
- Silver Medal, who wears the medal on the left chest;
- Bronze Medal, who wears the medal on the left chest.

== Insignia ==
The badge of the order is a white enamel Rupert cross with a perimeter channel of blue enamel, with the angles in-filled with filigree back to back letter "C"s for "Congo". The central disc depicts the crowned Belgian lion on a blue enamel background surrounded by a silver ring with the motto of the Congo Travail et Progrès. This again is surrounded by a scalloped channel of blue enamel. Reverse, similar to the obverse but with a central disc of red enamel with the crowned royal monogram "L/S/L" superimposed. Suspension is by means of a pivoting royal crown and ring. The plaque (or star)—for Grand Cross—is a faceted silver eight-pointed star, or—for Grand Officer—a faceted silver Maltese Cross with silver rays between the arms. The central disc is the same as that of the badge.

The medal is circular in gold, silver and bronze versions, with a suspension in the form of a royal crown with two pendilia and a ribbon ring. The obverse shows a finely ribbed central area with bead surround, with a royal lion superimposed. The surrounding circlet carries the motto of the Belgian Congo: Travail et Progrès (work and progress) – the later issues are bilingual including the Dutch Arbeid en Vooruitgang in the lower half of the circlet. The reverse is a stylised 'double L' crowned Leopold II monogram within a palm wreath.

The ribbon of the order is amaranth purple, with narrow pale yellow edge stripes bordered with pale blue, a combination of the ribbons of the Order of Leopold and the Order of the African Star. When awarded in war time, the ribbon of the order may be adorned with a silver or gold palm. The ribbon bar is worn on the semi-formal dress uniform.

=== Ribbon bars ===
- Grand Cross
- Grand Officer
- Commander
- Officer
- Knight
- Gold Medal
- Silver Medal
- Bronze Medal

== Award conditions ==
The Royal Order of the Lion was awarded for services to Congo and its ruler that did not deserve the award of the Order of the African Star and were not necessarily performed from within the Congo. In particular, it was awarded for long distinguished service in the Belgian Congo.

As with the Order of the African Star, the Royal Order of the Lion is currently administered by the Federal Ministry of Foreign Affairs, but was originally administered by the Ministry of the Colonies.

== See also ==
- Orders, decorations, and medals of Belgium

== Sources ==
- Royal Decree of 26 March 1953 Creating Palms for the Order of the African Star and the Royal Order of the Lion when Awarded in War Time (Moniteur Belge of 14 April 1953)
- Borné A.C., Distinctions honorifiques de la Belgique, 1830-1985 (Bruxelles: 1985)
- Dorling, Captain H. Taprell (1956). Ribbons and Medals. London: A.H.Baldwin & Sons. OCLC 560728514.
- Hieronymussen, Paul (1970). Orders, medals, and decorations of Britain and Europe in colour. (2nd edition). London: Blandford Press. ISBN 978-0-7137-0445-7.
- Van Hoorebeke P., 175 Ans de l'Ordre de Léopold et les Ordres Nationaux Belges (MRA: 2007)
