= Order of the African Star =

Belgian order of chivalry

Order of the African Star Ordre de l'Étoile africaine Orde van de Afrikaanse Ster
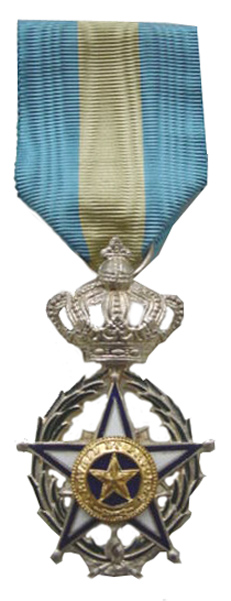
- Knight's cross of the order of the African star.

Awarded by Kingdom of Belgium
- Type: Order of Merit with five classes and three medals
- Established: 1888 (Order of Congo Free State); 1908 (as Belgian Order)
- Motto: TRAVAIL ET PROGRÈS - ARBEID EN VOORUITGANG
- Awarded for: Meritorious acts, "promotion of African civilisation"
- Status: Still living members, but no longer awarded since 1962
- Grand Master: His Majesty King Philippe
- Grades: Grand Cross; Grand Officer; Commander; Officer; Knight

Precedence
- Next (higher): Order of Leopold
- Next (lower): Royal Order of the Lion

The Order of the African Star (Dutch: Orde van de Afrikaanse Ster; French: Ordre de l'Étoile africaine) was established by Leopold II of Belgium on 30 December 1888, in his capacity as ruler of the Congo Free State, and was awarded for services to Congo and for the "promotion of African civilisation in general". It was incorporated into the Belgian honours system on 10 October 1908 following the annexation of the Congo Free State by Belgium. The motto of the Order is "Travail et progrès" (French: Labour and progress; Dutch: Arbeid en vooruitgang). The King of the Belgians is its Grand Master; although the Congo is no longer a Belgian colony, it is still considered to be a Belgian Order by tradition.

The Order of the African Star is theoretically awarded by royal decree with approval by the Council of Ministers. Following the independence of Congo in 1960, the Order of the African Star is no longer awarded, although it officially still exists.

== Classes ==
The Order of the African Star is administered by the FPS Foreign Affairs and has five classes and three medals:

1. Grand Cross, which wears the badge on a sash on the right shoulder, plus the star on the left chest;
2. Grand Officer, which wears the badge on a necklet and a smaller star on the left chest;
3. Commander, which wears the badge on a necklet;
4. Officer, which wears the badge on a ribbon with rosette on the left chest;
5. Knight, which wears the badge on a ribbon on the left chest;
6. Medals in Gold, Silver and Bronze on a ribbon on the left chest.

== Notable recipients ==
Grand Crosses

- Albert I of Belgium
- Albert II of Belgium
- Baudouin of Belgium
- Prince Charles, Count of Flanders
- Leopold II of Belgium
- Leopold III of Belgium
- Jan Smuts

Grand Officers
Commanders
Officers
Knights

- Paul Costermans

Gold Medals
Silver Medals

- Kristian Løken

Bronze Medals
Unknown Classes

- Armand Huyghé

== Insignia ==
The Badge of the order is a white enamelled five-pointed star with blue borders, surrounded by a crown of green enamelled palm leaves. The central disk shows a gold star on blue enamelled background surrounded by a gold ring displaying the motto of the order: Travail et Progrès (work and progress). The reverse is similar to the obverse but with a central disc of red enamel with a stylised 'double L' crowned Leopold II monogram superimposed. The whole badge is topped by a royal crown linked to the ribbon.

The Plaque is a 10-pointed star, with (for Grand Cross) alternating faceted golden points and rayed silver points, or (for Grand Officer) made of plain silver with alternating faceted points and rayed points. The central disc shows the obverse of the badge, including the surrounding green enamelled palm leaves, and in the top the 'double L' Leopold II monogram. The whole plaque is topped by a royal crown.

The Medal is round in gold, silver and bronze versions, with a suspension in the form of a royal crown with two pendelia and a ribbon ring. The obverse shows a finely ribbed central area with bead surround, with a star superimposed. The surrounding circlet carries the motto of the order: Travail et Progrès (work and progress) - the later issues are bilingual including the Dutch Arbeid en Vooruitgang in the lower half of the circlet. The reverse is a stylised 'double L' crowned Leopold II monogram within a palm wreath.

The Ribbon of the order is azure blue with a large central pale yellow stripe. When awarded in war time, the ribbon of the Order may be adorned with a silver of gold palm.

The Ribbon bar of the order is worn on the semi-formal dress uniform.

Collar of the Order
Ribbon bars & Decorations
Grand Cross	Grand Officer	Commander	Officer	Knight
	Gold Medal	Silver Medal	Bronze Medal	
.				.
.				.

== Award conditions ==
The Order of the African Star was awarded for especially meritorious service of any field performed in the Belgian Congo and, "promotion of African civilisation in general". Its award was rare, and though on behalf of the King, it required the approval of the Council of Ministers.

== See also ==
- Grand Masters : Leopold II - Albert I - Leopold III - Baudouin - Albert II
- Order of Leopold
- Royal Order of the Lion
- Order of the Crown
- Order of Leopold II
- List of civil awards and decorations
- List of Belgian military decorations
