= Émile Wangermée =

Belgian civil servant

Wangermée in uniform

Émile Antoine Marie Wangermée (1855–1924) was a Belgian civil servant and vice governor-general of Congo Free State from 11 April 1897 until December 1897.

Wangermée was Representative of the Comité Spécial du Katanga (CSK), effectively governor of Katanga, from 26 July 1906 until 1908, when he was replaced by Léon Tonneau (1863–1919). He was again CSK Representative from 1909 to 1 September 1910, when he became governor of Katanga, holding office until 21 March 1917. He was replaced by Charles Tombeur.

== Notes ==
- Archive Émile Wangermée, Royal Museum for Central Africa
