= Eugène Henry =

Belgian civil servant

Governor-General of Belgian Congo
- In office 5 January 1916 – 30 January 1921
- Monarch: Albert I
- Preceded by: Félix Fuchs
- Succeeded by: Maurice Lippens

Personal details
- Born: Eugène Joseph Marie Henry; 22 December 1862 Soignies, Belgium
- Died: 27 December 1930 (aged 68) Brussels, Belgium

Eugène Henry (22 December 1862 – 27 December 1930) was a Belgian civil servant and governor-general of Belgian Congo from 5 January 1916 until 30 January 1921.

He is buried in the Brussels Cemetery in Evere.
