= Félix Fuchs =

Belgian colonial civil servant and lawyer

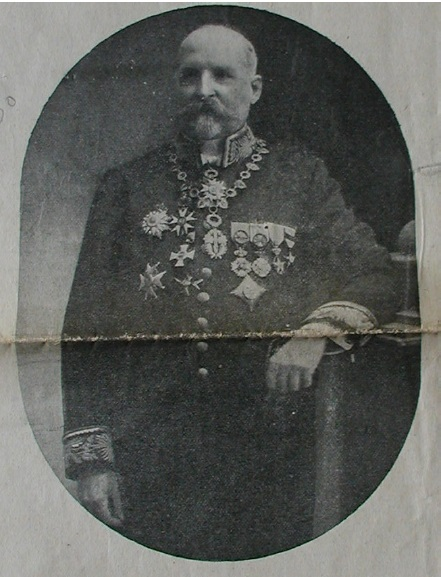
- Fuchs, pictured as Governor-General in 1913

Governor-General of the Belgian Congo
- In office 20 May 1912 – 23 December 1915
- Monarch: Albert I
- Preceded by: Théophile Wahis
- Succeeded by: Eugène Henry

Personal details
- Born: 25 January 1858 Ixelles, Brussels, Belgium
- Died: 23 February 1928 (aged 70) Ixelles, Brussels, Belgium

Félix Alexandre Fuchs (1858–1928) was a Belgian colonial civil servant and lawyer who served as Governor-General of the Belgian Congo between 1912 and 1915.

A lawyer by profession, Fuchs joined the administration of the Congo Free State in 1888 as a jurist and quickly rose through the ranks. Considered a Liberal, Fuchs's civilian background and attitudes distinguished him from the majority of colonial administrators who had begun their careers in the military. Rising to the highest ranks of the administration in the late 1890s, Fuchs eventually became Governor-General after the Congo's annexation by Belgium and presided over the Congo's entry into World War I.

== Career ==
Fuchs was born into a family of Prussian origin in Ixelles, Brussels in Belgium on 25 January 1858. He was naturalised as a Belgian citizen in 1862 and, in 1876, went to study Law at the Free University of Brussels. He later practiced as a lawyer at the court of appeal in Brussels.

In 1887, Fuchs began working for the foreign service of the Congo Free State, a state in personal union with Belgium's monarch Leopold II, which had been created in 1885. In 1888, he left Belgium for the Congo where he took a senior post at the Department of Justice and as a supplementary judge at the Congo's court of appeal. After a return to Belgium in 1889, Fuchs was sent as an envoy to negotiate the Congo's frontiers with Portuguese Angola and was named Secretary-General of one of the Congo's three administrative departments. By 1892, Fuchs had become Director-General of the Department of the Interior and, in 1893, State Inspector (Inspecteur d'état) and thus the deputy to the Congo's senior civil servant, the Governor-General. Involved in the trials of the colonial officer in the Stokes Affair of 1895, Fuchs was promoted to the presidency of the Congo's Appeal Tribunal, giving him a status equivalent to the Congo's Vice-Governors-General and remained in the Congo on senior government functions.

In 1908, in the face of international pressure, Belgium officially annexed the Congo Free State, creating the Belgian Congo. Fuchs, however, retained his position in the administration. When Théophile Wahis, the incumbent Governor-General and Fuch's rival, resigned in May 1912, Fuchs was designated to replace him as the senior civil servant in the colony.

During Fuchs's tenure as Governor-General, World War I broke out. Despite the German invasion and occupation of Belgium in August 1914 and Fuchs tried to preserve the Congo's neutrality in accordance with the Congo Act of 1885. His attitude was criticised by many of the Congo's Belgian settlers. However, after a skirmish between German and Belgian forces on Lake Tanganyika at the border between the Congo and German East Africa, Belgian forces became actively involved alongside Allied troops in the East African Campaign. In March 1915, he was recalled to Belgium by the Minister of the Colonies, Jules Renkin, and ordered to resign in September. He was replaced in the function by Eugène Henry in January 1916 but continued to hold an advisory post in the Ministry of the Colonies.
