= Camille Janssen =

Belgian colonial civil servant and lawyer

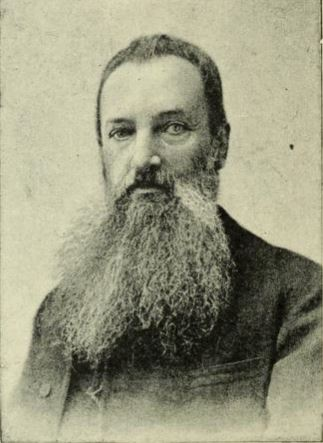
- Portrait of Janssen in c.1908

Governor-General of the Congo Free State
- In office 30 July 1886 – 1 July 1892
- Monarch: Leopold II
- Preceded by: Francis de Winton (as Administrator-General)
- Succeeded by: Théophile Wahis

Personal details
- Born: 5 December 1837 Liège, Belgium
- Died: 18 April 1926 (aged 88) Brussels, Belgium

Camille Janssen (5 December 1837 – 18 April 1926) was a Belgian colonial civil servant and lawyer who held the position of Governor-General of the Congo Free State from 1886 to 1892. After 1893, Joseph Chailley would found the International Colonial Institute, for which Janssen would be the secretary-general. His son, Georges Janssen, would become head of the National Bank of Belgium.
