= Théophile Wahis =

Belgian soldier and colonial civil servant

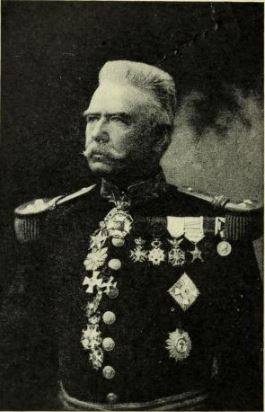
- Portrait photo of Wahis, c.1908

Governor-General of the Belgian Congo
- In office 15 November 1908 – 20 May 1912
- Monarchs: Leopold II (1908–09); Albert I (1909–12)
- Preceded by: None (post created)
- Succeeded by: Félix Fuchs

Governor-General of the Congo Free State
- In office 21 December 1900 – 15 November 1908
- Monarch: Leopold II
- Preceded by: Émile Wangermée (acting)
- Succeeded by: None (post abolished)
- In office 26 August 1892 – 4 September 1896
- Preceded by: Camille Janssen
- Succeeded by: Émile Wangermée (acting)

Personal details
- Born: 27 April 1844 Menen, Belgium
- Died: 26 January 1921 (aged 76) Brussels, Belgium

Lieutenant-General Baron Théophile Wahis (French pronunciation: [teofil wa.i]; 27 April 1844 – 26 January 1921) was a Belgian soldier and colonial civil servant who served as Governor-General of the Congo Free State and, subsequently, the Belgian Congo for two terms between 1891 and 1912. He was the longest ruling of Belgian colonial governors.

== Career ==
Théophile Wahis was born in Menen in West Flanders, Belgium, on 27 April 1844 to a military family. He entered the Belgian Army and studied at the Royal Military Academy in Brussels. During the Franco-Mexican War (1864–67), Wahis volunteered for service in the Belgian Legion sent to Mexico to fight alongside French and Imperial Mexican Forces. (Note: The Belgian Legion was not part of an official Belgian Army but a unit of volunteers sent to fight for Emperor Maximilian of Mexico whose wife, Charlotte, was the sister of the incumbent Belgian monarch Leopold II.) Wahis served with distinction in Mexico, returning to the Belgian military in 1867 but was frustrated by the lack of promotion. Through General Alfred van der Smissen, the former commander of the Belgian Legion in Mexico, Wahis was introduced to King Leopold II as a possible candidate for the King's private venture in the Congo Free State.

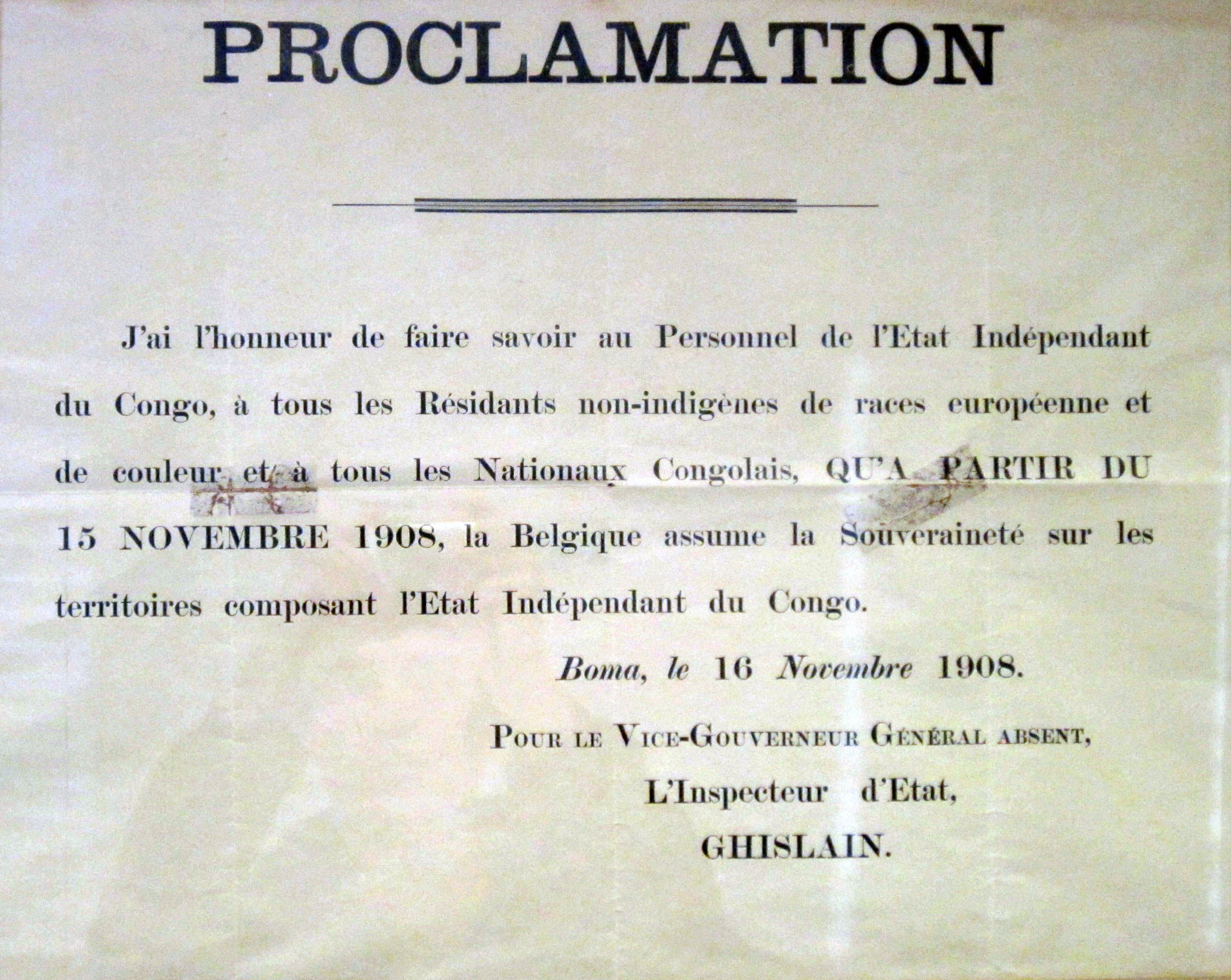
Poster proclaiming the Congo Free State's annexation by Belgium in November 1908

In 1890–91, Wahis was posted to Boma as a senior civil servant in the Free State administration. His success in the role led to rapid promotion and, in 1892, he was designated the state's next Governor General, replacing Camille Janssen. Wahis' military background had a strong influence on governance in the Free State and contributed to its increasingly harsh policies of rule. He clashed particularly with more liberal colonial figures, such as Félix Fuchs and Félicien Cattier, whose own backgrounds were as civilian lawyers. According to historians Lewis H. Gann and Peter Duignan, Wahis' appointment "symbolized the increasingly exploitative nature of the Free State's administration" and the growing "Belgianization" of the colony's administration.

Wahis was a strong defender of the Free State's public record in the international press. For his services to the state, he received the honorary rank of Lieutenant General and the title of Baron in 1901. After Belgium was forced by international pressure to annex the Free State in 1908, Wahis continued as Governor-General of the new Belgian Congo. He resigned in 1912 and was succeeded by Fuchs.

Retiring from colonial administration, Baron Wahis became a businessman with a position in a company in the Dutch East Indies and in the Congo's Compagnie du Katanga. He died in January 1921. A street in Brussels and a street in Menen are named after him.
