= List of colonial governors of the Congo Free State and Belgian Congo =

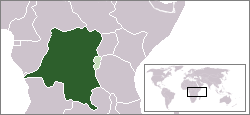
Belgian Congo (dark green) depicted with Belgian Ruanda-Urundi (light green), 1935.

This is a list of European colonial administrators responsible for the territory of the Congo Free State and Belgian Congo (today the Democratic Republic of the Congo).

== International Association of the Congo ==
Prior to the creation of the Congo Free State, the International Association of the Congo (IAC) had signed treaties with over 300 native Congolese chiefs and in effect exercised sovereignty over a large area of the Congo Basin. The IAC was headquartered in Belgium and run by a committee under the presidency of Maximilien Strauch. Prior to the creation of the office of Administrator-General, authority on the ground in the Congo had been exercised by a Chief of Expedition, who until April 1884 was Henry Morton Stanley.

Portrait	Name (Birth–Death)	Position	Term of office			Notes
Portrait	Name (Birth–Death)	Position	Took office	Left office	Time in office	Notes
	Francis de Winton (1835–1901)	Administrator-General	22 April 1884	1 July 1885	1 year, 70 days	

== Congo Free State ==
=== Administrators-General / Governors-General ===
Portrait	Name (Birth–Death)	Position	Term of office			Notes
Portrait	Name (Birth–Death)	Position	Took office	Left office	Time in office	Notes
	Francis de Winton (1835–1901)	Administrator-General	1 July 1885	April 1886	9 months	
	Camille Janssen (1837–1926)	Administrator-General	April 1886	17 April 1887	6 years, 3 months	
	Camille Janssen (1837–1926)	Governor-General	17 April 1887	1 July 1892	6 years, 3 months	
	Théophile Wahis (1844–1921)	Governor-General	1 July 1892	15 November 1908	16 years, 137 days	

=== Vice Governors-General ===
Portrait	Name (Birth–Death)	Position	Term of office			Notes
Portrait	Name (Birth–Death)	Position	Took office	Left office	Time in office	Notes
	Camille Janssen (1837–1926)	Vice Administrator-General	25 September 1885	April 1886	6 months	
	Herman Ledeganck (1841–1908)	Vice Governor-General	31 January 1888	January 1889	11 months	
	Henri Gondry (1845–1889)	Acting Vice Governor-General	January 1889	18 May 1889	4 months	
	Camille Coquilhat (1853–1891)	Vice Governor-General	1890	24 March 1891	0–1 years	
	Théophile Wahis (1844–1921)	Vice Governor-General	15 April 1891	1 July 1892	1 year, 77 days	
	Francis Dhanis (1861–1909)	Vice Governor-General	4 September 1896	1897	0–1 years	
	Émile Wangermée (1855–1924)	Vice Governor-General	11 April 1897	1 December 1897	234 days	
	Alphonse van Gèle (1848–1939)	Vice Governor-General	1 December 1897	10 January 1899	1 year, 40 days	
	Paul Costermans (1860–1905)	Vice Governor-General	January 1904	March 1905	1 year, 2 months	
	Félix Fuchs (1858–1928)	Governor-General ad interim	25 December 1902	4 March 1904	1 year, 70 days	
	Félix Fuchs (1858–1928)	Vice Governor-General	1907	1908	0–1 years	
	Albert Lantonnois van Rode (1852–1934)	Vice Governor-General	May 1905	1906/7	1–2 years	

== Belgian Congo ==
Portrait	Name (Birth–Death)	Position	Term of office			Notes
Portrait	Name (Birth–Death)	Position	Took office	Left office	Time in office	Notes
	Théophile Wahis (1844–1921)	Governor-General	15 November 1908	20 May 1912	3 years, 187 days	
	Félix Fuchs (1858–1928)	Governor-General	20 May 1912	5 January 1916	3 years, 230 days	
	Eugène Henry (1862–1930)	Governor-General	5 January 1916	30 January 1921	5 years, 25 days	
	Maurice Lippens (1875–1956)	Governor-General	30 January 1921	24 January 1923	1 year, 359 days	
	Martin Rutten (1876–1944)	Governor-General	24 January 1923	27 December 1927	4 years, 337 days	
	Auguste Tilkens (1869–1949)	Governor-General	27 December 1927	14 September 1934	6 years, 261 days	
	Pierre Ryckmans (1891–1959)	Governor-General	14 September 1934	31 December 1946	12 years, 108 days	
	Eugène Jungers (1888–1958)	Governor-General	31 December 1946	1 January 1952	5 years, 1 day	
	Léo Pétillon (1903–1996)	Governor-General	1 January 1952	12 July 1958	6 years, 192 days	
	Hendrik Cornelis (1910–1999)	Governor-General	12 July 1958	30 June 1960	1 year, 354 days	

On 1 July 1960, the Belgian Congo became independent as the Republic of the Congo (République du Congo).

== See also ==
- Colonization of the Congo Basin
- Belgian colonial empire
- Minister of the Colonies (Belgium)
- List of colonial governors of Ruanda-Urundi
- List of presidents of the Democratic Republic of the Congo
- List of prime ministers of the Democratic Republic of the Congo
