= Georges Mortehan =

Belgian colonial administrator

Resident of Rwanda
- In office 4 February 1919 – 5 May 1919
- Preceded by: Gérard François Declerck
- Succeeded by: Edouard Van den Eede

Resident of Rwanda
- In office 1920 – 28 November 1923
- Preceded by: Edouard Van den Eede
- Succeeded by: Oger Coubeau

Resident of Rwanda
- In office 1926 – 15 September 1928
- Preceded by: Oger Coubeau (then Keyser, acting Resident)
- Succeeded by: Oger Coubeau

Resident of Rwanda
- In office 14 April 1929 – 14 September 1929
- Preceded by: Oger Coubeau
- Succeeded by: H. Wilmin

Commissioner of Costermansville
- In office 30 October 1933 – 1935
- Succeeded by: Joseph Noirot

Personal details
- Born: 19 February 1883 Arlon, Belgium
- Died: 5 May 1955 (aged 72) Etterbeek, Belgium
- Occupation: Agronomist, administrator

Georges Mortehan (19 February 1883 – 5 May 1955) was a Belgian colonial administrator. He served as Resident of Rwanda for four terms between 1919 and 1929, and then as commissioner of Costermansville Province in the Belgian Congo from 1933 to 1935.

== Early years ==
Georges Marie Mortehan was born in Arlon on 19 February 1883, the son of Louis Edmond Mortehan and Marie Adélaïde Emma Hollenfeltz. He attended the Agronomic University of Gembloux and graduated as an agricultural engineer on 24 August 1907. His first jobs included chemist at the Zelzate sugar refinery, then supervisor of softwood plantation work round Arlon. He soon joined the service of the Congo Free State as a forest sub-controller, and left Belgium for the Congo on 13 August 1908 a few days before Parliament voted for annexation of the Congo to Belgium.

== Belgian Congo (1908–1916) ==
In the Congo Mortehan began an internship at the Eala Botanical Garden. He was assigned to the Bangalas agricultural post in the Lualaba District on 5 March 1909. He was appointed cultivation manager 2nd class in July 1910 and left on leave on 23 August 1911. He left for the Congo again on 21 January 1912, and on 17 February 1912 was made head of the Yambata station. He was promoted to cultivation manager 1st class on 1 January 1913.

On 9 March 1914 Mortehan became the manager of the Likini station. While at Yambata and Likini he collected a series of well-preserved herbaria, including some bryophytes and 1470 vascular plants. Émile De Wildeman dedicated several species of tropical flora to him, including Daniellia mortehanii. Mortehan went on leave on 17 September 1914, but since Belgium had been occupied by Germany early in World War I (1914–1914), he was unable to return home. He began his third tour on 28 April 1915, once again assigned to the Bangalas post. His health failed, and on 7 April 1916 he returned to Europe (probably England) to recover.

== Rwanda (1917–1929) ==
Mortehan left London on 20 December 1916 and traveled via Cape Town and Dar es Salaam to Usumbura, Burundi, which he reached on 26 February 1917. On 1 January 1917 he was promoted to provincial agronomist, and on 1 January 1918 to inspector of agriculture. Mortehan was one of the first Belgians to reach Rwanda after World War I (1914–1918). He arrived in 1919 and traveled throughout the country explaining agricultural techniques. He was interested in introducing new plants to serve an export market. He published his views in an article in the Bulletin Agricole du Congo Belge (1921).

Mortehan returned on leave to Europe on 27 January 1920. He left for his fifth tour on 17 December 1920, again travelling via London, Cape Town, Dar es Salaam to Usumbura. He became Resident of Rwanda in 1920. In 1920 the rinderpest disease, which had spread from Uganda, was killing 60% of the cattle who were infected. The resident Van den Eede launched a compulsory vaccination program, but resistance from the notables meant the program was a failure. Mortehan, who succeeded Van den Eede, was forced to cancel the program, a victory for the Rwandan court. He was appointed district commissioner 2nd class on 1 January 1923. He left Usumbura on 16 December 1923 and embarked for Belgium in Boma on 26 January 1924. He returned to Africa for the sixth time on 19 February 1925, again via London and Dar es Salaam, this time accompanied by his wife, to resume his duties in Usumbura which he reached on 26 March 1925.

Mortehan collaborated with Charles Voisin, vice governor of Rwanda-Urundi, on administrative reorganization until 1929. Monsignor Léon-Paul Classe, Vicar Apostolic to Rwanda, wrote to Mortehan on 21 September 1927 proposing that the Bahutu would prefer to be given orders by the Batutsi, who were natural chiefs, than by uncouth persons, presumably Bahutu. In 1928 Mortehan prevented the Hutu and Twa from playing any role in the administration. The "Mortehan Reform" instituted a revolutionary change to Rwandan institutions, society and culture. The ancient royal administrative units, the "chefferies" and "sous-chefferies", were institutionalized, but the chiefs of pastures and chiefs of the army were removed, as was the power of the king to select or dismiss his chiefs. Hutu, Twa and Tutsi were removed from power and replaced by Tutsi aristocrats. This was a contributing factor in the 1994 Genocide against the Tutsi.

Mortehan was named district commissioner 1st class on 1 January 1926. He returned on leave via Mombasa on 18 September 1928. He left Marseilles on 14 February 1929 for Mombasa, and reach Usumbara on 3 March 1929. In January 1929 Governor Alfred Marzorati was replaced by Louis Joseph Postiaux. Shortly after Mortehan was replaced by H. Wilmin. On 1 April 1930 he was appointed commissioner general and assistant to the governor of Ruanda-Urundi. On his eighth tour he left Marseilles on 2 October 1931 and again traveled via Marseille and Mombasa.

== Kivu (1933–1935) ==
On 30 October 1933 Mortehan was named provincial commissioner of Costermansville Province (Kivu). Mortehan was the first Commissioner of Costermansville Province (later Kivu Province) after it was formed from part of the old Orientale Province. He left Costermansville in 1935, succeeded by Joseph Noirot. On 15 September 1935 he was appointed State Inspector. He retired after thirty years of service on 13 April 1938.

Mortehan was involved with Unatra (the state-owned river transport company in the Congo), the Rwanda Urundi Tin Mines Company (MINETAIN) and the Kilo-Moto gold mining company. He was a member of the Cercle Royal Africain et de l'Outre-Mer. Mortehan died in Etterbeek, Belgium, on 5 May 1955.

== Sources ==
- "Congo (Kinshasa) Provinces", Rulers.org
- Des Forges, Alison (17 May 2011), Defeat Is the Only Bad News: Rwanda under Musinga, 1896–1931, Univ of Wisconsin Press, ISBN 978-0-299-28143-4
- D'Hoore, J.C. (16 March 1990), "MORTEHAN (Georges Marie)", Biographie Belge D'Outre-mer, vol. VIII, Academie Royale des Sciences D'Outre-mer
- Freedman, Sarah Warshauer; Weinstein, Harvey M.; Longman, Timothy (2006), The Teaching of History of Rwanda: A Participatory Approach (PDF), University of California
- Sellstrom, Tor; Wohlgemuth, Lennart (1996), The International Response to Conflict and Genocide: Lessons from the Rwanda Experience (PDF), The Nordic Africa Institute
