= Alfred Claeys-Boúúaert =

Alfred Claeys-Boúúaert may refer to:

- Alfred Claeys-Boúúaert (senator) (1844–1936), Belgian lawyer and politician
- Alfred Claeys-Boùùaert (colonial administrator) (1906–1993), Belgian lawyer, colonial administrator and diplomat
