= Rumanura famine =

1916–18 famine in Rwanda

Rumanura
- Country: Kingdom of Rwanda, Belgian-occupied German East Africa
- Period: 1916-1918
- Excess mortality: 110,000
- Causes: Requisition of labor, war, poor harvest
- Succeeded by: Rwakayihura famine (1928-29)

The Rumanura famine (Kinyarwanda: Rumanura, lit. 'exhausting one's resources') was a famine that occurred between 1916 and 1918 during the Belgian military occupation of Ruanda-Urundi in World War I.

== History ==
The German incorporation of the Kingdom of Rwanda into German East Africa became codified after an 1909 agreement to block Belgian expansion. During the East African Campaign in World War I, Germany levied a tax against the territory to combat the larger army. Both Belgians and Germans requisitioned labor and food from Western Rwanda to aid the wartime effort, creating shortages.

These shortages of labor, along with plundering from soldiers, created missed harvests and conditions for famine, which started in 1916. Troops razed arable lands and stole cattle from the Rwandan élite.

During this time, famine broke out and rapidly spread, aggravated by unbalanced rainfalls as well as by feudal coercion. Unlike other famines that had taken place since 1897, the Rumanura famine spread until it eventually covered the whole kingdom.

Limited famine relief effort was offered to Rwanda by the Belgian occupation, but was used as a pretext for the conscription of porters from Rwanda. Due to the fact that taxes had to be paid in food, the difference between the general population and the elites (mostly composed of Tutsi) was exacerbated.
