= List of colonial residents of Rwanda =

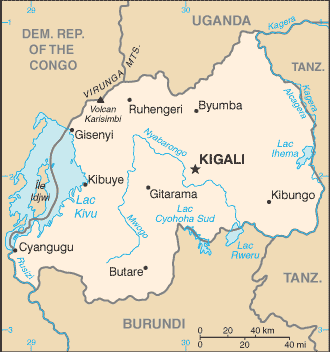
Map of Rwanda.

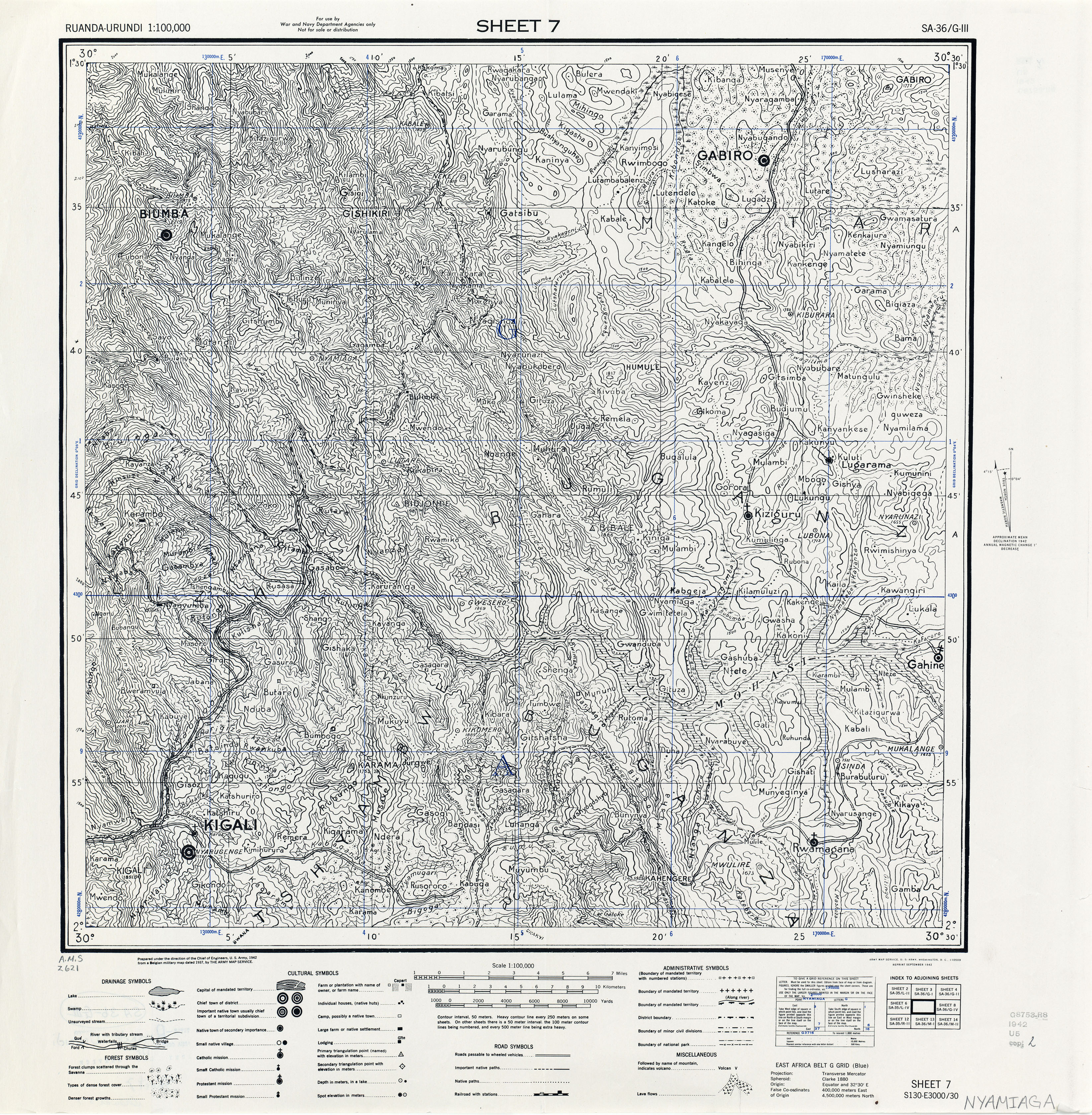
Map of Kigali (1942).

This article lists the colonial residents of Rwanda, during the time when modern-day Rwanda was part of German East Africa and Ruanda-Urundi.

== List ==
(Dates in italics indicate de facto continuation of office)

| Tenure | Portrait | Incumbent | Notes |
|---|---|---|---|
German suzerainty
| 1897 to 1907 | the Residents in Urundi | | |
| August 1907 to 1911 | | Richard Kandt, Resident | 1st term |
| 1911 to 1913 | | Eberhard Gudowius, acting Resident | |
| 1913 to 1914 | | Richard Kandt, Resident | 2nd term |
| 1914 to 17 May 1916 | | Max Wintgens, acting Resident | |
| 17 May 1916 to 17 June 1916 | | ... Scharpes, Resident | |
Belgian suzerainty
| 27 June 1916 to 30 April 1917 | | Gustave Eugène Henri Stevens, Military Resident | |
| 30 April 1917 to December 1918 | | Gérard François Declerck, Military Resident | |
| 4 February 1919 to 5 May 1919 | | Georges Mortehan, Resident | 1st term |
| 5 May 1919 to 1920 | | Edouard van den Eende, Resident | |
| 1920 to 28 November 1923 | | Georges Mortehan, Resident | 2nd term |
| 1924 to 18 February 1925 | | Oger Coubeau, Resident | 1st term |
| 1925 to 1926 | | ... Keyser, acting Resident | |
| 1926 to 15 September 1928 | | Georges Mortehan, Resident | 3rd term |
| September 1928 to 14 April 1929 | | Oger Coubeau, acting Resident | 2nd term |
| 14 April 1929 to 14 September 1929 | | Georges Mortehan, Resident | 4th term |
| 14 September 1929 to 8 January 1930 | | H. Wilmin, Resident | |
| 8 January 1930 to 18 December 1932 | | Oger Coubeau, Resident | 3rd term |
| 19 December 1932 to 1 March 1935 | | Maurice Simon, Resident | 1st term |
| 1 March 1935 to 1 October 1935 | | ... Hombart, Resident | |
| 1 October 1935 to 1 August 1938 | | Maurice Simon, Resident | 2nd term |
| 1 August 1938 to 24 January 1939 | | Albert Gille, Resident | |
| 24 January 1939 to 9 September 1940 | | Maurice Simon, Resident | 3rd term |
| 9 September 1940 to 15 April 1942 | | Jean Paradis, Resident | 1st term |
| 15 April 1942 to 1 July 1942 | | Léon Grauls, Resident | 1st term |
| 1 July 1942 to 21 September 1942 | | Maurice Simon, Resident | 4th term |
| 21 September 1942 to 15 April 1943 | | Léon Grauls, Resident | 2nd term |
| 15 April 1943 to 1 November 1943 | | Jean Paradis, Resident | 2nd term |
| 1 November 1943 to 1 December 1943 | | Léon Grauls, Resident | 3rd term |
| 1 December 1943 to 24 January 1944 | | Jean Paradis, Resident | 3rd term |
| 24 January 1944 to 27 February 1944 | | Léon Grauls, Resident | 4th term |
| 27 February 1944 to 31 March 1945 | | George Victor Sandrart, Resident | 1st term |
| 31 March 1945 to 4 August 1945 | | Léon Grauls, Resident | 5th term |
| 4 August 1945 to 19 March 1947 | | George Victor Sandrart, Resident | 2nd term |
| 19 March 1947 to 4 August 1947 | | Daniel Vauthier, Resident | |
| 4 August 1947 to 21 January 1948 | | Marcel Édouard Antoine Dessaint, Resident | 1st term |
| 28 January 1948 to 27 January 1951 | | George Victor Sandrart, Resident | 3rd term |
| 27 January 1951 to 1957 | | Marcel Édouard Antoine Dessaint, Resident | 2nd term |
| 1954 | | ... Bourgeois, acting Resident | Acting for Dessaint |
| 1957 to 11 November 1959 | | André Preud'homme, Resident | |
| 11 November 1959 to January 1962 | | Guillaume "Guy" Logiest, Special Military Resident | Appointed following the outbreak of the Rwandan Revolution |
| January 1962 to 1 July 1962 | | Guillaume "Guy" Logiest, High Representative | |
| 1 July 1962 | Independence as Republic of Rwanda | | |

== See also ==
- List of colonial governors of Ruanda-Urundi
- List of colonial residents of Burundi
