= Léo Pétillon =

Belgian colonial civil servant and lawyer

Minister of the Belgian Congo and Ruanda-Urundi
- In office 5 July 1958 – 6 November 1958
- Monarch: Baudouin
- Prime Minister: Gaston Eyskens
- Preceded by: Auguste Buisseret
- Succeeded by: Maurice Van Hemelrijck

Governor-General of the Belgian Congo
- In office 1 January 1952 – 12 July 1958
- Monarch: Baudouin
- Preceded by: Eugène Jungers
- Succeeded by: Hendrik Cornelis

Governor of Ruanda-Urundi
- In office 19 July 1949 – 1 January 1952
- Monarchs: Prince Charles (to 1950); Leopold III (1950–51); Baudouin (from 1951)
- Governor General: Eugène Jungers
- Preceded by: Maurice Simon
- Succeeded by: Alfred Claeys-Boúúaert

Personal details
- Born: Léon Antoine Marie Pétillon; 22 May 1903 Esneux, Province of Liège, Belgium
- Died: 1 April 1996 (aged 92) Ixelles, Brussels, Belgium

Léo Pétillon (22 May 1903 – 1 April 1996) was a Belgian colonial civil servant and lawyer who served as Governor-General of the Belgian Congo (1952–1958) and, briefly, as Minister of the Belgian Congo and Ruanda-Urundi (1958).

Pétillon studied Law and practiced as a lawyer, before entering the Belgian colonial service in 1929. He worked for several years at the Ministry of the Colonies in Brussels, serving as aide to a series of ministers. In 1939, he secured a posting to the Belgian Congo as aide to the Governor-General and spent most of World War II in the colony or with the Belgian government in exile in London. In 1946, Pétillon was promoted to Vice Governor-General, given responsibility for the Belgian mandate of Ruanda-Urundi. In 1952, he was promoted to the position of Governor-General himself, holding the position until 1958. After the end of his tenure, he briefly held a Ministerial position himself as technocrat in the government of Gaston Eyskens. He retired in 1959 and published several books. He died in 1996.

== Biography ==
Léon Antoine Marie Pétillon was born in Esneux in Belgium's Province of Liège on 22 May 1903 and studied Law at the Catholic University of Leuven, graduating with a doctorate. After practicing as a lawyer, Pétillon entered the colonial civil service in 1929, working at the Ministry of the Colonies in Brussels. After working on legal questions for the Ministry, Pétillon became chef de cabinet (aide) to the minister Paul Tschoffen and for his successors in the ministry, including Albert de Vleeschauwer. In this capacity he supervised the creation of the Colonial Lottery in 1934.

In February 1939, Pétillon asked to be posted to the Belgian Congo and received a position as chef de cabinet for the Governor-General, Pierre Ryckmans. He was still in the Congo in May 1940 when Belgium was invaded by Germany. Despite being posted as De Vleeschauwer's chef de cabinet with the Belgian government in exile in London, Pétillon spent most of World War II in the Congo. After the Liberation of Belgium in September 1944, Pétillon played a major role in re-establishing relations between the colonial administration in Africa and the Ministry of the Colonies.

In October 1946, he was promoted to Vice Governor-General as the deputy for the new Governor-General Eugène Jungers. Returning to Belgium in 1948, he helped to draw up the Ten-Year Plan (Plan décennal). He was posted to the Belgian United Nations Trust Territory of Ruanda-Urundi in July 1949 with overall responsibility for its administration. In January 1953, he replaced Jungers as Governor-General of the Belgian Congo, the senior administrative position in the Belgian colonies. As Governor-General, he received the visit of King Baudouin to the Congo in 1955 and worked on plans to create a "Belgian-Congolese Community" which would bring Belgians and Congolese into a more egalitarian relationship. His term also saw the first stirrings of anticolonial nationalism in the colony. In 1958, he was replaced by the Congo's final Governor-General, Hendrik Cornelis.

In 1958, Pétillon himself became Minister of the Belgian Congo and Ruanda-Urundi as a technocrat in the Christian Social Party minority government of Gaston Eyskens and started work on a project of colonial reform. He was the first individual to have personally presided over both colonial administrative and ministerial roles. In November, however, Eyskens brought the Liberals into the coalition and Maurice Van Hemelrijck replaced Pétillon as minister. He was retained in the ministry until the completion the report of the working group that he had created in December 1958.

Pétillon retired in 1959, working on a number of memoires in the following years. He was a member of the Royal Academy for Overseas Sciences.

== Publications ==
- Témoignage et réflexions (Brussels: La Renaissance du Livre, 1967).
- Courts métrages africains. Pour servir à l'histoire (Brussels: La Renaissance du Livre, 1979).
- Récit. Congo 1929–1958 (Brussels: La Renaissance du Livre, 1985).
