= Richard Kandt =

German writer and physician

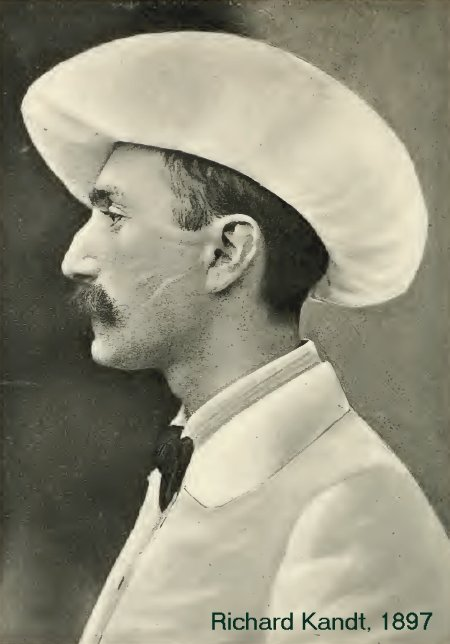
- Physician and explorer
- Born: 17 December 1867; Posen, Kingdom of Prussia (now Poznań, Poland)
- Died: 29 April 1918 (aged 50); Nuremberg, Germany

Richard Kandt (17 December 1867, in Posen – 29 April 1918, in Nuremberg; original name Kantorowicz) was a German physician and explorer of Africa.

== Life ==
Richard Kandt started as a psychiatrist in Bayreuth and Munich. Between 1897 and 1904 he explored the North-West of German East Africa and in 1907 was appointed as Resident of Rwanda, where he established Kigali as an administrative capital of Rwanda. His former house in Kigali is now a natural history museum.

Kandt's expedition 1897–1901

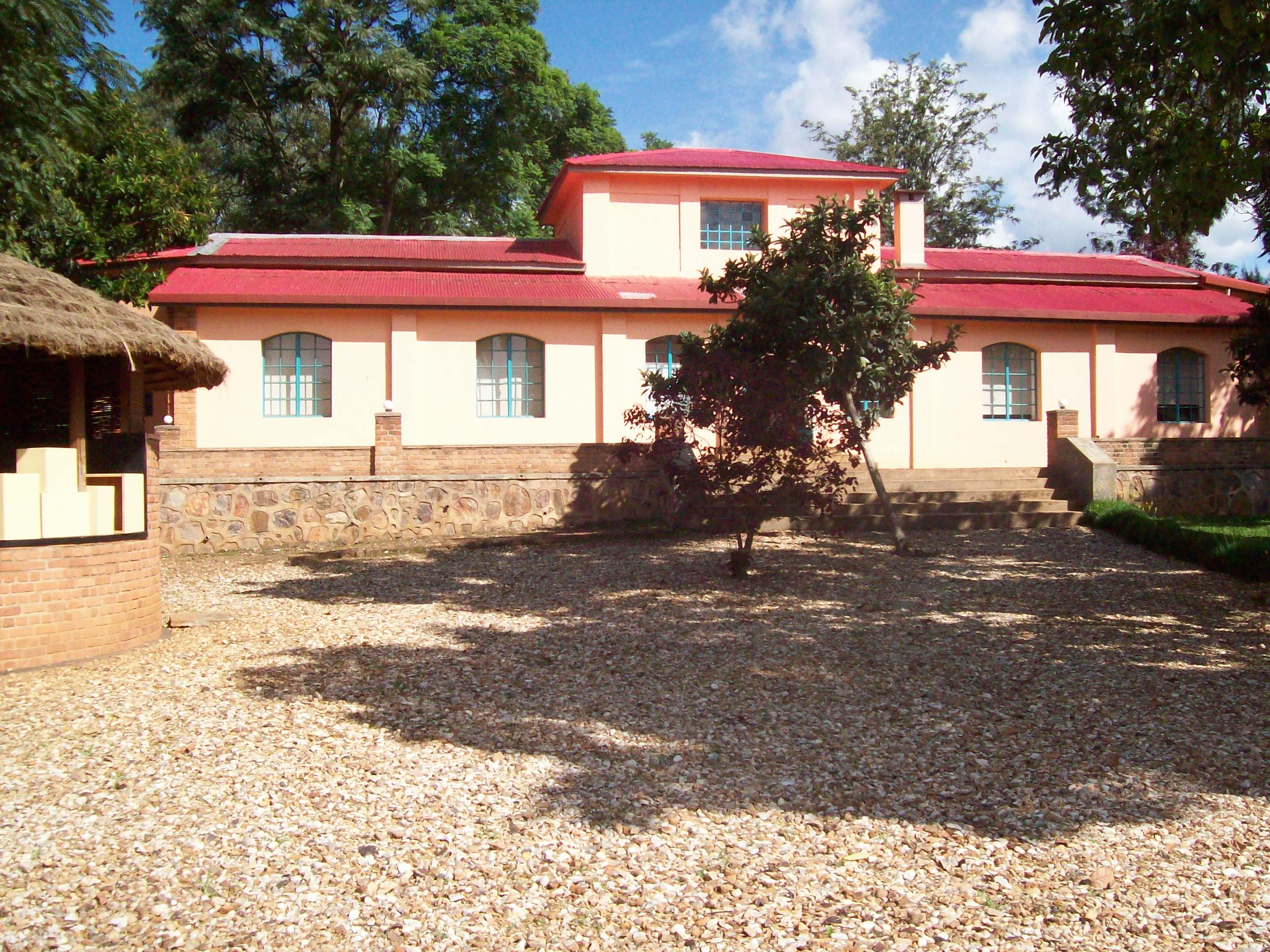
House of Kandt in Kigali

In July 1897 he started from Bagamoyo and in July 1898 Richard Kandt discovered one of the Nile-sources in the Nyungwe Forest of Rwanda, the essential Nile-source in his opinion. Kandt tells about this in his book Caput Nili, a deliberately more fancy than erudite work. In 1898, he discovered the source of the Kagera River. Between 1899 and 1901 he explored the Lake Kivu.

Since about 1900 he was a close friend with the writer Richard Voss.

On 2 July 1917 Kandt suffered a gas poisoning in World War I on the eastern front. Shortly after, he caught a miliary tuberculosis in Poland. He died 29 April 1918 in a military hospital in Nuremberg.

== Works ==
- Caput Nili – eine empfindsame Reise zu den Quellen des Nils. Dietrich Reimer Verlag Berlin, 1904, 6.ergänzte Auflage 1921
- Seele klingt. Dietrich Reimer Verlag, Berlin 1918. Poems, edited posthumously by Franz Stuhlmann.
