= Ruanda-Urundi =

1916–1962 Belgian territory in Africa

Coordinates: 2.7°S 29.9°E

Territory of Ruanda-Urundi Territoire du Ruanda-Urundi (French) Gebied van Ruanda-Urundi (Dutch)
- 1916–1962
- Flag

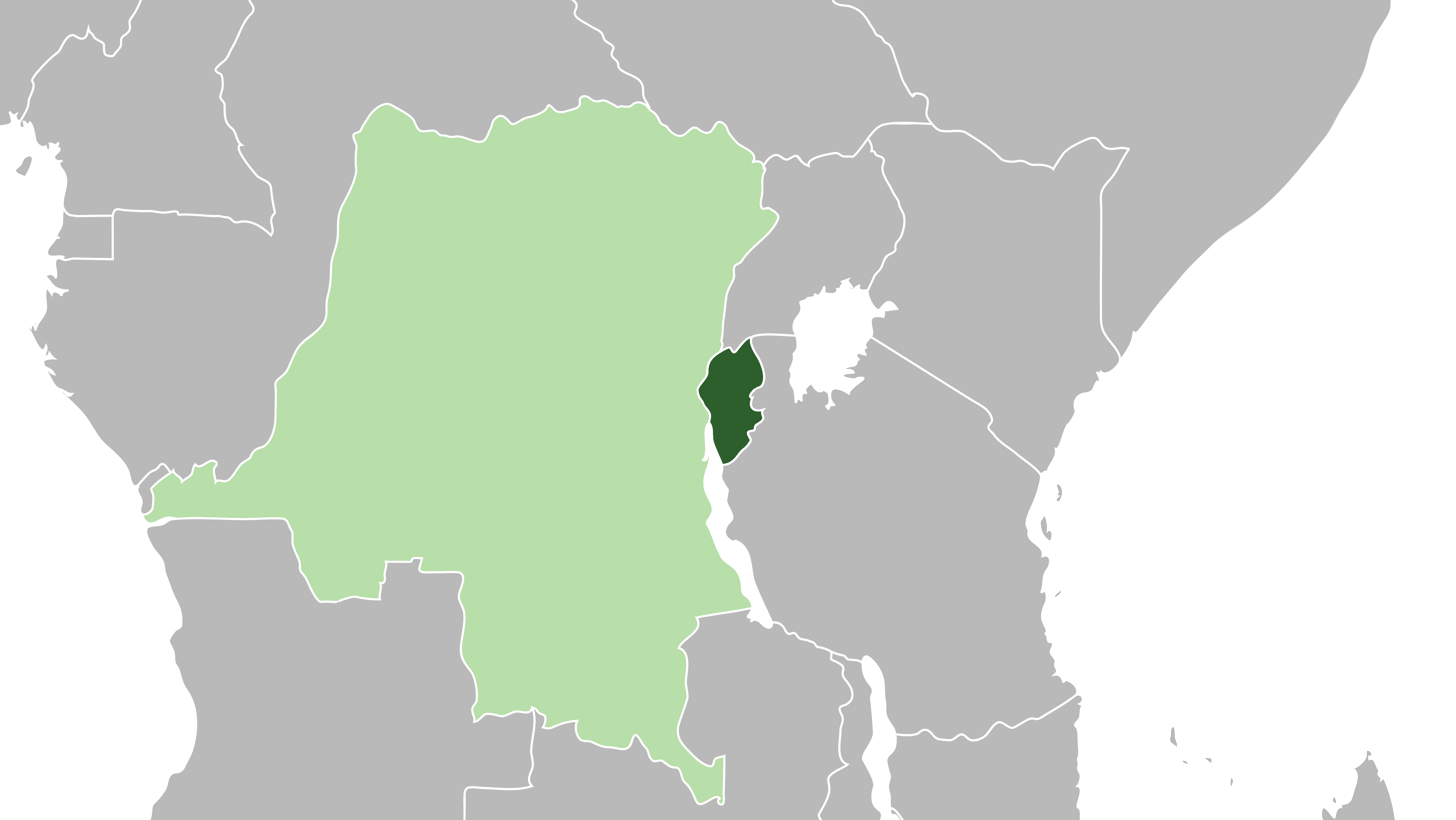
- Ruanda-Urundi (dark green) depicted within the Belgian colonial empire (light green), c. 1935
- Status: Occupied territory of Belgium (1916–1922); Class B League of Nations mandate of Belgium (1922–1946); United Nations trust territory under Belgian administration (1946–1960)
- Capital: Usumbura
- Common languages: French (official) also: Dutch. Majority: Kinyarwanda, Kirundi and Swahili
- Religion: Catholicism (de facto) also: Protestantism, Islam and others
- Administrator
  - 1916 (first): Charles Tombeur
  - 1960–1962 (last): Jean-Paul Harroy
- History
  - Belgian occupation: 6 May 1916
  - Mandate created: 20 July 1922
  - Administrative merger with Belgian Congo: 1 March 1926
  - Mandate becomes Trust Territory: 13 December 1946
  - Rwanda gains autonomy: 18 October 1960
  - Burundi gains autonomy: 21 December 1961
  - Independence of Rwanda and Burundi: 1 July 1962

Population
  - 1950 estimate: 4,300,000
- Currency: Belgian Congo franc (1916–60); Ruanda-Urundi franc (1960–62)
Preceded by	Succeeded by
German East Africa	Kingdom of Burundi; Republic of Rwanda
- Today part of: Burundi; Rwanda

Ruanda-Urundi (French pronunciation: [ʁwɑ̃da uʁundi]), (Note: Ruanda-Urundi is sometimes seen rendered phonetically into Dutch as Roeanda-Oeroendi. The name reflects the transcription of Swahili.) later Rwanda-Burundi, was a mandate and later trust territory ruled by Belgium between 1916 and 1962.

Once part of German East Africa, the region was occupied by troops from the Belgian Congo during the East African campaign in World War I. It was administered by Belgium under military occupation from 1916 to 1922. It was subsequently awarded to Belgium as a Class-B Mandate under the League of Nations in 1922 and became a Trust Territory of the United Nations in the aftermath of World War II and the dissolution of the League. In 1962, Ruanda-Urundi became the two independent states of Rwanda and Burundi.

== History ==
Ruanda and Urundi were two separate kingdoms in the Great Lakes region before the Scramble for Africa. In 1897, the German Empire established a presence in Rwanda with the formation of an alliance with the king, beginning the colonial era. They were administered as two districts of German East Africa. The two monarchies were retained as part of the German policy of indirect rule, with the Ruandan king (mwami) Yuhi V Musinga using German support to consolidate his control over subordinate chiefs in exchange for labour and resources.

=== Belgian military occupation, 1916–1922 ===
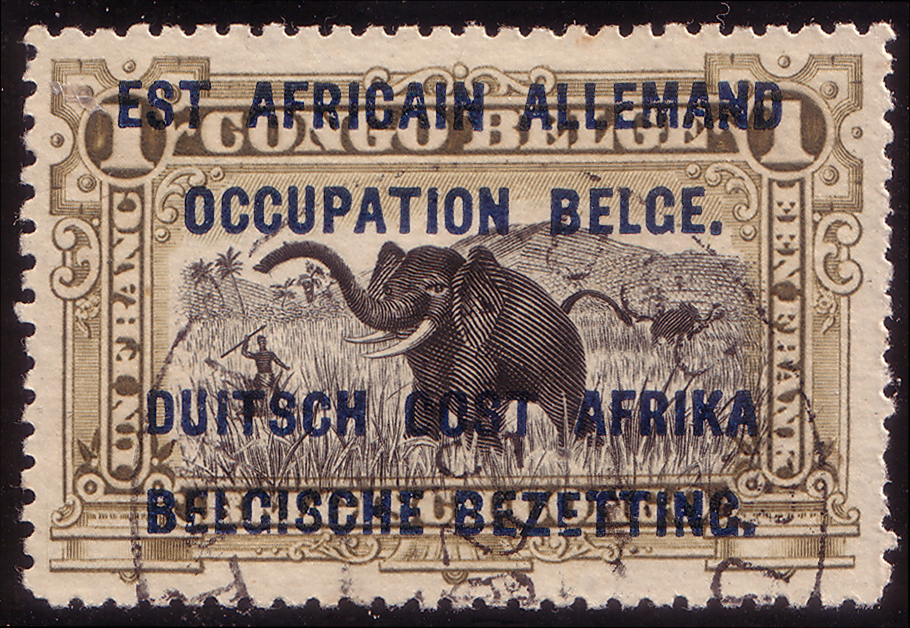
A Belgian Congo stamp overprinted for the Belgian Occupied East African Territories in 1916

When World War I broke out in 1914, German colonies were originally meant to preserve their neutrality as mandated in the Berlin Convention, but fighting soon broke out on the frontier between German East Africa and the Belgian Congo around Lakes Kivu and Tanganyika. As part of the Allied East African campaign, Ruanda and Urundi were invaded by a Belgian force in 1916. German forces in the region were small and hugely outnumbered. Ruanda was occupied over April–May and Urundi in June 1916. By September, a large portion of German East Africa was under Belgian occupation reaching as far south as Kigoma and Karema and as far eastwards as Tabora all in modern-day Tanzania.

In Ruanda and Urundi, the Belgians were welcomed by some civilians, who were opposed to the autocratic behaviour of the kings. In Urundi, much of the population fled or went into hiding, fearful of war. Much of the Swahili trader community which resided along the shores of Lake Tanganyika fled towards Kigoma, as they had long been commercial rivals with Belgian traders and feared retribution. The territory captured was administered by a Belgian military occupation authority ("Belgian Occupied East African Territories") pending an ultimate decision about its political future. An administration, headed by a Royal Commissioner, was established in February 1917 at the same time as Belgian forces were ordered to withdraw from the Tabora region by the British.

While the Germans had begun the practice of conscripting labour from the Ruandans and Urundians during the war, this was limited since the German administration considered sustaining a local labour force logistically challenging. The Belgian occupation force expanded labor conscription; 20,000 men were drafted to act as porters for the Mahenge offensive, and of these only one-third returned home. Many died due to malnourishment and disease. The new labour practices caused some locals to regret the departure of the Germans.

=== League of Nations mandate, 1922–1946 ===
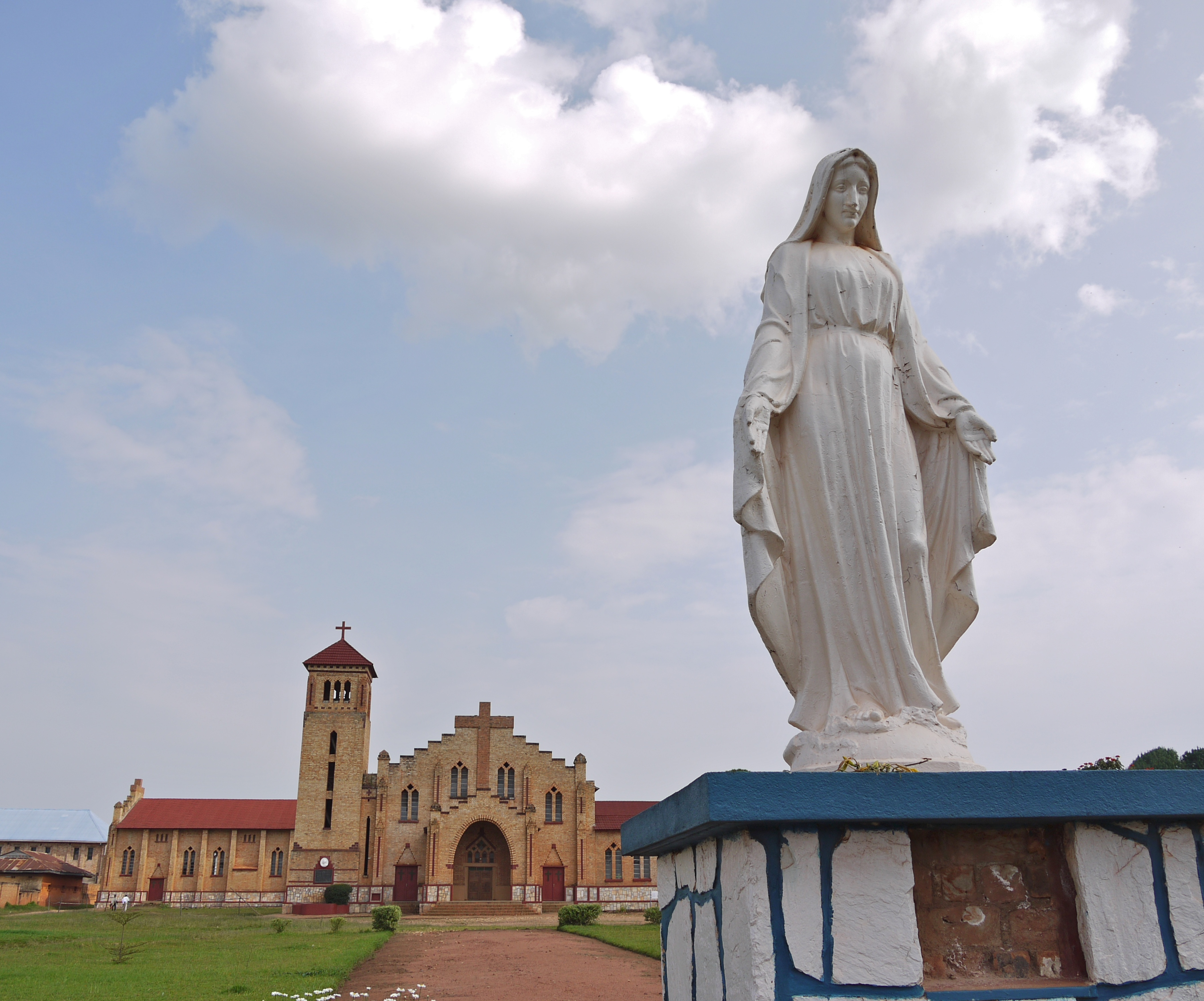
The Cathedral of Our Lady of Wisdom at Butare (formerly Astrida) in Ruanda. Catholicism expanded rapidly under the Belgian mandate.

The Treaty of Versailles in the aftermath of World War I divided the German colonial empire among the Allied nations. German East Africa was partitioned, with Tanganyika allocated to the British and a small area allocated to Portugal. Belgium was allocated Ruanda-Urundi even though this represented only a fraction of the territories already occupied by the Belgian forces in East Africa. Belgian diplomats had originally hoped that Belgian claims in the region could be traded for territory in Portuguese Angola to expand the Congo's access to the Atlantic Ocean. This proved impossible and the League of Nations officially awarded Ruanda-Urundi to Belgium as a B-Class Mandate on 20 July 1922. The mandatory regime was also controversial in Belgium and it was not approved by Belgium's parliament until 1924. Unlike colonies which belonged to its colonial power, a mandate was theoretically subject to international oversight through the League's Permanent Mandates Commission (PMC) in Geneva, Switzerland.

Administratively, the mandate was divided into two pays, Ruanda and Urundi, each under the nominal leadership of a Mwami as customary ruler. The city of Usumbura (modern-day Bujumbura) and its adjoining townships were classified separately as centres extra‑coutumiers, while the pays were subdivided into territories.

After a period of inertia, the Belgian administration became actively involved in Ruanda-Urundi between 1926 and 1931 under the governorship of Charles Voisin. The reforms produced a dense road-network and improved agriculture, with the emergence of cash crop farming in cotton and coffee. However, four major famines did ravage parts of the mandate after crop failures in 1916–1918, 1924–26, 1928–30 and 1943–44. The Belgians were far more involved in the territory than the Germans, especially in Ruanda. Despite the mandate rules that the Belgians had to develop the territories and prepare them for independence, the economic policy practised in the Belgian Congo was exported eastwards: the Belgians demanded that the territories earn profits for their country and that any development must come out of funds gathered in the territory. These funds mostly came from the extensive cultivation of coffee in the region's rich volcanic soils.

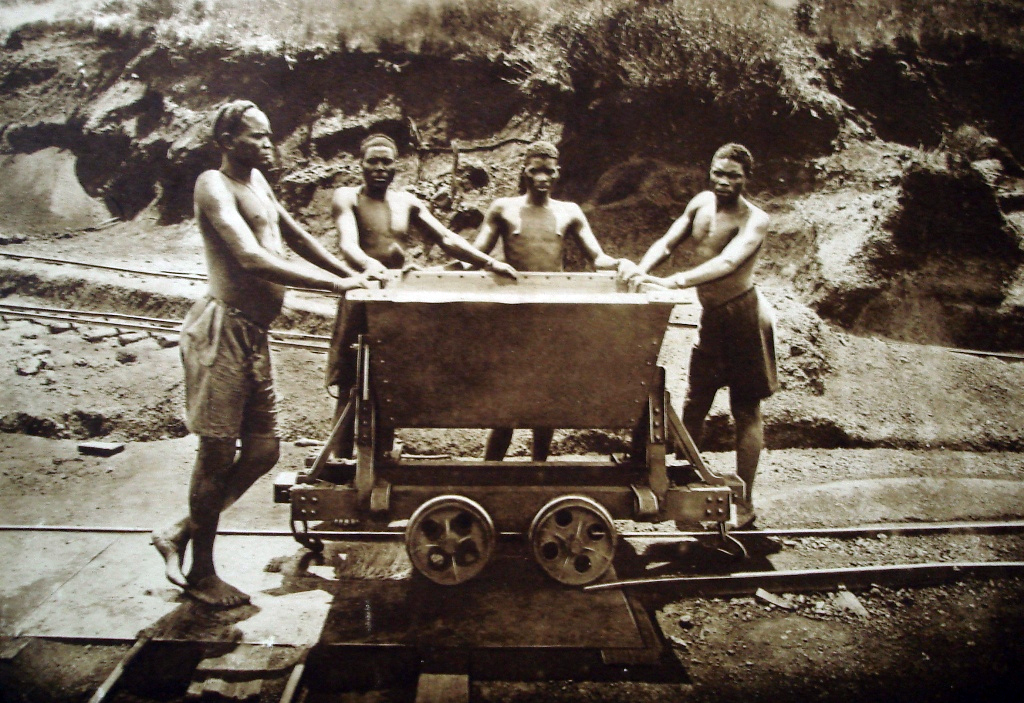
Ruandan labour migrants at the Kisanga copper mine in Katanga (Belgian Congo) in c. 1930

To implement their vision, the Belgians extended and consolidated a power structure based on indigenous institutions. In practice, they developed a Tutsi ruling class to formally control a mostly Hutu population, through the system of chiefs and sub-chiefs under the overall rule of the two Mwami. Belgian administrators were influenced by the so-called Hamitic hypothesis which suggested that the Tutsi were partially descended from a Semitic people and were therefore inherently superior to the Hutu who were seen as purely African. In this context, the Belgian administration preferred to rule through purely Tutsi authorities therefore further stratifying the society on ethnic lines. Hutu anger at the Tutsi domination was largely focused on the Tutsi elite rather than the distant colonial power. Musinga was deposed by the administration as mwami of Ruanda in November 1931 after being accused of disloyalty. He was replaced by his son Mutara III Rudahigwa.

Although promising the League it would promote education, Belgium left the task to subsidised Catholic missions and mostly unsubsidised Protestant missions. Catholicism expanded rapidly through the Rwandan population in consequence. An elite secondary school, the Groupe Scolaire d'Astrida, was established in 1929. As late as 1961, fewer than 100 people from Ruanda-Urundi had been educated beyond the secondary level.

=== United Nations trust territory, 1946–1962 ===
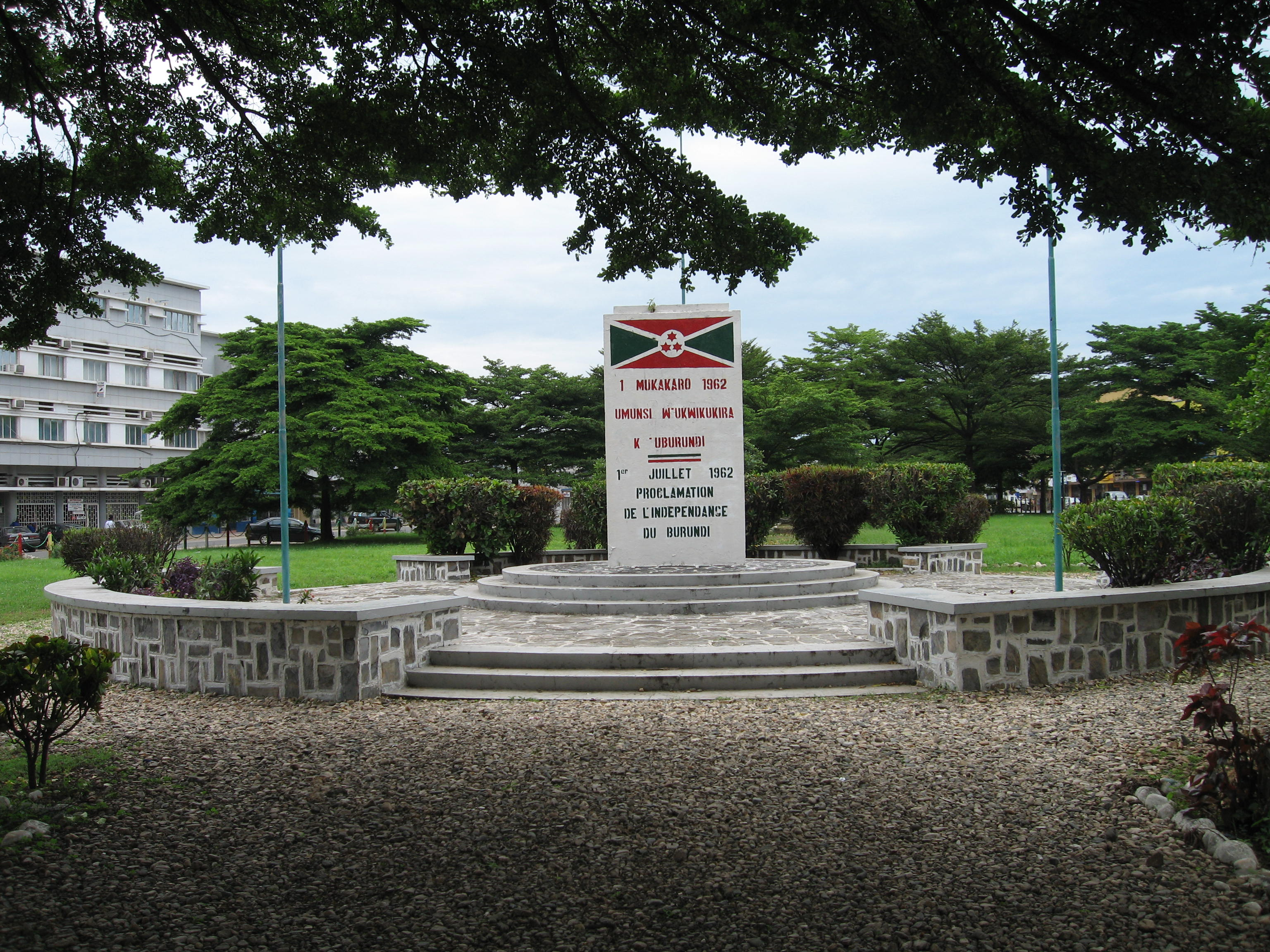
Monument in Bujumbura commemorating Burundi's independence on 1 July 1962

The League of Nations was formally dissolved in April 1946, following its failure to prevent World War II. It was succeeded, for practical purposes, by the new United Nations (UN). In December 1946, the new body voted to end the mandate over Ruanda-Urundi and replace it with the new status of "Trust Territory". To provide oversight, the PMC was superseded by the United Nations Trusteeship Council. The transition was accompanied by a promise that the Belgians would prepare the territory for independence, but the Belgians felt the area would take many decades to be ready for self-rule and wanted the process to take enough time before happening.

In 1961, the Belgian administration officially renamed Ruanda-Urundi as Rwanda-Burundi.

Independence came largely as a result of actions elsewhere. African anti-colonial nationalism emerged in the Belgian Congo in the late 1950s and the Belgian Government became convinced they could no longer control the territory. Unrest also broke out in Ruanda where the monarchy was deposed in the Rwandan Revolution (1959–1961). Grégoire Kayibanda led the dominant and ethnically defined Party of the Hutu Emancipation Movement (Parti du Mouvement de l'Emancipation Hutu, PARMEHUTU) in Rwanda, while the equivalent Union for National Progress (Union pour le Progrès national, UPRONA) in Burundi attempted to balance competing Hutu and Tutsi ethnic claims. The independence of the Belgian Congo in June 1960 and the accompanying period of political instability further drove nationalism in Ruanda-Urundi. The assassination of the UPRONA leader Louis Rwagasore (also Burundi's crown prince) in October 1961 did not halt this movement. After hurried preparations which included the dissolution of the monarchy in the Kingdom of Rwanda in September 1961, Ruanda-Urundi became independent on 1 July 1962, broken up along traditional lines as the independent Republic of Rwanda and Kingdom of Burundi. It took two more years before the government of the two became wholly separate and a further two years until the proclamation of the Republic of Burundi.

== Colonial governors ==
Ruanda-Urundi was initially administered by a Royal Commissioner (commissaire royal) until the administrative union with the Belgian Congo in 1926. After this, the mandate was administered by a Governor (gouverneur) located at Usumbura (modern-day Bujumbura) who also held the title of Vice-Governor-General (vice-gouverneur général) of the Belgian Congo. Ruanda and Urundi were each administered by a separate resident (résident) subordinate to the Governor.

Royal Commissioners (1916–1926)

- Justin Malfeyt (November 1916 – May 1919)
- Alfred Marzorati (May 1919 – August 1926)

Governors (1926–1962)

- Alfred Marzorati (August 1926 – February 1929)
- Louis Postiaux (February 1929 – July 1930)
- Charles Voisin (July 1930 – August 1932)
- Eugène Jungers (August 1932 – July 1946)
- Maurice Simon (July 1946 – August 1949)
- Léo Pétillon (August 1949 – January 1952)
- Alfred-Marie Claeys-Boùùaert (January 1952 – March 1955)
- Jean-Paul Harroy (March 1955 – January 1962)

For a list of residents, see: List of colonial residents of Rwanda and List of colonial residents of Burundi.

Kings (abami) of Ruanda

- Yuhi V Musinga (r. November 1896 – November 1931)
- Mutara III Rudahigwa (r. November 1931 – July 1959)
- Kigeli V Ndahindurwa (r. July 1959 – September 1961, when the Ruandan monarchy was abolished)

Kings (abami) of Urundi

- Mwambutsa IV Bangiricenge (r. December 1915 – July 1966)

== Maps ==
Territory of Ruanda-Urundi

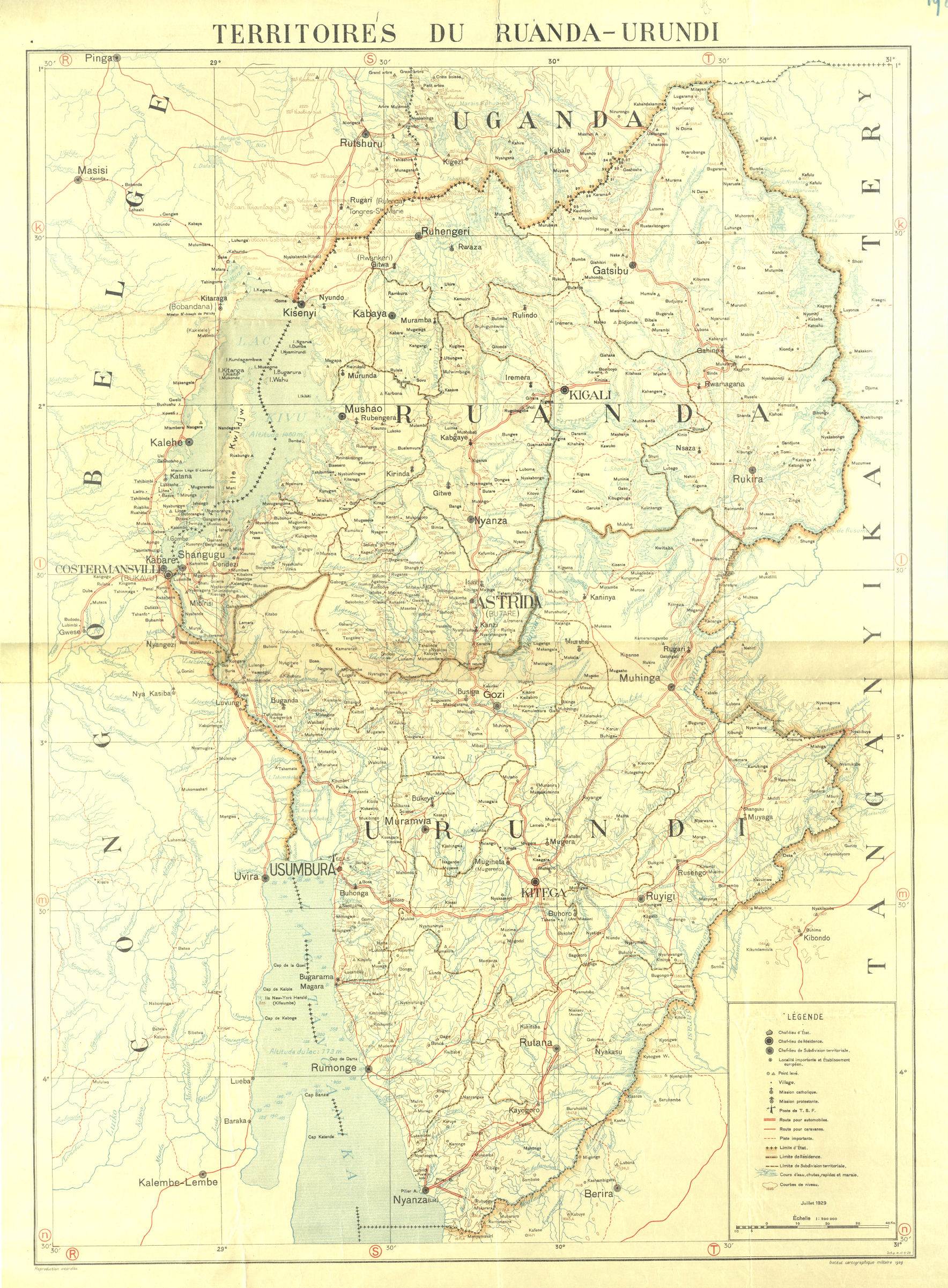
In 1929

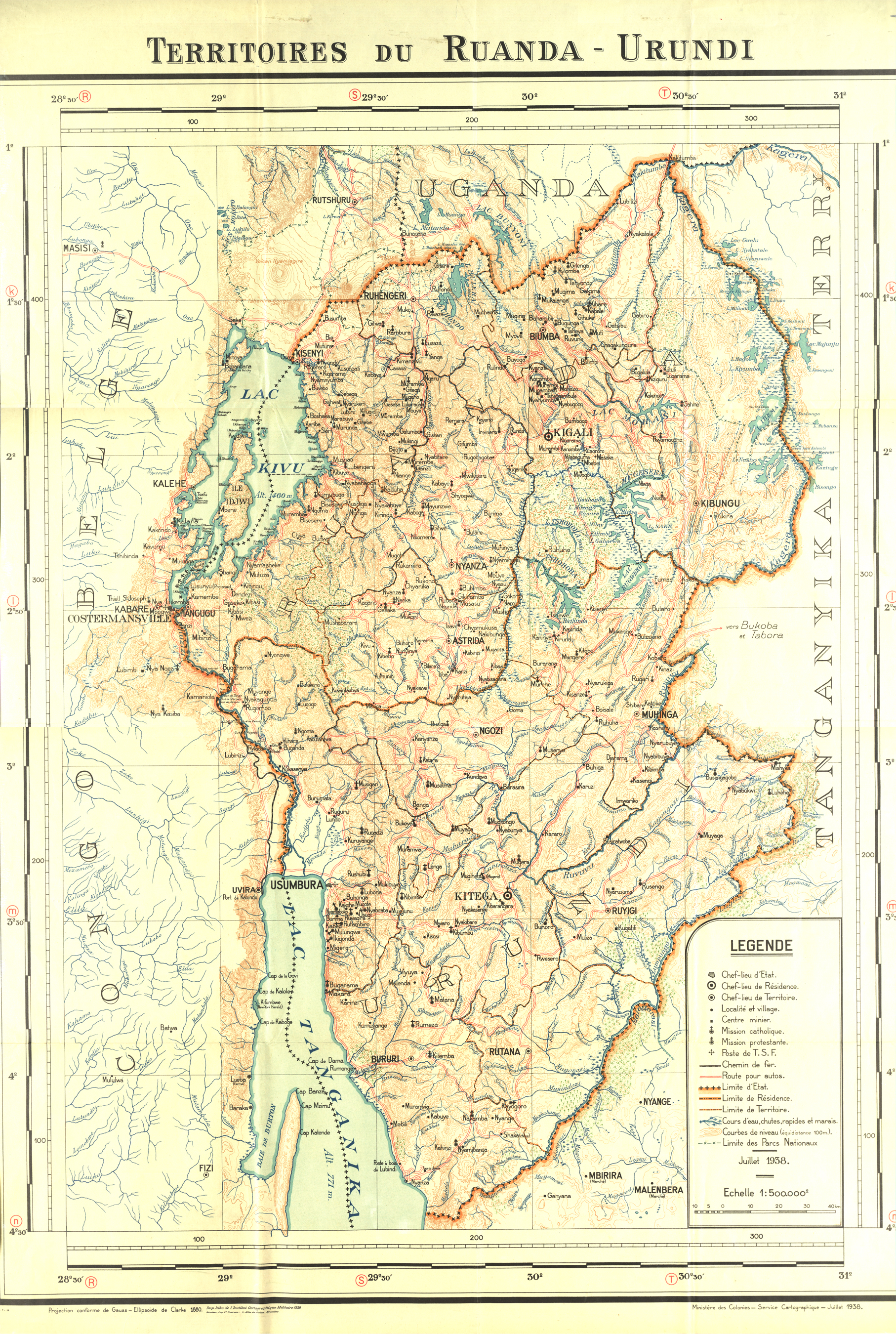
In 1938

== See also ==
- History of Burundi
- History of Rwanda
- East African Revival (1929–)
- Groupe Scolaire d'Astrida (founded 1929)
