= Charles Voisin (governor) =

Belgian lawyer and colonial administrator (1887–1942)

Attorney General of the Belgian Congo
- In office 9 November 1926 – 7 November 1929

Governor of Ruanda-Urundi
- In office 4 July 1930 – 18 August 1932
- Preceded by: Louis Postiaux
- Succeeded by: Eugène Jungers

Personal details
- Born: 29 October 1887 Flobecq, Hainaut, Belgium
- Died: 10 November 1942 (aged 55) Tournai, Hainaut, Belgium
- Occupation: Lawyer, colonial administrator

Charles-Henri-Joseph Voisin (29 October 1887 – 20 November 1942) was a Belgian lawyer and colonial administrator. He served as attorney general of the Belgian Congo, then as governor of the mandated territories of Ruanda-Urundi. He deposed the traditional king of Ruanda and replaced him by the king's son.

== Early years (1887–1909) ==
Charles-Henri-Joseph Voisin was born on 29 October 1887 in Flobecq, Hainaut, Belgium. His parents were Charles Voisin and Valérie-Palmyre-Joseph Venquier. Voisin studied law at the Catholic University of Louvain.

== Attorney in Belgian Congo (1910–1930) ==
Locations in the Congo

On graduating from university, Voisin entered the service of the Belgian Congo. He was appointed a provisional magistrate by ministerial decree on 31 January 1910, and on 3 March 1910 embarked in Antwerp for Boma in the lower Congo. On 26 March 1910 the attorney general at the court of appeal in Boma appointed Voisin substitute deputy of the public prosecutor at the court of first instance in Niangara in the Uele District. Voisin spent three statutory terms of service in Uele. From April 1910 to the end of September 1912 he was an alternate substitute (substitut suppléant). On 25 June 1913 he was made a titular substitute, and served in this role from the summer of 1913 to the start of 1916, and then from the summer of 1916 to July 1918. He served briefly in Kivu District at the start of his third term before returning to Niangara. He left on leave from Boma on 4 August 1918 and was vacationing in Le Havre when the armistice ended World War I (1914–1918).

Voisin returned to Boma on 8 March 1919 and was appointed King's Prosecutor at the court of first instance in Boma. He held this position for two terms, from 8 March 1919 to 29 May 1921, then from 30 November 1921 to 26 January 1924. On 22 July 1924 Voisin left Antwerp for Boma to take over management of the Public Prosecutor's Office. On 11 March 1925 he was appointed deputy prosecutor general at the Court of Appeal of Elisabethville in Katanga Province. In January 1926 he was appointed interim Attorney General in Katanga, holding this position until 11 December 1926. On 9 November 1926 he was appointed Attorney General to the Court of Appeal of Boma. Voisin left Boma on 21 April 1927 on leave, bound for Belgium, where he married Élisabeth Cornil. He embarked with his wife in Antwerp on 15 October 1927. He resumed his position as attorney general, which he held until 7 November 1929. During his period the attorney general's office was transferred from Boma to Léopoldville, the new capital of the Belgian Congo.

== Ruanda-Urundi (1930–1932) ==
After leave in Belgium, Voisin and his wife embarked at Antwerp on 21 May 1930. While en route they learned that he had been appointed by royal decree as vice-governor general of the Congo and governor of the mandate territories of Ruanda and Urundi, based in Usumbura. His statutory maximum term of 18 years of service expired during this period, but by ministerial decree he was able to extend it to 16 June 1932. He took over from Louis Postiaux, acting governor in place of Alfred Marzorati, who briefed him on the country's problems.

A series of reforms instituted between 1926 and 1932 came to be known as "les reformes Voisin", despite being started under Marzorati and Postiaux. The country had suffered a severe famine in 1928–1929. The administrative report for 1930 described its program to remedy the undernourishment of the natives, and periodic famines and food shortages. This required every capable adult native to cultivate and maintain a cassava plantation. Voisin initiated an economic recovery program in which road construction played a central role. The Europeans thought that Africans disliked work, and rarely did more than needed to meet their immediate or most basic needs. If they had to pay higher taxes, they might be induced to do more. Voisin's administration decided to abolish the system through which labour was given to the king, chiefs and deputy chiefs so as to free up labour for commercial agriculture. The unexpected result was to cause emigration to the British territories of Uganda and Tanganyika, aggravating the labor shortage. Voisin also tried to improve administrative control, improve livestock, reforest the land, prospect for mining opportunities and develop markets. He introduced cotton, coffee, palm, tobacco, cassava and sweet potatoes.

Voisin accepted the advice of The Catholic Bishop Léon Classe, and overhauled the chieftaincy structure. Before his reform each area had three chiefs, with a Hutu in charge of land and Tutsis in charge of cattle and army. After it, the three chiefdoms were combined and held by a Tutsi. The king of Ruanda, Musinga, was thought to be hostile to introduction of European civilization, had fought against the Belgians during World War I, had not accepted Christianity and had what the Belgians saw as scandalous sexual practices. When Voisin discussed the king with Classe, the bishop agreed that Musinga should be removed, since he had become increasingly hostile to the White Fathers and Christianity. One of his sons, Rudahigwa, had been educated by Europeans and could perhaps be converted to Christianity. On 14 November 1931 Voisin travelled from Usumbura to Nyanza with a company of government troops on bicycles. He summoned Musinga and informed him of his dismissal and replacement by his son Rudahigwa. By tradition the new king would have been enthroned by the abiru ritualists, but the Belgian authorities took charge of the ceremony. Voisin declared, "Rudahigwa, as you were nominated by the king of the Belgians, I proclaim you King of Ruanda. The Catholic Bishop Léon Classe then stated, "the title of your reign is Mutara by the requirement of the dynastic rule." Rudahigwa and many other Tutsi notables converted to Christianity soon after.

== Later career (1932–1942) ==
Voisin was succeeded in 1932 by Eugène Jungers. On return to Belgium, Voisin settled in Tournai, Hainaut. He was appointed a member of the Colonial Council. He died in Tournai after a painful illness on 20 November 1942, during the German occupation in World War II (1939–1945).

== Sources ==
- Collins, Barrie (2014), Rwanda 1994: The Myth of the Akazu Genocide Conspiracy and its Consequences, Palgrave Macmillan UK, ISBN 978-1-137-02232-5
- Cornet, Anne (2009), "Punir l'indigène : les infractions spéciales au Ruanda-Urundi (1930–1948)", Afrique & histoire (in French), 7 (1): 49–73, doi:10.3917/afhi.007.0049
- Des Forges, Alison (2011), Defeat Is the Only Bad News: Rwanda under Musinga, 1896–1931, Univ of Wisconsin Press, ISBN 978-0-299-28143-4
- Fink, Jason Benjamin (2005), "Deontological Retributivism and the Legal Practice of International Jurisprudence: The Case of the International Criminal Tribunal for Rwanda", Journal of African Law, 49 (2), School of Oriental and African Studies: 101–131, doi:10.1017/S0021855305000100, JSTOR 27607943, S2CID 143580930
- Gatwa, Tharcisse (2008), The Churches and Ethnic Ideology in the Rwandan Crises 1900–1994, Wipf & Stock Publishers, ISBN 978-1-59752-823-8
- Jadot, J.-M. (1958), "Voisin (Charles-Henri-Joseph)" (PDF), Biographie Belge d'Outre-Mer (in French), vol. V, Académie Royale des Sciences d'Outre-Mer, pp. col. 869–873
- Nzabimana, Tharcisse (1993), "Le Controle De La Main-d'oeuvre Au Burundi (Fin XIXe Siecle Environ 1930)", Civilisations (in French), 41 (1/2), Institut de Sociologie de l'Université de Bruxelles: 307–327, doi:10.4000/civilisations.1715, JSTOR 41229836
- Twagilimana, Aimable (2015), Historical Dictionary of Rwanda, Rowman & Littlefield Publishers, ISBN 978-1-4422-5591-3
