= Eugène Jungers =

Belgian colonial civil servant and lawyer

Governor-General of the Belgian Congo
- In office 31 December 1946 – 1 January 1952
- Monarchs: Leopold III (1946–51); Baudouin (1951–52)
- Preceded by: Pierre Ryckmans
- Succeeded by: Léon Pétillon

Vice Governor-General Governor of Ruanda-Urundi
- In office 18 August 1932 – 5 July 1946
- Monarchs: Albert I (1932–34); Leopold III (1934–46)
- Governors General: Auguste Tilkens; Pierre Ryckmans
- Preceded by: Charles Voisin
- Succeeded by: Maurice Simon

Personal details
- Born: Eugène Jacques Pierre Louis Jungers; 19 July 1888 Messancy, Belgium
- Died: 17 September 1958 (aged 70) Brussels, Belgium

Eugène Jungers (1888–1958) was a Belgian colonial civil servant and lawyer. Beginning his career in the Belgian Congo as a colonial magistrate, Jungers rose rapidly through the judiciary and became the colonial governor of the League of Nations Mandate of Ruanda-Urundi from 1932 to 1946. In 1946, Jungers was further promoted to Governor-General of the Belgian Congo, the senior administrative position in the colony, which he held from 1946 to 1952.

== Early life ==
Jungers was born in Messancy, a small Belgian town on the border with Luxembourg, on 19 July 1888 to a family of Luxembourgish ancestry. He studied at the University of Liège, graduating with a doctorate in Law in 1910.

Joining the Belgian colonial service, Jungers arrived in the Belgian Congo in 1911 where he took up a position as junior magistrate. Posted around the colony, he quickly rose through the ranks of the colonial judiciary. In 1924, he was made resident of Ruanda. In 1932, he was promoted to the rank of Vice Governor-General and was given responsibility for the Belgian League of Nations mandate of Ruanda-Urundi (modern-day Rwanda and Burundi), replacing Charles Voisin. He held the position until 1946; a tenure which included World War II and the Ruzagayura famine of 1943–44.

In 1946, Jungers was promoted as the replacement for Pierre Ryckmans as Governor-General of the Belgian Congo, the most important administrative position in the colony. He held the position until 1952 after which he took a board position at the Office des transports coloniaux (OTRACO). He received a noble title in 1956 and died in Brussels in 1958.
