= List of colonial governors of Ruanda-Urundi =

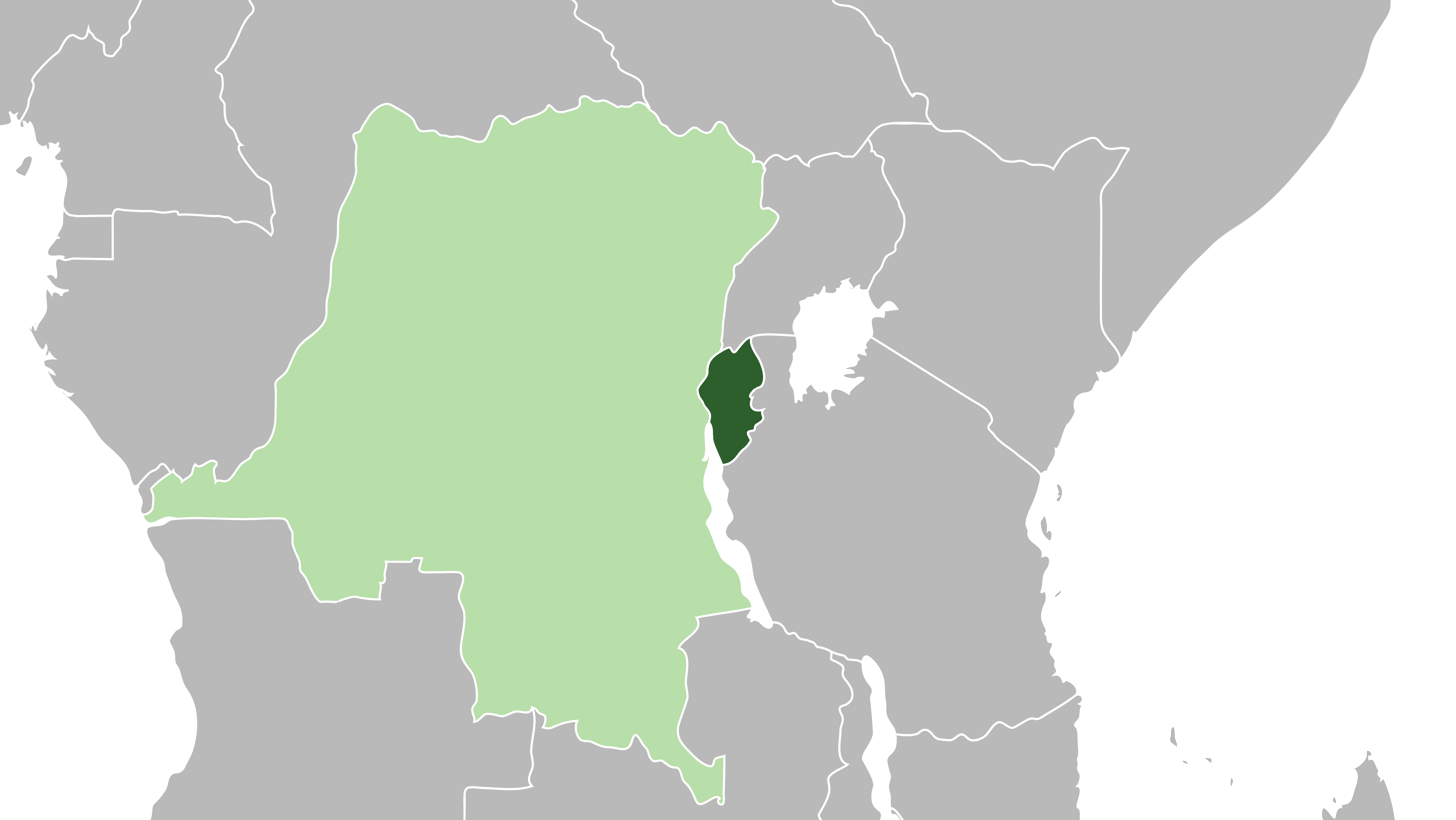
Ruanda-Urundi (dark green) depicted within the Belgian colonial empire (light green), 1935.

This is a list of European colonial administrators responsible for the territory of Ruanda-Urundi, an area equivalent to modern-day Rwanda and Burundi. Ruanda-Urundi formed part of German East Africa until it was captured by Belgian forces during World War I. After that, the territory became a Class B League of Nations mandate, and later a United Nations trust territory, under the administration of Belgium, until 1962 when the constituent parts of the territory became independent.

== German rule ==
=== Military District of Ujiji ===
Portrait	Name (Birth–Death)	Position	Term of office			Notes
Portrait	Name (Birth–Death)	Position	Took office	Left office	Time in office	Notes
	Hans von Ramsay (1862–1938)	Commander	May 1896	189?		
	Heinrich Bethe	Commander	1898	February 1901	2–3 years	

=== Military District of Usumbura ===
Portrait	Name (Birth–Death)	Position	Term of office			Notes
Portrait	Name (Birth–Death)	Position	Took office	Left office	Time in office	Notes
	Heinrich Bethe	Commander	1899	1902	2–3 years	
	Friedrich Robert von Beringe (1865–1940)	Commander	August 1902	February 1904	1 year, 6 months	
	Werner von Grawert (1867–1918)	Commander	February 1904	June 1906	2 years, 4 months	

=== Military Residency of Urundi and Ruanda ===
Portrait	Name (Birth–Death)	Position	Term of office			Notes
Portrait	Name (Birth–Death)	Position	Took office	Left office	Time in office	Notes
	Werner von Grawert (1867–1918)	Military Resident	1906	15 November 1907	0–1 years	

On 15 November 1907, the Military Residency of Urundi and Ruanda was divided into two civil residencies: Ruanda and Urundi.

== Belgian rule ==
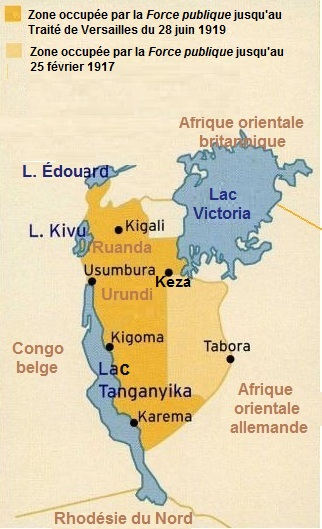
Map of occupation zones of the Force Publique in German East Africa between 19 September 1916 and 28 June 1919.

=== Territories south of Lake Victoria (including Northern Ruanda) ===
Portrait	Name (Birth–Death)	Position	Term of office			Notes
Portrait	Name (Birth–Death)	Position	Took office	Left office	Time in office	Notes
	Philippe Molitor (1869–1952)	Commander of the Northern Brigade	April 1916	1916	0 years	
	Armand Huyghé (1871–1944)	Commander of the Northern Brigade	1916	1917	0–1 years	

=== Territories east of Lake Kivu and Lake Tanganyika (including Southern Ruanda and Urundi) ===
Portrait	Name (Birth–Death)	Position	Term of office			Notes
Portrait	Name (Birth–Death)	Position	Took office	Left office	Time in office	Notes
	Frederik-Valdemar Olsen (1877–1962)	Commander of the Southern Brigade	May 1916	1917	0–1 years	

=== Occupied East African territories ===
Portrait	Name (Birth–Death)	Position	Term of office			Notes
Portrait	Name (Birth–Death)	Position	Took office	Left office	Time in office	Notes
	Charles Tombeur (1867–1947)	Military Governor	April 1916	22 November 1916	7 months	
	Justin Malfeyt (1862–1924)	Royal Commissioner	22 November 1916	May 1919	2 years, 5 months	
	Alfred Marzorati (1881–1955)	Royal Commissioner	May 1919	20 October 1924	5 years, 5 months	
	Pierre Ryckmans (1891–1959)	Acting Royal Commissioner	November 1921	July 1922	8 months	(Note: Acting for Marzorati.)

=== Ruanda-Urundi mandate / trust territory ===
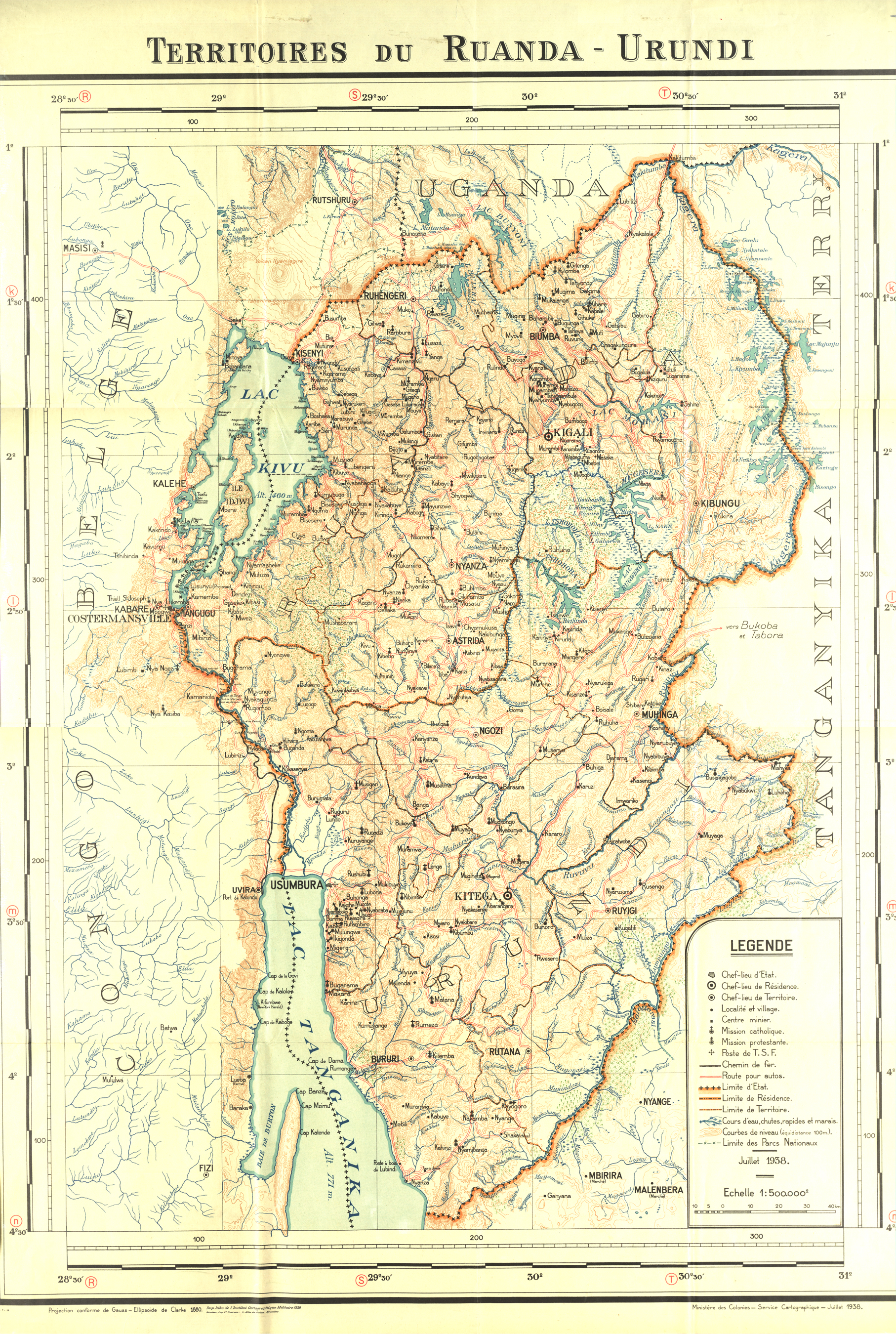
Map of Ruanda-Urundi.

Portrait	Name (Birth–Death)	Position	Term of office			Notes
Portrait	Name (Birth–Death)	Position	Took office	Left office	Time in office	Notes
	Alfred Marzorati (1881–1955)	Royal Commissioner	20 October 1924	28 August 1926	1 year, 312 days	(Note: 1st term; on 1 March 1926, Ruanda-Urundi was administratively united with Belgian Congo.)
	Pierre Ryckmans (1891–1959)	Acting Royal Commissioner	15 November 1925	13 December 1926	1 year, 28 days	(Note: Acting for Marzorati to 28 August 1926.)
	Alfred Marzorati (1881–1955)	Governor and Deputy Governor-General of the Belgian Congo	28 August 1926	5 February 1929	2 years, 161 days	(Note: 2nd term.)
	Louis Postiaux (1882–1948)	Acting Governor and Deputy Governor-General of the Belgian Congo	5 February 1929	4 July 1930	1 year, 149 days	
	Charles Voisin (1887–1942)	Governor and Deputy Governor-General of the Belgian Congo	4 July 1930	18 August 1932	2 years, 45 days	
	Eugène Jungers (1888–1958)	Governor and Deputy Governor-General of the Belgian Congo	18 August 1932	5 July 1946	13 years, 321 days	
	Maurice Simon (1892–1960)	Governor and Deputy Governor-General of the Belgian Congo	5 July 1946	August 1949	3 years	(Note: Acting to 1947.)
	Léo Pétillon (1903–1996)	Governor and Deputy Governor-General of the Belgian Congo	August 1949	1 January 1952	2 years, 5 months	
	Alfred Claeys-Boùùaert (1906–1993)	Governor and Deputy Governor-General of the Belgian Congo	1 January 1952	1 March 1955	3 years, 59 days	
	Jean-Paul Harroy (1909–1995)	Governor and Deputy Governor-General of the Belgian Congo	1 March 1955	1960	7 years, 122 days	
	Jean-Paul Harroy (1909–1995)	Resident-General	1960	1 July 1962	7 years, 122 days	

On 1 July 1962, the constituent parts of Ruanda-Urundi became independent as the Republic of Rwanda (République du Rwanda) and the Kingdom of Burundi (Royaume du Burundi), respectively.

== See also ==
- Minister of the Colonies (Belgium)
- List of colonial governors of the Congo Free State and Belgian Congo
- List of kings of Rwanda
- List of presidents of Rwanda
- List of kings of Burundi
- List of presidents of Burundi
