= Alfred Claeys-Boúúaert (senator) =

Belgian lawyer and politician (1844–1936)

Alfred Louis Fernand Ghislain Claeys-Boúúaert

Senator for East Flanders
- In office 1894–1921

Personal details
- Born: 16 May 1844 Ghent, East Flanders, Belgium
- Died: 4 March 1936 (aged 91) Ghent, East Flanders, Belgium
- Occupation: Lawyer, politician

Alfred Louis Fernand Ghislain Claeys-Boúúaert (16 May 1844 – 4 March 1936) was a Belgian lawyer and politician. He was a senator from 1894 to 1921.

== Early years ==
Alfred Louis Fernand Ghislain Claeys was born in Ghent, Belgium, on 16 May 1844. His parents were Ferdinandus Desidèrius-Léo Claeys and Mathilde-MariaJoanna-Gislena Boûûaert. He studied Classics at Sainte-Barbe College in Ghent and Notre-Dame de la Paix College in Namur, then studied Law at Ghent University. He graduated with a doctorate in Law in 1866. Alfred married Céline De Bruyn (1846–1928) and they had five children.

== Lawyer ==
Claeys-Boúúaert had a distinguished career as a lawyer, became a member of the legal council in 1882 and secretary of the council in 1882 He became president in 1892. In 1896 he was elected vice-president of the National Federation of Lawyers. Due to the pending extinction of the Boùùaert family (also written Boúúaert), Alfred and his brother Gustave (1842–1921) changed their surnames to Claeys-Boúúaert in 1888.

== Senator ==
In Ghent Claeys-Boúúaert played an active role within the Catholic party. In 1894 he was named a senator by the provincial council of East Flanders, where he held office until 1921. He helped draft the law on rehabilitation in penal matters of 25 April 1896, and the law protecting the pensions of provincial and municipal civil servants from seizure of 20 June 1896.

Claeys-Boúúaert was involved in debates related to the colonial enterprises of King Leopold II. On 28 June 1895 he refrained from voting on a law to grant loans to the Congo Free State and the Compagnie du chemin de fer du Congo on the grounds that Belgium was not yet well informed about what was happening in the Congo. In 1906 he was part of the Commission des XVII and signed a favorable report by this commission on the colonial charter. He was a director of the Compagnie du Lubilash, which carried out mainly agricultural activities in Kamina Territory.

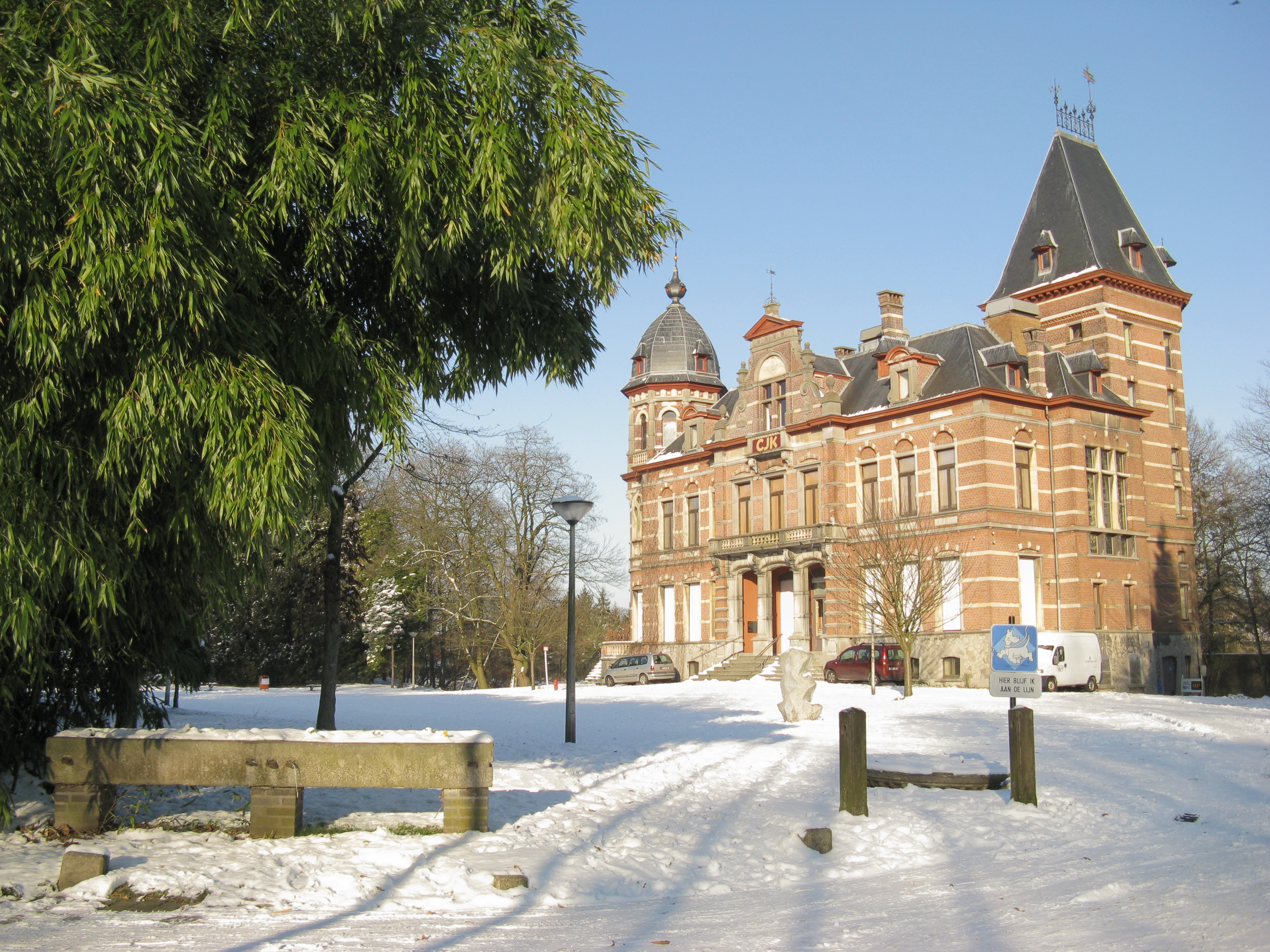
Kasteel Claeys-Bouüaert

Claeys-Boúúaert bought the château that Joseph Schadde had designed for Edmond Bracq in Mariakerke, East Flanders on the outskirts of Ghent, and also bought the surrounding land, while the château was still under construction. He completed construction in 1890–1892.

== Death and legacy ==
Claeys-Boúúaert died in Ghent on 4 March 1936. He was an officer of the Order of Leopold II and commander of the Order of Saint Alexander (Bulgaria). The church in Mariakerke has a monument to Alfred Claeys Bouuaert on its outside wall, and excellent neo-gothic funerary monument. His grandson Alfred-Marie Claeys-Boùùaert (1906-1993) later became governor of the Mandate Territories Ruanda-Urundi. The Kasteel Claeys-Bouüaert , with more than 100 rooms, remained in the family until it was sold to the Mariakerke municipality in 1971.

== Sources ==
- Buermans, Jacques (July 2014), "Mariakerke, An Hernalsteen oog in oog met bisschop Bracq WBP en ons aller An in prima vorm", Grafzerkje.be (in Dutch)
- Coosemans, M. (1955), "CLAEYS-BOÛÛAERT (Alfred-Louis-Ferdinand)", Biographie Belge d'Outre-Mer (in French), vol. IV, Académie Royale des Sciences d'Outre-Mer, pp. col. 128–129
- Corsino Alarza, Abel (12 March 2014), "El CJK del Parque Claeys-Bouüaert", Erasmus en Fandes (in Spanish)
- "Kasteel Claeys-Bouüaert", Begische burchten en kastelen (in Dutch)
- "Kasteeldomein van Mariakerke", Invenaris (in Dutch)
- Stockmans, Charles, "Gouverneurs du Ruanda-Urundi", Congo Belge et Ruanda-Urundi (in French), archived from the original on 2021-02-03
- Vermeulen, U. (1966), "Alfred Claeys-Boùùaert", Nationaal Biografisch woordenboek, vol. II, Brussels
