= Alfred Claeys-Boùùaert (colonial administrator) =

Belgian colonial administrator and diplomat

Alfred Claeys-Boúúaert
- Alfred Claeys-Boúúaert in 1959

Governor of Ruanda-Urundi (acting)
- In office 1 January 1952 – 1 March 1955
- Preceded by: Léo Pétillon
- Succeeded by: Jean-Paul Harroy

Personal details
- Born: 31 March 1906 Ghent, East Flanders, Belgium
- Died: 9 October 1993 (aged 87) Uccle, Belgium
- Occupation: Colonial administrator

Alfred Marie Joseph Ghislain Claeys-Boúúaert (alternatively, Claeys-Bouüaert; 31 March 1906 – 9 October 1993) was a Belgian lawyer, colonial administrator and diplomat. He was acting governor of Ruanda-Urundi from 1952 to 1955. Later he served on the United Nations Trusteeship Council.

== Family ==
Alfred Marie Joseph Ghislain Claeys Bouuaert was born on 31 mars 1906 in Ghent, East Flanders, Belgium. His parents were Léon Marie Joseph Ghislain Claeys-Boúúaert (1879–1971) and Thérèse van der Straeten (1880–1969). His paternal grandfather was the lawyer and senator Alfred Louis Fernand Ghislain Claeys-Boúúaert. He obtained a doctorate in Law. On 11 January 1936 he married Ghislaine de Patoul (1911–2004).

== Career ==
In 1949 Claeys-Boúúaert was chef de cabinet to Pierre Wigny, the Belgian Minister of the Colonies. In November 1950 Robert Daniel Murphy, the American ambassador to Brussels, visited the Belgian Congo. He was accompanied by Claeys Boúúaert, Wigny's Chief of Staff, on a 20-day tour of the main centers of economic activity in the country including several mining operations.

Claeys-Boúúaert was appointed acting governor of Ruanda-Urundi on 1 January 1952, replacing Léo Pétillon. On 1 March 1955 he was replaced by Jean-Paul Harroy, the last governor before independence.

In March 1956 Claeys-Boúúaert was an alternate to the Belgian representative to the United Nations General Assembly, Pierre Ryckmans. He represented Belgium to the Food and Agriculture Organization. The 21st session of the United Nations Trusteeship Council met from 30 January to 26 March 1958. Emilio Arenales Catalán of Guatemala was elected president and Claeys-Bouuaert was elected vice-president. At the end of the session Arenales said he would no longer represent Guatelama in the United Nations, and Claeys-Bouuaert became acting president for the remainder of the year. In 1959 Claeys-Bouuaert was part of the United Nations Visiting Mission in Truk.

Alfred Claeys Bouuaert died in Uccle on 9 October 1993. His estate passed to his surviving wife, Ghislaine de Patoul, and his three children, Thierry, Marie- Christine Jeanne and Donatienne.

== Sources ==
- 1959 UN Visiting Mission in Truk, Department of Public Affairs - Public Information Office
- axiabuor, "Alfred Marie Joseph CLAEYS BOUUAERT", Geneanet
- Deschamps, Étienne (28 April 2016), Entre héritage colonial et destin européen (PDF) (thesis) (in French), Florence
- Hulsbosch, Jacques (29 February 2012), STATUTEN VERENIGING DER MEDE-EIGENAARS RESIDENTIE CALSEYDE PARK Te 9700 Oudenaarde (Eine), Omloop 35-37-39-41 (PDF) (in Dutch)
- Randaxhe, Cécile, "M Alfred CLAEYS BOÚÚAERT", Geneanet
- Roster of the United Nations (As of 31 March 1956)
- State Archives of Belgium (Ghent), "Alfred Maria Josephus Ghislenus Claeys Bouuaert", Civil registration births Belgium, Oost-Vlaanderen, Herzele and Surrounding Towns, Civil Registration, 1901-1910 - FSI, Brussels – via FamilySearch, OpenArchives
- Stockmans, Charles, "Gouverneurs du Ruanda-Urundi", Congo Belge et Ruanda-Urundi (in French), archived from the original on 2021-02-03
- US Department of State (1959), "Trusteeship System", Participation of the United States Government in International conferences July 1, 1957 - June 30, 1958, U.S. Government Printing Office
