= Justin Malfeyt =

Belgian soldier, engineer and administrator

Justin-Prudent-François-Marie Malfeyt

Governor of Orientale Province
- In office 7 November 1913 – July 1916
- Preceded by: .
- Succeeded by: Alexis Bertrand (interim); Adolphe De Meulemeester

Governor of Ruanda-Urundi
- In office 22 November 1916 – May 1919
- Preceded by: Charles Tombeur
- Succeeded by: Pierre Ryckmans

Personal details
- Born: 21 June 1862 Bruges
- Died: 26 December 1924 (aged 62) Ixelles
- Occupation: Soldier, administrator

Justin-Prudent-François-Marie Malfeyt (21 June 1862 – 26 December 1924) was a Belgian soldier, engineer and administrator. He served in various senior administrative positions in the Belgian Congo, including command of the Orientale and Katanga provinces.

== Early years ==
Justin-Prudent-François-Marie Malfeyt was born in Bruges on 21 June 1862. His parents were François-André Malfeyt, originally from the Netherlands, and Marie Joséphine Vandevelde. When he was 15 he enlisted in the engineer regiment. He passed through all the junior ranks, and left the regiment on 1 April 1883 as a second lieutenant.

== First three tours in the Congo (1891–1903) ==
Malfeyt embarked for Africa on 16 March 1891 as a sous-intendant. When he reached Boma he was assigned to command the post of Tshoa in Bas-Congo. Due to poor health he was forced to return to Boma. Due to his good understanding of administration he was assigned to the intendance service, and even acted as head of the service. During this term he undertook an administrative tour of the Cataractes region. Malfeyt returned to Europe on leave on 25 June 1894.

Malfeyt returned to the Congo on 6 March 1895 with the rank of intendant and was given command of the Falls area. When he reached Stanleyville, Hubert Lothaire and Josué Henry had just defeated the remains of the Arab bands against whom Francis Dhanis had been campaigning for two years. In August 1895 Lothaire, in Nyangwe, heard that the Luluabourg garrison had revolted on 4 July 1895, which could cause the Arabs to resume hostilities. He moved quickly to suppress the revolt. An expedition by Dhanis to occupy the Lado Enclave on the Nile that had been leased from England left on 30 September 1896. It almost turned into disaster when the troops revolted, but Henry managed to recover the situation. Malfeyt was constantly occupied in meeting the needs of the expedition while keeping the population in order and, at the end of 1897, suppressing a small Arab uprising. On 1 March 1899 Malfeyt was appointed commissaire général. He went on leave on 25 June 1899.

Malfeyt was appointed Inspecteur d'État on 20 April 1900. He embarked for Africa on 1 May 1900, and on 4 July 1900 took over command of the Orientale Province from Dhanis, who was returning to Europe. He found the situation in this huge territory unsettled. There were the remains of rebel bands in the upper Lualaba regions, and arms were coming over the border from Angola. There was some slave trading. Malfeyt made careful preparations for an expedition that began in April 1901 and was largely successful. Malfeyt was then given command of the Kivu region while awaiting the arrival of Paul Costermans. He stayed there until May 1902. In May 1903 he handed over command to the district commissioner Adolphe de Meulemeester.

== Later assignments (1903–1924) ==
Malfeyt returned to Europe on 10 October 1903. On 20 November 1903 he was promoted to high commissioner. He returned to Africa on 18 February 1904, visiting Équateur, Kasaï and Kwango. He returned to Belgium on 28 August 1905. He was promoted to intendant 2nd class on 25 March 1908. In 1909 he accompanied Prince Albert of Belgium on a tour of the Belgian Congo, travelling by rail from Cape Hope through Rhodesia to the Victoria Falls, then by caravan through Katanga and the Orientale Province. The prince returned to Belgium via Léopoldville and Boma, while Malfeyt carried out inspections in the Kasai and the Maringa-Lopori zone.

After this Malfeyt took over command of the Orientale Province. In March 1911 he inspected the Uele district, then returned to Belgium via the Nile. On 21 October 1911 Malfeyt embarked for the 6th time for Africa, appointed to command Katanga, where he replaced Émile Wangermée as governor for a year. He left for Europe via Boma on 28 December 1912. In November 1913 Malfeyt resumed command of the Orientale Province. In August 1914 World War I broke out, and the eastern border of the Congo was threatened from German East Africa, but Malfeyt took quick action to assemble and supply the Belgian troops. After he handed over command in August 1916, General Charles Tombeur led the troops against the Germans at Tabora. Alexis Bertrand took responsibility as interim deputy-governor general of Orientale Province from July 1916 to August 1917, when Adolphe De Meulemeester took over.

Malfeyt returned to Africa on 9 December 1916 as royal commissioner of the occupying authority in East Africa. On 18 December 1916 he was appointed intendant en chef of the Belgian Army. He returned from Africa in December 1919, and retired on 31 March 1921. He died in Ixelles on 26 December 1924.

== Sources ==
- Engels, A. (1952), Biographie Coloniale Belge (PDF) (in French), vol. III, Inst. roy. colon. belge
- Northrup, David (1988), Beyond the bend in the river : African labor in eastern Zaire, 1865-1940, Boston College Libraries
