= Maurice Simon (official) =

Belgian colonial administrator

Governor of Ruanda-Urundi
- In office 5 July 1946 – August 1949
- Preceded by: Eugène Jungers
- Succeeded by: Léo Pétillon

Secretary-General of the Belgian Congo
- In office October 1949 – .

Personal details
- Born: 19 July 1892 Saint-Gilles, Belgium
- Died: 24 December 1960 (aged 68) Uccle, Belgium
- Occupation: Colonial administrator.

Maurice Simon (19 July 1892 – 24 December 1960) was a Belgian colonial administrator.

== Early years ==
Maurice Simon was born on 19 July 1892 in Saint-Gilles, Belgium. His education was interrupted by the start of World War I. He served in the army and was awarded the Croix de Guerre with palm, the Yser Medal, knighthood of the Legion of Honour (military title), Commemorative Medal of the 1914–1918 War, Victory Medal 1914–1918, knighthood of the Order of the Crown (Belgium) (military title). At the end of the war, he was a "lieutenant au 25e régiment de ligne". In 1928, he was named "Capitaine". After the war, he graduated in commercial and consular science.

== Colonial career ==
At 32, Simon became a territorial administrator in the 1st class of the Basakata territory of Equateur Province in the Belgian Congo.

After seven years, he was given charge of the Lac Léopold II District. In 1931, he was transferred to Ruanda as a deputy resident at a time when the governor Charles Voisin was preparing to depose the Mwami (King) Musinga. Simon was involved in the enthronement of the successor, Mwami Mutara. In 1937, he was transferred to Kivu Province and, from there, was assigned to Usumbura as the provincial commissioner of Ruanda-Urundi.

In 1947, Simon was made governor of Ruanda-Urundi. He signed various ordinances protecting the forests and wildlife. The United Nations Trusteeship Council held its third session at Lake Success, New York, from 16 June to 5 August 1948. It reviewed the Belgian report on Ruanda-Urundi. Simon attended as Belgium's representative and responded to questions about the report and the administration of the territory. Simon toured Shangugu in 1949 and noted that the land which should have been developed for coffee plantations was still vacant. He wrote,

During my last stay in the Shangugu territory, I have noticed ... that between the big road Shangugu-Nyamasheke and the fringe of the forest [Nyungwe Forest] there are large surfaces of land practically free of any occupation... At first sight these lands seem fertile and able to be used for cultivation... in such a densely populated country like Ruanda-Urundi it is important not to neglect any arable land... Two possibilities are to be anticipated: (1) intensive occupation by an organized paysannat indigene; (2) colonization by small-scale European agrarian colonists.

In 1949, Léo Pétillon succeeded Simon, and in October 1949, was designated secretary-general of the Belgian Congo, based in Léopoldville. He died on 24 December 1960 in Uccle, Belgium. He was the Commander of the Order of Leopold II and the Royal Order of the Lion.

== Sources ==
- Department of State, Office of Public Affairs (1948), Documents & State Papers, U.S. Government Printing Office
- Harroy, Jean-Paul (1977), "SIMON (Maurice)" (PDF), Biographie Belge d'Outre-Mer (in French), vol. VII–B, Académie Royale des Sciences d'Outre-Mer, pp. col. 345–346
- Melkebeke, Sven Van (2020-06-22), Dissimilar Coffee Frontiers: Mobilizing Labor and Land in the Lake Kivu Region, Congo and Rwanda (1918-1960/62), BRILL, ISBN 978-90-04-42849-2
