= Alfred Marzorati =

Belgian lawyer and colonial administrator (1881–1955)

Alfred Frédéric Gérard Marzorati

Royal Commissioner for Occupied East Africa
- In office May 1919 – March 1921
- Preceded by: Justin Malfeyt
- Succeeded by: (self)

Royal Commissioner of Ruanda-Urundi
- In office March 1921 – 28 August 1926
- Preceded by: (self)
- Succeeded by: (self)

Governor of Ruanda-Urundi and Deputy Governor-General of the Belgian Congo
- In office 28 August 1926 – 5 February 1929
- Preceded by: (self)
- Succeeded by: Louis Joseph Postiaux

Personal details
- Born: 28 September 1881 Tournai, Belgium
- Died: 11 December 1955 (aged 74) Uccle, Belgium
- Occupation: Lawyer and colonial administrator

Alfred Frédéric Gérard Marzorati (28 September 1881 – 11 December 1955) was a Belgian lawyer and colonial administrator. He served at the bar in Brussels, then became a magistrate in the Belgian Congo. During World War I he was a legal advisor to the Belgian forces occupying German East Africa. He was appointed royal commissioner in charge of the Belgian mandate of Ruanda-Urundi in 1919, and strongly supported the 1926 administrative union between these territories and the Belgian Congo.

Marzorati left Africa due to health problems in 1929, and retired from the colonial service in 1931 to take up an academic career, but continued to play an active role in Belgian colonial affairs for the remainder of his life. He was opposed to bringing European settlers to Africa, and saw Belgium's role as being to help the indigenous people develop a modern economy and political structure which could become fully autonomous.

== Early years (1881–1912) ==
Alfred-Frédéric-Gérard Marzorati was born in Tournai, Belgium on 28 September 1881. His parents were Clément-Auguste Marzorati and Marie-Agnès Ervens. Marzorati attended the Free University of Brussels from 1899 to 1904, graduating with a doctorate in Law. He joined the bar in Brussels, interned with the permanent deputy M. Richard and then became an assistant to Thomas Braun. He became an advocate at the Brussels Court of Appeal.

== Colonial administrator ==
=== Magistrate, Belgian Congo (1912–1916) ===
On 27 January 1912 Marzorati became a deputy magistrate in Elizabethville in the Belgian Congo. He then became a deputy of the public prosecutor in Tanganika-Moero territory. In 1914, just before the start of World War I (1914–1918) Marzorati was appointed a judge in the court of Lomami Territory. From 13 November 1914 to 28 March 1915 he was in charge of the Lomami District administration. He then became the president judge at the court of first instance in Stanleyville, and chair of the council of war in Kongolo.

=== Legal advisor, East Africa (1917–1919) ===
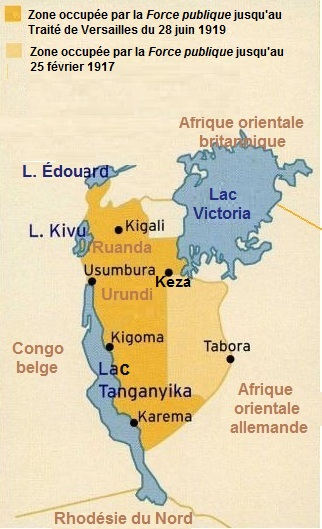
Belgian occupation of German East Africa 1916–1919

Marzorati was on leave from 6 July 1916 to 23 January 1917 in Le Havre and London. He was then appointed auditor general of the occupation troops in the territories that had been conquered from German East Africa, as well as legal advisor to General Justin Malfeyt, commissioner royal in charge of the regions of German East Africa controlled by Belgian troops. He was based first in Tabora and then in Kigoma.

=== Royal commissioner, Ruanda-Urundi (1919–1926) ===
When General Malfeyt returned to Europe in December 1919, Marzorati became interim royal commissioner. In March 1921 Marzorati arranged for the transfer to British control of the East African regions occupied by Belgium apart from Ruanda and Urundi. On 21 September 1921 Marzorati returned to Belgium on leave. He was promoted to commissioner general. He married, and returned to Usumbura in Urundi with his wife. During his absence Pierre Ryckmans, the future governor general of the Belgian Congo, was acting royal commissioner.

By late 1924 the Belgian Foreign Ministry was starting to suspect that German agitation for return of her colonies was affecting British opinion. Marzorati was concerned that loss of Ruanda and Urundi would deprive Belgium of a source of food and labor for the Katanga mines. He advised the minister that if the territories were to be returned, favorable boundaries should at least be guaranteed. The director general of the colonial ministry, Halewyck de Heusch, prompted the minister to ask the governor general of the Congo and Marzorati whether their administrations should be merged. Marzorati fully approved of the idea, since the more developed administration of the Congo had the people and resources to maintain order and introduce "civilization" through education, infrastructure, penal reforms and stronger administration.

=== Governor, Ruanda-Urundi (1926–1929) ===
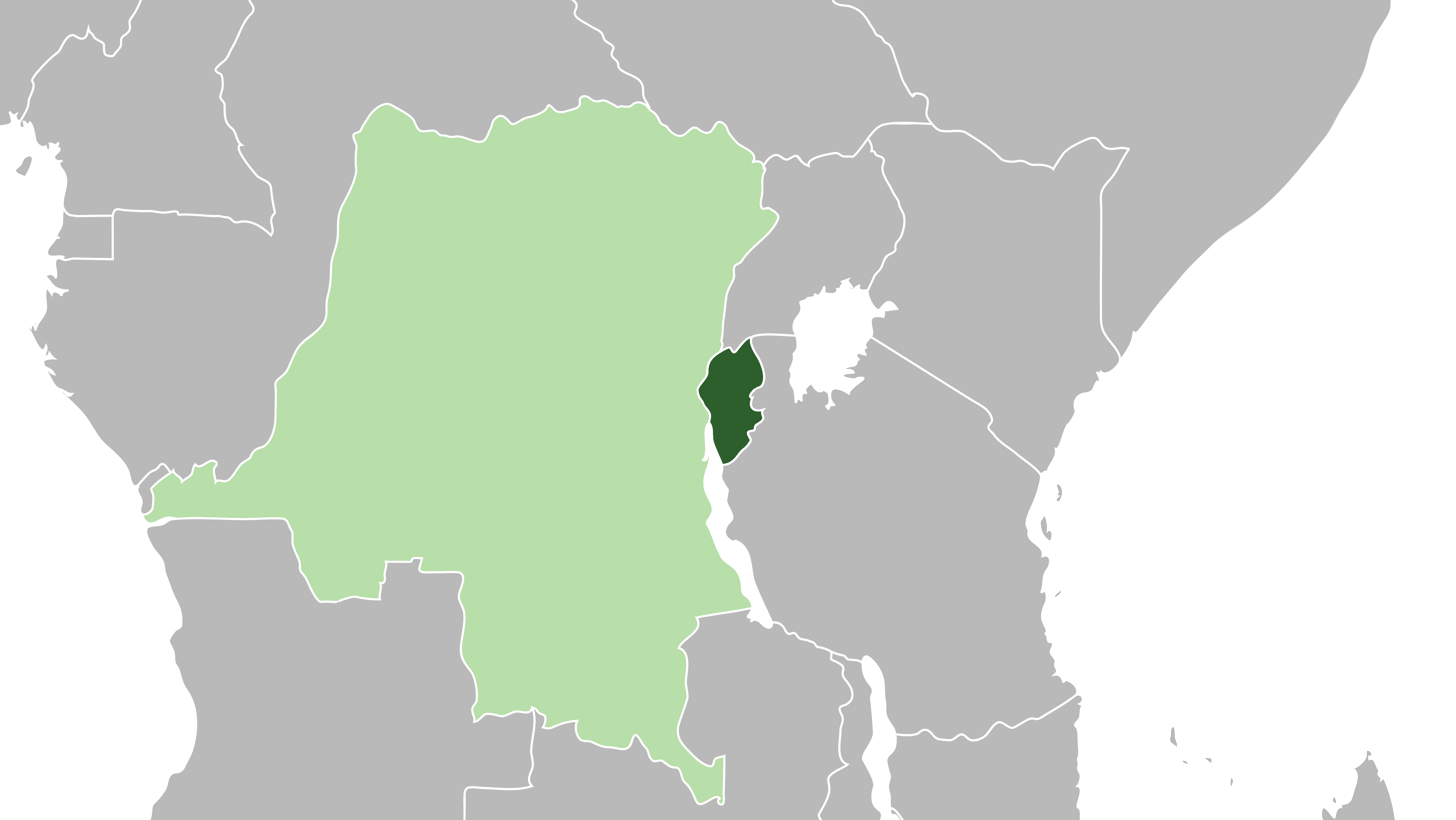
Ruanda-Urundi and the Belgian Congo

Marzorati returned on leave to Belgium on 17 December 1925. He was more interested in the Belgian Congo than the mandated territories, and in 1925 arranged for an administrative union between Ruanda-Urundi and the Belgian Congo, and a change in his title from royal commissioner to vice-governor general of the Belgian Congo and governor of Ruanda-Urundi. On 28 August 1926 he was appointed vice-governor general of the Belgian Congo and governor of Ruanda-Urundi. These territories were not legally part of the Belgian Congo, but were subject to control by the Permanent Mandates Commission of the League of Nations. Marzorati represented the Belgian government to this commission. The administrative union with the Belgian Congo was controversial, and Marzorati met the commission in Geneva in 1926 to explain it.

Marzorati did not always get on well with Pierre Ryckmans, his subordinate. In May 1927 the agent in charge of the school at Muramvya caused a serious incident. A large group of local people had gathered to dance as a sign of allegiance, but the agent told them to first lay down their weapons, which was contrary to all traditions. Marzorati ordered a strong military march through the region, which Ryckmans opposed on the basis that Belgian superiority was already established. Ryckmans explained at length about the meaning of kwiyereka dances, with many historical examples, before Marzorati backed down. Later Ryckmans learned that Madame Marzorati held grievances against him for pruning the eucalyptus and flamboyant trees in the governor's gardens.

Marzorati wanted to maintain the traditional local laws to the extent they were compatible with Belgian colonial ordinances, and gradually adapt these laws to cultural and economic developments. He tried to improve agricultural production to avoid periodic famines, promote development of an indigenous peasantry and facilitate temporary movement of labor to the industrial centers of Katanga Province in the Belgian Congo. Marzorati notified the White Fathers on 20 May 1928 that the rules regarding installation of chapel schools were being modified to allow schools of different denominations to be established. Permission to use sites that had not yet been occupied was withdrawn, and administrative pressure was applied to ensure that any temporary structures would gradually be abandoned and only durable structures would remain.

Louis Joseph Postiaux assumed office as deputy governor general of Ruanda-Urundi in August 1926. At the end of 1928 Marzorati almost died from typhoid fever, and Postiaux took over as acting governor in January 1929.

== Later career (1931–1955) ==
Marzorati returned to Europe on 3 February 1929. During his convalescence he chaired the manpower advisory committee for Ruandi-Urundi, but due to his health could not return to Central Africa. In November 1929 Marzorati again met the Permanent Mandates Commission in Geneva to defend Belgium against strong public criticism of the response to the Rwandan famine. He retired from the colonial service on 9 February 1931. In 1931 he rejoined the Brussels bar, and defended some cases assigned to him by the Ministry of Finance. He represented the government on the Board of the Société minière du Kasai.

On 16 May 1931 Marzorati became a lecturer of the Free University of Brussels, holding this position for twenty years. At the start of World War II he became temporary professor of comparative colonial policy and the economic regime of the Belgian Congo at the University of Brussels. After World War II he also taught at the university's Political and Social Sciences School and Business School. He became an associate of the Royal Belgian Colonial Institute (now the Royal Academy for Overseas Sciences) on 25 June 1931, and a full member on 24 October 1946. He died in Uccle, Belgium on 11 December 1955.

== Views ==
Marzorati was opposed to colonization of Africa by white settlers, and wrote in 1954, "The only duty of government is to create the foundation which will allow indigenous society to gradually attain what we might call autonomy, in the sense that this word has in the countries of the West, and to set aside all that is contrary to this development." He believed in intense industrialization, combined with a policy of high wages, which would cause natural selection of profitable businesses and build a self-sufficient economy. In parallel the political evolution of Africans would develop based on district and territorial councils. In 1953 he said, "Better a healthy and vigorous associate, than a weak and discontented servant."

Before his death Marzorati, a socialist, expressed hope that a movement would be started to consider African peoples and their problems. A.A.J. Van Bilsen tried to realize this wish, and with a group of African and Belgian friends formed the "Groupe-Marzorati" to consider the problem of raising the political awareness of the Congolese without losing sight of the economic, social and educational issues, and the administrative and cultural conditions that constrain politics.

== Sources ==
- Cornet, Anne (2011), Politiques de santé et contrôle social au Rwanda: 1920–1940 (in French), KARTHALA Editions, ISBN 978-2-8111-0485-6
- Des Forges, Alison (2011), Defeat Is the Only Bad News: Rwanda under Musinga, 1896–1931, Univ of Wisconsin Press, ISBN 978-0-299-28143-4
- Matoto, H. (December 1958), "Reviewed Work: 'Vers l'indépendance du Congo et du Ruanda Urundi' by A. A. J. Van Bilsen", Présence Africaine (23), Présence Africaine Editions: 130–133, JSTOR 24345410
- Pedersen, Susan (2015), The Guardians: The League of Nations and the Crisis of Empire, Oxford University Press, ISBN 978-0-19-973003-2
- Vanderlinden, Jacques (1994), Pierre Ryckmans 1891–1959: Coloniser dans l'honneur (in French), De Boeck Supérieur, ISBN 978-2-8041-1881-5
- Walraet, M. (1968), "Mazorati (Alfred-Frédéric-Gérard", Biographie Belge d'Outre-Mer (in French), vol. VI, Académie Royale des Sciences d'Outre-Mer, pp. col. 695–704
