= Louis Postiaux =

Belgian colonial administrator

Governor of Ruanda-Urundi
- In office 5 February 1929 – 4 July 1930
- Preceded by: Alfred Marzorati
- Succeeded by: Charles Voisin

Governor of Katanga
- In office September 1931 – January 1932
- Preceded by: Gaston Heenen; Rodolphe Dufour (interim)
- Succeeded by: Gaston Heenen

Personal details
- Born: 15 August 1882 La Hulpe, Belgium
- Died: 31 March 1948 (aged 65) Antwerp, Belgium

Louis Joseph Postiaux (15 August 1882 – 31 March 1948) was a Belgian colonial administrator who was governor of Ruanda-Urundi, and then governor of Katanga Province.

== Early years (1882–1905) ==
Louis-Joseph Postiaux was born in La Hulpe, Belgium, on 15 August 1882. His parents were Jean-Baptiste-Alexis Postiaux and Elise Hernalsteen. After completing his secondary education he worked for several employers before entering the colonial service in 1905 as a clerk 1st class.

== Congo (1905–1926) ==
Postiaux left Antwerp on 19 October 1905 bound for the Congo Free State. On 10 November 1905 he joined the administrative service in Boma in the Bas Congo. He moved to Orientale Province on 14 February 1907, and was promoted to chief clerk on 1 July 1907. He returned to Belgium on leave, then left again for what was now the Belgian Congo on 5 May 1910, where he served his second term as an administrative officer 3rd class. He took five months leave in 1912, then returned as an administrative officer 2nd class. In his fourth term he held the rank of director. In 1924 the governor general Martin Rutten appointed Postiaux deputy secretary-general. Postiaux returned to Europe at the end of May 1926.

== Ruanda-Urundi (1926–1930) ==
In July 1926 Postiaux left Marseille for Ruanda-Urundi, where he had been appointed deputy governor general. He assumed office in August 1926. The governor, Alfred Marzorati, was more interested in the Belgian Congo than the mandated territories, and in 1925 had arranged for an administrative union between Ruanda-Urundi and the Belgian Congo, and a change in his title from royal commissioner to vice-governor general of the Belgian Congo and governor of Ruanda-Urundi. At the end of 1928 Marzorati almost died from typhoid fever, and Postiaux took over as governor. Postiaux succeeded Marzorati in January 1929. (Note: Des Forges (2011) says Henri Postiaux succeeded Marzorati in January 1929. This must be an error.)

Postiaux was governor of Ruanda-Urundi until July 1930. (Note: Cornet (2011) says Postiaux was governor of Ruanda-Urundi from August 1926 to July 1930. This is perhaps to due confusion between the change in title from deputy governor of Ruanda-Urundi to governor of Ruanda-Urundi and deputy governor of the Belgian Congo.) He took over as governor at a time of crisis in the colony, after a failed harvest in 1928 had led to starvation in eastern Rwanda, and the notables had opposed extending cultivation to the wet lowlands where they grazed their cattle. Postiaux toured Ruanda in April 1929, and remarked that the notables were demoralized by loss of authority and the threat of losing their cattle, while the people were suffering from a famine in which 35,000 to 40,000 had died. Postiaux reverted to a policy in which the notables regained some of their power. However, influenced by Bishop Classe, Postiaux wrote the following circular to the Ruanda residents on 2 October 1929:

A second abuse that ought equally to be foreseen is that which consists in recognising natives of lower rank (bahutu or batwa) as having, even over goods produced by their labour or acquired by means of its fruits, only an incomplete right (usufruct, use, possession for life etc. ) which has nothing of the character of an absolute property right. We must assure this respect for an absolute right on movable property and cattle that workers have acquired by their toil. By tolerating that a right; either wholly or in part, over wealth not created by them and without a true concession of land or breeding cattle, should pass into the hands of the Batusi chiefs or other notables, the authorities, would, in reality, be making themselves accomplices to an assumption of property rights which neither custom nor traditions suffice to justify or authorise... If the native does not have any precise notion of these juridical ideas at the moment, it is incumbent on us to educate him on the matter, correcting his errors and moulding his mentality with perseverance and patience.

Postiaux sought permission from Brussels to end the monarchy and have the Resident and the notables administer the colony directly. On 28 May 1929 he wrote to the Minister of Colonies, "I can conclude that the government would not expose itself in Rwanda to any setback by relegating Musinga and providing him with a pension which should certainly not reach [...] the impressive sum represented by the 20th of the tax received in Rwanda and the tribute paid to him in kind by subjects over whom in reality he no longer exercises any authority other than that which we strive to retain: the most powerful provincial heads having virtually freed themselves and being perfectly suited to the new regime where the European authority has completely replaced […] the much less appreciated Mwami. His request was refused. He met with King Musinga and defined his role as being to execute the decisions of the Belgians and to sort out minor issues of no concern to the Belgians. Musinga partially agreed, but insisted on retaining an appearance of power, and worked on restoring his prestige with the notables.

In 1929 Postiaux called a "surprise meeting" of all the traditional chiefs of Rwanda in which he told them that all Rwandans must acquire an 8-page booklet that identified the holder. It included their name, photograph, date of birth, residence and so on, and their ethnicity, which must be Hutu, Tutsi or Twa. The penal code specified that eight whips would be administered to anyone who failed to get the booklet. In the long term, this strict classification of ethnic identity would be one of the causes of the Rwandan genocide in the post-colonial era.

In 1930 Postiaux was succeeded by Charles Henri Joseph Voisin.

== Congo (1930–1934) ==
Postiaux returned in July 1930 and was assigned to the Congo until March 1931. Postiaux was governor of the province of Katanga from 1 September 1931 to 30 March 1932. He succeeded Gaston-René Heenan, and was replaced by Gaston-René Heenan, who returned for a second term of office. During his ninth term of service he replaced General Auguste Tilkens in January 1932 as acting Governor-General of the Belgian Congo. He was acting governor general from 1932 to 1934. In November 1934 Postiaux confirmed that he meant to end his career in Africa. He was quickly replaced as deputy governor general by General Paul Ermens.

== Later career (1934–1948) ==
After returning to Belgium Postiaux was a member of the Colonial Pensions Commission until his retirement in February 1935. He became vice-president of the commission for protection of the indigenous arts and trades, and replaced Jules Destrée as president of the commission in 1936. In August 1939 he promoted a decree to ensure the protection of indigenous artistic sites and works in the Congo. He was appointed the delegate of the government in the Société des mines d'or de KiloMoto, and was made head of the Colonial School in Brussels. Postiaux died in Antwerp, Belgium, on 31 March 1948.

== Honors ==
- Commander of the Order of Leopold II
- Commander of the Order of the Crown (Belgium)
- Officer of the Royal Order of the Lion
- Knight of the Order of the African Star
- Commander of the Military Order of Christ (Portugal)
- Commander of the Order of the Black Star (France);
- Officer of the Legion of Honour (France)
- Officer of the Order of the Crown of Italy

== Sources ==
- Cornet, Anne (2011), Politiques de santé et contrôle social au Rwanda: 1920-1940 (in French), KARTHALA Editions, ISBN 978-2-8111-0485-6
- Des Forges, Alison (17 May 2011), Defeat Is the Only Bad News: Rwanda under Musinga, 1896–1931, Univ of Wisconsin Press, ISBN 978-0-299-28143-4
- Jean de-la Croix Tabaro (17 July 2015), "Rwanda's Notorious Passport To Death, a KT Press Report", 24-7 Press Release
- Jean Omasombo Tshonda (2018), Haut-Katanga (PDF) (in French), Musée royal de l’Afrique centrale, ISBN 978-9-4926-6907-0
- Linden, Ian (1975), The White Fathers' Mission in Rwanda (PDF) (Thesis)
- Coosemans, M. (1968), "POSTIAUX (Louis-Joseph)" (PDF), Biographie Belge d'Outre-Mer (in French), vol. VI, Acad. Roy. Science d'Outre-Mer, pp. col.831–833
- Pedersen, Susan (2015), The Guardians: The League of Nations and the Crisis of Empire, Oxford University Press, ISBN 978-0-19-957048-5
- Rutayisire, Paul (2009), "Le remodelage de l'espace culturel rwandais par l'Église et la colonisation", Revue d'Histoire de la Shoah (in French) (1 (N° 190)): 83–103, doi:10.3917/rhsho.190.0083
- Vanderlinden, Jacques (1994-04-15), Pierre Ryckmans 1891-1959: Coloniser dans l'honneur (in French), De Boeck Supérieur, ISBN 978-2-8041-1881-5
