= Pierre Ryckmans (governor-general) =

Belgian colonial administrator

Pierre, 1st Graaf Ryckmans
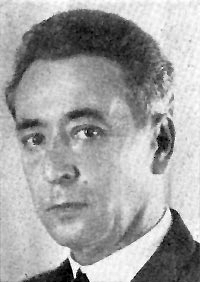

Governor-General of the Belgian Congo
- In office 14 September 1934 – 31 December 1946
- Monarch: Leopold III
- Preceded by: Auguste Tilkens
- Succeeded by: Eugène Jungers

Personal details
- Born: 23 November 1891 Antwerp, Belgium
- Died: 18 February 1959 (aged 67) Uccle, Belgium
- Education: Catholic University of Leuven

Pierre Ryckmans (23 November 1891 – 18 February 1959) was a Belgian colonial administrator who served as Governor-General of Belgium's principal African colony, the Belgian Congo, between 1934 and 1946. Ryckmans began his career in the colonial service in 1915 and also spent time in the Belgian mandate of Ruanda-Urundi. His term as Governor-General of the Belgian Congo coincided with World War II in which he was instrumental in bringing the colony into the war on the Allied side after Belgium's defeat in May 1940. He was also a prolific writer on colonial affairs. He was posthumously created a peer of the realm in the Belgian nobility with the rank of count in 1962.

== Biography ==
=== Early life ===
Ryckmans was born in Antwerp in Flanders, Belgium, as the sixth child of Alphonse Ryckmans and Clémence Van Ryn. The Ryckmans family originally came from Mechelen where his ancestors were lawyers for two generations. His father Alphonse was a prominent member of the Catholic Party, a senator in the Belgian Senate, and a city councillor.

Ryckmans enrolled at the Catholic University of Leuven in Leuven to study philosophy. During his first year of studies, he translated a novel by the Spanish writer Vicente Blasco Ibáñez. After two years of philosophy studies and one year of preparation for law school, he spent one more year in Braunfels, Germany (learning German), and then several months in Galway, Ireland (learning English), and then on the Aran Islands, where he learnt his sixth living language, Irish. He received his law degree in Leuven in 1913.

=== World War I and Africa ===
He had been called to the bar in Antwerp when World War I started. Volunteering for military service in August 1914, he spent the winter on the Yser Front, where he apparently enjoyed the camaraderie at the front, despite the hardships. But he had been drawn to Africa, even before the war, so he applied when Belgium wanted officers for overseas service in Belgian colonies. After a month and a half at Officers' School in September 1915, he left for Africa, first for Cameroon, then Kitega (the principal town of Urundi, present-day Burundi) where he arrived in August 1916. He was then posted to Mahenge in German East Africa (part of present-day Tanzania) in 1917, returning to Kitega in July 1918.

He went on leave in 1920, and on 3 February 1920 married Madeleine Nève in Belgium. They returned to Urundi via the Cape and the Congo. Ryckmans then stayed in Usumbura, as Acting Royal Commissioner during the leave of the serving Royal Commissioner, Alfred Marzorati, before returning to Kitega, where he remained until 1928.

These years as Resident-Commissioner for Urundi were probably the happiest of his life. When he arrived in 1916, Urundi was divided. The chiefs were fighting for power; the Mwami (king), Mutaga IV, had died in 1915, leaving as heir, Mwambatsu, a boy of only five years of age. Ryckmans worked to create a regency council, including some political opponents, and then made it adopt reforms pertaining to land tenure and cattle contracts. These reforms eased some burden on the poorest of peasants.

=== Governor-General of the Belgian Congo ===
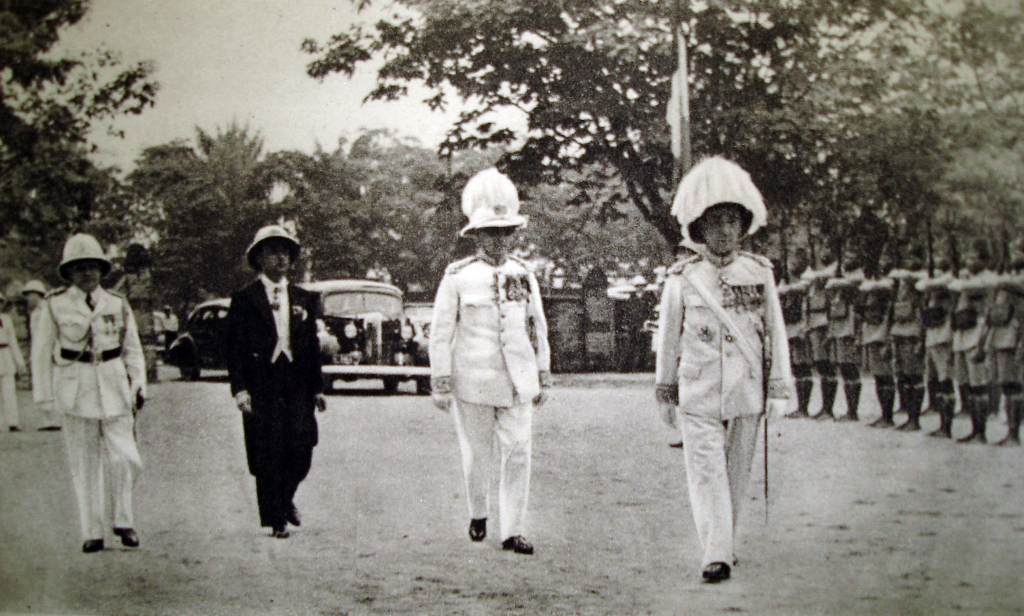
Ryckmans as Governor-General of the Belgian Congo at the inauguration of the monument to King Albert I in Léopoldville, 1938

==== Interwar period ====
Ryckmans returned to Europe in 1928 and joined the bar in Brussels. However, he spent a lot of his time giving public lectures on the role of Belgium in Africa. Some of these lectures were later published in two books, Dominer pour Servir (1932) and La Politique Coloniale (1934). He then returned to Africa for six months in 1931–32 as a member of a commission tasked with studying the labour problem, and was put in charge of Congo-Kasai province. Upon his return to Belgium, he again gave lectures at the Colonial University in Antwerp, and appeared in radio talks about Congo for Belgian radio listeners (published in Allo Congo in 1934). In October 1934 he was appointed Governor-General of the Belgian Congo.

At that time, the Belgian Congo was badly hit by the economic crisis triggered by the Great Depression. The European population in the Belgian Congo (23,000 in 1931) had dropped to just 18,000. Harsh reforms introduced by the previous Governor-General, Auguste Tilkens, had discouraged employees from working in the civil service. The Belgian devaluation of 1935, under the Paul Van Zeeland government, enabled the new Governor-General to lower duties on imports and raise duties on exports, balancing the colony's budget. This move, with the support of the Belgian Minister for Colonies, Edmond Rubbens, helped revive the Belgian Congo's economy. By 1936, the economic situation was improving rapidly. Ryckmans was also very active, not staying long in the capital Léopoldville (now Kinshasa) and touring the colony frequently.

At the time, not only the government, but also simple administration services, were all centralised in Brussels, and all civil servants were appointed by Brussels. The Governor-General could pass regulations, but any such legislation had to be approved by a ministerial decree within six months. Therefore, some of the reforms he wanted – such as recruiting magistrates from the ranks of local experienced administrative officers with a law degree - could not be put into practice. Ryckmans also stressed the importance of the independence of administration from private interests, such as the large mining companies, and the right of both Protestants and Catholics to receive government subsidies for their schools.

==== World War II ====
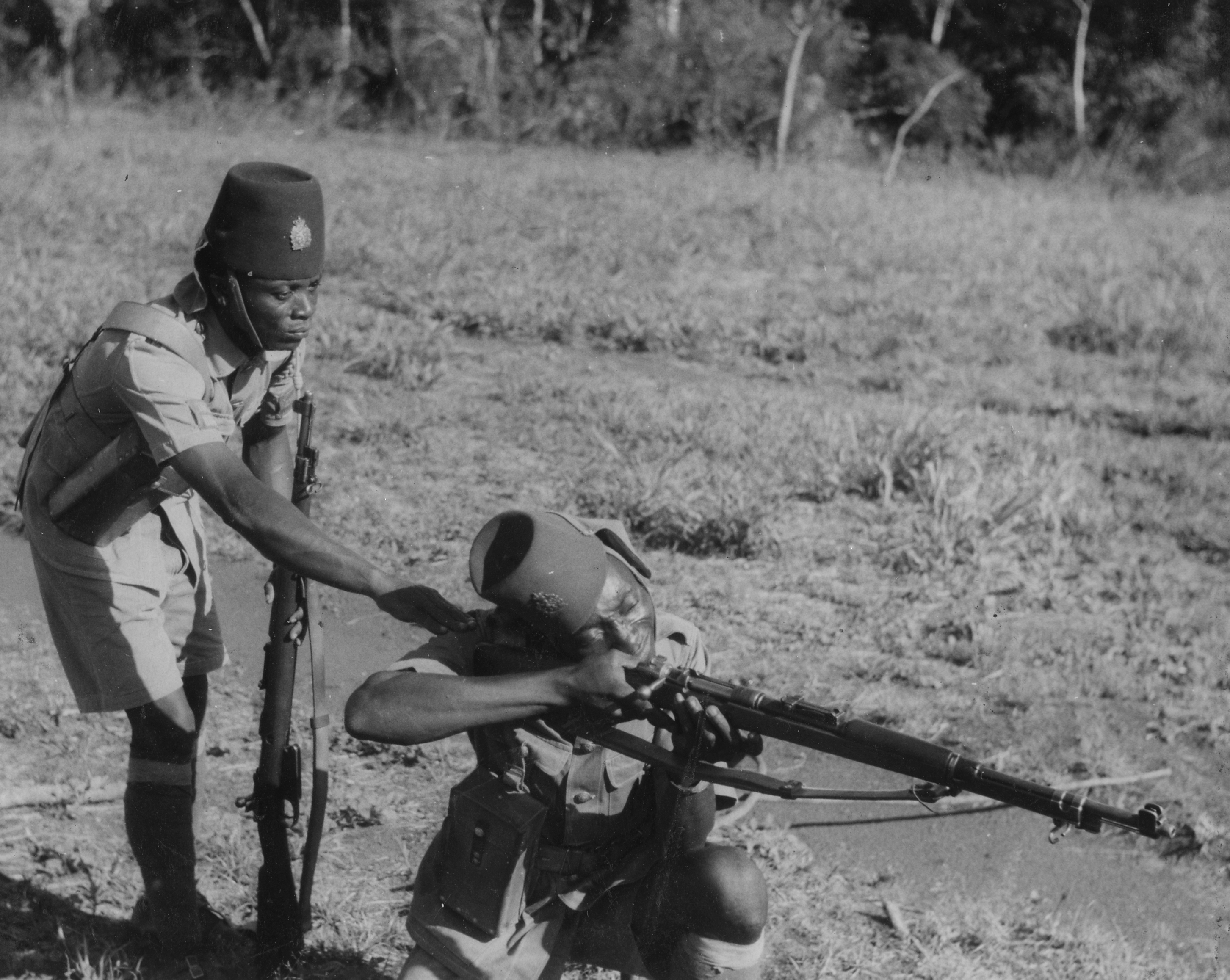
Two Force Publique soldiers in 1943

His first five years in the Belgian Congo - during which he was twice on leave – were years of progress for the administration. In September 1939 World War II broke out in Europe, but Belgium remained neutral. On 10 May 1940, Germany invaded Belgium, bringing the country into the war. On that day, four of Ryckmans's eight children were in Belgium. Two daughters, who first fled as refugees into France with their aunt, managed to get to Lisbon, and were reunited with their parents in September, while two of his sons spent the whole war in Belgium.

In the Belgian Congo, it was unclear how Belgium's surrender on 28 May 1940, and the following German occupation, should affect the colony. Ryckmans, who was strongly pro-Allied, insisted that the Belgian Congo declare its allegiance to the Allies. However, he encountered various opposition - on the one hand, the colonial military command initially advocated neutrality, while on the other hand, some officers wanted to fight the Italian Royal Army in Italian Ethiopia, even though Belgium was not yet formally at war with the Kingdom of Italy. As a result, some whites in the Belgian Congo believed Ryckmans was "too soft". The Governor-General had received no instructions from the Belgian government in exile, established in London, which since its hesitations in July 1940 had lost much of its prestige. Instead, he engaged in important discussions with the Allies who saw the Belgian Congo as an important provider of strategic materials needed for the war effort – at first gold, and then (following the attack on Pearl Harbor in December 1941 and United States' entry into the war) tin, rubber – and finally uranium.

Ryckmans attended the Brazzaville Conference from 30 January to 8 February 1944.

Meanwhile, the Belgian government in exile wanted to curb Ryckmans' powers, censor his speeches and curb his independence. At the same time, local Europeans set up trade unions, while both European and African workers launched a series of strikes that he was forced to deal with. A collection of his wartime speeches, titled Messages de Guerre, was published in 1945.

=== United Nations ===
Ryckmans wanted his successor to inherit the legacy of political changes which had been launched in the Belgian Congo. In his last speech in Africa, Vers l'Avenir, later published in his speeches to the government council in Etapes et Jalons (1946), he spoke mainly about the aid which Belgium must give to the Belgian Congo, in order to allow the Belgian Congo to improve the well-being of its inhabitants.

For a number of years, until 1957, he defended the work done by Belgium in Ruanda-Urundi in the United Nations Trusteeship Council. He was also Belgium's Commissioner for Nuclear Energy and helped with re-negotiating the terms of the cooperation between Belgium, the United Kingdom and the United States following the Atomic Energy Act of 1946. He was also a member of the council of Lovanium University, the first Congolese university founded in 1954. For health reasons, he did not play a role in preparing the Belgian Congo for independence in the late 1950s. He died in February 1959, 16 months before Congolese independence on 30 June 1960.

== Family ==
In 1960, during the chaos that followed the independence of the Congo, his son, André Ryckmans, who was a civil servant in Bas-Congo, was in a helicopter looking for isolated Europeans. The helicopter came down in Lukala, a small town in Bas-Congo. André and the pilot were taken prisoner and then killed by Congolese soldiers.

In 1962, father and son were posthumously ennobled by King Baudouin of Belgium and given the title of Graaf (count) in the Belgian nobility.

His nephew, Simon Leys, born Pierre Ryckmans is an accomplished sinologist

== Honours ==
- Grand cross in Order of St. Sylvester. (Holy See) - 1945

== See also ==
- List of colonial governors of Ruanda-Urundi
- List of colonial governors of the Congo Free State and Belgian Congo

== Works cited ==
- Williams, Susan (2018). Spies in the Congo: The Race for the Ore that Built the Atomic Bomb. Oxford University Press. ISBN 9781787380653.
