= Rwakayihura famine =

1928–1929 famine in Africa

The Rwakayihura famine was a major famine which occurred in the Belgian mandate of Ruanda-Urundi (modern-day Rwanda and Burundi) between 1928 and 1929. It was particularly acute in central and eastern Ruanda where its effects continued until 1930. It is believed to have caused tens of thousands of deaths.
