= Lippens =

Coat of Arms of the Lippens family

The Lippens family is a noted Belgian noble family. The word is a form of Philippus. Members of the family held important political positions in Belgium and were awarded with title of Count.

== People with the surname ==
- Danny Lippens (born 1961), Belgian racing cyclist
- Hippolyte Lippens (1847–1906), Belgian lawyer, businessman, politician
- Léon Lippens (rower), Belgian rower
- Léon Lippens (1911-1986), Belgian politician and conservationist
- Martin Lippens (1934-2016), Belgian football player
- Maurice Lippens (governor) (1875–1956), former governor of Belgian Congo
- Maurice Lippens (businessman) (born 1943), Belgian businessman, grandson of the governor
- Willi Lippens (born 1945), German-Dutch football player

== Other ==
- Lippens (mango), a mango cultivar that originated in south Florida (Peter and Irene Lippens)
- 9640 Lippens, a main-belt asteroid, (Carlos Lippens, born 1945)
