= Moerbeke Sugar Factory =

Former sugar refinery in Moerbeke-Waas, Belgium

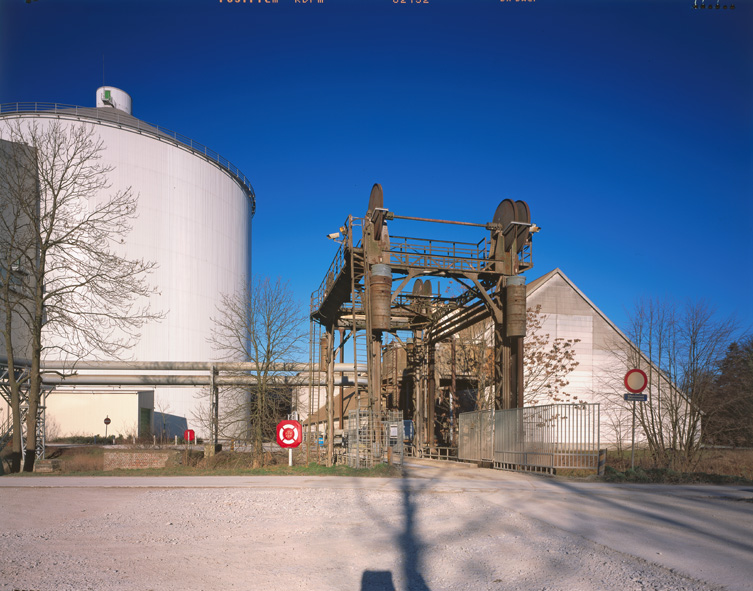
- Former sugar silo of the factory in 2005. The old Vapeurbrug still stands.

- Location within Belgium
- Built: 7 augustus 1867
- Location: Opperstraat 108, Moerbeke-Waas, Belgium
- Coordinates: 51°10′21″N 3°56′03″E
- Products: sugar
- Employees: 95 (2007)
- Owner: Iscal Sugar (last)
- Defunct: 26 December 2007

The Moerbeke Sugar Factory was a beet sugar factory in Moerbeke, Belgium. The factory was last part of Iscal Sugar, a competitor of Raffinerie Tirlemontoise. In 2008, the factory was shut down and later completely demolished.

== Sucrerie Jules De Cock & Co (1869-1893) ==
=== Foundation ===
In 1869 the partnership limited by shares Sucrerie Jules De Cock et Compagnie was founded by contract. It is claimed that the Lippens family and the De Kerchove family together held 37.5% of the shares. Jules de Cock might be related to Albert de Cock, who got permission to found a distillery in Moerbeke on 5 January 1869.

=== The Lippens and De Kerchove families ===
The Lippens family had acquired a lot of land in the area, especially during the French period. In Moerbeke municipality alone, this was 715 hectares. The family also held political power in the municipality. Filips-Jean Lippens (1772-1839) married Victoria Amelie de Naeyere, and had Auguste Marie Lippens (1818-1892). Auguste would become mayor of Moerbeke in 1847 and a member of parliament. He was most probably one of the founders of Moerbeke Sugar Factory.

The Kerchove family was a rich noble family with strong roots in the east of the County of Flanders. It was very influential in the liberal party. The engineer Charles de Kerchove de Denterghem (1819-1882) was mayor of Gent and a member of parliament. He married Eugénie de Limon. Their children married the children of Auguste Lippens. Oswald de Kerchove de Denterghem (1844-1906) married Marie Stephanie Lippens. Louise Marie de Kerchove de Denterghem married Hippolyte Lippens (1847-1906).

=== Location of the factory ===
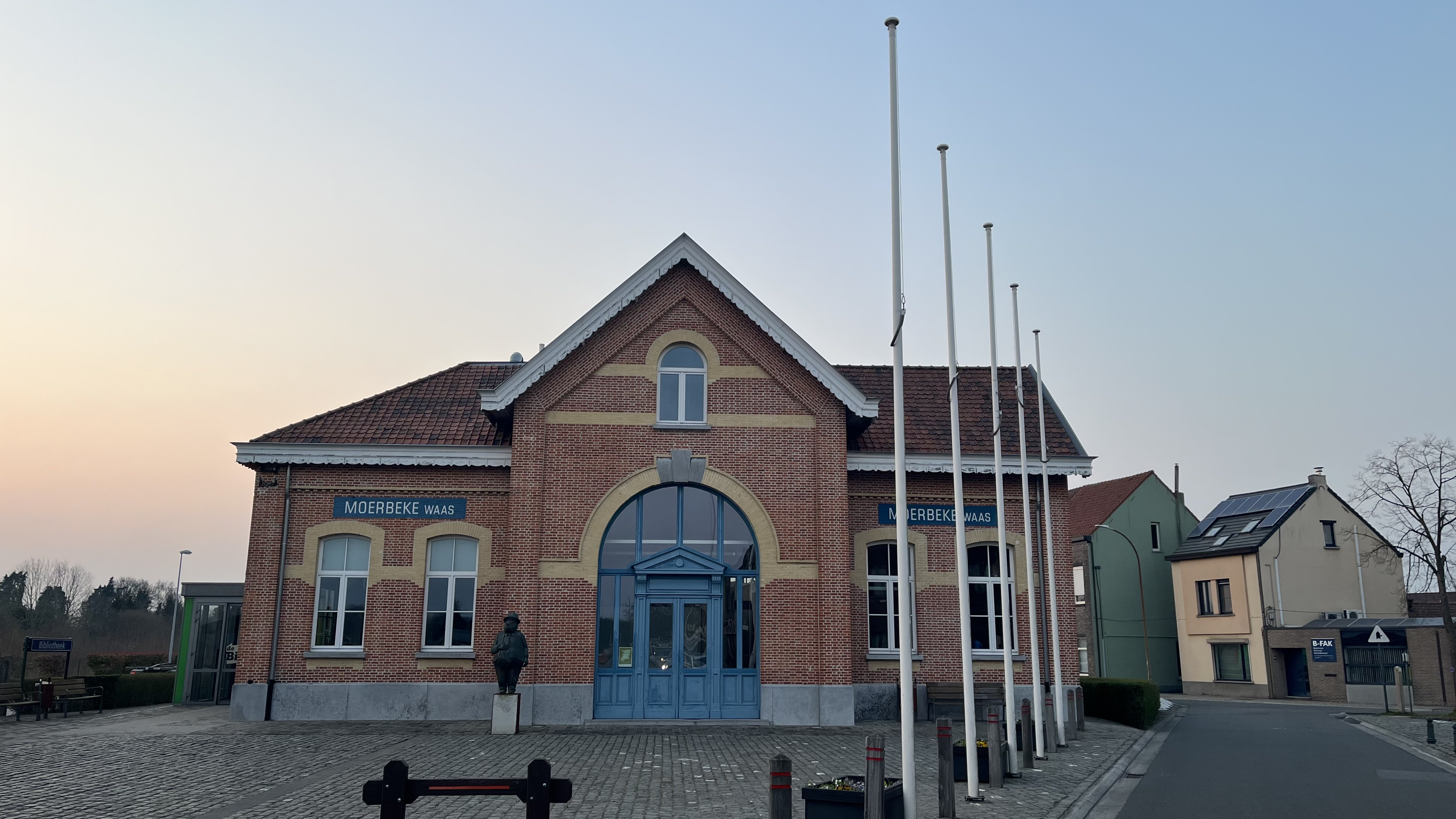
Moerbeke station in 2022

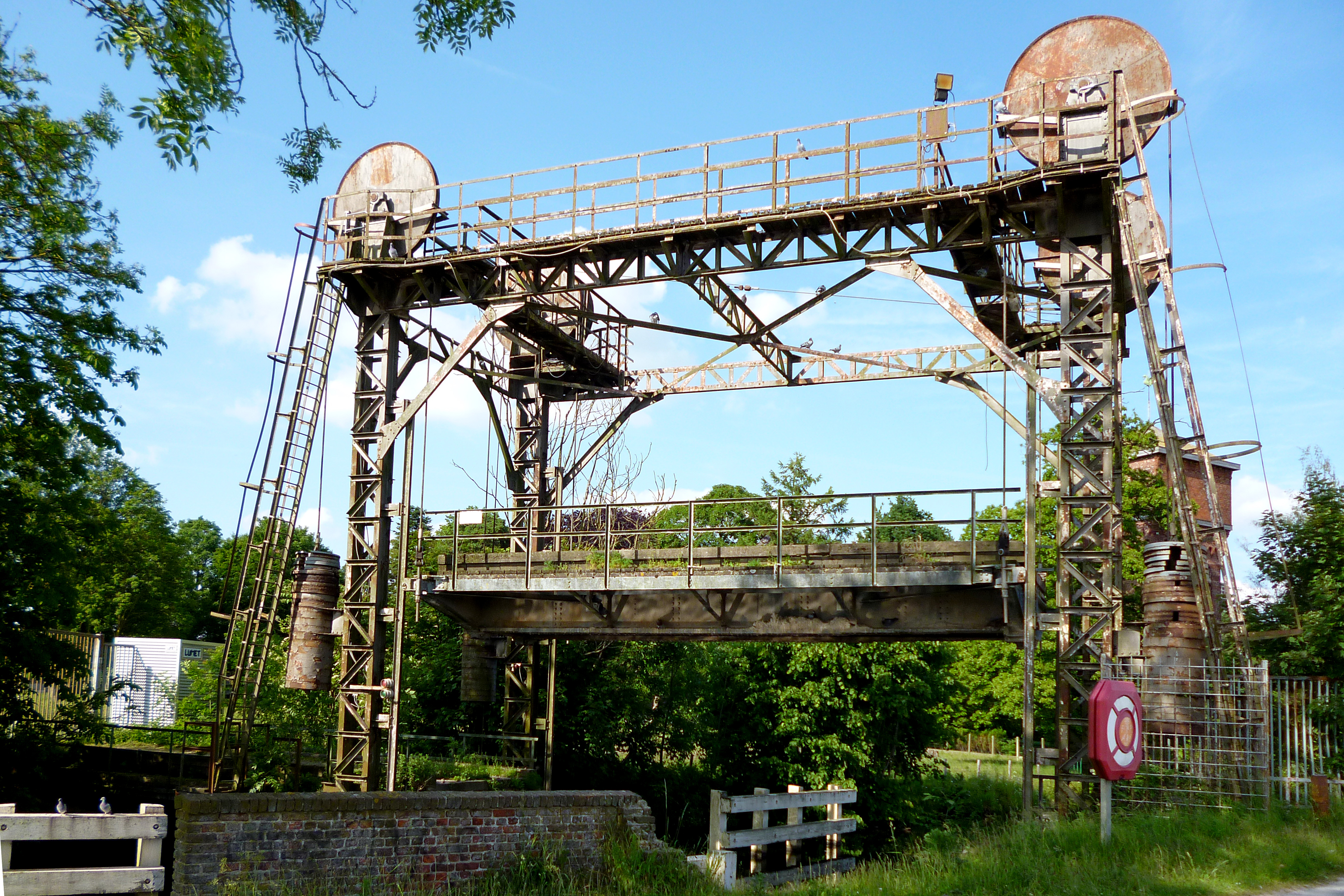
Vapeurbrug over the Moervaart

The location of the sugar factory was favorable. The land in the area was very suitable to grow sugar beet. In the 1860s, a sugar factory was profitable if it could process 8-9000 t of beet per campaign. For this about 300 hectares of land were required. Contracting with farmers was not easy, because they often did not know how to grow the beet, but were aware that it could exhaust the ground. In such circumstances, the fact that the Lippens family owned so much land in the immediate vicinity would have come in handy to ensure a steady supply of beet.

Sugar beet from nearby fields could economically be brought to the factory by wagon or cart, but this was limited to a distance of no more than about 5–6 km. This distance increased when roads were paved.

The canal Moervaart runs from the Ghent–Terneuzen Canal to the Durme (a tributary of the Scheldt). In the 1870s, a good system of inland navigation allowed a company to bring in sugar beet from dozens of kilometers away. For Moerbeke, it was e.g. possible to economically contract for beets from Zeelandic Flanders.

A railway from Zelzate to Moerbeke, part of the Belgian railway line 26 had opened in 1867. From the south came the Belgian railway line 77A from Lokeren, which also opened in 1867. This railway crossed the Vapeurbrug over the Moervaart. The factory was located on the north west side of this crossing, so beet could be unloaded from trains and boats directly onto the factory grounds.

== Sucrerie de Moerbeke (1893-1914) ==
The public company Naamloze vennootschap Sucrerie de Moerbeke was founded when the partnership that owned the factory was about to end. The new company would start on 1 August 1893 and have a share capital of 1,000,000 francs divided in 1,000 franc shares. The management (administrateurs) was done by Léon Leirens, Hippolyte Lippens, Jules de Cock, Emile Halot and Eugène Lippens. Victor van der Haeghen and Théophile de Keyser were supervisors. The shareholders were:

- Mr. Jules de Cock 25 shares
- Mrs. Jules de Cock 25 shares
- The heirs of widow Pierre van Remoortere de Naeyere 100 shares
- The widow of Dominique Soenen 100 shares
- Théophile de Keyser 25 shares
- The heirs of Eugène van der Haeghen 25 shares
- Ms. Louise van der Haeghen 25 shares
- Emile Halot 50 shares
- Mrs. Mortureux-Huser 25 shares
- Eugène Lippens 25 shares
- Victor de Hoon-Hesnault 25 shares
- Vicor van der Haeghen-Hesnault 25 shares
- Auguste Claus van der Haeghen-Hesnault 25 shares
- Jules Claus van der Haeghen-Hesnault 25 shares
- Heirs of N.A. Claus van der Haeghen-Hesnault 75 shares
- Ms. Amélie van den Berghen 50 shares
- Alfred de Vos 50 shares
- Four members of the Halot family 25 shares
- Countess De Kerchove de Denterghem de Limon 25 shares
- Mrs Hippolyte de Kerchove-Lippens 100 shares
- Heirs of A.M. Lippens 125 shares
- Jules Halot 25 shares

=== Refining activities ===
In 1913, the factory was expanded in order to produce white sugar instead of raw sugar. Up till then, it had produced raw sugar, which had to be refined by a sugar refinery before it could be sold to consumers. After the changes, the factory produced sugar that was so pure that it could be sold directly to consumers and manufacturers. Engineer Paul Lippens was instrumental in this change.

=== Zeeuwsch-Vlaamsche Tramweg Maatschappij ===
In June 1911 the Zeeuwsch-Vlaamsche Tramweg Maatschappij was founded in Terneuzen. It planned to connect the western and eastern parts of Zeelandic Flanders, but also wanted to ease transport of sugar beet. The management had two members of the Lippens family, but also representatives from the Wittouck factory in Zelzate. Sucrerie de Moerbeke participated, and so in 1916 the Drieschouwen–Moerbeke Line was opened. The line primarily served to transport sugar beet to Moerbeke, but it also transported passengers for while. The line was closed down in 1949.

== Sucrerie et Raffinerie de Moerbeke (1914-1929) ==
=== Concentration in the sugar industry ===
On 27 March 1914, the Sucrerie et Raffinerie de Moerbeke was founded. As the share capital of the new company was increased, the Lippens family became a majority shareholder.

In Zelzate, there were three sugar factories in 1878, those of L. Tydgadt & Co; Félix Wittouck; and J. and O. Mechelynck. In 1915 the factory of director-owner Tytgadt still existed. Soon after, it had become a child company or simple production location of the Sucrerie et Raffinerie de Moerbeke.

== Suikerfabrieken van Vlaanderen (1929-1989) ==
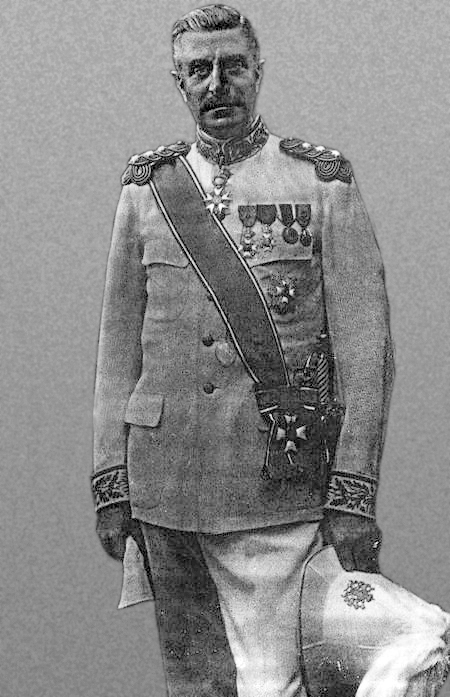
Maurice Auguste Lippens (1875 – 1956)

In 1929 the Suikerfabrieken van Vlaanderen / Sucreries de Flandres was formed by a merger of: the Sucrerie et Raffinerie de Moerbeke-Waes; the Sucrerie Frantz Wittouck in Selzate; and the Sucrerie de l'Espérance in Snaaskerke.

Also in 1929 the holding Société Financière des Sucres, Finasucre was formed. The holding was dominated by the Lippens family, which brought in its shares in the companies that had been merged, but also the Escanaffles Sugar Factory.

The Suikerfabrieken van Vlaanderen had its offices in Moerbeke. The shares in Suikerfabrieken van Vlaanderen were divided equally between Finasucre and Raffinerie Tirlemontoise. In turn, Finasucre had a stake in Raffinerie Tirlemontoise.

The late 1920s crisis in the sugar industry hit the Suikerfabrieken van Vlaanderen very hard. In early 1931, the Wittouck factory in Zelzate was closed down. It was even considered to also close down Moerbeke Sugar Factory.

In 1935 Centrale Suiker Maatschappij sold its factory Sucrerie et Raffinerie de Lillo to Suikerfabrieken van Vlaanderen. It was demolished almost immediately.

== Suikergroep (1989-2003) ==
In 1982 Finasucre acquired the rest of the shares in the Moerbeke Sugar Factory / Suikerfabrieken van Vlaanderen. This was brought about by trading its share in Raffinerie Tirlemontoise for RT's share in Suikerfabrieken van Vlaanderen. In 1989 Suikergroep / Groupe Sucrier was formed by the merger of the Moerbeke Sugar Factory, the Frasnes Sugar Factory, and Sogesucre.

== Iscal Sugar (2003-2007) ==
Iscal Sugar was founded as a new company in 2003. It got Moerbeke Sugar Factory and Frasnes Sugar Factory from the Suikergroep. Others brought in Fontenoy Sugar Factory (1992), and Veurne Sugar Factory (1922). The Suikergroep now became a (majority) shareholder in Iscal Sugar.

Within five years from 2003, Iscal Sugar would close down three of its four sugar factories. Moerbeke Sugar Factory closed down as the last of these three factories. Its closure had everything to do with the end of the Sugar quota system of the European Common Market Organization for Sugar. In order to smoothen the transition to an open market, the EU organized the 2006/2010 restructuring program for companies that were willing to end their sugar production.

The 2007 closure came as a surprise to many, but was explained by its location. The best area for sugar beet near the factory was between Kieldrecht and Watervliet, but this was only 1,500 hectares. At the time, most sugar beet processed in Moerbeke came from areas near Veurne, Poperinge and Oudenaarde. Therefore, Fontenoy Sugar Factory was in a more suitable location. Others noted that Iscal got EUR 53.7 million for the closure. On 26 December 2007 the closure of the factory was announced, 95 people lost their jobs.

== Legacy ==
=== Demolishment ===
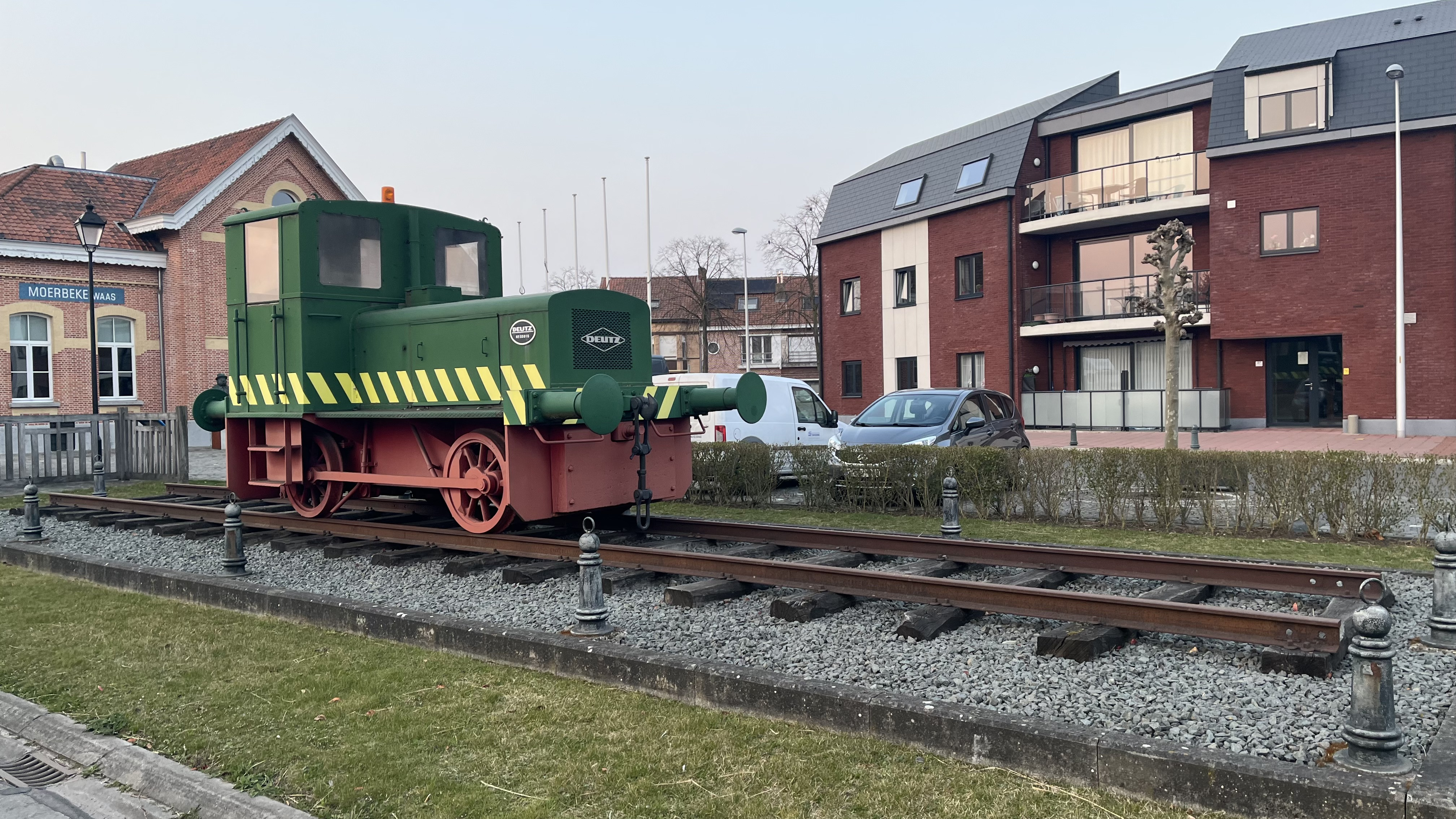
Diesel switcher near the station

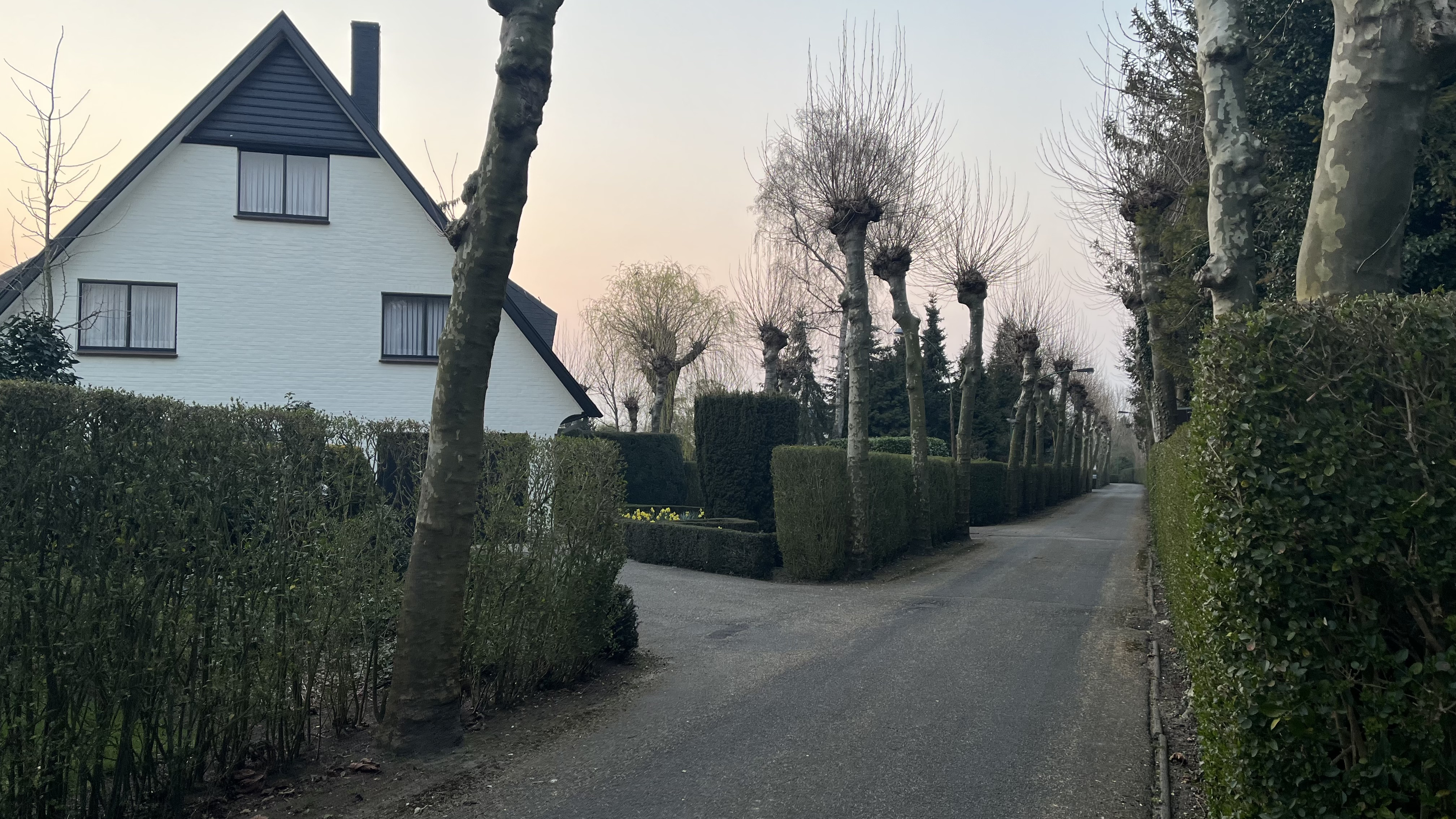
The Siroopdreef with houses for the factory's engineers

The demolishment of the factory complex started one and a half year after its closure. The works lasted till the Summer of 2010.

=== Sights ===
The railways remained in use with the factory till it was demolished. The station of Moerbeke is now the municipal library. On a small section of track that was left near the station stands a Deutz 55815 Switcher locomotive from 1954. The railway bridge Vapeurbrug over the Moervaart is a monument. Part of railway line 77 is now a bicycle path to Stekene and Sint-Gillis-Waas.

The Moervaart is now only relevant for recreational use.

== Sources ==
- "Onroerend erfgoed Vlaanderen: Suikergroep N.V.".
- Valcke, Tony (2003), "Maurice Lippens", De Fonteinen van de Oranjeberg, vol. IV Biografiën van twintigste-eeuwse beleidsmakers, Academia Press Gent & Provincie Oost-Vlaanderen, pp. 3–20, ISBN 9789038204826
- Le Moniteur Belge, vol. Annêe 1869, Imprimerie de Moniteur Belge, Brussels, 1869
- Maes, Godfried (2004), De politieke geschiedenis van Moerbeke-Waas. Meer dan 150 jaar liberaal bestuur, Academia Press Gent & Provincie Oost-Vlaanderen
- Jurisprudence commerciale des Flandres et des tribunaux de commerce belges. Librairie Générale de Ad. Hoste, Gand. 1893.
- Inventaris van het archief van de familie Lippens en aanverwante families, 1323-1968. Rijksarchief in België. 2015.
- Bakker, Martijn (1989). Ondernemerschap en vernieuwing. Eindhoven University of Technology. doi:10.6100/IR297656.
- Liste générale des fabriques de sucre, vol. Campagne 1877–78, Bureaux du Journal des Fabricants de Sucre, 1878
- "Les Allemands s'emparent d'une usine a Selzaete". Le Vingtième Siècle. 4 August 1915.
- "Uit de Belgische suikerindustrie". Nieuwe Rotterdamsche Courant. 22 July 1929.
- "Suikerfabriek Wittouck". Algemeen Handelsblad. 23 April 1931.
- "Suikergroep gaat rendabiliteit opvijzelen en groeien". De Tijd. 9 March 1989.
- "The Iscal group". Iscal Sugar.
- "Robert Van Gaever - Iscal Sugar". Vilt. 29 December 2008.
- "Reorganisatie-voorstelllen der Centrale Suiker Mij". De Telegraaf. 9 May 1935.
- Belet, Ivo (2008-02-15). "Parlementaire vraag: Sluiting suikerfabriek Iscal in Moerbeke-Waas (België)" (in Dutch).
- "95 banen weg na sluiting suikerfabriek Moerbeke". 26 December 2007.
- Knuyens (12 June 2009). "Beton suikerfabriek dient voor fundering brug".
- "Masterplan Suikerfabrieksite en Omgeving Moerbeke" (PDF).
- Moerbeke. "Vapeurbrug".
- "Financieel Berichten". Het Nieuws van den Dag. 24 June 1911.
