= Maurice Lippens =

Maurice Lippens may refer to:

- Maurice Lippens (politician) (1875–1956), politician and former governor-general of Belgian Congo
- Maurice Lippens (businessman) (born 1943), Belgian businessman, grandson of the governor-general of the same name
