= Maurice Lippens (businessman) =

Belgian businessman and banker (born 1943)

The Count Lippens
- Born: 9 May 1943 (age 83); Knokke, Belgium
- Other name: Uncle Maurice
- Occupation: Businessman
- Known for: Chairman of Fortis

Maurice Robert Josse Marie Ghislain, Count Lippens (born 9 May 1943 in Knokke, Belgium) is a Belgian businessman and banker. Born to Léon Lippens and Suzanne Lippens, he is the grandson of Maurice Lippens (1875) and brother of Leopold Lippens, mayor of Knokke-Heist.

== Education ==
Maurice Lippens obtained a doctorate in law from the Universite Libre de Bruxelles (ULB) (Brussels) in 1967, and an MBA degree from the Harvard Business School in 1972.

== Career ==
Maurice Lippens started his professional career in South Africa to assist with the reorganisation of the Maatschappij voor Zeevisserij where he stayed for five months, and then served his military service duties in the Belgian army.

Afterwards, he went through an apprenticeship at the Banque de Paris et des Pays-Bas (financial analysis), followed by the Générale de Banque in financial management. After he graduated from Harvard Business School (MBA), he held management positions at Scienta S.A., the Société Européenne de Venture Capital. He then took over a company in Brussels on his own account, which was resold in 1979.

Maurice Lippens joined the AG Group in 1981, in 1983, he became managing director, and then Chairman / Managing Director in 1988. He has been the Chairman of Fortis since 1990, participating to the creation of the group. In 2000, he became chairman of the executive committee of Fortis. In 2004, he became the sole President of the group.

Mr Lippens was relieved of his position after a government bailout of the bank on 28 September 2008. He has been involved in numerous law suits and was accused of calling for private investors to buy more Fortis shares in June 2008. In 2009, he still owned his shares (920,000 shares) of Fortis. In 2012, a Dutch court cleared Maurice Lippens for the misleading financial information published by Fortis in May–June 2008. In 2018, the Belgian justice dropped charges against seven ex-directors of Fortis, including Maurice Lippens, considering that they could not have foreseen the subprime mortgage crisis.

After leaving Fortis in 2008, he lived off his family's real estate company.

== Other positions ==
- Director Total
- Director GBL (Group Bruxelles Lambert)
- Director Belgacom
- Director Suez-Tractebel
- 1983-...: President of Companie Het Zoute
- Director Iscal Sugar
- Director Finasucre
- Director Groupe Sucrier
- Member Trilateral Commission
- Member Harvard Business School European Advisory Council
- Member Insead Belgium Council
- Member of the Belgian businessclub Cercle de Lorraine.

== Awards ==
2004: Grand Officer of the Order of Léopold II
