= Iscal Sugar =

Belgian sugar production company

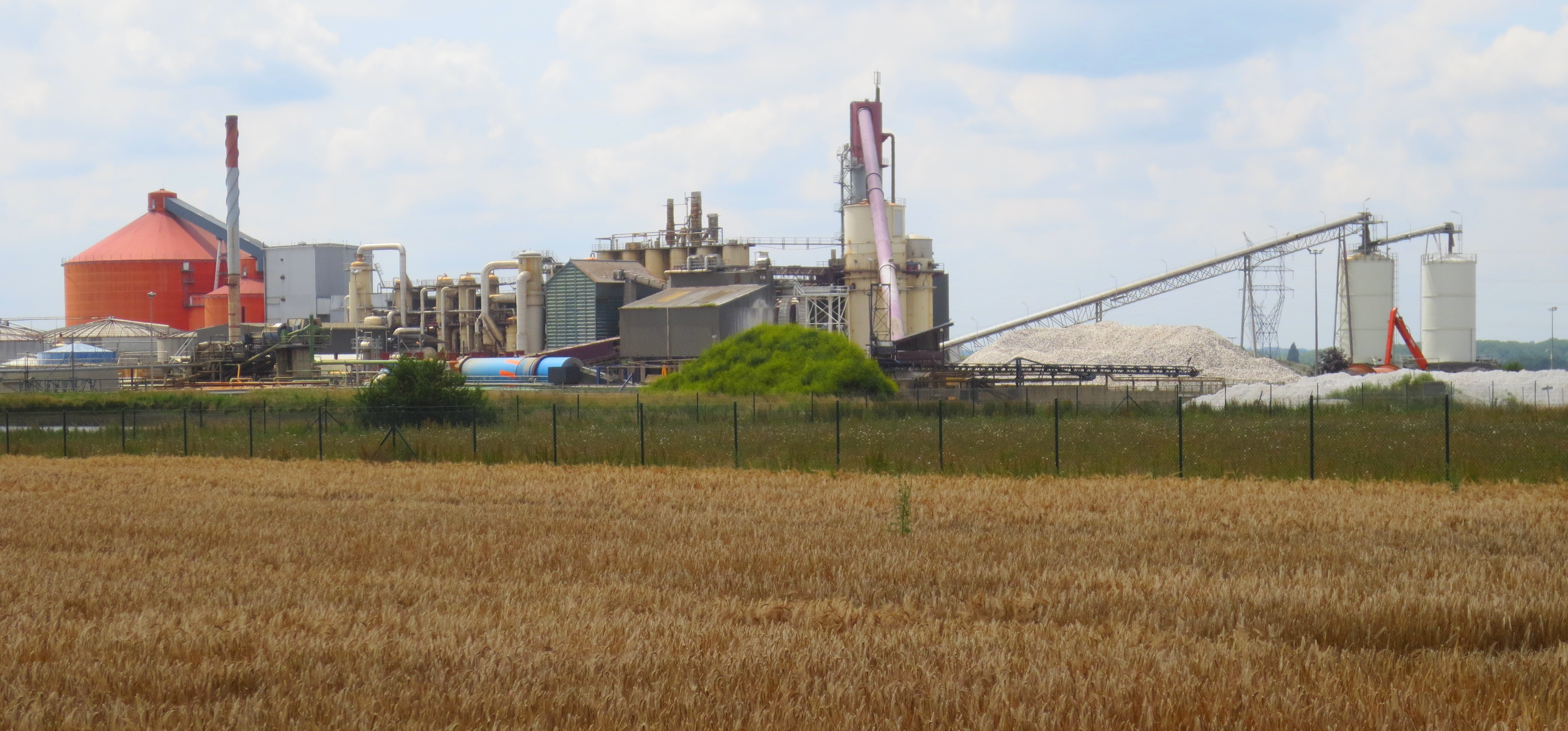
- Fontenoy Sugar Factory in 2016
- Industry: Sugar production
- Predecessor: Moerbeke, Frasnes, Fontenoy, and Veurne sugar factories.
- Founded: 2003
- Headquarters: Fontenoy, Belgium
- Products: White sugar
- Number of employees: 170
- Website: https://iscal.be

Iscal Sugar is a sugar producing company in Belgium. It was created in 2003 after multiple earlier mergers of sugar factories. After further reorganizations, Fontenoy Sugar Factory is now Iscal's only sugar factory, but this is again increasing production.

== Structure ==
Iscal Sugar has three sites in the Benelux:

- Fontenoy Sugar Factory in Fontenoy, Antoing which also hosts the group's headquarters.
- Iscal Frasnes, which is the former Frasnes Sugar Factory in Frasnes. Its sugar silo of 50,000 t and storage facilities are still in use. The site also produces powdered sugar.
- Alldra in Almelo Netherlands, which produces decorative sugar toppings.

The holding company Finasucre on Rue de la Gare In Brussels owns the majority of the shares of Iscal Sugar. In turn, the holding is almost 100% owned by the Lippens family, connected to the former Moerbeke Sugar Factory. This holding also owns sugar companies in the Democratic Republic of Congo (DRC) and Australia. Its daughter Galactic produces lactic acid and products derived from it. Other interests of Finasucre are in Macadamia plantations, brick, sugar installations etc. In 2021 Finasucre held 87.6% of the shares in Iscal Sugar.

== History ==
=== Name ===
The name Iscal is a concatenation of Isera and Scaldis, the Latin names for the rivers Yser and the Scheldt. The basins of these rivers used to form the area that supplied sugar beet to the factories that merged into the group in 2003, in particular those in Fontenoy, Antoing and Veurne.

=== Predecessors ===
The oldest predecessor of Iscal Sugar was the Moerbeke Sugar Factory in Moerbeke, which was founded in 1869.

In 1929 the holding Finasucre, a family-owned holding company with stakes in the Moerbeke and Escanaffles sugar factories was founded.

In the 1980s, Finasucre rapidly expanded in the sugar industry. In 1982 it acquired the rest of the shares in the Moerbeke Sugar Factory. In 1986 Finasucre acquired Sogesucre (owner of Compagnie sucrière Kwilu-Ngongo), and in 1988 it acquired the Frasnes Sugar Factory.

=== Formation of Groupe Sucrier / Suikergroep ===
In 1989 the Groupe Sucrier / Suikergroep was formed by the merger of the Moerbeke Sugar Factory, the Frasnes Sugar Factory, and Sogesucre.

In 1990 the Escanaffles Sugar Factory was closed down. In 1994 it became the home of a lactic acid production site owned by Galactic.

In 2003 the Euro Star factory in Lelystad, the Netherlands was acquired. It became Iscal Sugar Retail.

=== Iscal Sugar (2003) ===
Iscal Sugar was created in 2003 by the merger of Groupe Sucrier with Veurne Sugar Factory (1922) and Fontenoy Sugar Factory (1992).

In 2008 the shareholders of Iscal Sugar were:

- 71.5% Groupe Sucrier
- 16.3% Sucrerie Couplet
- 7.6% Agri Investment Fund of the Boerenbond (part Warcoing Sucre's shares)
- 5% Beet cultivators

The new company faced a very tough time during the restructuring of the European sugar industry, which was at the time regulated by production quotas. In 2004 the Frasnes Sugar Factory was closed down and transformed into a packaging and storage site. In 2006 the Veurne Sugar Factory had to be closed down, but even this was not enough. The first European attempts to restructure beet sugar production failed to achieve enough, and so the European Community spent more money to reduce production. Iscal then agreed to close down the Moerbeke Sugar Factory in 2008. This left Iscal with only one sugar factory, but also allowed it to concentrate in the area where it was most profitable to grow sugar beet.

In September 2010 Sucrerie Couplet sold its shares in Iscal Sugar.

In 2012 Finasucre acquired the minority shares in Groupe Sucrier. The move was followed by a simplified merger by absorption of Groupe Sucrier in Finasucre.

In 2016 Alldra was bought.

In 2017 the European regulation with production quotas was ended.

In 2019 CEO Olivier Lippens was succeeded by Jérôme Lippens.

By 2021 the Fontenoy Sugar Factory was producing about 200,000 t of sugar per year, but the factory only had silos for 6,000 t and 40,000 t. This often forced Iscal to sell sugar, just because the storage silos were full. Iscal therefore decided to build a new Sugar Silo with a height of 64 m, a diameter of 51 m and a capacity of 80,000 t.

In 2022 Robert Torck became CEO of Iscal Sugar.
