= Compagnie sucrière Kwilu-Ngongo =

Sugar factory in the Democratic Republic of the Congo

Coordinates: 05°30′36″S 14°42′16″E

Sucrerie du Kwilu Ngongo
- Company type: Public Private Partnership
- Industry: Manufacture & Marketing of Sugar
- Founded: 1925; 101 years ago
- Headquarters: Kwilu Ngongo, Kongo Central, Democratic Republic of the Congo
- Products: Sugar (63,400 tons) in 2019; Rum (53,000 hectolitres (1,200,000 imp gal; 1,400,000 US gal) in 2019
- Number of employees: Permanent: 1,485, Seasonal: 802, Total: 2,287 (2019)

Sucrerie du Kwilu Ngongo is a sugar manufacturing company in the Democratic Republic of the Congo. The sugar mill produces crystalline table sugar and maintains a distillery that manufactures rum under the brand Kwilu Rum. It is the oldest sugar mill in the country, having been established in 1925.

== Location ==
The headquarters of the company and its main factory are located in the town of Kwilu Ngongo, in Kongo Central Province (formerly Bas Zaire Province), in the southwestern part of DR Congo, close to the international order with Angola. This is approximately 180 kilometres (112 mi), by road, northeast of the port city of Matadi, where the provincial headquarters are located.

Kwilu Ngongo is located about 179 kilometres (111 mi), by road, southwest of the country's capital city, Kinshasa. The geographical coordinates of Kwilu Ngongo Sugar Refinery are: 05°30'36.0"S, 14°42'16.0"E (Latitude:-5.510000; Longitude:14.704444).

== Overview ==
The sugar factory which was established in 1925, is the oldest sugar mill in the Democratic Republic of the Congo. It is also the largest, by sugar output, contributing 63,400 metric tons of finished product annually in 1990. At that time, it accounted for 66 percent of the county's domestic sugar output, on an annual basis. Between 1996 and 2021, it was the only functional sugar manufacturer in the county as both Lotokila Sugar Refinery and South Kivu Sugar Refinery were shut down.

As of 2019, KNSR had 11,688 hectares (28,880 acres) of cane under cultivation. Each 1 hectare (2.5 acres) yielded 70 tons of raw cane on average. The refinery had crushing capacity of 5,500 tons of raw cane per day. At that time sugar production was 69,811 tons annually.

== Ownership ==
The sugar refinery and embedded alcohol distillery are co-owned by the Government of the Democratic Republic of the Congo and a private conglomerate known as Finasucre, based in Belgium, with operations globally. The two shareholders established a special purpose joint venture company called Compagnie Sucrière Kwilu Ngongo, which owns and operates the business. The table below illustrates the shareholding in the stock of Compagnie Sucrière Kwilu Ngongo.

Compagnie Sucrière Kwilu Ngongo Stock Ownership
Rank	Name of Owner	Domicile	Ownership
1	Finasucre	Belgium	60.0
2	Government of the DRC	DR Congo	40.0
	Total		100.00

== Kwilu Ngongo Distillery ==
Embedded within the sugar refinery is the Kwilu Ngongo Distillery, which produces Kwilu Rum. The distillery is owned and operated by the sugar mill. It has daily production capacity of 375 hectolitres (8,200 imp gal; 9,900 US gal) with annual output of 53,000 hectolitres (1,200,000 imp gal; 1,400,000 US gal).

== See also ==
- Economy of the Democratic Republic of the Congo
- List of sugar manufacturers in the Democratic Republic of the Congo
