= Thomas Baker (aviator) =

Australian soldier, aviator and flying ace of the First World War

Thomas Charles Richmond Baker
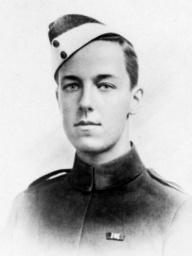
- Thomas Baker as a cadet pilot c.1917
- Born: 2 May 1897; Smithfield, South Australia
- Died: 4 November 1918 (aged 21) near Leuze, France
- Burial place: Escanaffles Communal Cemetery
- Military career
- Allegiance: Australia
- Branch: Australian Army; Australian Flying Corps
- Service years: 1914–1918
- Rank: Captain
- Units: 16th Battery, 6th Field Artillery Brigade (1915–17); No. 4 Squadron AFC (1918)
- Conflicts: First World War; Western Front; Battle of the Somme; Battle of Messines; Hundred Days Offensive †
- Awards: Distinguished Flying Cross; Military Medal & Bar

Thomas Charles Richmond Baker, DFC, MM & Bar (2 May 1897 – 4 November 1918) was an Australian soldier, aviator, and flying ace of the First World War. Born in Smithfield, South Australia, he was an active sportsman in his youth and developed a keen interest in aviation. He was employed as a clerk with the Bank of New South Wales, before he enlisted in the Australian Imperial Force in July 1915, for service in World War I. Posted to an artillery unit on the Western Front, he was awarded the Military Medal for carrying out numerous repairs on a communications line while subject to severe artillery fire. In June 1917, Baker was awarded a bar to his decoration for his part in quelling a fire in one of the artillery gun pits that was endangering approximately 300 rounds of shrapnel and high explosive.

In September 1917, Baker applied for a position as a mechanic in the Australian Flying Corps. He was instead selected for flight training, and was posted to courses in the United Kingdom. He graduated as a pilot and was commissioned a second lieutenant in March 1918. Posted for active duty in France that June, Baker joined the ranks of No. 4 Squadron AFC. Over the next four months, he rose to the rank of captain and was credited with bringing down 12 German aircraft. He was shot down and killed on 4 November 1918. In February 1919, he was posthumously awarded the Distinguished Flying Cross.

== Early life ==
Thomas Charles Richmond Baker was born in Smithfield, South Australia, on 2 May 1897, the eldest son of Richmond Baker, a schoolmaster and farmer, and his wife Annie Martha (née Gardner). He was educated at St Peter's College in Adelaide. During his school years Baker was an active sportsman, taking part in rowing, tennis and football, in addition to being a member of the cadet corps. In his youth, he acquired an avid interest in aviation, and the construction of model aeroplanes became "his chief hobby". Graduating from secondary school in 1914, he gained employment as a clerk with the Adelaide branch of the Bank of New South Wales. During this time, he joined the 11th Royal Australian Engineers of the Citizens Military Force.

== First World War ==
=== Australian Imperial Force ===
On 29 July 1915, Baker enlisted in the Australian Imperial Force for service during the First World War. Allocated as a reinforcement to the 6th Field Artillery Brigade with the rank of gunner, he embarked from Melbourne aboard HMAT Persic on 22 November, bound for Egypt. On arrival, Baker was posted to the 16th Battery before moving to France for service on the Western Front. Disembarking in France on 1 July 1916, Baker took part in the Somme offensive.

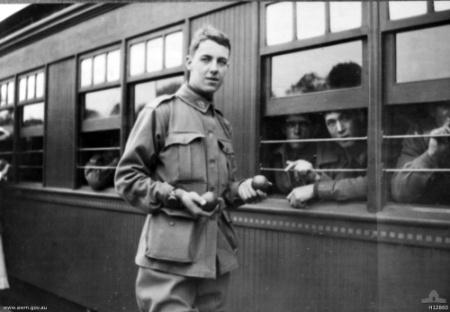
Gunner Thomas Baker about to board a train from South Australia to Victoria for further military training

On 11 December 1916, Baker was engaged in battle with his unit near Gueudecourt. During the action, he was posted as a telephonist with the forward observation team sent to record the fall of the artillery and secure the range for a bombardment. Their position during this time was on a forward slope of the Australian frontline, which was subject to constant observation and the attention of German snipers. Attempting to maintain communications, Baker ventured out on four occasions during the engagement, each time subject to the heavy artillery barrage from the German forces, and repaired the telephone line in thirty separate places. As a consequence, the 16th Battery was able to align its artillery barrage and destroy the Germans' forward trench. Commended for his "great gallantry" as well as "good service and ... great devotion to duty", Baker was awarded the Military Medal. The announcement for the decoration was published in a supplement to The London Gazette on 19 February 1917.

In 1917, the 16th Battery was relocated to the Messines sector of the frontline in Belgium. On 16 March, Baker was admitted to hospital suffering from an illness; he returned to his unit six days later. During the afternoon of 21 June, the unit's position was subject to a severe bombardment of artillery shelling, resulting in an order for all men to evacuate the gun pits and seek cover. As a consequence of the barrage, the camouflage covering one of the gun pits caught fire, endangering approximately 300 rounds of shrapnel and high explosives. The battery sergeant major immediately called for men to assist him in quelling the blaze; Baker and three others volunteered. Despite the continuous shellfire, the four men promptly set about retrieving water from a nearby well and shellholes with buckets "at great personal risk", dousing the fire. The camouflage had been completely destroyed, several sand bags had caught fire, and a few rounds of ammunition were charred. As a result of their actions, Baker's three companions were recommended for the Military Medal, and Baker for a bar to his. The announcement of the decorations was promogulated in a supplement to the London Gazette on 21 August 1917.

=== Australian Flying Corps ===
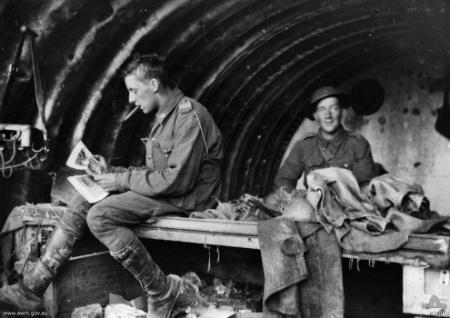
Gunners Baker and Harrison of the 16th Battery relax in a dugout c. 1916

In September 1917, Baker followed his ambition of joining the Australian Flying Corps and applied for a transfer to become an air mechanic when the opportunity arose. His application proved successful, though he was instead selected to become a pilot and was posted for flight training. Embarking for the United Kingdom the following month, he was posted to No. 5 Training Squadron as a cadet pilot for his initial aviation instruction. On 27 March, Baker graduated as a pilot in the Australian Flying Corps and was commissioned as a second lieutenant; he had completed his first solo flight earlier that month. In May, he was posted for a course at No. 2 School of Aerial Fighting and Gunnery.

Baker proceeded overseas to France on 15 June 1918 and, on arrival the following day, was posted to No. 4 Squadron AFC piloting Sopwith Camels. On 23 June, he flew his first operational sortie over the German lines; he was promoted to lieutenant four days later. On 31 July, Baker was among a formation of seven Camels tasked with carrying out a patrol over German-held territory. The group crossed over into German lines near Nieppe Forrest, and flew towards Estaires. The Camels soon intercepted a formation of seven Fokker D.VIIs, and the entire patrol immediately dived at the German aircraft. In the ensuing melee, Baker managed to force one of the aircraft down to the ground, thus scoring his first aerial victory.

Throughout August 1918, No. 4 Squadron "maintained a high operational tempo" as the Allies launched a new offensive on the Western Front. On 7 August, Baker and two others took off from their squadron aerodrome at Reclinghem; all three machines were carrying a heavy load of bombs. Airborne over Pont-du-Hem, the trio released their bombs over German billets in the area, before spotting two Albatros D.Vs. The three Australians closed in on the two aircraft. Baker engaged an Albatros, his fire severing the left wing of the aircraft, effectively destroying the machine. Nine days later, a formation of 65 aircraft was assembled from No. 88 Squadron RAF, No. 92 Squadron RAF, No. 2 Squadron AFC and Baker's No. 4 Squadron AFC to execute a mass raid on the German aerodrome at Haubourdin. The fleet of aircraft was equipped with a range of incendiary and explosive bombs, in addition to machine gun ammunition. Led by Captain Harry Cobby, the aircraft from No. 4 Squadron were the first to sweep down and assault the target. At one point, Baker pursued a staff car until the vehicle ran up an embankment and flipped over. He later reported that "No one left the car". The raid, which was the largest aerial attack by Allied forces to that date, was highly successful; British estimates concluded that 37 German aeroplanes had been destroyed.

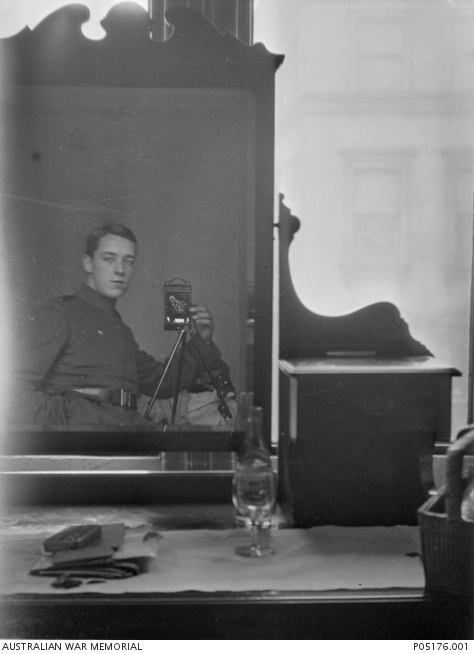
Self portrait of Thomas Baker taken with a Kodak camera using his reflection in a dresser mirror

On 19 August, Baker led a patrol of six aircraft over Lys. Five days later, he shot down a German balloon while on a lone mission in poor weather, scoring his third aerial victory. At dawn on 30 August, Baker took off on a sortie with Lieutenants Roy King and Oscar Ramsay. Over Laventie, the trio encountered three DFW C.Vs; Baker and King each disposed of one of the aircraft. Baker was granted two weeks' leave to the United Kingdom in early September. Towards the end of that month, No. 4 Squadron relocated to Serny and was soon after re-equipped with the Sopwith Snipe. By the time of the conversion, Baker had achieved flying ace status on the Sopwith Camel, having been credited with shooting down six German aircraft by early October.

Baker was promoted to temporary captain and made a flight commander in No. 4 Squadron on 24 October. Two days later, Baker and Lieutenant Thomas Barkell led a formation of nine Snipes. As the patrol drew near Tournai in the afternoon, they intercepted a group of 15 Fokker D.VIIs. The Snipes swept towards the German aircraft, and Baker attempted to engage the formation leader, but the machine guns on his Snipe jammed. He brought in his aircraft for a second attempt, and managed to shoot the Fokker down out of control. In all, the Australians destroyed five of the Fokkers before the engagement ended.

On 28 October, Baker was credited with the destruction of a further three German aircraft from two separate patrols into Belgium that day. During the second excursion, he brought one Fokker down out of control, before shooting the other down over Ath. He was airborne again on an offensive patrol the next day. Fifteen Snipes from No. 4 Squadron were detailed for the patrol, and as the party drew near Tournai they encountered approximately 60 Fokker planes already engaged with several British aircraft. Baker led five of the Snipes into the assault, but confusion reigned for several minutes before the men could gain their bearings in the fight. Baker assailed two Fokkers that had been pursuing another Snipe, and was able to destroy one of the aircraft. On 30 October, "considerable activity" was observed at the German aerodrome in Rebaix, and a formation of aircraft from No. 2 Squadron were detailed to bomb the area; an escort of eleven Snipes—including Baker—from No. 4 Squadron was provided. As the bombing was taking place, several Fokker aircraft appeared and were intercepted by the Snipes. In the ensuing battle, Baker critically damaged one of the Fokkers, resulting in the aircraft dropping towards the ground tail-first on its back. The Fokker proved to be Baker's twelfth, and final, aerial victory of the war; he had scored his last five victories in a period of three days.

On 4 November 1918, the whole of No. 80 Wing RAF—of which No. 4 Squadron was part—took to the sky in an effort to "harass the German retreat on the Leuze-Ath road" and to bomb the aerodrome to the east of Leuze. A formation of Sopwith Snipes from No. 4 Squadron had been utilised as an escort when the initial raid was carried out, and then to protect the bombers as they returned to the Allied lines. However, when the Australians had executed the latter duty, they were tailed by a patrol of twelve Fokkers. After seeing the bombers off, the Snipes wheeled around to confront the German aircraft. The battle raged for two or three minutes before dying out. As the Snipes re-grouped, they discovered that three pilots were missing; Baker was among the three. Baker and fellow ace Lieutenant Arthur Palliser were initially recorded as missing, but were later found to have fallen victim to Rittmeister Carl Bolle during the battle.

== Legacy ==
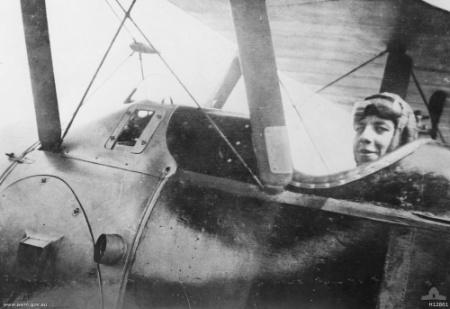
Captain Thomas Baker seated in the cockpit of a Sopwith Camel

Described as "the most gallant airman ... and ... a pilot far above the average" by one of the men in his squadron, Baker was buried in Escanaffles Communal Cemetery, Belgium. His aerial victories were broken down as seven aircraft and one balloon destroyed with an additional four planes driven down out of control, making him No. 4 Squadron's fourth highest scoring ace after Harry Cobby, Roy King and Edgar McCloughry. A stained-glass window at St John's Church of England in Adelaide is dedicated to his memory. On 8 February 1919, the London Gazette carried the posthumous announcement of the award of the Distinguished Flying Cross to Thomas Baker, reading:

Air Ministry, 8th February, 1919.

His Majesty the KING has been graciously pleased to confer the undermentioned Rewards on Officers and other ranks of the Royal Air Force in recognition of gallantry in flying operations against the enemy: —

[...]

AWARDED THE DISTINGUISHED FLYING CROSS.

[...]

Lieut. Thomas Charles Richmond Baker, M.M. (Australian F.C.). (FRANCE)

This officer has carried out some forty low flying raids on hostile troops, aerodromes, etc., and has taken part in numerous offensive patrols; he has, in addition, destroyed eight hostile machines. In all these operations he has shown exceptional initiative and dash, never hesitating to lead his formation against overwhelming odds, nor shrinking from incurring personal danger.
