= Fontenoy, Antoing =

Fontenoy
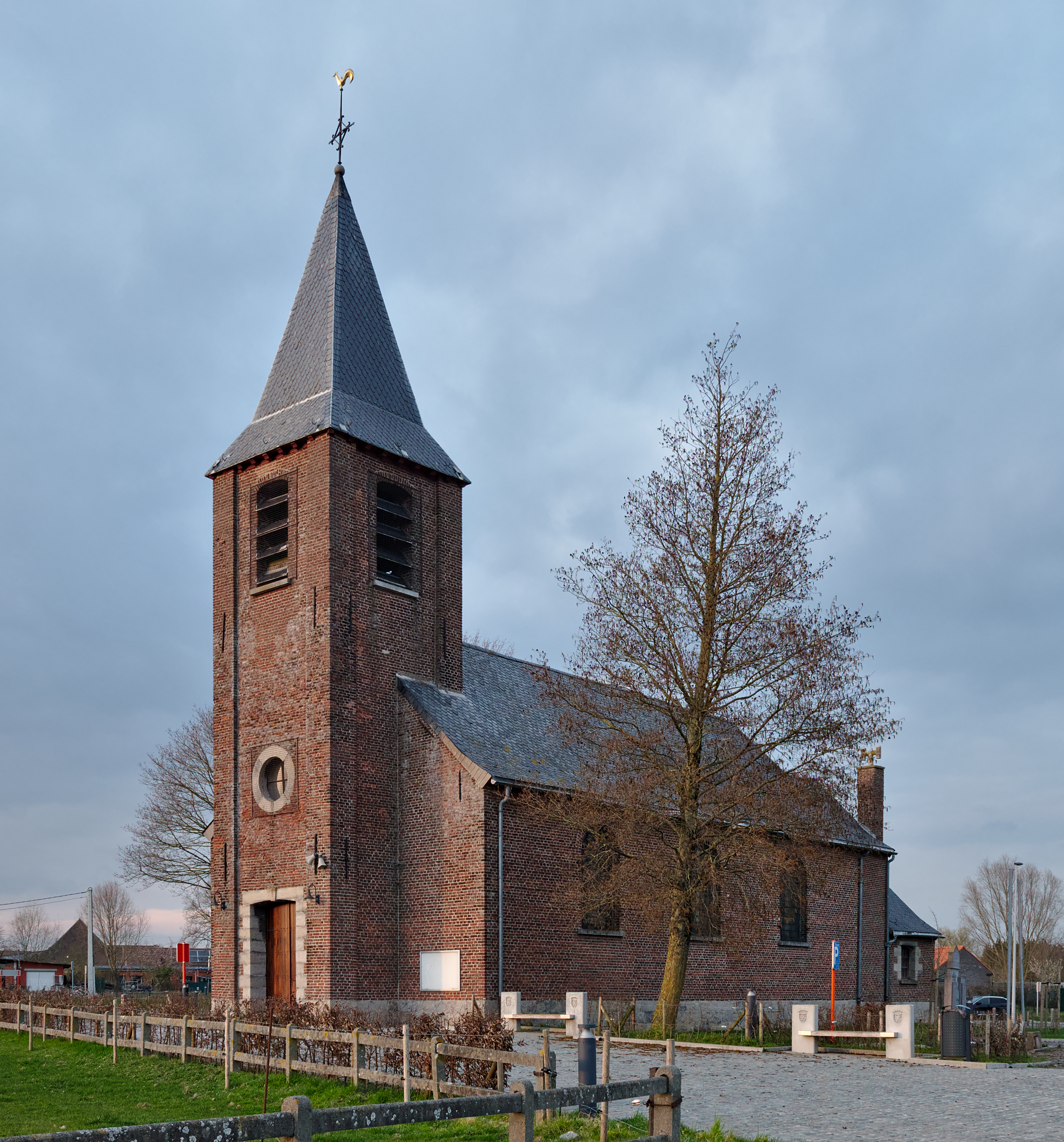
- Church of Fontenoy

- Location within Belgium Location within Europe
- Coordinates: 50.567780°N 3.473350°E
- Country: Belgium
- Region: Wallonia
- Province: Hainaut Province
- Municipality: Antoing

Fontenoy (French pronunciation: [fɔ̃t.nwa], fong't-n'wah) is a village in the Belgian municipality of Antoing, Hainaut Province. It is known for the 1745 Battle of Fontenoy and for its beet sugar factory.

== History ==
Fontenoy was mentioned as 'Fontineto' in 1189. It was part of the barony of Antoing, which depended on Leuze. In 1669 it was conquered by France, but returned to the Spanish Netherlands in 1678. In 1697 Fontenoy again became French, due to the Peace of Ryswick. In 1713 it was again returned to the Southern Netherlands.

On 11 May 1745 the major Battle of Fontenoy was fought near the village. It opened the way for the temporary occupation of the Austrian Netherlands by France. In 1992, during the construction of a new sugar factory on the battlefield, 60 skeletons were found. These had been buried in three layers on top of each other, and showed bullet holes. It was reported to be the first time that buried victims of the battle were found.

Until 1977, Fontenoy was a separate municipality. Its independence was ended by the Fusion of the Belgian municipalities, after which it became part of Antoing municipality.

== Today ==
The Fontenoy Sugar Factory was built on the Fontenoy battlefield in 1990–1993. By 1990 two companies that operated small sugar factories in nearby Wez-Velvain and Warcoing (Pecq) had decided on its construction. It is the most recent sugar factory of Western Europe. In 2003 it became part of Iscal Sugar. Due to its modern installations and good location, it was the only one of Iscal's four sugar factories that survived the restructuring of the European sugar market.

== Gallery ==
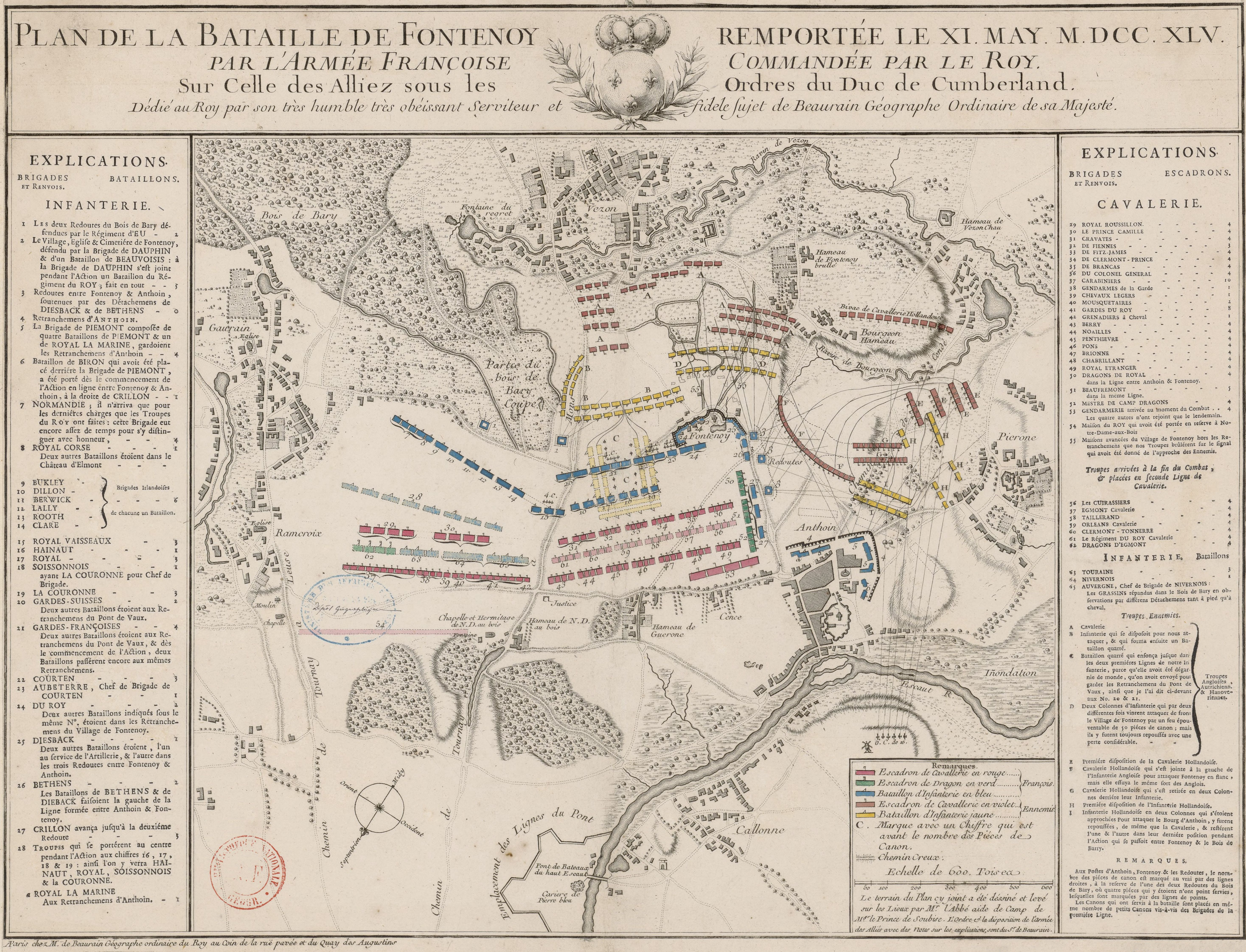
1745 battlefield map

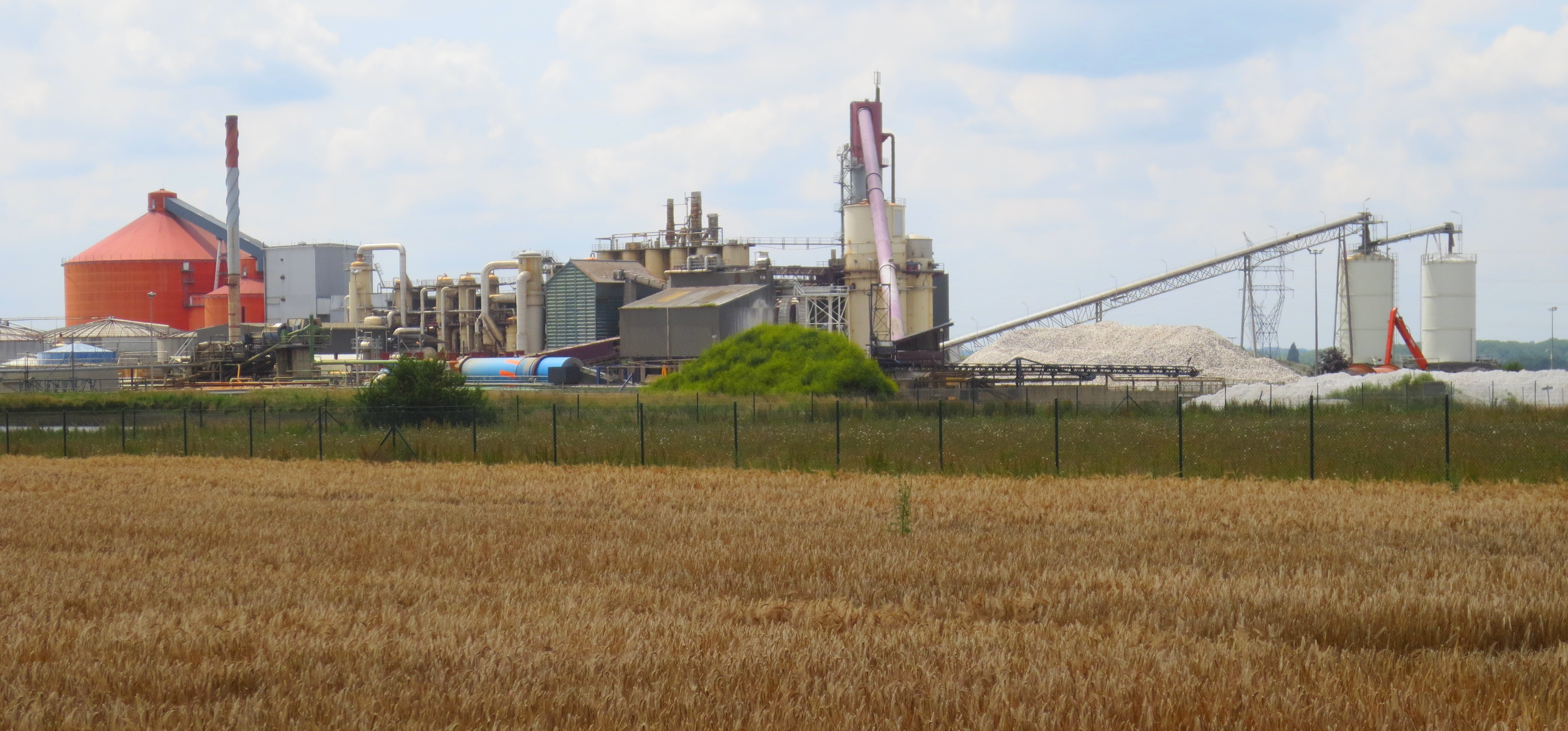
The beet sugar factory

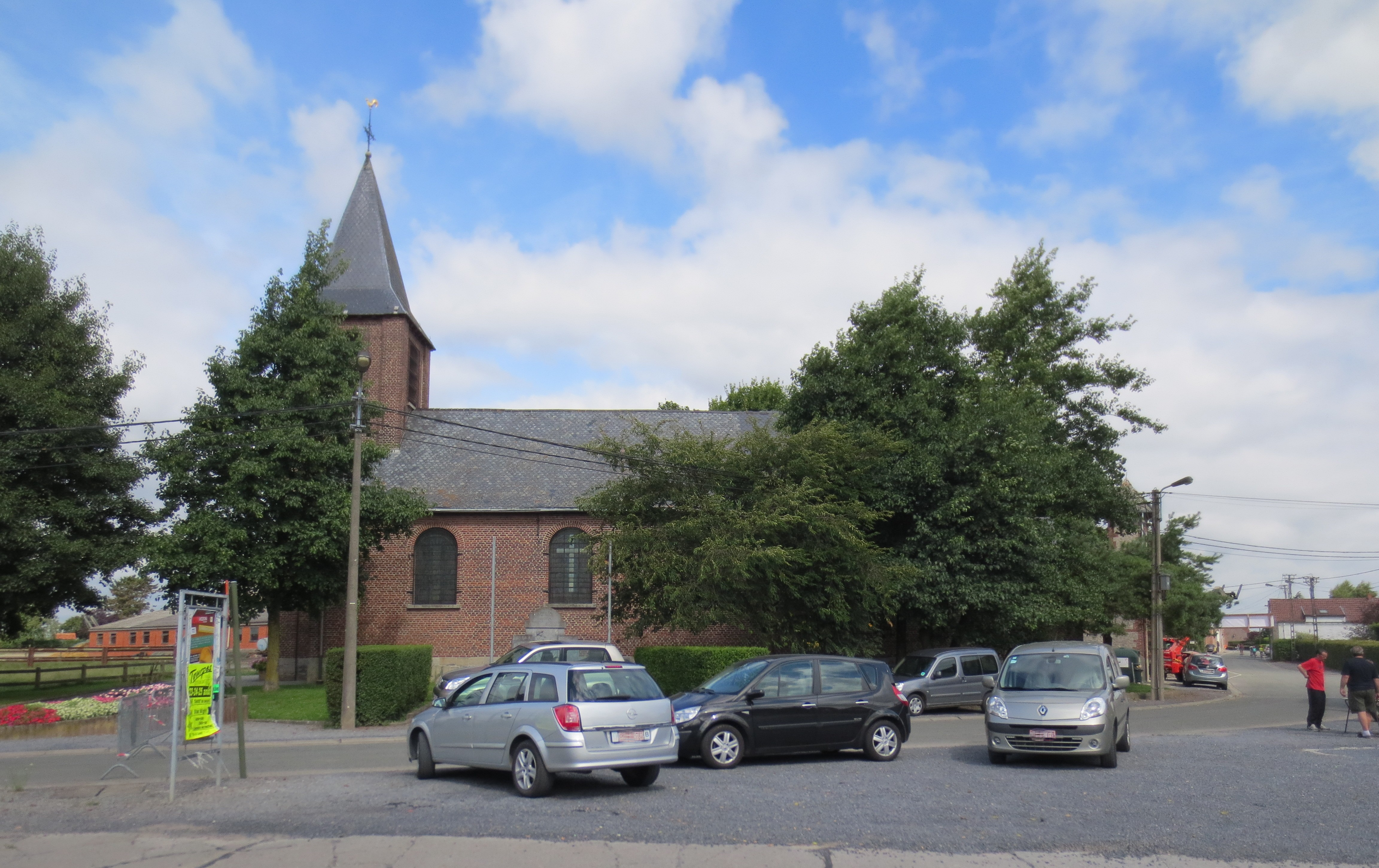
Village square

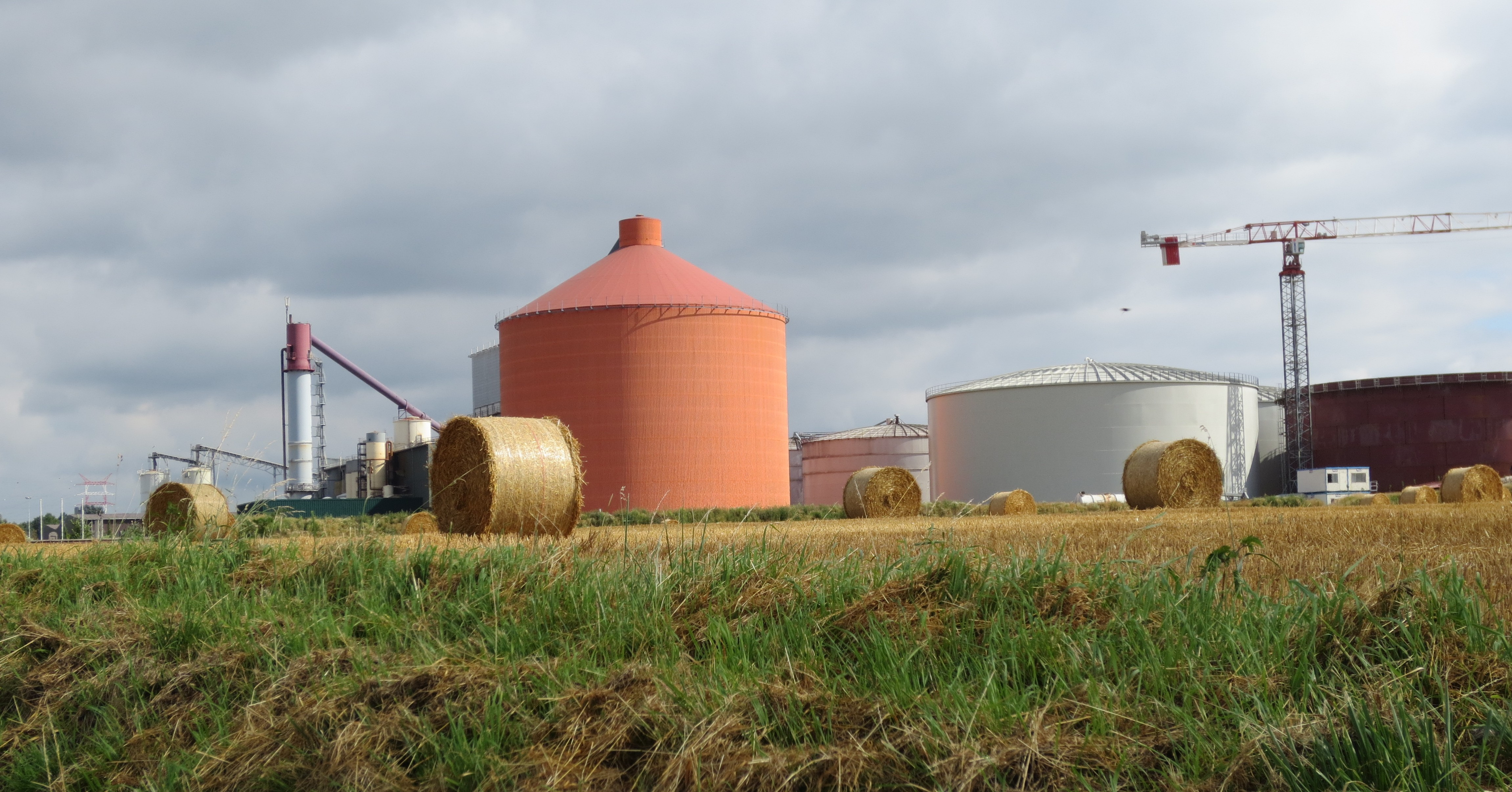
Fontenoy in Summer

== Sources ==
- Jespers, Jean_Jacques (2005), Dictionnaire des noms de lieux en Wallonie et à Bruxelles, Editions Racine, ISBN 9782873864095
- "Le Groupe Iscal", Iscal Sugar, 2023
- "Slachtoffers Slag bij Fontenoy (1745) opgegraven" [Victims of Battle of Fontenoy (1745) found]. De Telegraaf. 10 February 1992.
- "A new sugar factory in Fontenoy. There is strength in unity.", CAB Direct, 1990
