= Finasucre =

- Industry: Holding Company focused on agricultural industry
- Founded: 1929
- Headquarters: Brussel, Belgium
- Website: https://www.finasucre.com

Finasucre is a Belgian family holding company which is primarily active in the sugar industry. It is the second Belgian sugar company with its daughter Iscal Sugar, after Raffinerie Tirlemontoise. Finasucre is controlled by the Lippens family.

== Structure ==
Finasucre focuses on agricultural products, especially sugar and other products made from sugar beet. As a holding company, it is active through its daughter companies and participations:

- Bundaberg Sugar Ltd is an Australian 100% daughter of Finasucre. It has its own daughter companies, e.g. Bundaberg Walkers Engineering Ltd and Bundaberg Fresh Vegetables, which is active in the sweet potato business. In 2022 Bundaberg Sugar had a revenue of 220 million AUD, or about 132 million EUR. It had 347 employees.
- Iscal Sugar is a major producer of sugar from beet. It was created in 2003 by the merger of Groupe Sucrier / Suikergroep with Veurne Sugar Factory and Fontenoy Sugar Factory. Alldra B.V. in the Netherlands is a subsidiary of Iscal Sugar. It produces decorative sugar products, e.g. for ice creams. Finasucre owned 87.6% of Iscal Sugar in 2022. In 2022 Iscal had a revenue of 129 million EUR and 172 employees.
- Compagnie sucrière Kwilu-Ngongo in the Democratic Republic of the Congo is owned for 60% by Finasucre. It is not consolidated in the group. In 2022 it had turnover of 123.7 billion Congolese franc. This might have been about 50 million EUR.
- Kwilu Briques SARL in Congo-Kinshasa uses bagasse from cane sugar production as fuel to make bricks. In 2022 it achieved a turnover of 2.0 billion Congolese franc. It made Kwilu Briques an important player in the Congo-Kinshasa construction market.
- Galactic is a large producer of lactic acid and derivatives. Its head office is in Escanaffles, but it is a multinational company. Galactic makes lactic acid from fermenting sugar. Lactic acid and lactates are used in industry, animal feed and the cosmetics industry. Galactic also produces natural antimicrobial products which are widely used for the preservation of food. In 2022 Galactic had a revenue of 109 million EUR. Finasucre owned 55% of Galactic.
- Futerro S.A. in Escanaffles is 77.25% owned by Galactic, and 12.5% by Finasucre. Futerro produces a bio polymer called 'RENEW' from lactic acid and Poly-Lactic Acid (PLA). RENEW is an organic product that can be used to replace plastic, and can be completely recycled.
- BBS Subsidiary PTY Ltd is an Australian holding which is 100% owned by Finasucre. It is active in Macadamia nuts and has two subsidiaries: TQ Holdings Pty Ltd (“TQH”) and Macadamias International Australia Pty Ltd (“MIA”). In 2012 BBS had 32 employees and a revenue of about 50 million AUD.
- Finasucre has several real estate activities, but these are relatively small. It e.g. owns 45.33% of the Royal Saint-Hubert Galleries in Brussels. It also owns 3.7% of Het Zoute S.A.
- Other investments are in several listed companies and in several small companies.

== History ==
=== Foundation ===
In 1929 the company Suikerfabrieken van Vlaanderen / Sucreries de Flandres was formed by a merger of the Moerbeke Sugar Factory (Sucrerie et Raffinerie de Moerbeke-Waes); the Sucrerie Frantz Wittouck in Selzate; and the Sucrerie de l'Espérance in Snaaskerke. The Suikerfabrieken van Vlaanderen had its offices in Moerbeke. Its shares were divided equally between Finasucre and Raffinerie Tirlemontoise. In turn, Finasucre had a stake in Raffinerie Tirlemontoise.

In 1929, the holding Société Financière des Sucres (Finasucre) was formed. On foundation it had a share capital of 37,500,000 francs. The foundation was a consequence of the above merger. The holding was dominated by the Lippens family, which brought into Finasucre its shares in the companies that had been merged, but also the Escanaffles Sugar Factory. One of the goals of the company was to group the family shares.

=== Expansion ===
In the 1980s, Finasucre started to expand in the sugar industry. In 1982 it acquired the rest of the shares in the Moerbeke Sugar Factory. This was brought about by trading its share in Raffinerie Tirlemontoise for RT's share in Suikerfabrieken van Vlaanderen. In 1986 Finasucre acquired the listed company Sogesucre (owner of Compagnie Sucrière of Kwilu-Ngongo). It first bought the 26 percent participation of Finoutremer and then launched a tender offer for the rest of the shares. By the end of the 1986 Sogesucre disappeared from the Brussels Stock Exchange.

In 1987 Finasucre made plans to acquire Sucrerie de Frasnes, the owner of the Frasnes Sugar Factory. For this it had competition from Ferruzzi, which was then a leading sugar producer. In 1988 Finasucre won by paying about 1.5 billion Belgian Francs for Sucrerie de Frasnes.

In 1989 Finasucre founded the Groupe Sucrier / Suikergroep. The three sugar factories in Belgium, those in: Escanaffles, Moerbeke and Frasnes now became departments of Groupe Sucrier. The four Zairean companies of Sogesucre also became departments of Groupe Sucrier, of which: the Compagnie Sucrière with a sugar cane plantation of 15,000 hectares and 8,200 employees; the Compagnie Industrielle des Boissons with 850 employees; and Zaïre Trading and Engineering with 40 employees. In 1990 Groupe Sucrier closed its factory in Escanaffles, which in 1994 became the home of Galactic. In 2003 Groupe Sucrier would buy the Dutch factory Euro Star in Lelystad.

In 2000 Finasucre bought Bundaberg Sugar in Australia.

In 2003 Iscal Sugar was founded. Groupe Sucrier brought in Moerbeke Sugar Factory and Frasnes Sugar Factory. The other founders were Cosucra-Groupe Warcoing which brought in the Veurne Sugar Factory, and Couplet which brought in the Fontenoy Sugar Factory. The Congo-Kinshasa activities were not included in Iscal Sugar. In 2007 Groupe Sucrier had 62.6% of the Iscal shares and 60% of those in Compagnie Sucrière.

In 2004, 2005 and 2007, the sugar factories in Frasnes, Veurne and Moerbeke were closed. In October 2012 Finasucre squeezed out the minority shareholders (0.3%) of Groupe Sucrier, and then absorbed Groupe Sucrier into Finasucre. Finasucre then held 87.6% of the shares in Iscal Sugar.

=== Diversification ===
During the 2011/2012 accounting year, Finasucre bought 58.2% of the French company SGD, whose sole asset was an about 21% holding in the French company Naturex SA, listed on the Paris stock exchange. By 2013 Finasucre had 98.8% of SGD. The participation in Naturex was part of Finasucre's a diversification strategy. However, when prospects for the future were not good, Givaudan made a tender offer in 2018. Finasucre then sold its participation for 332.5 million EUR.

In 2016 the brick factory Kwilu Briques SARL was started in Kwilu Province in the Democratic Republic of the Congo. In 2018-2019 Finasucre invested in Ÿnsect SAS, a company that breeds insects for agriculture and animal nutrition. It also invested US$30 million in JAB Consumer Fund in Luxembourg.

Also in 2016 Finasucre bought Alldra in the Netherlands.

=== Real estate ===
In 2010 Finasucre bought 25% of the shares in the Royal Saint-Hubert Galleries in Brussels. In 2014 Finasucre participated in the real estate developer Compagnie Het Zoute. In 2016-2017 Finasucre sold its 5% share in the listed real estate developer Aedifica.
