= Celles, Hainaut =

Municipality in Hainaut Province, Wallonia, Belgium

Celles Chèl (Picard)
- Municipality
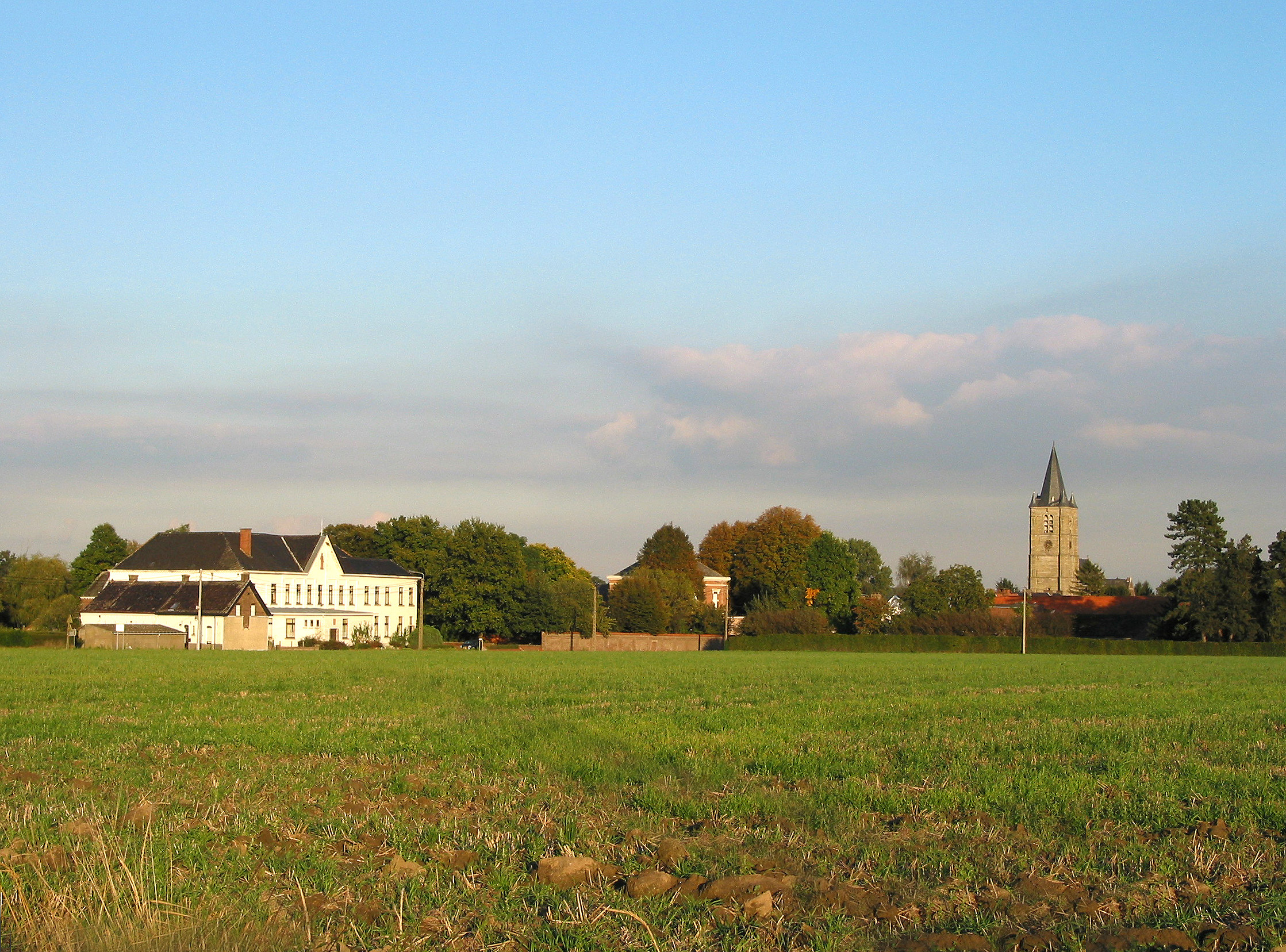

- Flag Coat of arms

- The municipality in the province of Hainaut
- Interactive map of Celles
- Location in Belgium
- Coordinates: 50°43′N 03°27′E
- Country: Belgium
- Community: French Community
- Region: Wallonia
- Province: Hainaut
- Arrondissement: Tournai-Mouscron

Government
  - Mayor: Michaël Busine
  - Governing party: Cel'Avenir (MR+PS)

Area
  - Total: 67.49 km^{2} (26.06 sq mi)

Population (2026-01-01)
  - Total: 5,732
  - Density: 84.93/km^{2} (220.0/sq mi)
- Postal codes: 7760
- NIS code: 57018
- Area codes: 069
- Website: www.celles.be

Celles (French pronunciation: [sɛl]; Picard: Chèl; Walloon: Cele-e-Hinnot) is a municipality of Wallonia located in the province of Hainaut, Belgium.

The municipality consists of the following districts: Celles, Escanaffles, Molenbaix, Popuelles, Pottes, and Velaines.

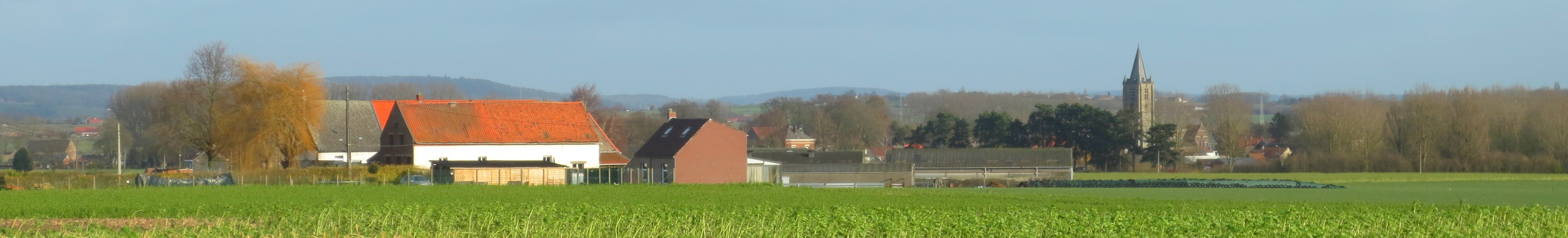
Celles

== See also ==
- List of municipalities of Belgium
