= Bundaberg Sugar =

Sugar manufacturer in the Bundaberg Region, Queensland, Australia

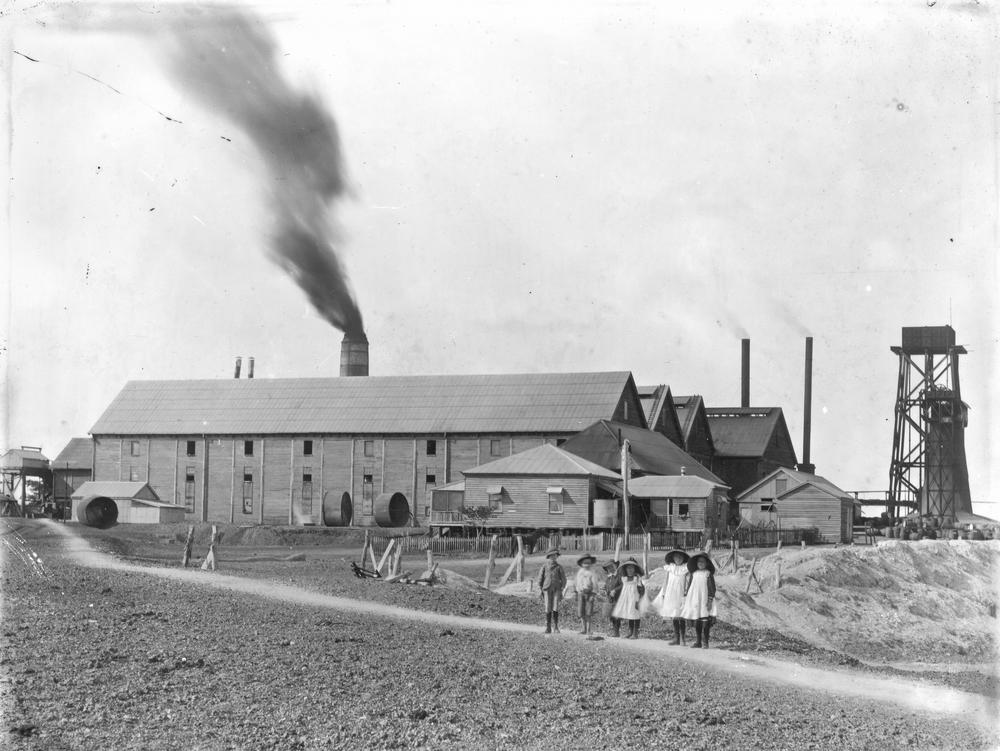
- Millaquin Sugar Mill in c. 1900. It is the company's only operational sugar mill.
- Predecessors: Fairymead Sugar Company and Gibson & Howes
- Founded: 1972 by merger
- Headquarters: Bundaberg, Australia
- Owner: Finasucre

Bundaberg Sugar is a company involved in all aspects of sugar manufacture, including growing and milling the sugarcane and refining and marketing the sugar. It operates principally in the Bundaberg Region, Queensland, Australia. As at 2014, the company had over 9,000 hectares (22,000 acres) of sugarcane plantations.

== History ==
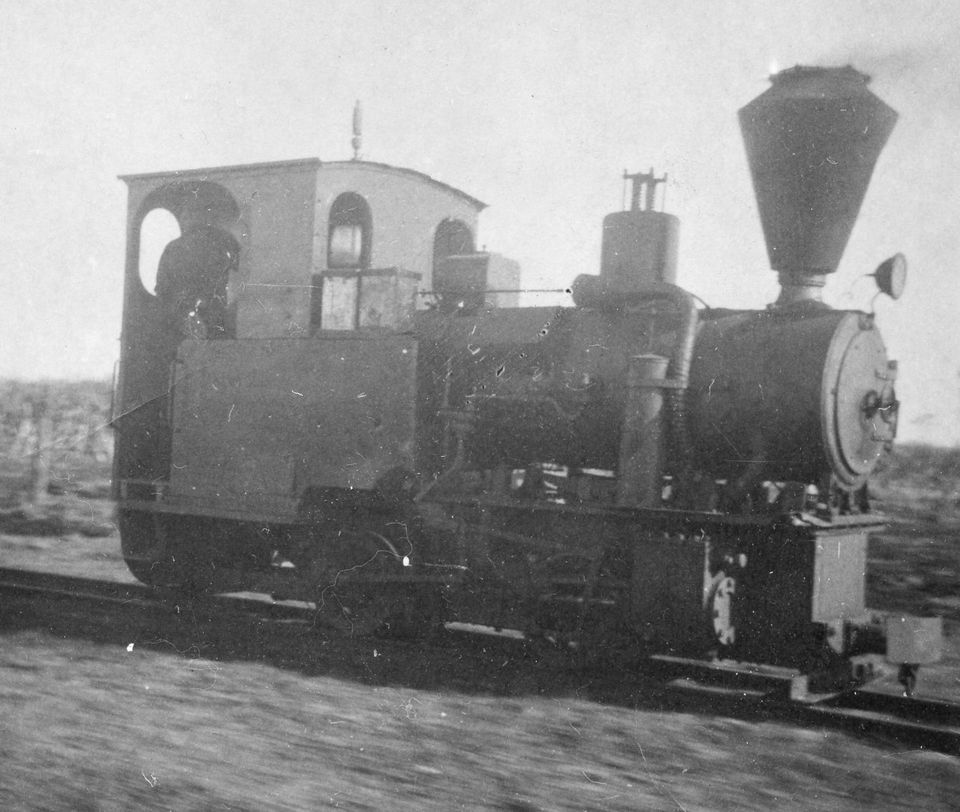
Orenstein & Koppel 0-4-0 steam locomotive built in 1914 for hauling sugar cane trains at Millaquin mill

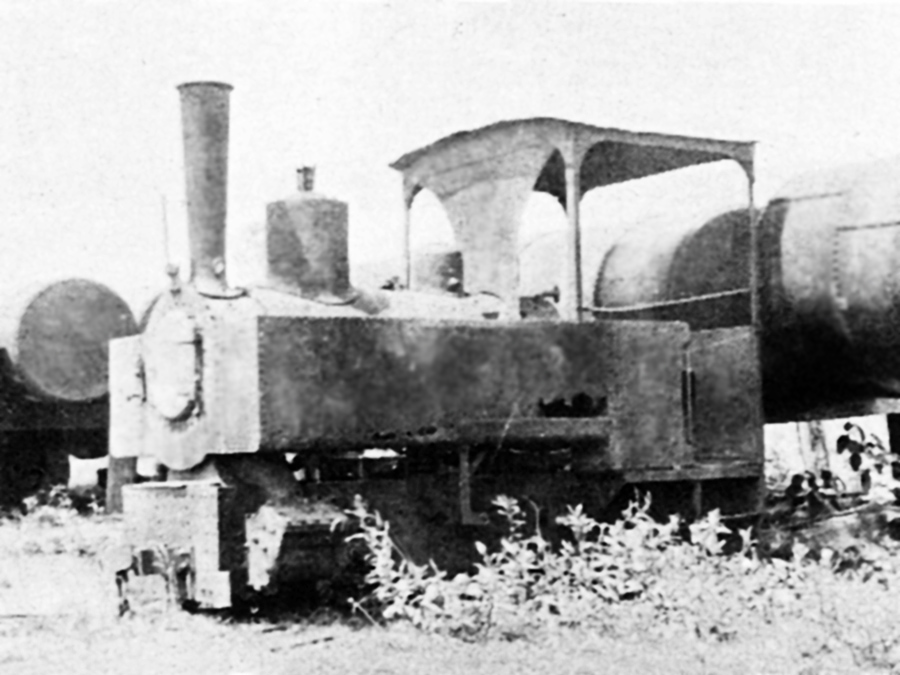
Decauville locomotive works N° 399 of 1904 at Millaquin sugar mill

Bundaberg Sugar Company Limited was created in 1972 from the merger of the Fairymead Sugar Company Limited and Gibson & Howes Limited. Through these, the company can trace its history back to 1870 when the Fairymead Sugar Plantation was first established.

In 2000, Bundaberg was acquired by the Belgian holding company Finasucre. In 2013, the company entered into an agreement with Pacific Gold Macadamias to purchase its waste product, approximately 2,000 tonnes of macadamia nut shells each year, which will be burned as a fuel to process the bagasse (the waste product of sugar milling) into biofuel.

In 2014, the company purchased 14 new water irrigators which use 50% less power than the older style and are expected to increase sugarcane yields by 5–10%.

The Bingera sugar mill was closed in 2020.

In May 2024, a worker died after being trapped while operating a fluming roller. The company was fined $250,000 for failing its safety duties.

== Sugar mills ==
As of 2022 Only one mill remains in operation.

- Millaquin mill at East Bundaberg

Formerly they had other mills operating in the region:

- Qunaba Mill
- Fairymead Mill
- Bingera mill at South Kolan

== See also ==
- List of sugar mills in Queensland
