= Pottes =

- Pottes, Church of Saint Anthony

- Location within Belgium Location within Europe
- Coordinates: 50°43′51″N 03°24′20″E
- Country: Belgium
- Region: Wallonia
- Province: Hainaut
- Municipality: Celles

Pottes is a village and district of the municipality of Celles, located in the Hainaut in Wallonia, Belgium.

The history of the village goes back to Roman times, when a Roman road passed through the area. The village church is a historical building, with a church tower dating from 1432. There is also a historical fortified farm (ferme fortifié) in the village. There are also some other historical buildings, including a listed farmhouse from 1781.
