= List of sugar manufacturers in the Democratic Republic of the Congo =

This is a list of sugar manufacturers in the Democratic Republic of the Congo.

Established sugar manufacturers in DR Congo:

- South Kivu Sugar Refinery (French: Sucrerie du Kivu): formerly Kiliba Sugar Refinery (French: Sucrerie de Kiliba)
- Kwilu Ngongo Sugar Refinery
- Lotokila Sugar Refinery (closed in 2010)

== Output and market share ==
As of December 1990, the output and market share of each manufacturer is summarized in the table below:

Annual output and market share of sugar manufacturers in the Democratic Republic of the Congo
Rank	Name of manufacturer	1990 output (tons)	Market share
1	Compagnie sucrière Kwilu-Ngongo	63,000	66.0%
2	South Kivu Sugar Refinery	26,700	28.0%
3	Lotokila Sugar Refinery	5,700	6.0%
	Total	95,400	100.00%

At that time, national sugar consumption was estimated at 130,000 tons annually, leaving an import window of 34,600 tons annually.

== See also ==
- Economy of the Democratic Republic of the Congo
