= Kwilu Ngongo =

Town in the Kongo Central Province, Democratic Republic of the Congo

- Town and sector
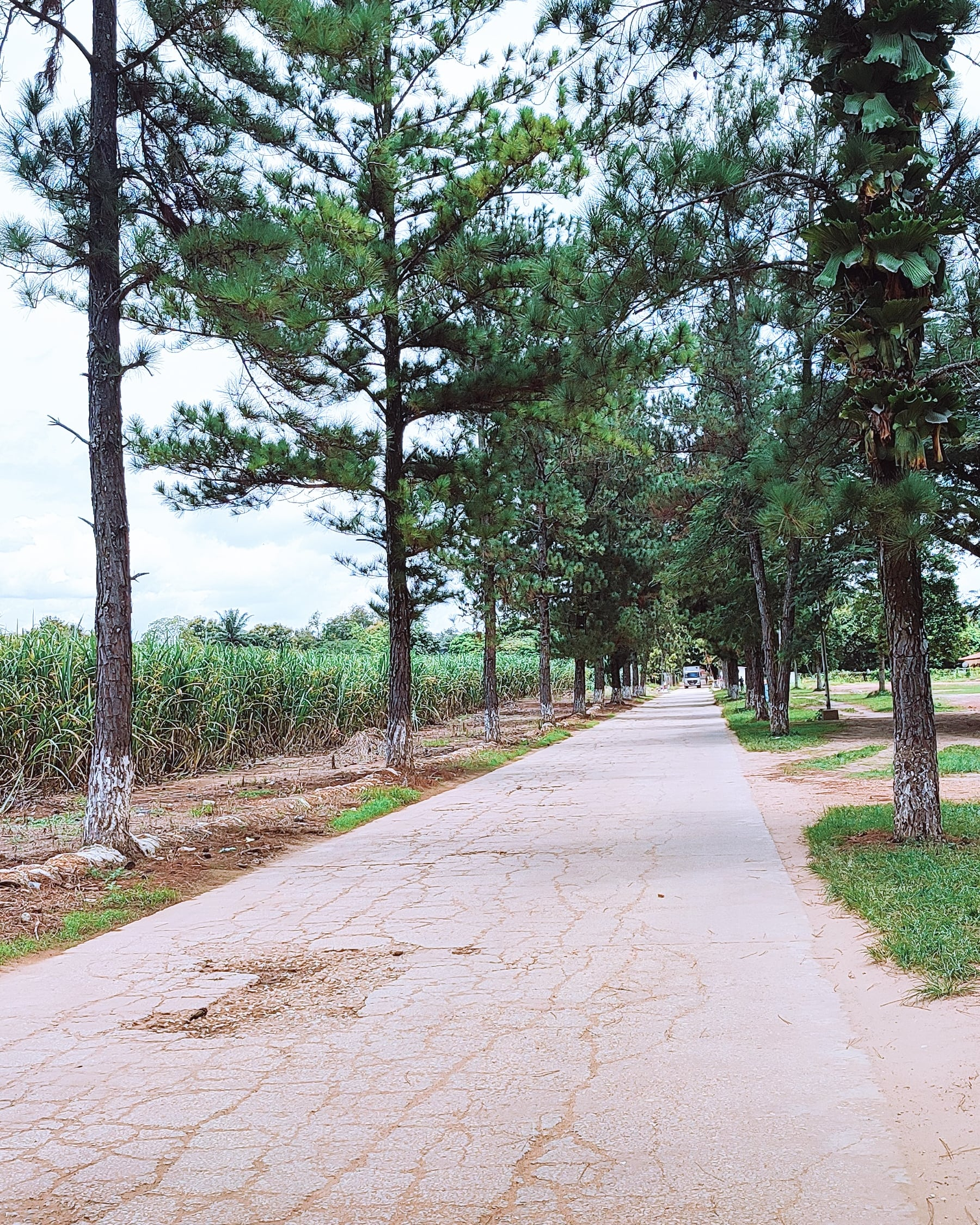
- Kwilu-Ngongo, Bas-Congo

- Location in Democratic Republic of the Congo
- Coordinates: 5°30′2″S 14°40′57″E
- Country: Democratic Republic of the Congo
- Province: Kongo Central
- Territory: Mbanza-Ngungu

Kwilu Ngongo is a town in western Democratic Republic of the Congo. It is a sector of the Mbanza-Ngungu Territory, located in the Kongo Central Province. It is near the Angola border.

The sugar and rum company Compagnie sucrière Kwilu-Ngongo was founded in Kwilu Ngongo in 1925. A health centre was built for the town in 2022.

== Transport ==
The town is connected by roads and the Matadi–Kinshasa Railway to the port city of Matadi and the capital city of Kinshasa. It is approximately equidistant between the two cities, approximately 175 kilometers from each.

== See also ==
- Railway stations in DRCongo
