= Lotokila Sugar Refinery =

Sugar refinery in the Democratic Republic of the Congo

Coordinates: 00°42′47″N 24°33′23″E

- Company type: Public Private Partnership
- Industry: Manufacture and marketing of sugar
- Founded: 1973, Closed 2010
- Headquarters: Lotokila Village, Tshopo Province, Congo
- Products: Sugar, Ethanol
- Number of employees: 3,000+ (1973); 300 (1993)

Lotokila Sugar Refinery (LSR), also Lotokila Sugar Complex (French: Complexe Sucrier de Lotokila), was a sugar manufacturer in the Congo. The sugar complex comprised a sugar plantation, a sugar mill and a distillery. The industrial complex was established in 1973, as a public private partnership between Tshopo Province Administration, and an undisclosed private Chinese company. The complex closed down permanently in 2010.

== Location ==
Lotokila Sugar Refinery was located in the village of Lotokila, along the southern bank of the Congo River, in Tshopo Province (formerly Orientale Province), approximately 79 kilometres (49 mi), northwest of the city of Kisangani, where the provincial capital is located. This is about 2,399 kilometres (1,491 mi), by road, northeast of the city of Kinshasa, the country's capital. The geographical coordinates of Lotokila are: 0°42'47.0"N, 24°33'23.0"E (Latitude:0.713056; Longitude:24.556389).

== Overview ==
At its heyday, the company was a large sugar manufacturer, with a large plantation, occupying thousands of acres. It employed over 3,000 full-time and part-time workers. In addition to sugar, the complex distilled ethanol for industrial use and human consumption.

In 1993, the Chinese investors pulled out of the partnership and the joint venture. They exited the Democratic Republic of the Congo, on account of a deteriorating security environment and declining financial conditions. The provincial administration in Kisangani tried unsuccessfully to soldier on by themselves, closing the sugar mill, cutting down staff numbers by 90 percent to 300, but maintaining the cane fields. They too threw in the towel and closed the industrial complex for good in 2010.

== Ownership ==
LSR was a joint venture between Tshopo Provincial Administration and an undisclosed Chinese company.

== Other considerations ==
With the liquidation of the refinery, local law requires the shareholders to pay terminal benefits to the employees on the pay roster at the time of closure, taking into account (a) seniority and (b) duration of service.

The Tshopo Provincial Administration attempted to settle some of those claims but ran out of money. Almost 900 former workers who are not satisfied, organized a daily sit-down protest in a public park in the city of Kisangani, which has gone on daily since 2013.

== See also ==
- Economy of the Democratic Republic of the Congo
- List of sugar manufacturers in the Democratic Republic of the Congo
