= South Kivu Sugar Refinery =

Sugar factory in the Democratic Republic of the Congo

Coordinates: 03°15′47″S 29°12′29″E

- Type: Public-Private Partnership
- Industry: Manufacture & Marketing of Sugar
- Founded: 1956; 70 years ago
- Headquarters: Kiliba, South Kivu Province, Democratic Republic of the Congo
- Products: Sugar

South Kivu Sugar Refinery (SKSR) ( French: Sucrerie du Kivu), formerly called Kiliba Sugar Refinery (French: Sucrerie de Kiliba), is a sugar manufacturing company in the Democratic Republic of the Congo. After a 25-year period of inactivity since 1996, the sugar factory resumed production in March 2021, under new management and a new brand name.

== Location ==
The sugar refinery and the headquarters of the company that operates the factory are located in the town of Kiliba, in the Ruzizi Region, in Uvira Territory in South Kivu Province, in eastern DR Congo. This is approximately 106 kilometres (66 mi), by road, south of the city of Bukavu, the provincial capital. Kiliba is located about 16.5 kilometres (10 mi), by road, north of the city of Uvira, on the northern shores of Lake Tanganyika.

== Overview ==
The sugar factory was established in 1956 by a Belgian national, Baron Kronacker, under the name "Sucrerie de Kiliba" (Kiliba Sugar Refinery). The factory averaged between 15,000 tons and 19,000 tons of sugar, in annual output, with maximum production of 21,000 tons, achieved once in its history. Due to mismanagement, annual sugar output fell to 900 tons by 1996. That same year saw the beginning of the First Congo War. Sucrerie Kiliba closed down in 1996 due to economic reasons and a deteriorating security situation.

== Take-over and rehabilitation ==
In the 2000s the Government of the Democratic Republic of the Congo, which owned 40 percent of Kiliba Sugar Refinery, dissolved the company and invited qualified investors to form a new company and rehabilitate the plantation and factory. They settled on a consortium, based in Tanzania, with a track record of profitable investments in sugar growing, processing and marketing. The consortium is referred to as the "Super Group of Companies".

Beginning circa 2017, the Tanzanian consortium, using their own funds and starting with a sugarcane nursery of 350 hectares (860 acres), expanded the acreage under cultivation to 3,500 hectares (8,600 acres). They also rehabilitated and modernized the factory. The Congolese government, did not participate financially in the company's modernization and upgrade, despite being a shareholder in the business.

== Ownership ==
As of March 2021, the shareholding in the stock of South Kivu Sugar Refinery is as illustrated in the table below.

South Kivu Sugar Refinery Stock Ownership
| Rank | Name of Owner | Domicile | Ownership (March 2021) |
|---|---|---|---|
| 1 | Government of DRC | DR Congo | 40.0 |
| 2 | "Super Group of Companies" | Tanzania | 60.0 |
| | Total | | 100.00 |

== See also ==
- Economy of the Democratic Republic of the Congo
- List of sugar manufacturers in the Democratic Republic of the Congo
