= Maurice Lippens (politician) =

Belgian businessman, politician, and colonial civil servant and lawyer

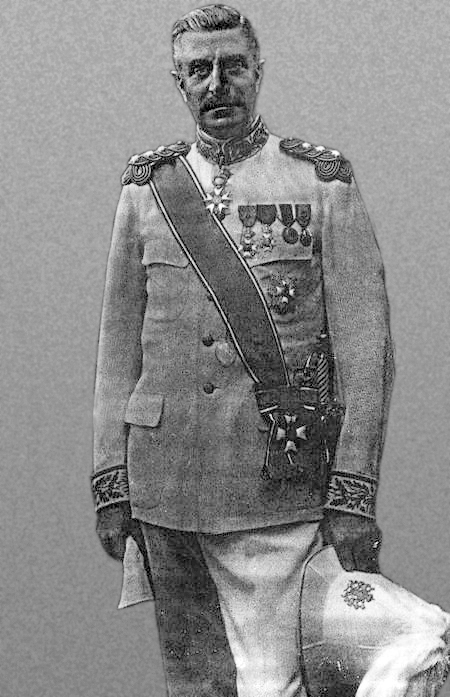
- Lippens in 1950

President of the Senate
- In office 13 November 1934 – 1 July 1936
- Monarch: Albert I
- Preceded by: Emile Digneffe
- Succeeded by: Romain Moyersoen

Governor-General of the Belgian Congo
- In office 30 January 1921 – 24 January 1923
- Preceded by: Eugène Henry
- Succeeded by: Martin Rutten

Provincial governor of East Flanders
- In office 1919–1921
- Preceded by: Raymond de Kerchove d'Exaerde
- Succeeded by: André de Kerchove de Denterghem

Personal details
- Born: 21 August 1875 Ghent, Belgium
- Died: 12 July 1956 (aged 80) Brussels, Belgium
- Party: Liberal Party

Maurice Auguste, Count Lippens (21 August 1875 – 12 July 1956) was a noble Belgian businessman, politician, and colonial civil servant and lawyer.

Born into an influential Liberal family, Lippens practiced as a lawyer before entering local politics in his native province of East Flanders. His business interests included a number of colonial companies. After serving as governor of East Flanders (1919–21), Lippens was recruited to serve as Governor-General of the Belgian Congo (1921–23) in which capacity he launched a major administrative reform. After resigning from the post following disagreement with the colonial administration in Belgium, Lippens returned to his business career and re-entered Belgian politics. After serving in a number of ministerial position, his political career culminated in an appointment as President of the Senate (1934–36). He returned to his business career after resigning from politics in 1936, retiring from business also in 1952. He died in 1956.

== Career ==
Maurice Lippens was born in Ghent, Belgium in 1875 to a prominent local family. His father, Hippolyte Lippens, had been Mayor of Ghent (1882–95) and a politician in the Liberal Party, serving as a member of the Chamber of Representatives and Senate (1882-1906). His mother came from the aristocratic de Kerchove de Denterghem family. He gained a doctorate in Law from the University of Ghent and practiced as a lawyer in Ghent.

In 1904, Rutten became a provincial councillor for East Flanders and, in 1906, was elected mayor of the municipality of Moerbeke-Waas. In 1907, Maurice joined the administrative board of the Compagnie du Congo pour le Commerce et l'Industrie (CCCI) replacing his deceased father. During the German occupation of Belgium in World War I, Lippens was involved in resistance and was held as a prisoner from 1915–18. In 1919, he was appointed governor of East Flanders where he reorganised the education and health provisions of the province.

Based on his reputation as governor of East Flanders, Lippens was recruited in 1921 by Louis Franck, the Minister of the Colonies and a Liberal politician, to serve as Governor-General in the Belgian Congo. In this role, Lippens began a major series of administrative reforms, decentralising power from the colonial administration in Boma to the Congo's provinces. The colonial budget and education systems were also reformed.

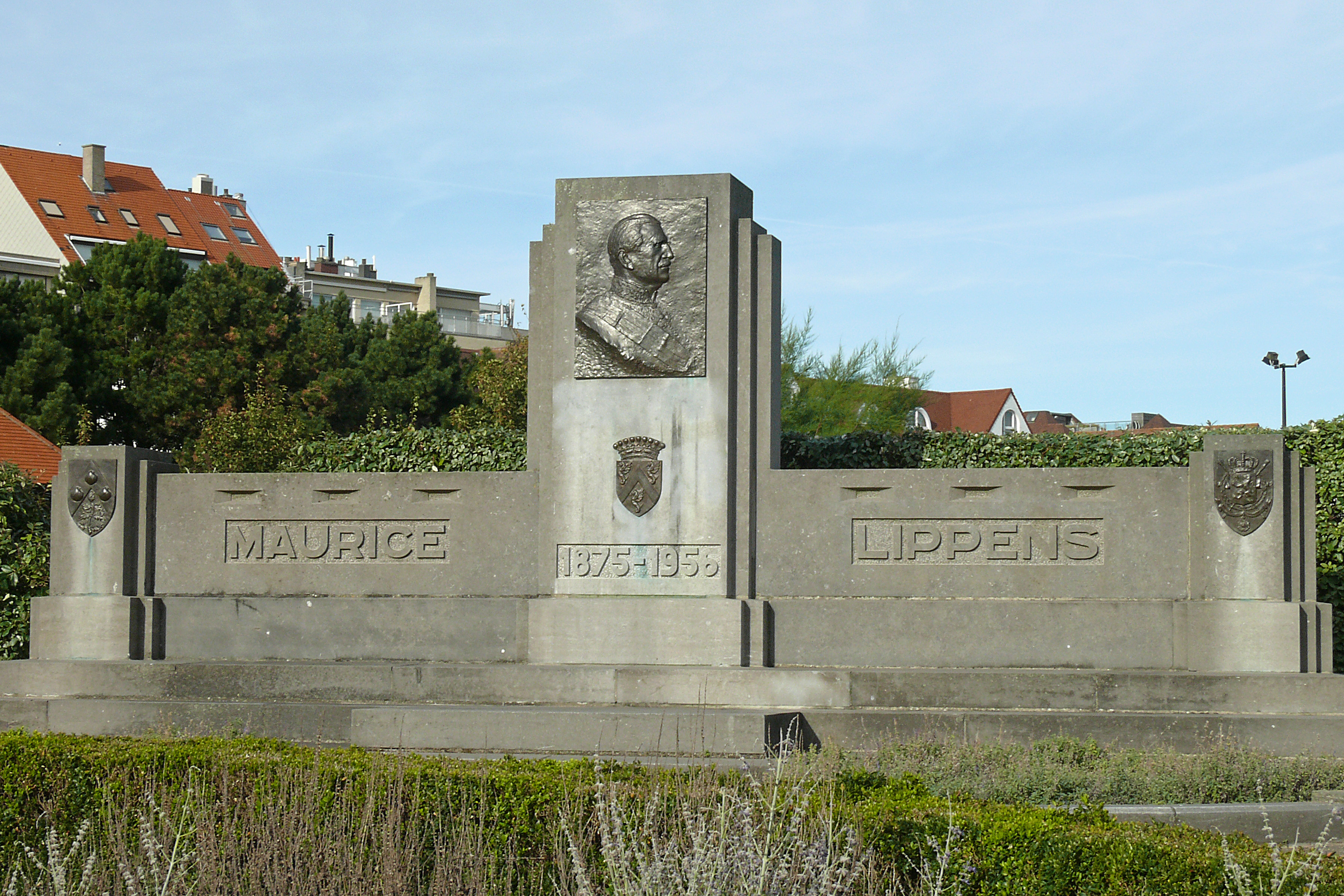
Monument to Lippens in Knokke-Heist, Belgium

Lippens' programme of reforms led to tension between him and Franck, with Lippens demanding much greater autonomy for the Governor-General from the Ministry of the Colonies in Belgium. He reacted angrily to a plan by the Ministry to launch the construction of a railway between Buta and Bambili and, in January 1923, offered his resignation.

Retiring from the colonial administration, Lippens remained active in colonial businesses. He became administrator of the Banque d'Outremer and, returning to his position in the CCCI, later became the board chairman of the CCCI. Among his business interests were Congolese companies producing cane sugar and the Sucrière congolaise company named its first settlement Moerbeke (now Kwilu Ngongo) after Lippens' hometown. In 1931, he became a member of the board of the Société Générale de Belgique, the country's largest holdings company.

Lippens re-entered Belgian politics as a Liberal senator in 1925. In 1927, he became Minister for Railways, the Postal Service and Telegraph and, in 1929, Minister of Transport. In 1934, he was appointed to the honorary position of Minister of State. He became President of the Senate in November the same year. He did not stand as a candidate in the 1936 elections. Between 1935 and 1939, Lippens was involved in the charitable organisations that founded the Royal Library of Belgium in Brussels and the Academia Belgica in Rome, Italy.

Lippens was given the title of Count in 1934. He ran a charity for children in Spa in the German occupation of Belgium during World War II. He retired from his business interests in 1952 and died in 1956. His daughter Suzanne married Léon Lippens (1911-1986).

== Honours ==
- Minister of State.
- Knight Grand Cross in the Order of the Crown.

Political offices
Preceded by Raymond de Kerchove d'Exaerde	Governor of East Flanders; 1919–1921	Succeeded by André de Kerchove de Denterghem
Preceded by Eugène Henry	Governor-General of the Belgian Congo; 1921–1923	Succeeded by Martin Rutten
Preceded by Emile Digneffe	President of the Senate; 1934–1936	Succeeded by Romain Moyersoen
