= Escanaffles =

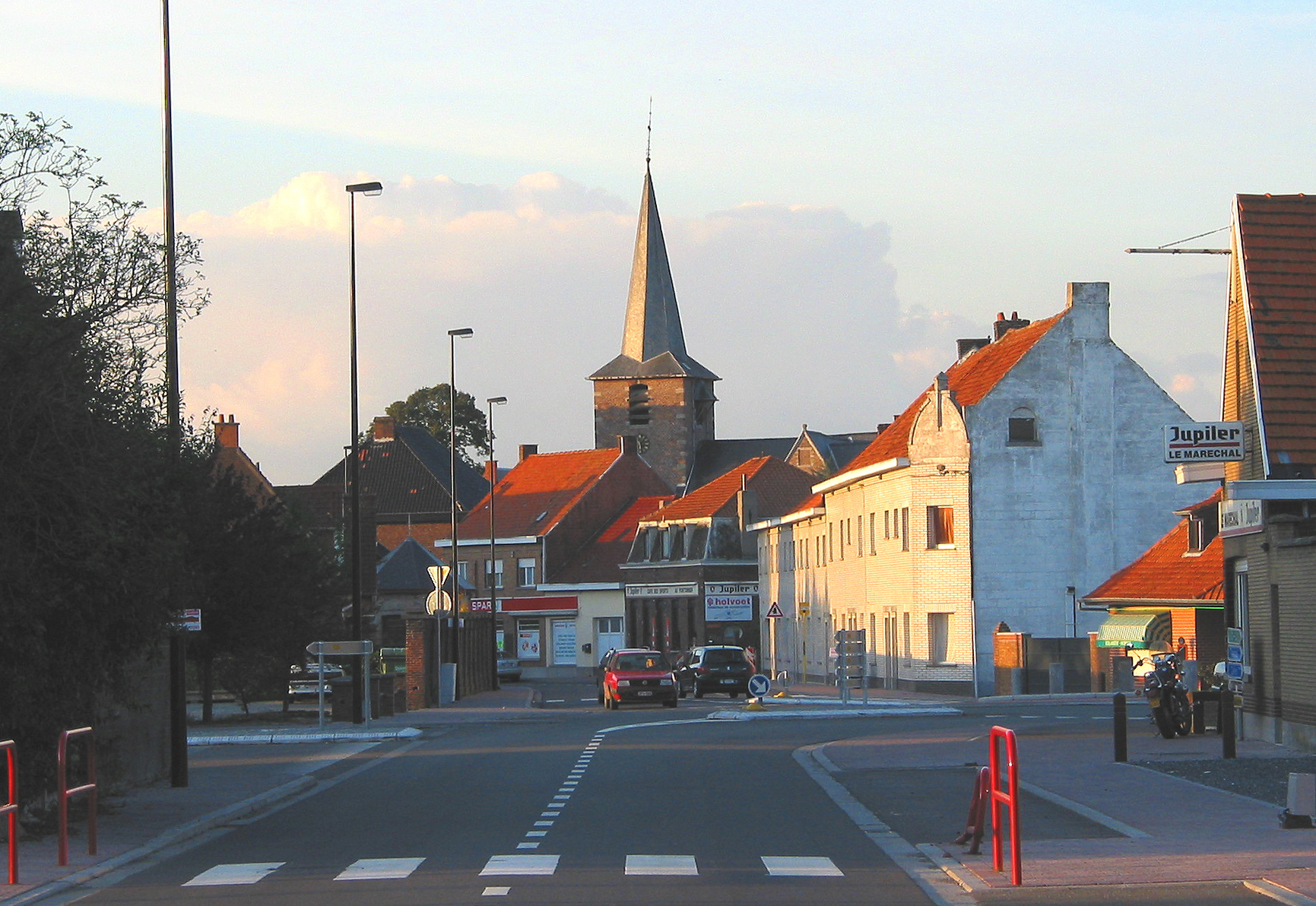
- Rue Provinciale

- Location within Belgium Location within Europe
- Coordinates: 50.755879°N 3.447360°E
- Country: Belgium
- Region: Wallonia
- Province: Hainaut Province
- Municipality: Celles, Hainaut

Population
  - Total: 1,200

Escanaffles is a village of Wallonia in the Belgian municipality of Celles, Hainaut Province.

== Geography ==
Escanaffles is on the east bank of the Scheldt. The brook Rhosnes exits into the Scheldt just north of Escanaffles. Due to the canalization of the Scheldt some small areas of the former municipality are now on the other bank of the Scheldt.

== History ==
According to the chronicle 'Annales Historiae Illustrium Principum Hannoniae' ("Annals of the History of Illustrious Princes of Hainaut") by Jacques de Guyse (1334−1399), Escanaffles was probably founded by Ambiorix as the fortress Catavulcus to protect a crossing the Scheldt. This is not a reliable story, but one can assume that De Guyse noted something at Escanaffles. In 1363 a 'fortresse d'Escanaffles' was mentioned.

Later, others reported that Escanaffles had been founded as a Viking fortress. In the mid-nineteenth century, a site named 'Field of Grand Breucq' called 'Fort d'Escanaffles' was identified opposite the village church.

In 1872 the Escanaffles Sugar Factory was founded. It was closed down in 1990.

Until 1977, Escanaffles was a separate municipality. Its independence was ended by the Fusion of the Belgian municipalities, after which it became part of Celles municipality.

== Escanaffles today ==
The Escanaffles Sugar Factory was closed down in January 1990. It was then repurposed to house Finasucre's lactic acid producing daughter Galactic. Galactic was founded in 1994 and focuses on lactic acid derivatives that inhibit the growth of bacteria. This improves food safety and preservation.

The church of Escanaffles dates from about 1100 and is situated on a round churchyard. The tower on the west side dates from 1775. It is followed by an important Romanesque nave from the 11th or early 12th century. It is followed by three 16th-century naves of equal height, making it a hall church. The choir extends on all three naves, which are closed by an apse. In the interior, the southern apse shows two fragments of a repurposed 12th century Baptismal font of the Tournai font type, showing birds picking grapes.

The municipal cemetery has the grave of the Australian Flying ace Thomas Baker and 2nd lieutenant J. G. Leckenby.

== Sources ==
- De Guyse, Jacques (1828), Histoire de Hainaut: traduite en Français avec le texte Latin en regard, vol. III, Arnold Lacrosse, Bruxelles
- Jeance, Gérard (2016). "Escanaffles 1830 à 1910". Calameo.
- Bernier, Théodore (1879), Dictionnaire geographique, historique, archeologique ... du Hainaut, Hector Manceaux
- Annales des travaux publics de Belgique, vol. XV, B.J. van Dooren, Bruxelles, 1857
- Dupuis, Laurent (7 April 2015). "Galactic, l'histoire d'une reconversion réussie". DH les Sports.
- "C'était un 16 janvier 1990: fermeture de la sucrerie d'Escanaffles - 16/01/08". Notele. 15 January 2008.
- Hook, Sonya (29 July 2014). "Key Interview: Opportunities for Lactic Acid Fermentation in Food Safety and Nutrition". Food Ingredients 1st.
- Le patrimoine monumental de la Belgique, vol. 6/1 Hainaut Tournai, Ministère de la Culture française, 1978, ISBN 9782802100201
- "Graven van Capt Thomas C.R. Baker, Sopwith Snipe E8062 4 Sqn AFC, en 2Lt J.G. Leckenby, RE8 C2774 4 Sqn RAF". Hangar Flying. 29 December 2007.
