= Léon Lippens (naturalist) =

Belgian naturalist (1911–1986)

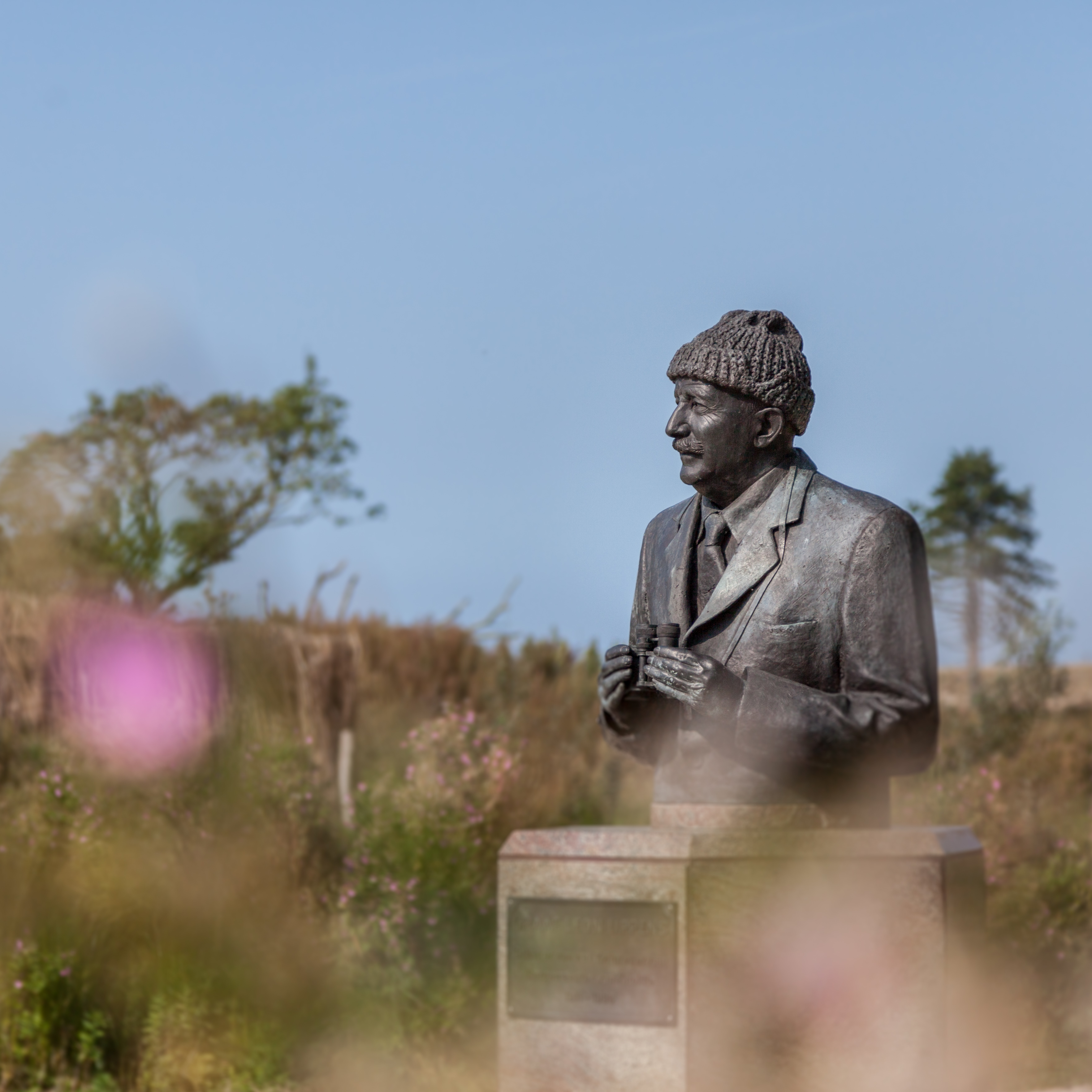
Bust of Count Lippens in Zwin

Count Léon Anne Marie Ghislain Lippens (6 September 1911 – 16 June 1986) was a Belgian nobleman, politician and naturalist who was involved in nature conservation. He was responsible for the creation of the Zwin bird reserve. The bird subspecies Geokichla guttata lippensi was named in his honour.

== Life and work ==
Lippens was born in Bulskampveld Castle in Beernem to forester Raymond (1875-1964) and Ghislaine Félicie Marie Joséphine Cornélie de Béthune (1889–1969). He studied humanities and then law at the KU Leuven, receiving a doctorate in 1934, after which he would travel to the Belgian Congo where he would work on his family estate. He also served as a deputy curator for Virunga park in 1935–36. He served in the hunting council of Belgium from 1939 to 1980 and became a mayor of Knokke in 1946. He became a secretary general for the International Council for Bird Preservation in 1935 and served in the position until 1946. Zwin was a waterway to Bruges in which dykes were constructed making it a salt marsh. The area was owned by Philippe-Francois Lippens in 1784 and it was passed on to the Lippens family. Leon recognized the value of the region for its bird life and had it protected as the Zwin Wetlands Reserve in 1952. He wrote that "it is as stupid to drain the last of our great marshes, with their wealth of wildlife, as it would be to demolish the Cathedral of Chartres to plant potatoes." He also established the Belgian Nature and Bird Reserves trust.

Lippens married a cousin Suzanne (1903–1985), daughter of Maurice August Lippens (1875–1959), in 1936 and they had two sons and two daughters. Although Lippens' father had been raised to nobility in 1921, his title of Count became transferrable in 1949 and he received it following the death of his father-in-law in 1959. He received an Order of the Golden Ark from Prince Bernhard of the Netherlands in 1974. A subspecies of the African thrush Geokichla guttata, lippensi, was named after him Michel Louette and Alexandre Prigogine in 1984.
