= Hippolyte Lippens =

Belgian lawyer, manager of sugar factories and liberal politician

- Born: 16 October 1847; Moerbeke-Waas, Belgium
- Died: 31 December 1906 (aged 59); Ghent, Belgium
- Occupations: politician, lawyer, manager

Hippolyte Lippens (16 October 1847 – 31 December 1906) was a lawyer, manager of sugar factories and a Belgian liberal politician. He was a son of Auguste Lippens, burgomaster of Moerbeke-Waas, and he married in 1873, with Louise de Kerckhove de Denterghem, a daughter of the burgomaster of Ghent Charles de Kerchove de Denterghem.

He became burgomaster of Ghent (1882–1895), a member of parliament (1882–1886 and 1889–1890) and senator (1900–1906) for the liberal party. During his tenure as a burgomaster, the renovation of the Neerscheldewijk (current Vlaanderenstraat, Limburgstraat and Henegouwenstraat) in Ghent was started according to the Paris model.

== See also ==
- Liberal Party
- Politics of Belgium
- Liberal Party (Belgium) politicians

== Sources ==
- Hippolyte Lippens (Liberal Archive)
