= Battle of Tabora =

1916 WWI East African Campaign battle

- Part of the East African Campaign of World War I
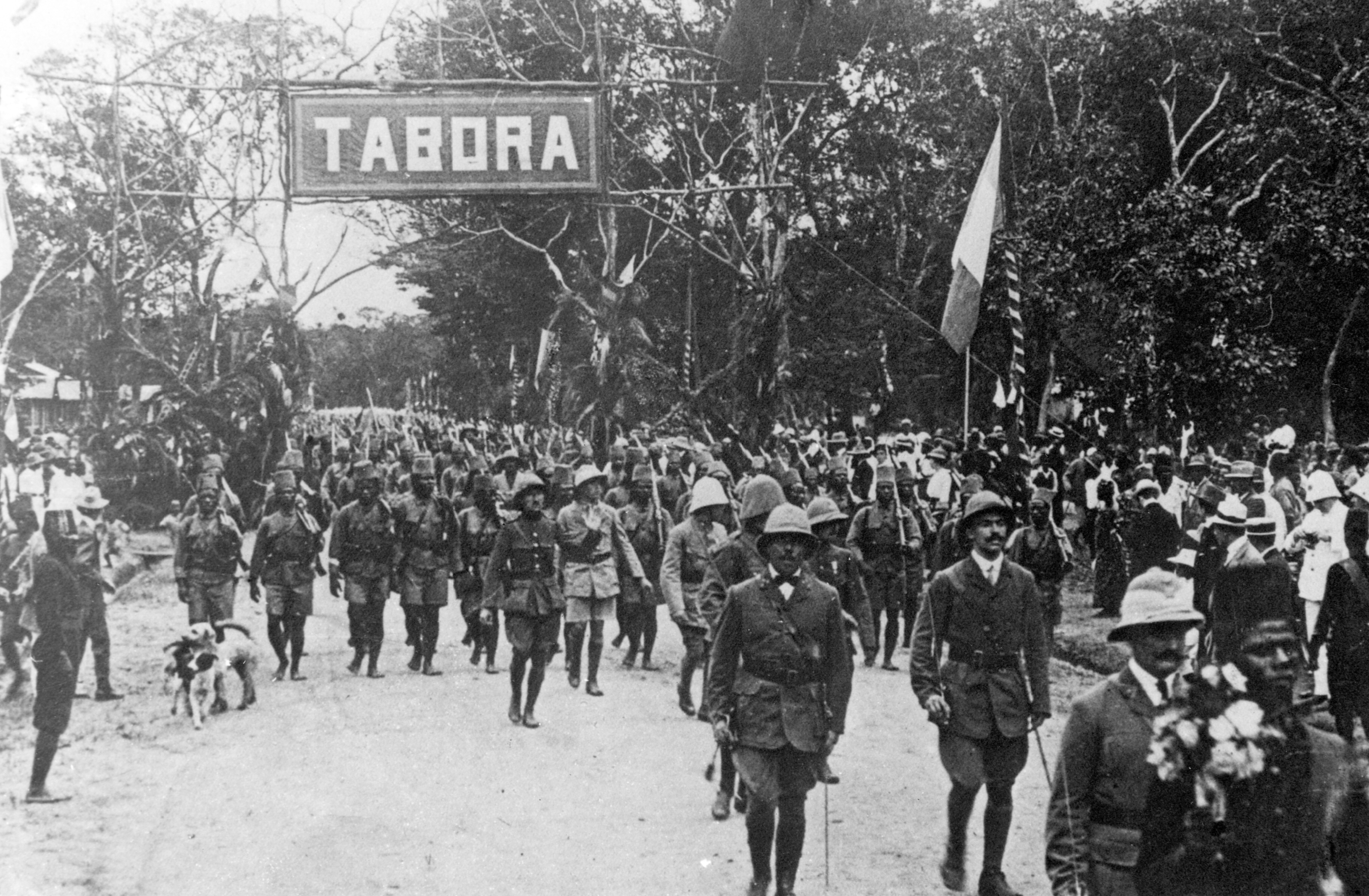
- Belgo-Congolese troops of the Force Publique after the Battle of Tabora, 19 September 1916
| Date | 8–19 September 1916 |
| Location | Tabora, German East Africa (modern-day Tanzania) 5.0167°S 32.8000°E |
| Result | Belgian victory: Most of the Ruanda-Urundi territory is left under Belgian control for the rest of the war; Allies gain control of the vital Tanganjikabahn railway line |

Belligerents
| Belgium: Belgian Congo | German Empire: German East Africa |

Commanders and leaders
| (Belgian Congo) Charles Tombeur | Kurt Wahle |

Strength
| (Belgian Congo) 10,000 men | 5,000 men |

Casualties and losses
| 1,300 | 400 (228 captured) |
- Location within Tanzania Battle of Tabora (Africa)

The Battle of Tabora (French: Bataille de Tabora; 8–19 September 1916) was a military action which occurred around the town of Tabora in the north-west of German East Africa (modern-day Tanzania) during World War I. The engagement was part of the East Africa Campaign and was the culmination of the Tabora Offensive in which a Belgian force from the Belgian Congo crossed the border and captured the settlement of Kigoma and Tabora (the largest town in the interior of the German colony), pushing the German colonial army back. The victory not only left much of the Ruanda-Urundi territory under Belgian military occupation but gave the Allies control of the important Tanganjikabahn railway.

== Background ==
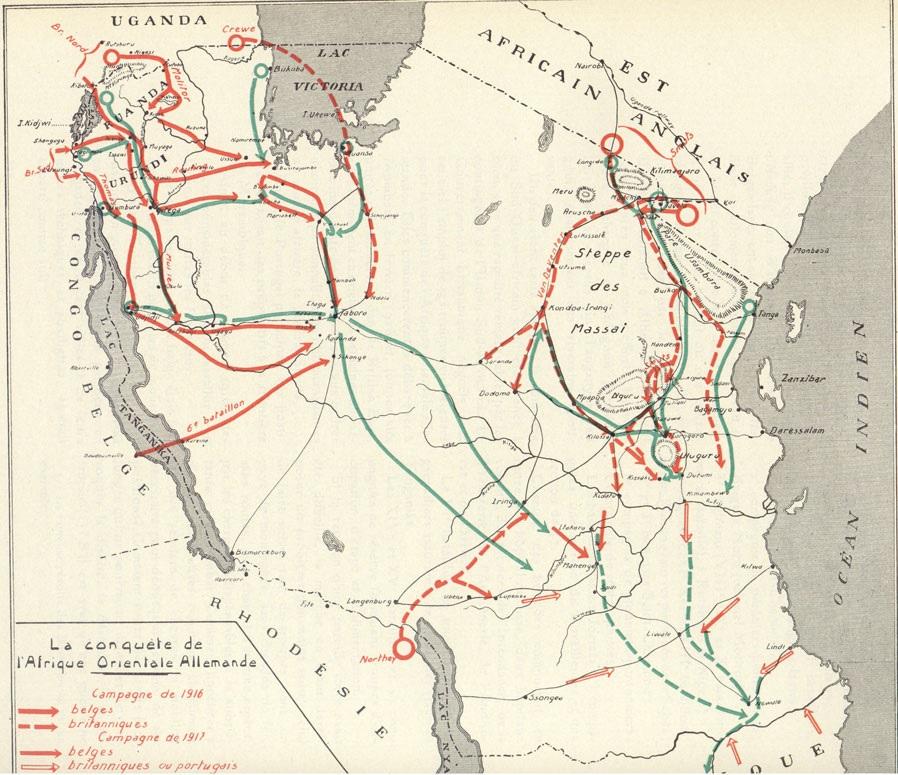
Map of the East African Campaign, 1916-1917.

Within the framework of the neutral Belgian Congo, the Force Publique could only adopt a defensive position. This changed on 15 August 1914 when German ships, stationed on Lake Tanganyika, bombed the port of Mokolobu (south of Uvira) and the Lukuga post a week later. On 24 September the Germans occupied Kwijwi Island, in this way taking control of Lake Kivu.

After the conquest of Ruanda in May 1916 and of Urundi in June by the Belgo-Congolese forces, two columns were formed to take Tabora. In the north, the first column (Brigade Nord) reached Lake Victoria near Mwanza on 30 July, after heavy fighting in the Ussewi region. Early July the second column (Brigade Sud) advanced southwards from Kitega along the eastern shore of Lake Tanganyika. On 28 July this column captured the port of Kigoma, terminus of the strategic railway line from Dar Es Salaam passing through Tabora to Kigoma. In early August both columns started their converging marches to Tabora. The smaller British Lake Force, commanded by South African Brigadier-general Charles Crewe, was in a race with the Belgian forces to reach Tabora. Lake Force failed and Crewe blamed heavy German resistance and severe supply problems.

== Battle of Tabora ==
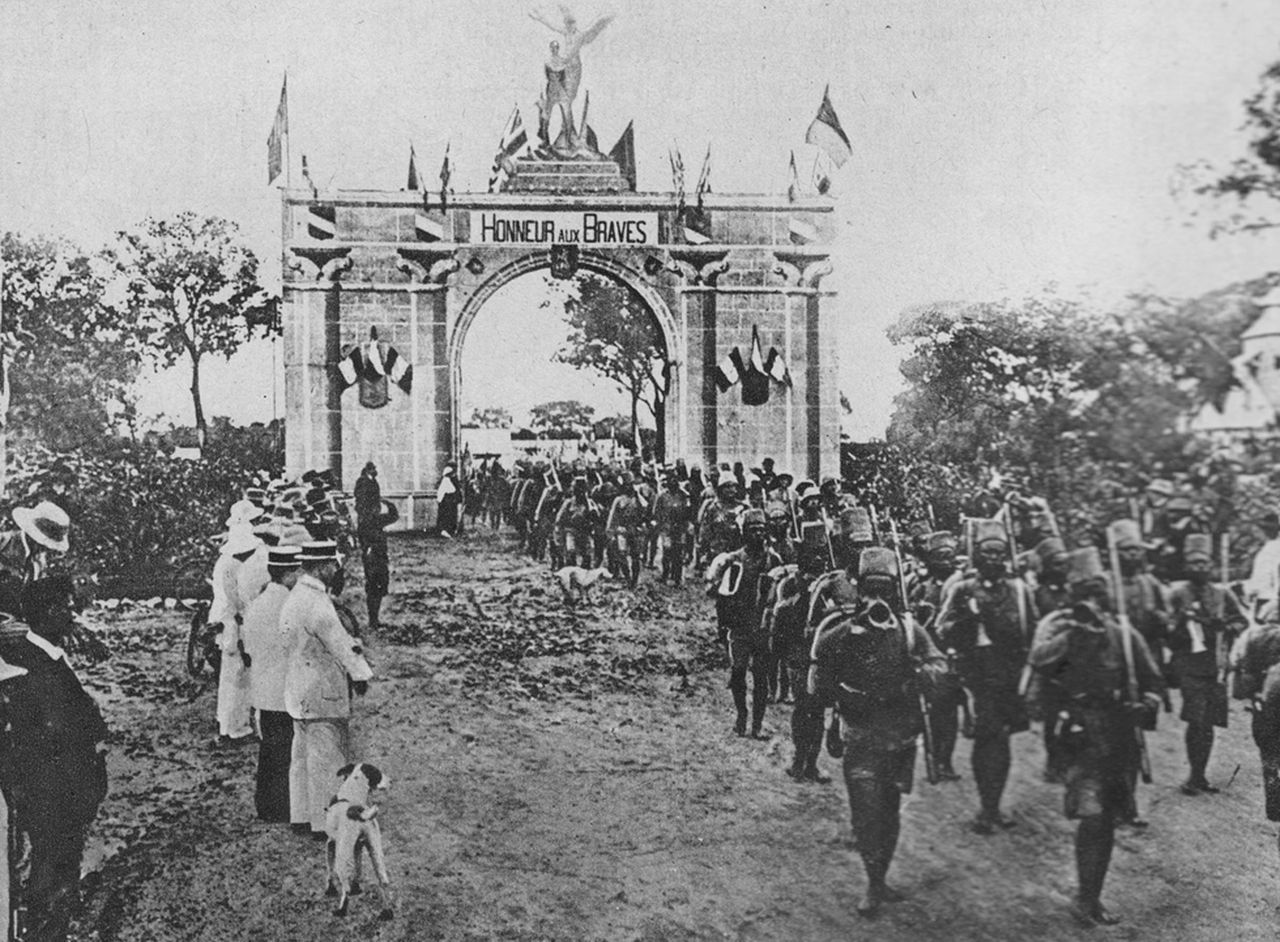
The triumphant entry into Elisabethville of Force Publique troops upon their return from Tabora in 1917.

The southern brigade commanded by Colonel Frederik Valdemar Olsen advanced to Tabora following the Tanganyika Railway (Tanganjikabahn), which the Germans destroyed as they withdrew to the east. (Note: The Germans also made sure no trains and other equipment were left behind in the stations that were taken.) Tabora was an open plain surrounded by hills, which German Maj. Gen. Wahle had used to build his defences; his forces included loyalist Rwandan Indugaruga warriors. The southern brigade took control of the German railway station at Usoke on 30 August, in response Wahle sent reinforcements from Tabora to Usoke by train. The German Schutztruppen launched the counterattack on Usoke from 2 to 3 September, which was repelled by the Force Publique.

On the 7th, General Wahle launched another counterattack on the train station of Usoke, this time a naval gun was mounted on one of the railway wagons. Both sides suffered heavy losses, the train station was bombarded, the Force publique launched an attack, and the Germans were pushed back.

When the last resistance in Usoke (west of Tabora) was broken, the Belgians advanced to reach the German defences of Tabora at Lulanguru on 8 September. The southern brigade led the offensive actions for the next 4 days, closing in on Tabora from the west. Wahle established his main positions at Itaga, north of Tabora. From 10-12 September the northern brigade encountered heavy German resistance in the hills of Itaga, where they suffered considerable casualties. (Note: Brigade Nord, under Lieutenant-colonel Armand Huyghé, took the hills, but Wahle sent reinforcements by rail pushing the Force Publique back the next day.) By this time Wahle's forces were reduced to 1.100 rifles and the desertion of his askari soldiers multiplied.

On 16 September the Germans intercepted a letter from Crewe for Colonel Philippe Molitor (Brigade Nord), which stated that the main offensive from the north was planned for the 19th. After heavy fighting, the German army retreated to the southeast, in three columns. The civilian authorities of Tabora surrendered to the troops of the Force Publique on 19 September.

== Aftermath ==
The Belgians liberated around 200 Allied prisoners of war (mainly Belgians and British) and 228 German soldiers were captured. The Force Publique lost 1,300 soldiers. On 3 October, after the Allies had established control of the African Great Lakes region, Lake Force was disbanded. Wahle, in anticipation of an Allied pursuit, was retreating at a rapid pace to Mahenge and found himself in unexplored and uninhabited terrain, with no water and food at his disposal.

Of the Rwandan Indugaruga involved in the Battle of Tabora, few ever returned to Rwanda. Those who did were subsequently abused by the Belgian colonial authorities.
