= Frederik-Valdemar Olsen =

Danish general

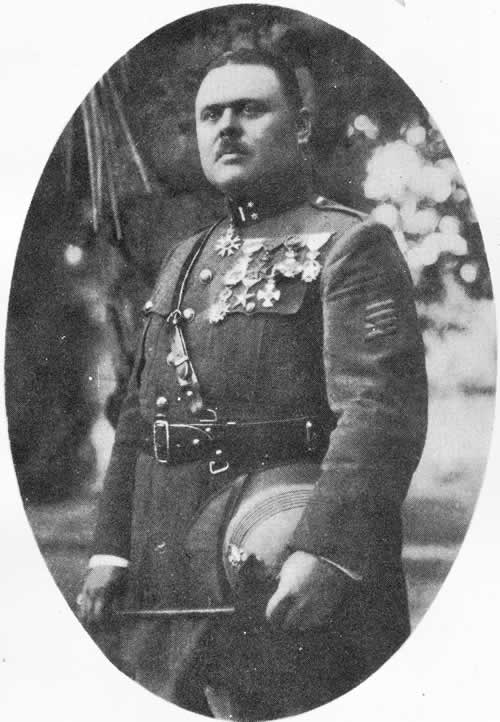

Commander of the Southern Brigade (Southern Ruanda and Urundi)
- In office June 1916 – 1917

Commander of the Force Publique
- In office 22 November 1920 – September 1924
- Preceded by: Philippe Molitor
- Succeeded by: Paul Ermens

Governor of Congo-Kasaï
- In office September 1924 – April 1925
- Preceded by: Alphonse Engels
- Succeeded by: Alphonse Engels

Personal details
- Born: 24 May 1877 Kalundborg, Denmark
- Died: 19 November 1962 (aged 85) Etterbeek, Belgium
- Occupation: Officer, businessman

Frederik-Valdemar Olsen (24 May 1877 – 19 November 1962) was a Danish soldier who became a general and commander in chief of the Belgian Congo Force Publique. He was born into a poor family, joined the Danish army, then in 1898 volunteered to serve in the Congo Free State. He rose quickly through the ranks, and in 1909–1910 played an important role in a stand-off with German and British forces disputing the eastern border of what was now the Belgian Congo. During World War I Olsen commanded a force that defended Northern Rhodesia against a German attack, then advanced from the south of Lake Kivu to take Tabora in what is now Tanzania. After the war he became commander of the Force Publique before retiring as a general in 1925. Olsen was then made general manager of the state-owned Congo River shipping line Unatra, later combined with railway lines to form Otraco. He retired from this position in 1947.

== Early years (1877–1898) ==
Frederik-Valdemar Olsen was born on 24 May 1877 in Kalundborg Denmark. His parents were Peter Olsen (1842–1920) and Thora Marie Thomsen (1840–1923). His father worked as a porter carrying passenger luggage between the Kalundborg railway station and the ferry to the island of Zealand, while his mother did odd jobs and ran a bakery. He attended the Realskölle in Kalundborg. He graduated in 1893.

Olsen found a job at the city police station. On 12 October 1896 he entered the army for his compulsory military service. His ability was noted by his superiors, and the mayor of Kalundborg paid for him to study at the Military Academy in Copenhagen. On 8 October 1897 Olsen became a 2nd lieutenant. He was assigned to the 1st Artillery Regiment, where he served in a battery commanded by Johan Stöckel, who had worked on construction of the Fort de Shinkakasa. Stöckel's stories made him keen to serve in Africa, and he was engaged by Hans-Hugold von Schwerin for service in the Congo Free State. He was a second lieutenant in Force Publique.

== Force Publique ==
=== Pre-War (1898–1914) ===
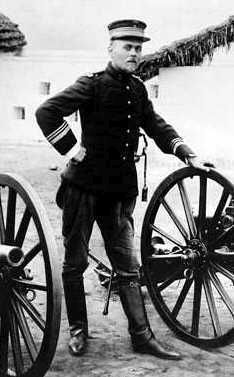
Olsen as a young officer

Olsen sailed from Antwerp to Boma in December 1898, and was assigned to the Irebu camp under commander Luc-Arthur-Joseph Jeuniaux. He was sent to Orientale Province on 11 October 1899. On 7 December 1899 he joined the troops that were repressing the revolt that had begun in 1896 in the northeast of the Congo during the Congo-Nile expedition of Francis Dhanis.

There were constant incidents in the region with Germans who had occupied some of the Belgian territory during the revolt and were reluctant to return it to the Belgians. Commander Paul Costermans sent Olsen to found a post in July 1900 on Lake Kivu, which later became Bukavu. Lieutenant Paul Léon Delwart, head of the elite company of the Force Publique in Orientale Province, died on 19 August 1900. Olsen replaced Delwart as leader of the elite Belgian company in the Ruzizi-Kivu region, based in Uvira. Olsen completed his first 3-year term and returned to Antwerp on 11 December 1901. His health had been damaged, and he took a 9-month leave of absence.

Olsen was promoted to captain, and left Antwerp on 2 October 1902 for Boma. He went on to Stanleyville, where Justin Malfeyt gave him command of the mobile column that was to travel to Uvira. Due to a severe attack of malaria he temporarily handed over common of the column, but reached Uvira on 7 March 1903. He next came down with hematuria, and had to return to Europe, reaching Antwerp on 21 March 1904. He left Antwerp again on 6 October 1904 and returned to the Ruzizi-Kivu territory. On 9 December 1905 he was appointed captain-commander, and on 23 March 1906 was placed in command of the Uvira zone. On 12 February 1907 he was promoted to command of the Ruzizi-Kivu territories. He organized the border defenses, pacified the region and created a disciplined body of troops. He went on leave in Europe from 24 November 1907 to 23 July 1908.

During his fourth term Olsen had to deal with a complicated situation due to unauthorized agreements between local Belgian and German officers, and agreements between the Germans and the British. It had been agreed that the Mufumbiro Mountains were British, but instead the Germans had ceded the plain of Ufumbiro near Rutshuru to the British despite its clearly being in Belgian territory. The Kivu frontier incident began when the British district commissioner John Methuen Coote notified the Belgians on 26 June 1909 that he was taking possession. Olsen travelled there from the Lake Albert region, arrested two British soldiers camped at Kurezi, and created three redoubts that blocked all access by the British. Coote decided to repossess Kurezi but was stopped in a marshy region and ran low of food. Olsen refused to meet Coote until he withdrew, which Coote would not do, and a stalemate ensued for ten months while the Belgian, German and British governments agreed on their respective borders in the region. At the same time Olsen had to deal with various provocations by the Germans in the volcano region to the north of Lake Kivu.

After the Kivu border question had been settled in May 1910, Olsen was charged with creating a military force in Katanga to protect the rich mining region from attempts by South African Boer trekkers to settle it. Olsen worked from the end of July to the end of October to transport a force to Katanga consisting of 26 Europeans, 1,000 Congolese, 26 machine guns, 20 cannons, with their food, equipment and ammunition. The only transport was the small steamer Delcommune on Lake Tanganyika. He organized a well trained force in Katanga, and pioneered the use of bicycles by the Force Publique. He was promoted to major on 20 November 1911.

=== World War I (1914–1918) ===
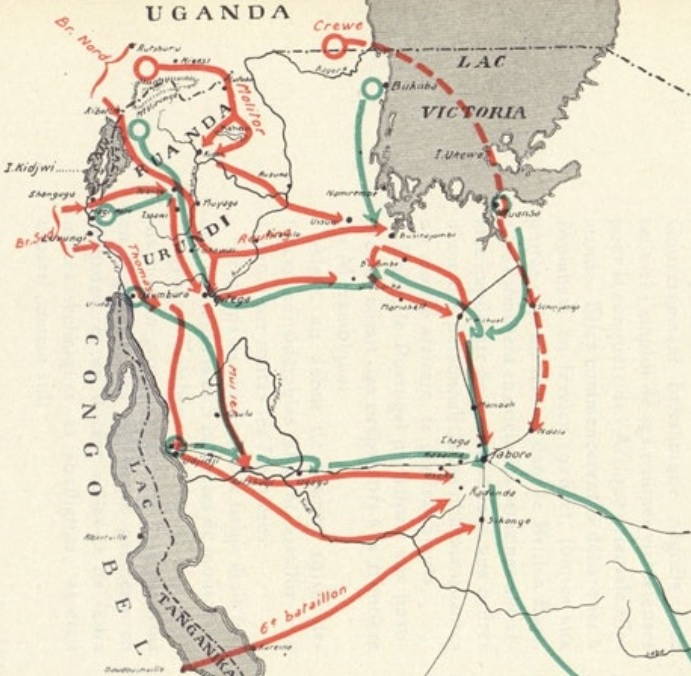
Tabora Offensive

With the outbreak of World War I, Olsen had to mobilize Katanga in August 1914. On 11 September 1914 he received a call for help from George Graham Percy Lyons, district commissioner of Abercorn in Northern Rhodesia, who was being attacked by the Germans. Olsen took action since he considered the move would help protect Katanga, and his cycling battalions soon arrived in Rhodesia, where they remained until relieved by British reinforcements. During this period Olsen had to be hospitalized for dysentery. On 23 June 1915 General Charles Tombeur ordered that the remaining troops in Rhodesia prepare to leave for Kivu. On 1 August 1915 the troops had started their movement when the Germans attacked Saisi, 40 kilometres (25 mi) from Abercorn. Olsen decided to send a battalion under Gaston Heenen to defend Saisi. The troops did not resume their move to the north until 3 November 1915. Olsen again fell sick and had to remain in Elizabethville until 3 March 1916.

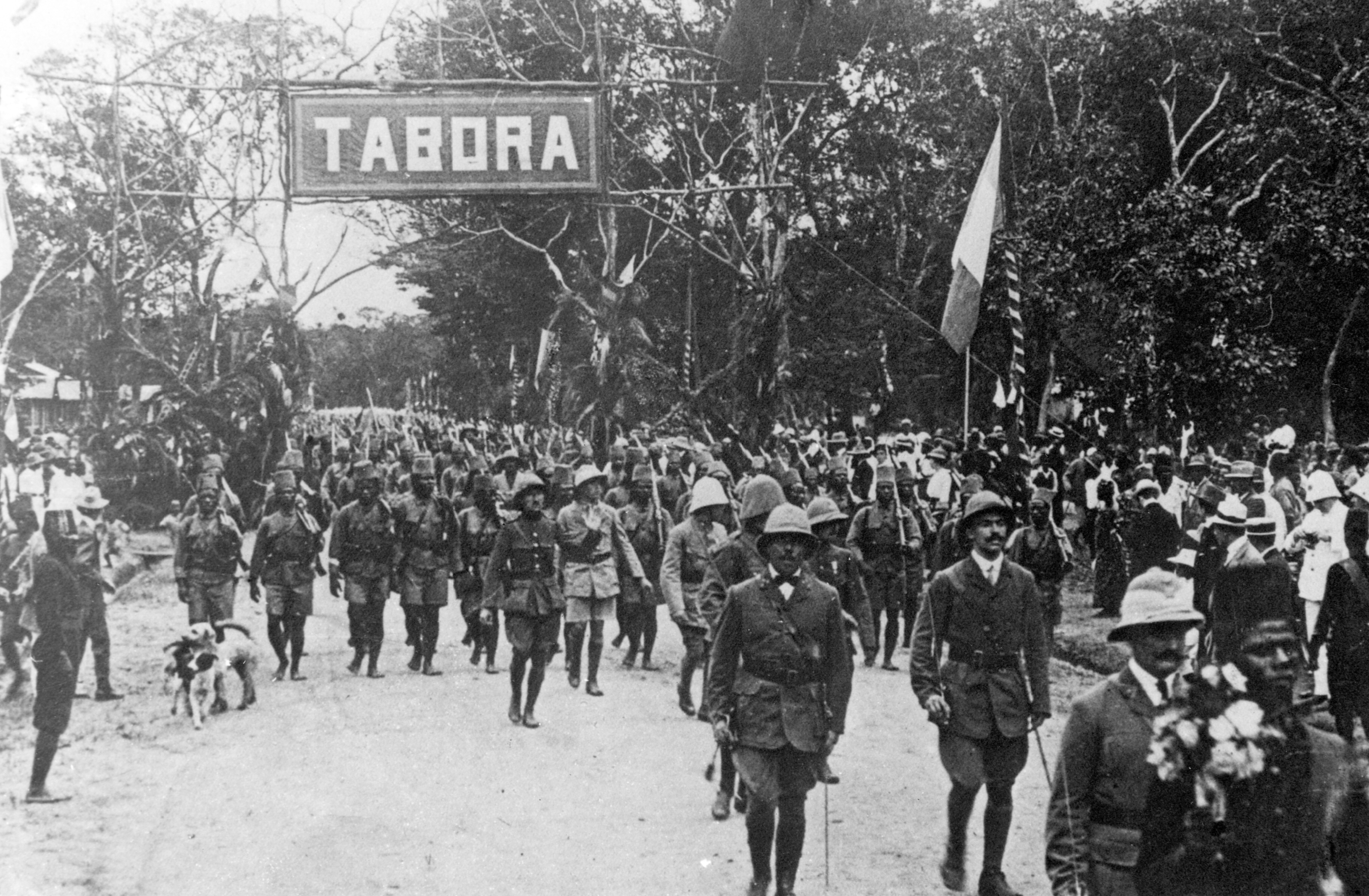
Troops under Belgian command enter Tabora on 19 September 1916

Olsen was made lieutenant colonel of 23 January 1916 and was placed in command of the southern brigade for the Tabora Offensive. He joined the southern brigade in Shangugu on 23 April 1916. The northern brigade under Philippe Molitor attacked the Germans to the north of Lake Kivu, took Kigali, but lost momentum in the march towards Mwanza on Lake Victoria due to heavy rains. The southern brigade under Olsen attacked between Lake Kivu and Lake Tanganyika, where Georges Moulaert was in command of the naval forces. Olsen quickly took Shangugu and Kitega, then returned towards Lake Tanganyika and took Usumbura. Continuing south he took Kigoma on 28 July 1916 with little opposition, since its defenses were facing the lake, which Moulaert now dominated. On 2 August 1916 Olsen took Ujiji.

In August the northern brigade occupied Maria-Hilf, then Ugaga, then Saint-Michael. The Germans retreated towards Tabora, destroying the railway behind them. Moulaert sent railway equipment by barge from Albertville, which Olsen used to repair the railway as he advanced. Olsen's brigade, advancing from Kigoma, was halted at the Malagarasi River. Around 15 August it gained a foothold on the opposite bank. Usoke station on the railway line was taken from the Germans on 30 August. The Germans made violent efforts from 2 to 6 September to retake it, but did not succeed. By the start of September the two brigades were converging on Tabora From September 10 to 12 Olsen's brigade took and defended Lulanguru, to the west of Tabora, while the northern brigade found Germans strongly entrenched in the Itaga hills. The two brigades joined on 16 September along an arc to the northwest of Tabora. Tombeur was to lead the final attack, but on the night of 18-19 September the Germans evacuated the city. Olsen continued pursuit of the Germans until ordered to halt. He gained a large part of the credit for the successful operations.

=== Post-war (1918–1925) ===
Olsen took leave in France, then returned to East Africa via the Suez Canal and Dar es Salaam. When the armistice ended the war in November 1918 Olsen resumed his command of the troops in Katanga. In 1920 the Chamber and the Senate unanimously voted to make him a fully naturalized Belgian citizen (grande naturalisation belge). The citation stated that "this brave man among all the brave men, who has spent 30 years in the Congo, has now become a great man of Belgium in heart and soul". On 22 November 1920 Olsen was appointed colonel and became commander in chief of the Force Publique, which he reorganized for peacetime duties. In September 1924 Olsen was made governor of Congo-Kasaï, based in Léopoldville. He was promoted to general on 17 April 1925 and took retirement on 25 April 1925.

== Later career (1925–1962) ==
The Minister of the Colonies, Henri Carton de Tournai, had asked Olsen to retire so he could take over management of the state-owned transportation company Unatra (Union National des Transports Fluviaux). Olsen took a vacation in Europe from 11 June to 8 December 1925. He then took office as general manager of Unatra, which had been formed by combining the shipyards and boats of Sonatra (Sociéte National des Transports Fluviaux au Congo) and Citas (Compagnie Industrielle et de Transports au Stanley Pool). He undertook various reforms to stop corruption, ensure schedules were met and improve financial management. He structured the organization into sectors based on Coquilhatville, Bumba, Bandundu and Port-Francqui. He had to struggle with local bureaucracy, and at one pointed offered his resignation to the ministry, which was refused. The C.F.L. (Compagnie du chemin de fer du Congo supérieur aux Grands Lacs africains) was impressed by Olsen's achievements and made him their general manager in Africa, in charge of transport on the Lualaba River. In 1930 Olsen contracted sleeping sickness and had to leave Africa.

Olsen remained a director of Unatra and C.F.L., and in 1936 was made managing director of Otraco (Office des transports coloniaux), formed by combining Unatra, the Matadi-Léopoldville Railway and the Mayumbe Railway. He visited the Congo between 5 November 1937 and 21 June 1938 to integrate the railway and shipping company into a coherent whole, reconciling the private enterprise culture of the railway with the civil service culture of the shipping line. During World War II (1939–1945) Olsen remained in Belgium as head of Otraco during the German occupation. After the war he launched a major expansion of the fleet. He retired in May 1947. That year the largest and most modern passenger ship on the Congo was named after Olsen.

Olsen married Harriet Meta de Stricker in Copenhagen on 17 September 1906. This marriage was dissolved. He married again on 25 July 1929 in Paris to Yvonne Marguerite Madeleine Atgier (2 February 1888 – 5 February 1962), a Frenchwoman who had been born in Algiers. Olsen died in Etterbeek, Belgium on 17 November 1962. He held the Grand Cross of the Order of the African Star, Commander of the Order of Leopold, the Royal Order of the Lion, the Order of the Crown and the Order of the Dannebrog. There was an Avenue Général Olsen in several cities. In 1953 a monument was erected in Bukavu for the force led by Olsen that had taken possession of the place for the Congo Free State.

== Publications ==
- Frederik-Valdemar Olsen (1932), "Les avatars et les desiderata de la navigation sur le Haut-Fleuve", Bull, des S. De l'L.R.C.B. (in French), III: 228–248
- Frederik-Valdemar Olsen (1947), "Emmanuel Hanssens, Notice biographique", Bull, des S. De l'L.R.C.B. (in French), XVIII: 163–167
- Frederik-Valdemar Olsen (September 1950), "Histoire des troupes du Katanga pendant la période 1910 jusqu'à l'offensive en A. O. A, pendant la première guerre mondiale", Revue congolaise illustré (in French) (9)
- Frederik-Valdemar Olsen (1951), "Décès de Pierre Leemans", Bull, des S. De l'L.R.C.B. (in French), XXII: 211–212

== Sources ==
- Delpierre, G. (2002), "Tabora 1916: de la symbolique d'une victoire" (PDF), BTNG/RBHC (in French), XXXII
- Kamp, A.; Alsted, Niels (1 November 2011), "F.V. Olsen", Dansk Biografisk Leksikons (in Danish) (3 ed.)
- Lacroix, A. (1951), Biographie Coloniale Belge, vol. II, Inst. roy. colon. belge, pp. col. 271–272
- Lederer, A. (1968), Biographie Belge d'Outre-Mer (in French), vol. VI, Académie Royale des Sciences d'Outre-Mer, pp. col. 783–790
