= Compagnie du chemin de fer du Congo supérieur aux Grands Lacs africains =

Belgian railway company in Africa

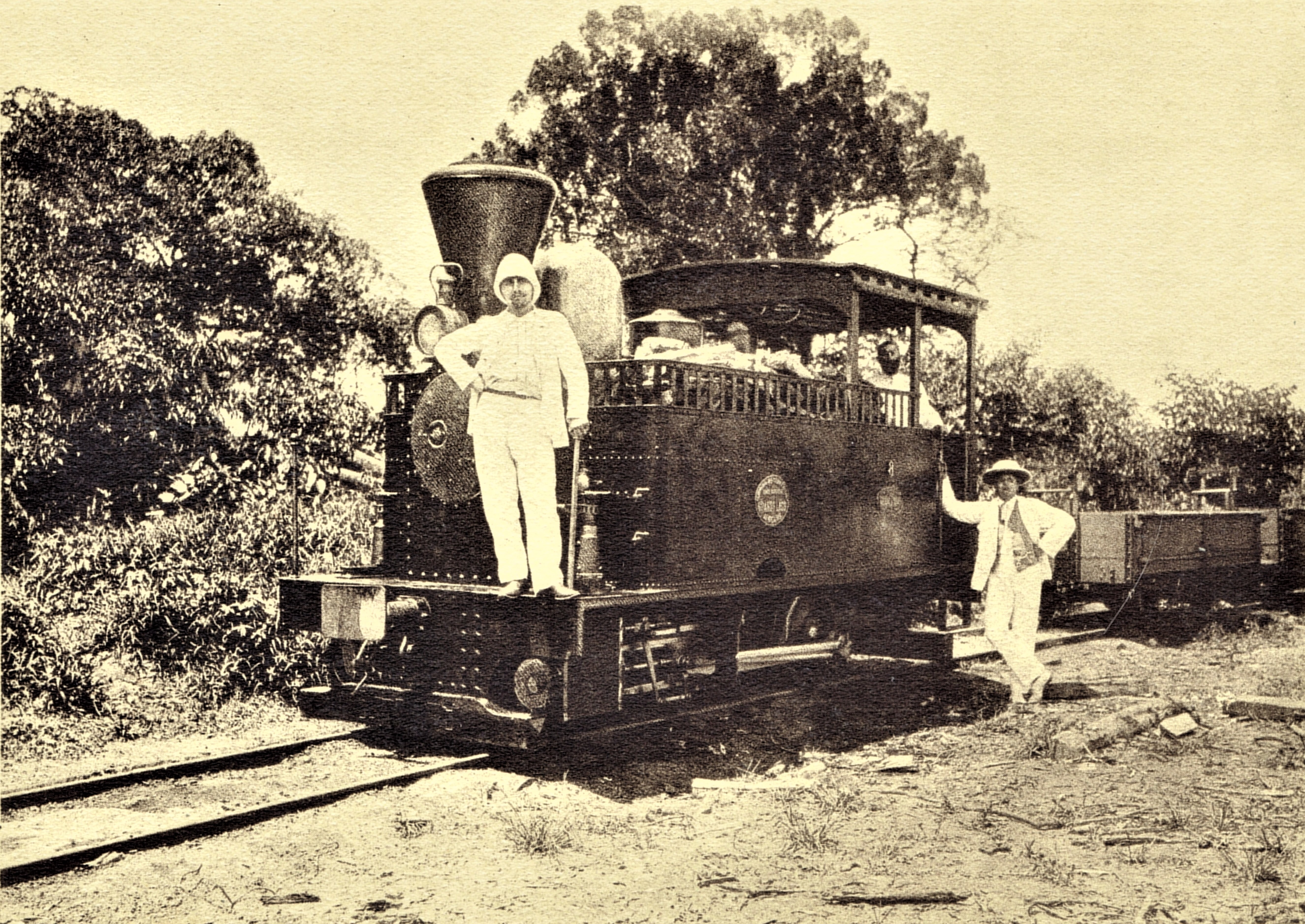
- 0-4-0ST steam locomotive of the CFL in 1910
- Trade name: CFL
- Industry: Transportation
- Founded: January 4, 1902 in Brussels, Belgium
- Defunct: 1960
- Successor: Société Congolaise des Chemins de Fer des Grands Lacs
- Headquarters: Brussels, Belgium
- Area served: Southeast Belgian Congo

The Compagnie du chemin de fer du Congo supérieur aux Grands Lacs africains (French; lit. 'Company of the Upper Congo to the African Great Lakes Railway', abbreviated to CFL) was a Belgian railway company established in 1902 in the Congo Free State, later the Belgian Congo, now the Democratic Republic of the Congo. It provided service in the eastern part of the colony south of Stanleyville (Kisangani) to serve the settlers and mining operations in Katanga. It operated a combination of river steamer service along the Lualaba River (Upper Congo River) and railway links where the river was not navigable, including a link to Lake Tanganyika. In 1960 it became the Société congolaise des chemins de fer des Grands Lacs.

== History ==
At the start of the 20th century King Leopold II of Belgium asked Baron Édouard Empain to undertake a railway project in the east of the Congo Free State. Empain founded the Compagnie des Chemins de Fer du Congo Supérieur aux Grands Lacs Africains (CFL) in 1902 with capital of 25 million francs. It was to build two railways, one connecting the Congo River at Stanleyville to Lake Albert, and the other connecting the Congo River at Nyangwe to Lake Tanganyika. The program was soon changed as the value of the mineral deposits in the Katanga Province became clear, and the main purpose became linking Katanga to Stanleyville by building railways to bypass the sections of the Lualaba River (Upper Congo) that were not navigable.

Locations in the Belgian Congo

On 4 January 1902 the Congo Free States granted the CFL a concession for four lines:

- From Stanleyville to Mahagi-Port on Lake Albert, 40 kilometres (25 mi) from where the Nile leaves the lake, a distance of 750 to 800 kilometres (470 to 500 mi). The route would cross the Upper Aruwimi region, rich in rubber vines and oil palms.
- From Stanleyville to Ponthierville (Ubundu), a distance of 120 kilometres (75 mi), linking the navigable section of the Congo River between Pool Malebo and Stanleyville with the navigable section of the Lualaba River from Pontierville south to Nsendoué (Kindu).
- From the Congo River at Kabalo to Kibanga on Lake Tanganyika, about 150 kilometres (93 mi).
- From Nsendoué to Bouli (Kongolo), bypassing the obstacle known as the Portes d'Enfer (Gates of Hell), to reach the navigable stretch of the river that extended to the heart of Katanga.

The railway line from Stanleyville to Ponthierville was begun in 1903 and inaugurated on 1 September 1906. The track mainly ran through dense tropical forest, and clearing stumps was a major effort. The Kindu-Kongolo section was built between 1906 and 1910, and was inaugurated on 1 January 1911. It included 18 bridges over rivers. In May 1911 the steamship Baron Janssens reached Bukama in the center of Katanga. The section from Kabalo to AIbertville (Kalemie) ran along the rocky Lukuga River valley, and was started in April 1911. Progress was slow, and an outbreak of beriberi at the start of 1914 caused further delays. Construction was completed in 1915, and a navigation service was established on Lake Tanganyika. Temporary wooden bridges had been replaced by permanent bridges by 1921.

In return for building its network the CFL received land and mining rights. The CFL subsidiary Compagnie Minière des Grands-Lacs (MGL) was created in 1923 to exploit the mining rights. By the 1950s the M.G.L. concessions covered more than 49,000 square kilometres (19,000 sq mi). In December 1925 General Frederik-Valdemar Olsen took office as general manager of Unatra, which had been formed by a merger of Sonatra (Sociéte National des Transports Fluviaux au Congo) and Citas (Compagnie de transports). He undertook various reforms to stop corruption, ensure schedules were met and improve financial management. The CFL was impressed by Olsen's achievements and made him their general manager in Africa, in charge of transport on the Lualaba River. The Empain Group was greatly involved in the Comité National du Kivu, which included the CFL, the colonial government and others. It was created in 1928 by Colonial Minister Henri Jaspar to encourage settlement of the region, and undertook creation of roads, railways, ports, public buildings, schools and hospitals, as well as studying the geology of the region and its agricultural and forestry potential.

In July 1937 the CFL began a line from Kongolo to Kabalo, which was inaugurated on 31 December 1939. There was now a continuous railway line from the river port of Kindu to Albertville on Lake Tanganyika. By 1950 the CFL was operating 840 kilometres (520 mi) of railway, 1,025 kilometres (637 mi) of navigation on the Lualaba and 665 kilometres (413 mi) of navigation on Lake Tanganyika. Between 1952 and 1956 the CFL built a 246 kilometres (153 mi) line from Kabalo to Kabongo. A line from Kabongo to Kamina was built by the Chemins de Fer du Bas-Congo au Katanga (BCK) for the Compagnie des Chemins de fer Katanga-Dilolo-Léopoldville (KDL). In September 1955 the CFL converted from 1,000 mm (3 ft 3 3/8 in) to 1,067 mm (3 ft 6 in) gauge to match the KDL gauge.

In 1960, during independence, CFL became the Société Congolaise des Chemins de Fer des Grands Lacs. In 1967, CFL became the Office Congolais des Chemins de Fer des Grands Lacs.

== Lines ==
Railway network of the Belgian Congo

| From | To | Length | | Opened |
| From | To | km | mi | Opened |
Rail links
| Stanleyville | Ponthierville | 125 | 78 | 1 September 1906 |
| Kindu | Kabalo | 441 | 274 | 1 January 1911 |
| : Kindu | Kibombo | 117 | 73 | January 1909 |
| : Kibombo | Kongolo | 238 | 148 | 30 December 1910 |
| : Kongolo | Kabalo | 86 | 53 | 3 December 1939 |
| Kabalo | AIbertville (Lake Tanganyika) | 272.9 | 169.6 | February 1915 |
| : Kabalo | Malulu | 116 | 72 | September 1913 |
| : Malulu | Kilometer 210 | 94 | 58 | June 1914 |
| : Kilometer 210 | AIbertville | 62.9 | 39.1 | February 1915 |
| Kabalo | Kabongo | 245 | 152 | 9 August 1956 |
River links on the Lualaba
| Ponthierville | Kindu | 320 | 200 | January 1906, middle of the river |
| Kongolo | Bukama | 640 | 400 | 1911, upper part of the river |

== Rolling stock ==
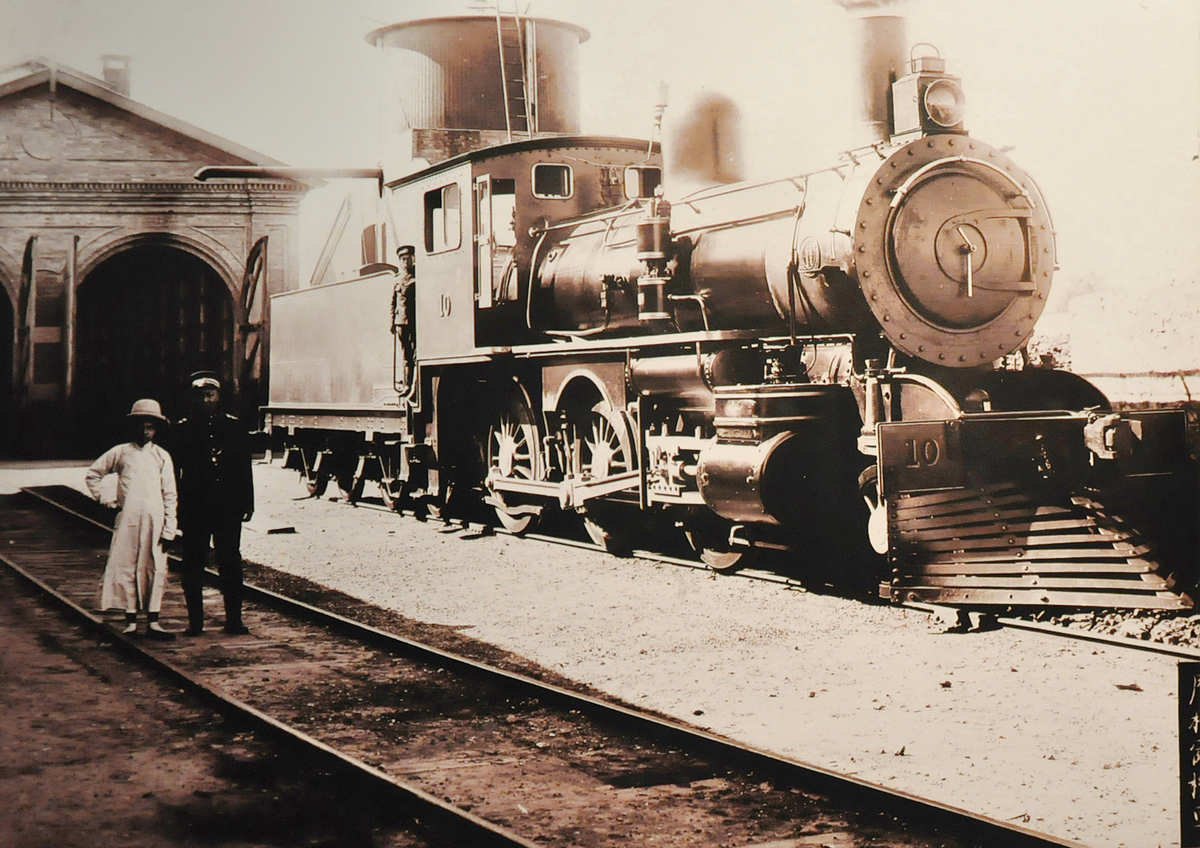
Mogul 2-6-0 in 1909

In October 1903, three 15.2-tonne 0-4-0 locomotives were ordered from the Ateliers de Tubize for use during construction of the Stanleyville-Ponthierville section. In 1905, three more 0-4-0T locomotives were ordered from the same firm for the Kindu-Kongolo section. All of them were fueled by wood, which was readily available in the Congo. Early rolling stock included 20-tonne locomotives with empty weight 11 tonnes built by Usines métallurgiques du Hainaut SA, in Couillet, Belgium.

In 1912 the company decided it needed at least fifteen 0-6-0 locomotives that could reach a speed of 40 kilometres per hour (25 mph) towing a load of 100 tonnes. The six that had been used during construction were not capable of this. In December 1912 the company ordered eight of the new 28.8 tonnes Mogul 2-6-0 locomotives with separate tenders from the Ateliers Métallurgiques de Nivelles (Ateliers de Tubize). These were more powerful than the 0-6-0 and could pull a larger load at higher speed. They went into service in 1914, one on the Stanleyville-Ponthierville section, three on the Kindu-Kongolo section and four on the Kabalo-Albertville section. At the end of 1920 the company ordered six more Moguls. In 1924 the company ordered six more locomotives similar to the Moguls but with improved boilers and larger diameter drive wheels.

Of the twenty 2-6-0 locomotives built by Les Ateliers de Tubize locomotive works in Belgium for the 1-metre CFL line, the first eight, numbered 27 to 34, were built in 1913, followed by six more in 1921, numbered 35 to 40, and then six more of a slightly larger version followed in 1924, numbered 41 to 46. They had 360 by 460 millimetres (14 by 18 inches) cylinders and 1,050 millimetres (41 inches) diameter driving wheels, with the smaller versions having a working order mass of 28.8 tonnes (28.3 long tons; 31.7 short tons) and the larger versions 33.4 tonnes (32.9 long tons; 36.8 short tons). Most of the CFL was regauged to 3 ft 6 in (1,067 mm) gauge in 1955, as were all of the serving Moguls. Most of them still survived in 1973.

In 1958 the CFL had 63 steam locomotives, 12 diesel locomotives, 64 passenger cars and 792 wagons.

== Sources ==
- "Archives du groupe Empain" (PDF), Africa Museum.be (in French)
- Carter, Reg (June 2000), Railways of the Congo (revised ed.), UK
- "Belgian Congo", Continental Railway Journal (19), UK: Continental Railway Circle
- Delporte, Luc (29 September 2017), "Chemin de Fer du Congo Supérieur aux Grands Lacs Africains", Musée de la Porte
- Lederer, A. (1968), Biographie Belge d'Outre-Mer (in French), vol. VI, Académie Royale des Sciences d'Outre-Mer, pp. col. 783–790
- N. d. I. R. (1904), "Les chemins de fer africains", Annales de géographie, 72: 427–454
- Rixke (18 January 2012), "La compagnie des chemins de fer du Congo supérieur aux Grands Lacs Africains (C.F.L.)", Rixke Rail’s Archives (in French)
- Usines métallurgiques du Hainaut (PDF), 1923
