= Unatra =

Union Nationale des Transports Fluviaux
- Trade name: Unatra
- Industry: Transportation
- Founded: March 12, 1925 in Belgian Congo
- Defunct: September 1, 1936
- Headquarters: Léopoldville, Belgian Congo

The Union Nationale des Transports Fluviaux (Unatra) was a government-controlled company that provided river transport services in the Belgian Congo between 1925 and 1936.

== Origins ==
Before 1921 the Belgian government operated transport services on the Congo River, as did various private enterprises. In 1921 the government formed the state-owned company Sonatra (Sociéte Nationale des Transports Fluviaux au Congo) to manage its river transport services. Sonatra was the successor to the Marine de Haut-Congo, which had launched its first steamer, the En Avant, on Ngaliema Bay on 3 December 1881. In March 1925 Sonatra merged with the transport operations of the private company Compagnie Industrielle et de Transports au Stanley Pool (Citas) to create Unatra (Union nationale des Transports fluviaux). The government owned 70,000 shares in Unatra out of 120,000 total.

== Early years ==
Locations in the Belgian Congo

The Minister of the Colonies, Henri Carton de Tournai, asked General Frederik-Valdemar Olsen to retire so he could take over management of Unatra. Olsen took a vacation in Europe from 11 June to 8 December 1925, then took office as general manager of Unatra. Olsen undertook various reforms to stop corruption, ensure schedules were met and improve financial management. He structured the organization into sectors based on Coquilhatville, Bumba, Bandundu and Port-Francqui. He had to struggle with local bureaucracy, and at one pointed offered his resignation to the ministry, which was refused.

The company was governed by the "Cahier des charges" agreement of 12 March 1925 which obliged it to provide service on a fixed timetable on the Congo and Kasai River, and on the navigable tributaries of these rivers. Rates were subject to government approval, even when services might have to be provided at a loss, but the government would make up any deficit. Unatra would have a monopoly on transport of goods and personnel for the state. In 1928 the company was given permission to treat the approved rates as maximums and to offer lower rates so as to compete with private companies.

In 1930 Olsen contracted sleeping sickness and had to leave Africa. Olsen remained a director of Unatra and of C.F.L. (Compagnie du chemin de fer du Congo supérieur aux Grands Lacs africains), which provided transport services on the Lualaba River.

== Great Depression ==
Railways and navigable waterways in the Belgian Congo

During the Great Depression the market collapsed for products such as timber, cocoa, coffee, rubber, cotton, palm-oil, palm nuts, native rice and sesame. Effective 1 July 1931 the government ordered drastic cuts to the rates for transporting these products to make them more competitive. The cuts would last for a period of three months, renewable if needed. These applied to Manucongo (Société pour la manutention dans les ports du Congo), Mayumbe Railway Régie, Compagnie du chemin de fer du Congo, Union nationale des Transports fluviaux et Manutention Léo, Société des chemins de fer vicinaux du Congo and the Société des Messageries automobiles du Congo. The government would reimburse the affected companies for resulting losses.

No subsidy was offered to private companies that were not regulated by the government. This gave rise to the Oscar Chinn Case in which a private company operated by a British subject, was unable to compete and brought a claim against the Belgian government that went to the Permanent Court of International Justice. The claim was rejected. However, in October 1932 the government offered to make up losses incurred by private transport companies. As of 1934 the government was still the majority shareholder, with 128.987 shares out of 243,000.

== Succession ==
Otraco Office des Transports Coloniaux) was formed on 20 April 1935 as a public institution to promote economic reconstruction after the depression. It took over the port of Boma and the Mayumbe railway authority on 17 July 1935. On 1 June 1936 it acquired the Compagnie du chemin de fer du Congo, which ran the Matadi-Kinshasa railway line. On 22 June 1936 Unatra agreed to transfer all of its assets to Otraco, effective 1 September 1936. At this time Unatra owned about 40,000 tons of river boats, barges and tugs. It operated 25 regular services, including the 1,723 kilometres (1,071 mi) line from Leopoldville to Stanleyville.

In 1936 Frederik-Valdemar Olsen, former head of Unatra, was made managing director of Otraco. Later, on 15 October 1937 Otraco acquired the Manuco (Société pour la manutention dans les ports du Congo), which operated the port of Matadi, followed by other ports and railways.

== Sources ==
- Kamp, A.; Alsted, Niels (1 November 2011), "F.V. Olsen", Dansk Biografisk Leksikons (in Danish) (3 ed.)
- Magela Kindomba, Eric milord (2008), "II. La Presentation De L'onatra", Le bon fonctionnement des entreprises publiques comme facteur du développement, cas de l'office national des transport (ONATRA) (in French), Université de Kinshasa
- Lederer, A. (1968), Biographie Belge d'Outre-Mer (in French), vol. VI, Académie Royale des Sciences d'Outre-Mer, pp. col. 783–790
- Long, W. Rodney (1939), Transport Control Abroad, Trade Promotion Series, U.S., Bureau of Foreign and Domestic Commerce
- Oscar Chinn (U.K. v. Belg.), Permanent Court of International Justice, 12 December 1934
- "Union National des Transports Fluviaux (Unatra)", Origins of Value, Yale School of Management, 2012
