= Compagnie Industrielle et de Transports au Stanley Pool =

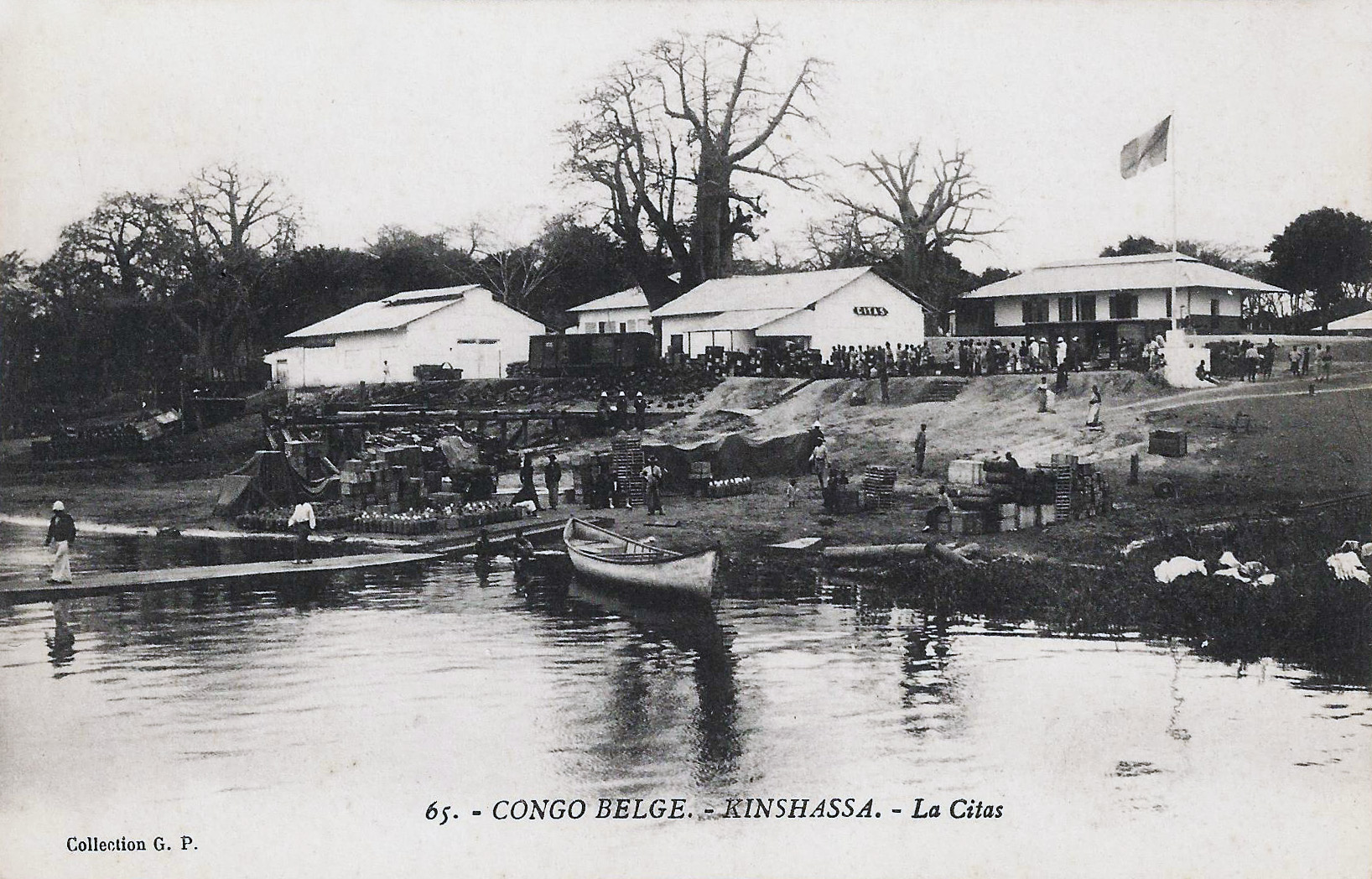
- Citas factory around 1908
- Trade name: CITAS
- Industry: Transportation
- Founded: 1902
- Defunct: 1955
- Headquarters: Brussels, Belgium
- Area served: Congo Free State, Belgian Coingo

The Compagnie Industrielle et de Transports au Stanley Pool (CITAS) was a Belgian company involved in transport on the Congo River between 1902 and 1955, in what was first the Congo Free State and then the Belgian Congo, today the Democratic Republic of the Congo. The company evolved from owning a shipyard in Léopoldville (now (Kinshasa) to providing transport services on the Congo, and then to running a port in Léopoldville.

== Shipyard and boat ==
The first Compagnie Industrielle et de Transports au Stanley Pool (CITAS) was incorporated in 1902. It was based in Léopoldville, where it owned a steamboat and operated a factory and shipyard. It also managed payments to agents of companies while they waited to leave for the upper Congo. CITAS was established on land formerly occupied by Teke people in the precolonial village of Nshasa (Kinshasa). The company was taken over by the Compagnie du Congo pour le Commerce et l’Industrie (CCCI), with headquarters in Brussels.

== Transport company ==
A new transport company named CITAS was founded in 1907, which took over the Léopoldville facilities of the Société anonyme belge pour le commerce du Haut-Congo (SAB) and the Société Belgica. The company was established on 17 December 1907 and had headquarters at 20 rue de Namur in Brussels. The botanist Franz Thonner came up from the coast by railway around the end of 1908. He was given accommodation by Citas in buildings formerly owned by SAB, and the company hired six African porters for his expedition. At that time the state employees usually stayed in Léopoldville while other Europeans such as Thonner stayed in Kinshasa.

Presidents included Albert Thys, Alexandre Delcommune and Maurice Lippens. In 1913 the three largest private transport companies in the Congo Basin formed a cartel to avoid competition. CITAS operated on the Congo River, the French Messageries fluviales took the Ubangi River and the German Kamerunschiffahrtgesellschaft took the Sangha River. In 1925 CITAS merged its river transport operations with the Sociéte Nationale des Transports Fluviaux au Congo (SONATRA) to form the new Union Nationale des Transports Fluviaux (UNATRA), which took over the shipyards and boats of the two companies. In December 1925 General Frederik-Valdemar Olsen took office as general manager of Unatra.

== Port operator ==
CITAS now focused on transport of goods and port facilities. In 1927 and 1930 CITAS made agreements with the colonial government under which it was authorized to build a quay and to occupy land for a port until 1950. CITAS built a new port in Léopoldville beside the public port. On 29 December 1931 CITAS made an agreement with the Compagnie du chemin de fer du Congo for exchange of goods between the railway and the port. This would be replaced on 30 September 1936 by an agreement with the successor company Office des transports coloniaux (Otraco). In 1932 CITAS agreed with UNATRA to take over operation of the public port, and now ran both of the Léopoldville ports. The company gave its name to the Citas neighborhood around its facility in the east end of the town, where many of its employees lived. A 1944 description of Kinshasa, to the east of Léopoldville proper, mentioned the premises of the Huileries du Congo Belge (HCB), public port, landing stage, and the docks and shipyard of Otraco at Port Citas.

In 1946 Otraco took back operation of the public port. In 1949 the government notified CITAS that it meant to take back its land concession so it could expand the public port in Léopoldville. CITAS accepted the offer after negotiations and in 1955 transferred all its properties to the local government.

== Sources ==
- Annexe au Bulletin Official du Congo Belge (PDF) (in French), 15 April 1941
- "Compagnie Industrielle et de Transports au Stanley Pool . CITAS", Africa Museum
- Gondola, Ch. Didier (2016-04-10), Tropical Cowboys: Westerns, Violence, and Masculinity in Kinshasa, Indiana University Press, ISBN 978-0-253-02080-2
- Lederer, A. (1968), Biographie Belge d'Outre-Mer (in French), vol. VI, Académie Royale des Sciences d'Outre-Mer, pp. col. 783–790
- Long, W. Rodney (1939), "Belgian Congo", Transport Control Abroad, Trade Promotion Series, Bureau of Foreign and Domestic Commerce
- Mason, K., ed. (1944), The Belgian Congo, Geographical Handbook Series, Naval Intelligence Division
- Stewart, Gary (2003), Rumba on the River: A History of the Popular Music of the Two Congos, Verso, ISBN 978-1-85984-368-0
- Thonner, Franz (1910), Du Congo à l'Ubangi : mon 2e voyage dans l'Afrique centrale (in French), Bruxelles
