= Oscar Chinn case =

Case of the Permanent Court of International Justice

The Oscar Chinn case (Britain v. Belgium). [1934], P.C.I.J. (Ser. A/B) No. 63 was a case of the Permanent Court of International Justice.

The Belgian government granted significant subsidies to a Belgian company, UNATRA, that offered transportation services in the Belgian Congo. Mr. Chinn, a British subject who operated a fluvial transport company on the Congo River could not compete (during the Great Depression) with the subsidised UNATRA's nominal prices and Britain brought a claim against the Belgian government as a matter of diplomatic protection.

The Court decided, based on the Convention of Saint-Germain 1919 and general principles of international law, that the Belgian Government did not violate any international legal obligations to the United Kingdom.
