= Paul Léon Delwart =

- Born: 18 October 1874; Braine-le-Comte, Belgium
- Died: 19 August 1900 (aged 25); Uvira, Congo Free State
- Occupation: Soldier

Paul Léon Delwart (18 October 1874 – 19 August 1900) was a Belgian officer in the Force Publique of the Congo Free State.

== Early years ==
Paul Léon Delwart was born on 18 October 1874 in Braine-le-Comte, Belgium, son of Léon Delwart and Carlotte Vandermies. He entered the Military School in 1894, and was made a second lieutenant on 18 December 1896. He was assigned to the first regiment of chasseurs à pied (light infantry).

== Congo service ==
In 1897 Delwart volunteered to serve in the Force Publique of the Congo Free State, and was accepted. He left Antwerp on 6 October 1897 and arrived in Boma on 30 October 1897. He was assigned as a sub-lieutenant of the Force Publique to the Rubi–Uele zone. He reached Djabir on 22 January 1898 and took command of the station. He developed anemia and in June 1898 was forced to return to Boma. Delwart spent a few days in hospital, then joined the battery of Fort de Shinkakasa. However, his illness had not been cured and on 25 September 1898 he left for Europe.

On 8 June 1899 Delwart left Antwerp again, with the rank of lieutenant. He arrived in Boma on 1 July 1899 and was assigned to command the special contingent of the Force Publique in Orientale Province. He travelled to Uvira (Note: The official biography states that Delwart travelled to Ujiji to take up his command, where he died. This must be an error, since Ujiji was in German East Africa. Another source notes that Delwart was in command in Uvira.) to take up his command, but developed hematuria. Delwart died in Uvira on 19 August 1900. Frederik-Valdemar Olsen replaced Delwart in Uvira as leader of the elite Belgian company in the Ruzizi–Kivu region.

== Sources ==
- Lacroix, A. (1951), Biographie Coloniale Belge (in French), vol. II, Inst. roy. colon. belge, pp. col. 271–272
- Lederer, A. (1968), "OLSEN (Frederik Valdemar)", Biographie Belge d'Outre-Mer (in French), vol. VI, Académie Royale des Sciences d'Outre-Mer, pp. col. 783–790
