= Société commerciale des transports et des ports =

Société Commerciale des Transports et des Ports
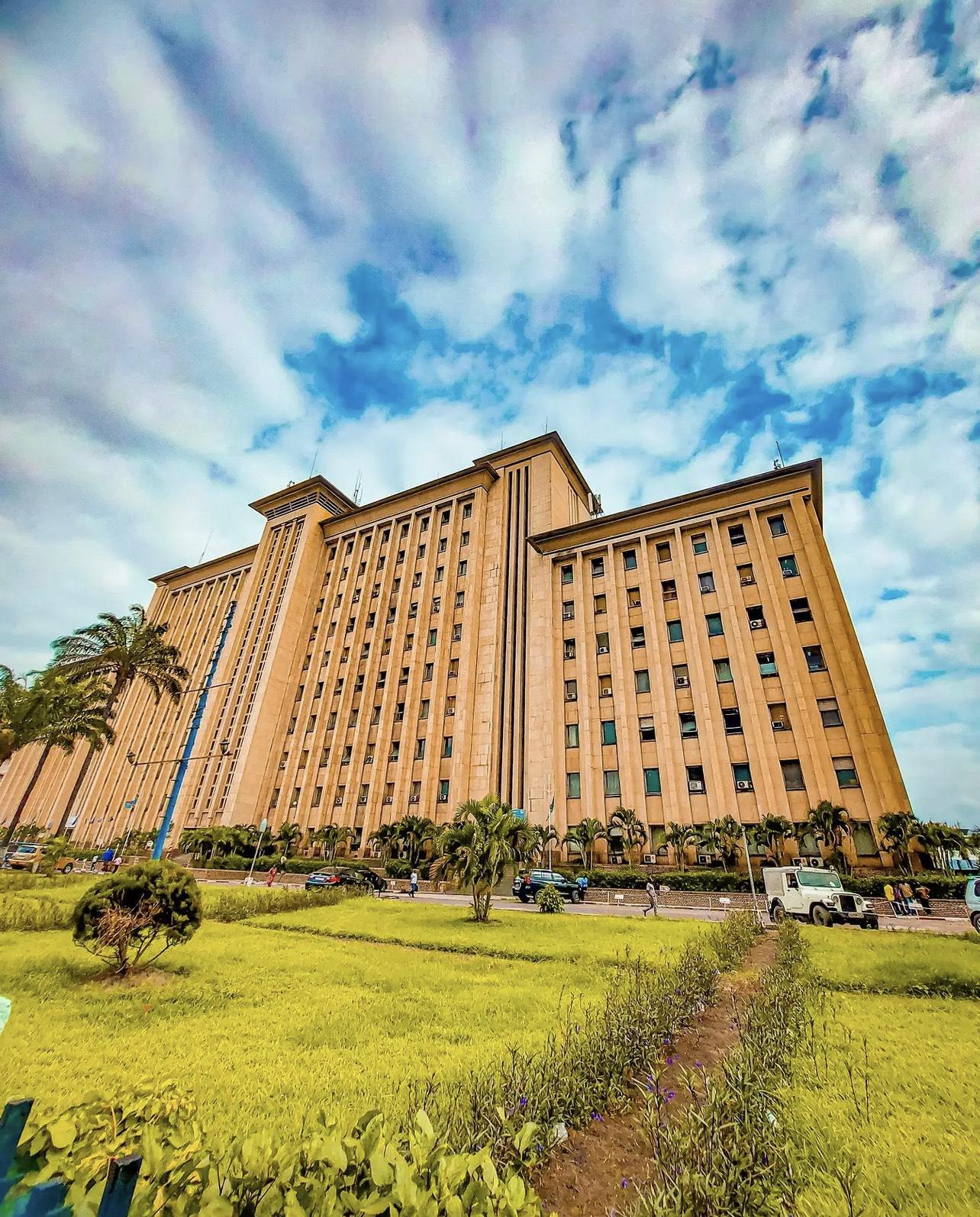
- SCPT head office in Gombe, Kinshasa
- Formerly: Office d'Exploitation des Transports Coloniaux (1935–1960); Office d'Exploitation des Transports au Congo (1960–1970); ONATRA (1971–2011)
- Type: Public
- Founded: 1935; 91 years ago
- Headquarters: Boulevard du 30 Juin, Gombe, Kinshasa, Democratic Republic of the Congo

The Société Commerciale des Transports et des Ports (Note: English: Commercial Company of Transport and Ports) (contracted as SCTP), formerly known as the Office d'Exploitation des Transports Coloniaux 1935–1959, (Note: English: Colonial Transport Operations Office) then Office d'Exploitation des Transports au Congo 1960–1970, (Note: English: Congo Transport Operations Office or the Office of Transport Operations in Congo) and Office National des Transports 1971–2011, (Note: English: National Transport Office) is a state-owned enterprise headquartered in Kinshasa. The SCTP operates railways, ports, and inland barge transport in the northern and western regions of the Democratic Republic of the Congo, along the Congo River. Established in 1935, its main office is strategically situated on Boulevard Du 30 Juin in the Gombe commune of Kinshasa.

== Functionality and organization ==
The SCTP, operating under the general regulations applicable to state-owned companies and decree-law number 0051 of 17 November 1995 governing its establishment and statutes, is structured in compliance with legal and regulatory provisions. Oversight of the SCTP's organic structures is jointly carried out by the Ministry of Transport, Communications and Rural Development in conjunction with the Ministry of Portfolio.

These structures include:

- Board of birectors
  - Chaired by a general delegate president and assisted by the deputy general delegate president.
- Management committee
  - Oversees daily operations and comprises the president-delegate-general, the deputy delegate-general, and two administrators (internal directors and a staff representative).
- General management
  - It has five members, including four administrators appointed by presidential decree and a staff representative, the general management is headed by a managing director. Its mandate is to ensure the company's operations, service, and execution of the general policy determined by the management committee.
    - In addition to the director and staff constituting the management's staff service, the management of the SCTP is structured around 11 departments divided into five operational departments and six logistical or non-operational support departments.
      - Operational departments: These departments are revenue-generating and include:
        - Maritime Ports Department (Département des ports maritimes): responsible for handling operations in the ports of Matadi, Boma, and Banana, as well as navigation on the Congo River.
        - Kinshasa Port Department (Département du port de Kinshasa): managing the port of Kinshasa and the flammable beach of Kingabwa, handling goods, logs, and sawn timber. Located on the left bank of the Congo River at the Pool Malebo, the port operates in shifts similar to the first department.
        - Railway Department (Département de chemin de fer): operating the Matadi-Kinshasa Railway line and urban rail transport in Kinshasa.
        - Department of Ports and River Transport (Département des ports et transports fluviaux): responsible for transport on the river (Kinshasa-Kisangani), on the Kasaï (Kinshasa-Ilebo), on their tributaries, and the crossing from Kinshasa-Brazzaville to Ngobila Beach.
        - Shipyard Department (Département de chantier naval): overseeing the 3 shipyards (Ndolo in Kinshasa; Boma; Boera in Mbandaka), including maintenance, careening, repair of boats, and manufacturing of new river units.
      - Logistical or non-operational support departments: These departments include:
        - Technical Department (Département technique): managing all technical sectors of operational entities.
        - Human Resources Department (Département des ressources humaines): responsible for administrative management and staff training.
        - General Services Department (Département des services généraux): overseeing real estate, construction, hospitals, social affairs, agro-food establishments, and more.
        - Financial Department (Département financier): managing the accounting and financial assets of SCTP.
        - Department of Organization and General Studies (Département de l'organisation et étudesgénérales): leading change in the company, including restructuring and the development of the company's development plan.
        - Internal Audit Department (Département de l'audit interne): ensuring prior and posteriori control, which involves accounting and financial audit, audit of functions, and operation of the general management staff, including commercial, marketing, legal, police, and central control management structures.

== History ==
=== Colonial era and post-independence ===
==== Office d'Exploitation des Transports Coloniaux ====
The Office d'Exploitation des Transports Coloniaux (OTRACO) was created by the Belgian government on 20 April 1935. Its main purpose was to manage and organize transport services in the Belgian Congo and the territories of Ruanda-Urundi. These services included handling goods, transferring them between different modes of transport, and carrying out related activities. OTRACO's establishment was not merely a bureaucratic decision but a strategic move by the colonial administration to consolidate control over the vital transportation networks crucial for economic exploitation and administrative control of the vast territories.

The first railway company subsumed under OTRACO was the government-owned Société de Chemin de Fer du Mayumbe, which had previously been administered by the Régie du Chemin de Fer du Mayumbe. The change was officially approved by a royal decree (arrêté royal) on 17 July 1935, although it applied from 31 December 1934. Later that year, on 23 November, the Minister of the Colonies issued another decree explaining OTRACO's role and powers in overseeing the railway company. Following this decision, the railway company was placed under the authority of the Administrator-General of the Colonies.

==== Expansion and consolidation ====
On 16 March 1936, the colonial government reached an agreement with the Compagnie du Chemin de Fer du Congo (CCFC) through the Minister of the Colonies to take full ownership of the railway line. This meant that the railway was nationalized. In exchange for the company's remaining shares, the government offered bonds worth 500 francs each, with an annual interest rate of 4%.

A few months later, on 22 June 1936, OTRACO expanded its activities by taking over the assets and debts of the Union Nationale des Transports Fluviaux (Unatra). This company owned many riverboats, tugboats, and barges that were used to transport goods and people across the Belgian Congo. One of its main routes covered 1,723 kilometers, connecting Léopoldville (now Kinshasa) to Stanleyville (now Kisangani). As part of the takeover, the colonial government promised to make payments to Unatra every year for 40 years. These payments were meant to cover the company's capital costs, while OTRACO took over the daily running of its transport services. A royal decree issued on 31 July 1936 officially appointed OTRACO to manage Unatra starting on 1 September 1936.

By a ministerial decree on 30 September 1936, the colony substituted OTRACO for CCFC in executing the provisions of the conventions of 3 September 1929 and 29 December 1931, respectively, between the railroad and the Société pour la Manutention dans les Ports du Congo, which managed the handling, discharge, and transshipment of freight at the port of Matadi, and the Compagnie Industrielle et de Transport au Stanley-Pool (CITAS), which held a similar concession in the port of Léopoldville.

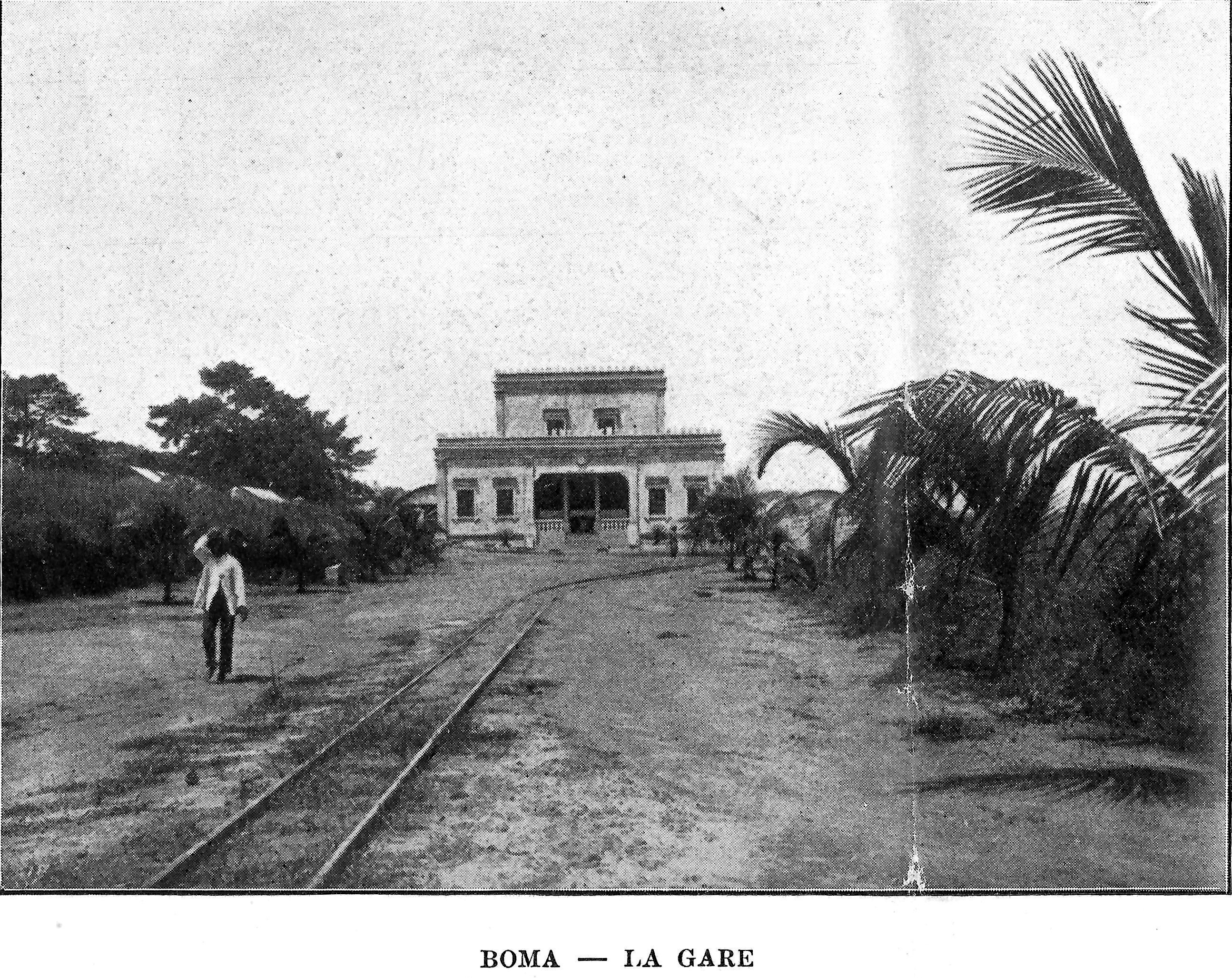
Historical view of Boma station

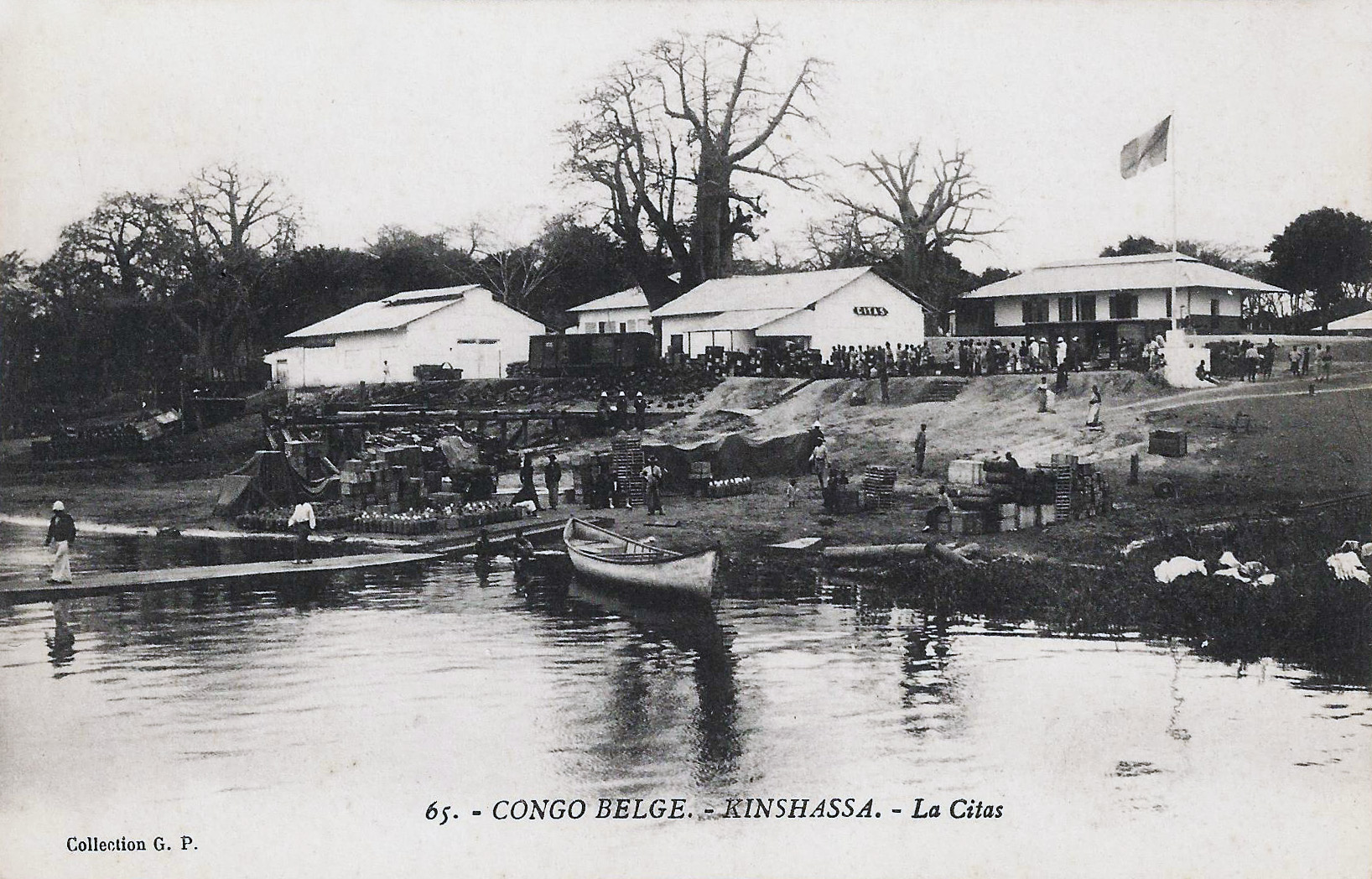
CITAS around 1908

==== From Office d'Exploitation des Transports au Congo to Office National des Transports ====
Following the country's independence in the 1960s, the entity was renamed as the Office d'Exploitation des Transports au Congo (OTRACO). Although its structure remained mostly the same, it became an important part of the country's economy. In 1961, Jacques Mbilo was appointed as the first Congolese president of the management board. The company managed a vast transportation network that included the ports of Banana, Boma, Matadi, and Kinshasa; the railroad linking Kinshasa to N'Djili International Airport; river transport on the Congo and Kasai rivers; several inland river ports; a road transport company in Kivu Province; and the Kongo Central railroads from Matadi to Kinshasa and Boma to Tshela. With so many services under its control, OTRACO became the largest employer in the country. It also supported worker training by running several schools for people preparing to work in transport.

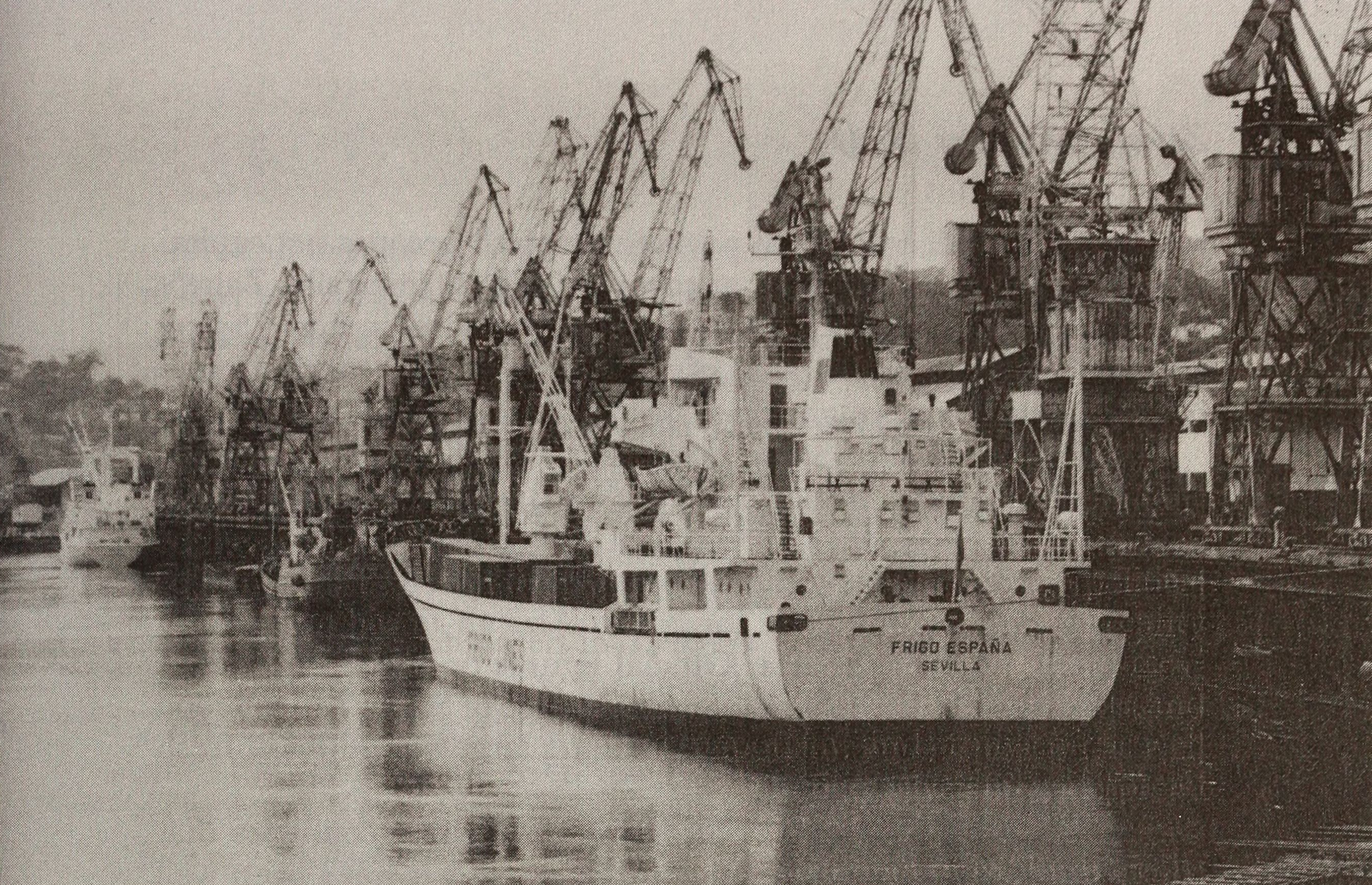
Spanish fishing boat at Zaire's main port of Matadi on the Congo River.

However, by the late 1960s, OTRACO began to face growing competition and difficulties in moving goods and passengers as the government endeavored to modernize and expand the transportation infrastructure. By 1965, OTRACO's river fleet had grown to encompass 158 powerboats and 874 barges, with a total capacity of 286,960 tons. To meet the demands of the expanding economy, the company invested in more efficient vessels in mid-1969, including three mail boats, three passenger barges, and 16 tank barges with a capacity of 450 metric tons for palm oil.

Even with these additions, the company still struggled with the movement of goods across the country, particularly the necessity to develop an all-rail route from Katanga to Matadi. The existing transportation network, reliant on transshipments, was susceptible to disruptions, including attacks by guerrilla groups in neighboring countries. To address these vulnerabilities, the government commissioned feasibility studies for a new railroad link to close the 440-mile gap between Port-Francqui (now Ilebo) and Kinshasa. The proposed link was estimated to require an investment of approximately $150 million in foreign exchange and an equivalent amount in local currency.

In 1971, OTRACO was reorganized and renamed the Office National des Transports (ONATRA). Two years later, in 1973, the company reached a record number of 410,871 passengers. However, in 1977, ONATRA lost its exclusive right to provide these services, allowing private companies to enter the shipping business. This deregulation led to a decline in passenger traffic, with only 121,779 passengers transported in 1982. As of 1982, ONATRA maintained a substantial operational fleet comprising 280 barges, 255 light barges, 85 tugboats, and 62 vessels designated for passenger service. In April 1991, ONATRA was reorganized into three parts: Holding, the Office de Transport et de Port (OTP), and the Office de Chantier Naval (OCN). However, the transitional government of Zaire later decided to dissolve Holding ONATRA and bring its groups back together under one ONATRA organization before 1991. Later, the Second Congo War caused additional problems for river transport, forcing operations along the Congo River beyond Mbandaka to stop.

In July 2005, ONATRA also faced serious congestion at the port of Matadi. The problem was made worse by old equipment and more than 4,000 containers piling up at the port. Anatole Kikwa Mwata Mukambu, ONATRA's deputy commercial director in Matadi, described the congestion as "artificial", indicating that it was not caused only by poor transport management but also by other external factors. The introduction of new machinery and resolutions implemented towards the end of the year ultimately alleviated the port's congestion issues.

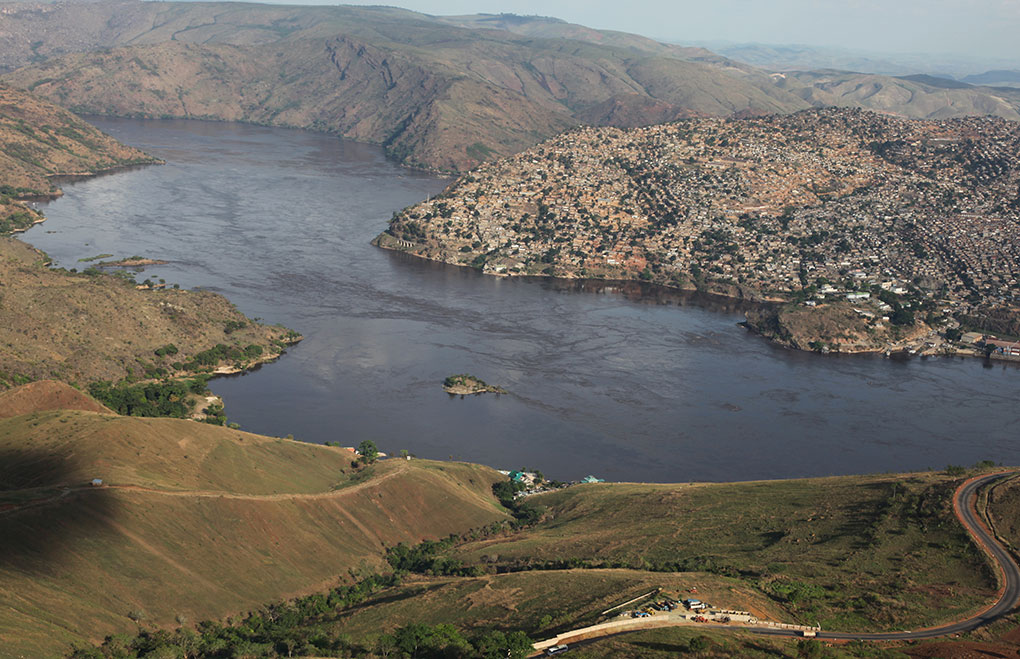
Aerial view of Matadi

In June 2006, Eva Mwakasa, the Minister of Transport, Communications and Rural Development, suspended ONATRA's Management Committee. She claimed that the committee had failed to meet workers' demands, especially those related to salary increases and housing. However, Célestin Vunabandi Kanyamihigo, the Minister of Portfolio, disagreed with this decision. He argued that the appointment or removal of a management committee should be based on a government decision or discussions between the ministries responsible for technical and administrative oversight. This decision led to a major division among ONATRA's staff. Some employees supported the new committee appointed by Mwakasa, claiming that the former leaders had managed the company poorly and misused its money. Others disagreed with the suspension and opposed the changes in management.

The situation became more difficult in July 2006, when ONATRA workers went on strike after a presidential decree gave Office des Douanes et Accises (OFIDA) exclusive control over the collection of import taxes and fees at Matadi Port. This meant that OFIDA became the only body responsible for handling these payments from importers and exporters. Before the decree, ONATRA and other public organizations had also collected taxes and fees at the port. Under the new system, ONATRA could only receive a share of the money to cover its operating expenses. As a result of the strike, all port activities stopped for one week. After work resumed, around 3,000 tons of goods and 35 vehicles were cleared.

In August 2006, a ship arriving from Kinshasa docked at ONATRA's public port in Kisangani, marking the first arrival of its kind in a decade, and this marked the return of river transport between the Tshopo province and Kinshasa, with the ship carrying roughly fifty passengers and 2,000 tons of essential goods. Despite challenges such as inadequate buoyage and dredging, the return of transport services was expected to support trade and economic growth in the area. In February 2007, another strike hit Matadi Port, spurred by discontent among workers over the Managing Director's refusal to engage in negotiations concerning demands related to precautionary measures for agent recruitment and the disbursement of "mileage allowances". This industrial action effectively paralyzed port and station activities, with three-quarters of ONATRA's services, including those of OFIDA and OCC (Office Congolais de Contrôle), grinding to a halt, leaving only import and export services operational.

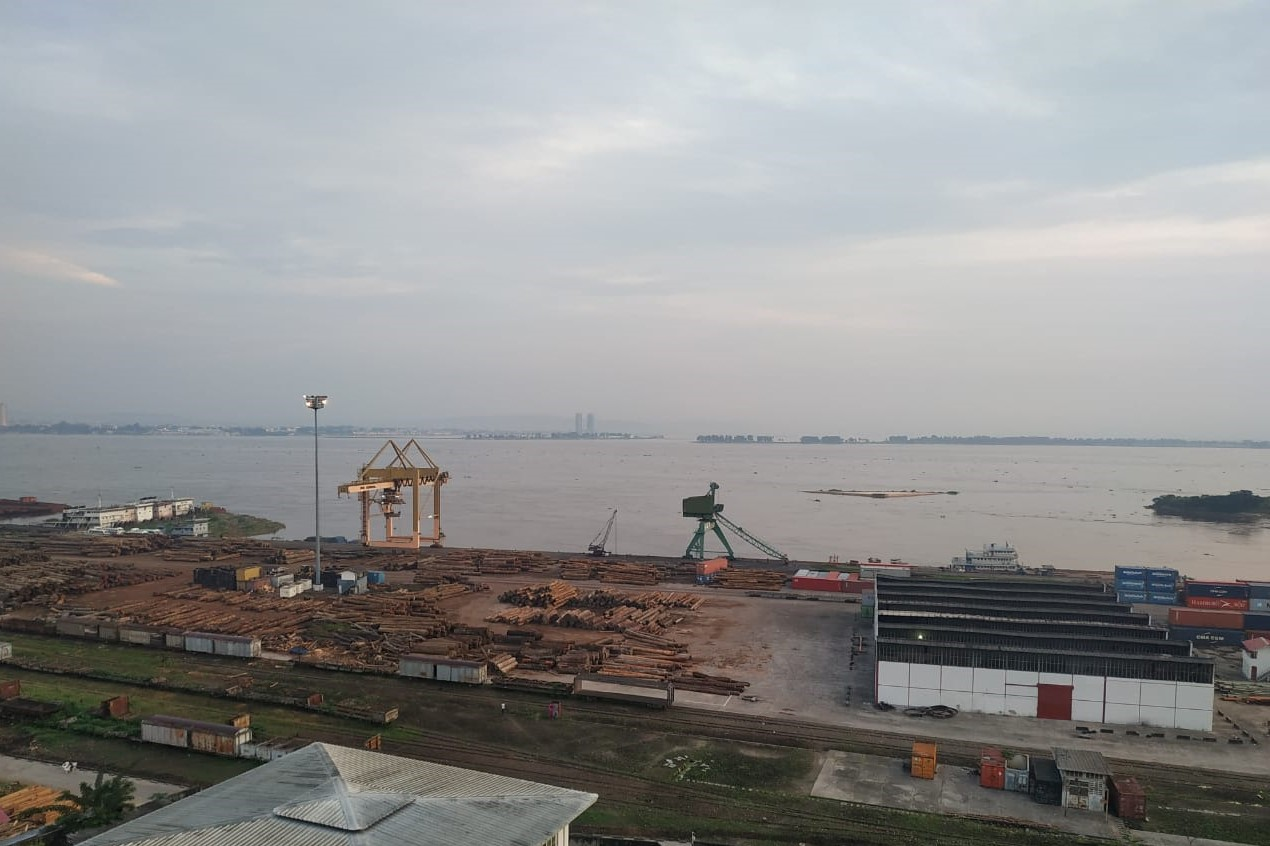
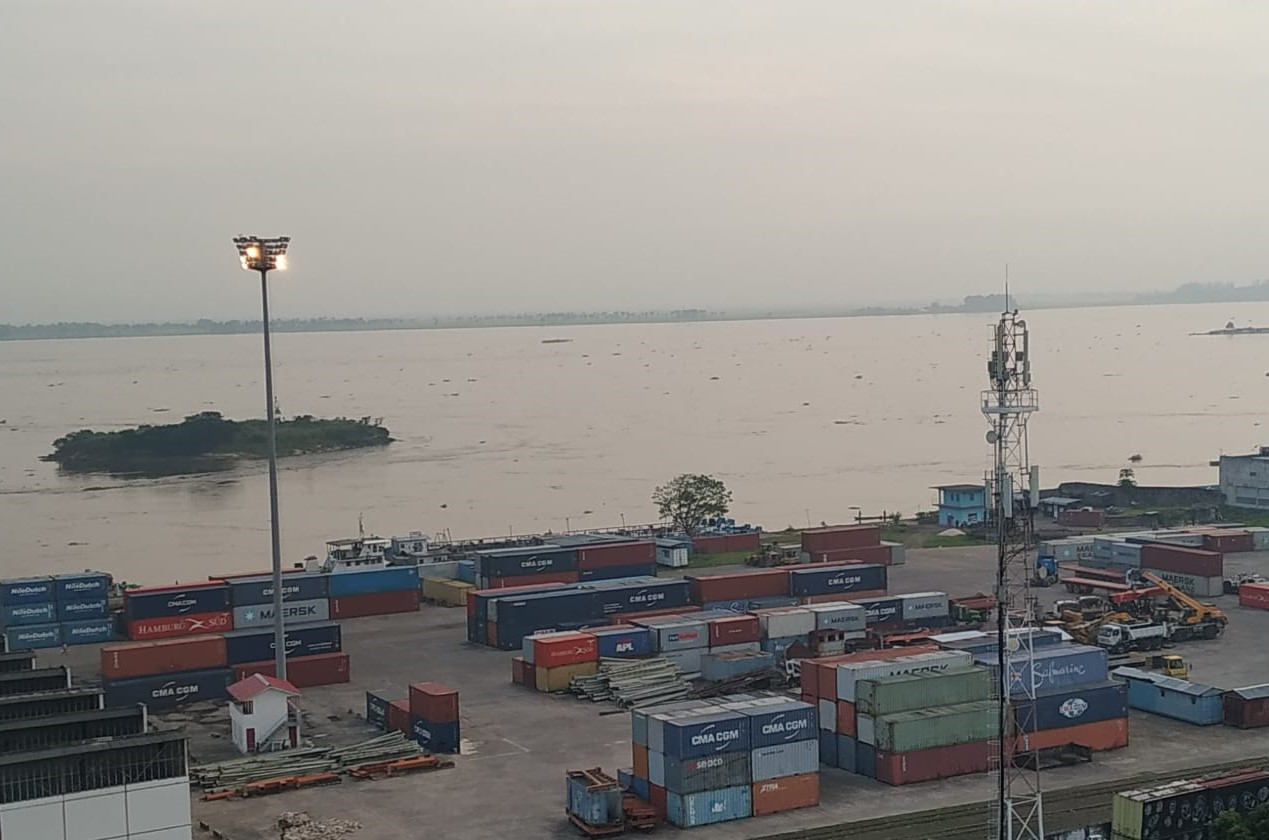
Terrace view of the Congo River and ONATRA Port in Kinshasa

In November 2007, the provincial governor of Kongo Central officiated a ceremony commemorating the acquisition and commissioning of new equipment at Matadi Port. This procurement, financed through ONATRA's resources, constituted a substantial investment of approximately $14 million. The newly acquired machinery, displayed in front of ONATRA's administrative building at the port, comprised thirty-six Dasson-brand elevators, each with a lifting capacity of up to four tons. This procurement was part of the second phase of machinery enhancements, which also included a 45-tonne self-crane and ten additional elevators already operational at the port. The following month, ONATRA and Société Nationale des Chemins de fer du Congo (SNCC) were integrated under unified management pursuant to a governmental reorganization initiative. ONATRA entered into a strategic partnership with the Franco-Spanish firm Progoza, while SNCC collaborated with the Belgian railway operator Vecturis. This endeavor aimed to modernize both companies through technical assistance contracts, without resorting to privatization. However, this move elicited concerns among employees, particularly at ONATRA, over the absence of consultations and the potential ramifications for job security. Minister of Portfolio Jeanine Mabunda reassured that the Congolese State would retain ownership, emphasizing that the partnerships were solely focused on enhancing management and operational efficiency. During this period, Progosa's managers worked in tandem with Congolese officials to address the company's challenges.

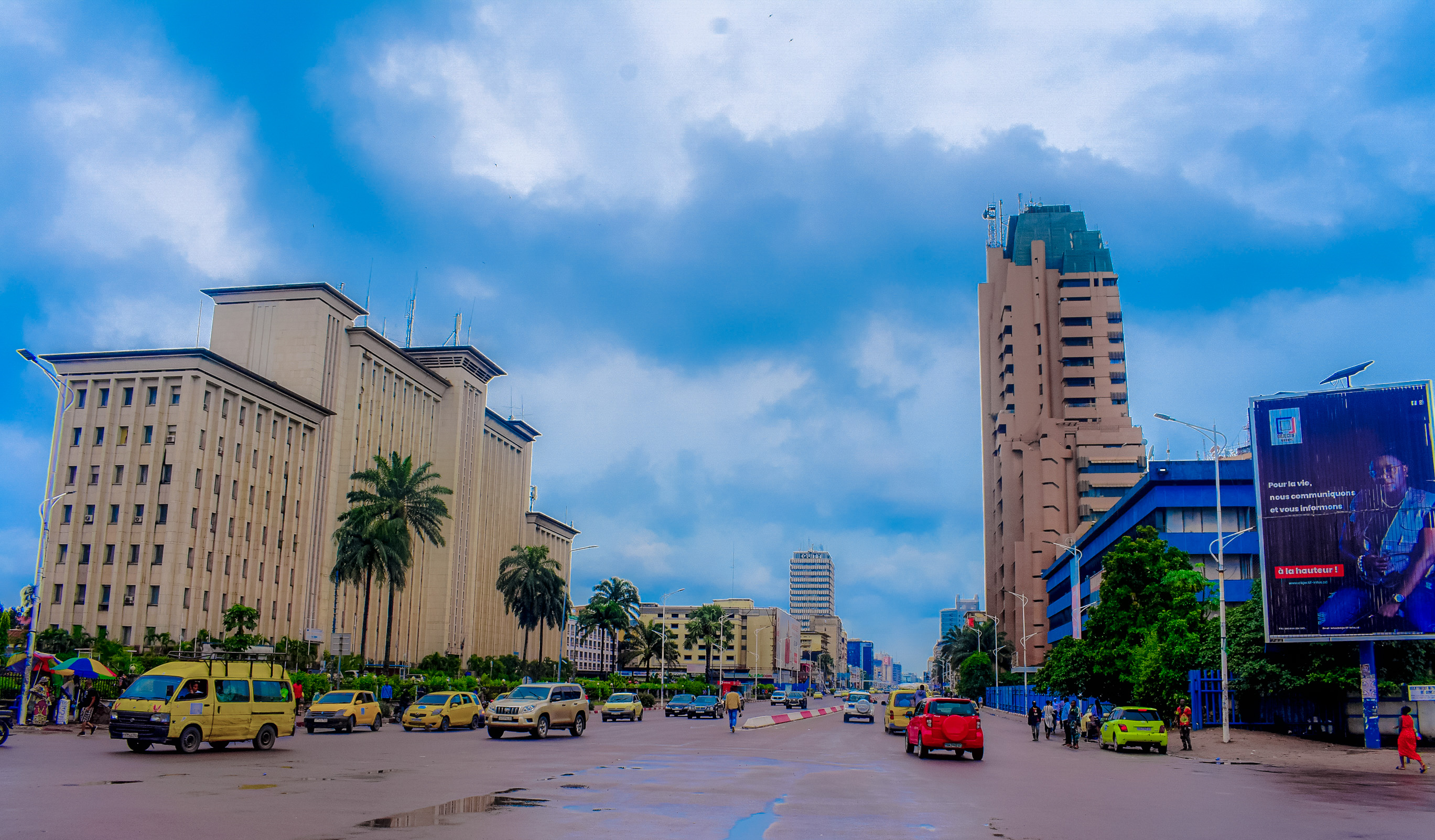
SCPT headquarters building (left) in Gombe, Kinshasa

In 2008, the Boyera Shipyard in Mbandaka, ONATRA's second shipyard in the country following N'dolo in Kinshasa, encountered substantial difficulties as its dock had been relocated to Kinshasa earlier that year for boat repairs. In May 2008, a team of Congolese and expatriate leaders proposed by Progosa, including the Managing Director and the Technical Director, was appointed to oversee ONATRA's stabilization. The stabilization initiative targeted ONATRA's critical condition, characterized by an aging workforce, obsolete and malfunctioning equipment, and a financial model that was draining state resources without contributing effectively. Progosa's mandate was to restructure ONATRA over the ensuing two years. The Comité de Pilotage de la Réforme des Entreprises Publiques (COPIREP) commended Progosa for its expertise and underscored the urgent need for reform. Nevertheless, the ONATRA union expressed concerns about the firm's familiarity with the company and criticized the significant salary disparities between expatriate and Congolese employees, alleging that the contract terms were disproportionately favorable to expatriates. Sylvestre Ilunga Ilunkamba, head of COPIREP, acknowledged the governance issues at ONATRA, emphasizing that the objective was not to overhaul the company entirely but to stabilize operations and halt its financial decline. In January 2009, in response to ONATRA's request to accelerate the loading and unloading processes at Matadi, the Flour Mill of Matadi S.A. (Minoterie de Matadi S.A.; Midema), commissioned in 2005, was inaugurated on 14 February 2009, at a total investment of nearly $15 million. This terminal was anticipated to alleviate the load on Matadi Port. ONATRA's employees consistently received one month's salary out of the twenty-three months of arrears after expressing their grievances to the national Ministry of Portfolio, the provincial governor, and ONATRA's financial director in Kinshasa. However, other workers at Matadi Port halted operations, demanding the initiation of a social dialogue with the employer regarding the issue of agent retirement and the adjustment of workers' salaries concerning the real exchange rate of the national currency against foreign currencies.

The alliance between ONATRA and Progosa was dissolved on 7 March 2010. Following this, a delegation representing the entirety of the workforce called "union" was formed. The delegation voiced profound dissatisfaction with Progosa's two-year stewardship, citing a financial deficit amounting to eleven million dollars, ostensibly allocated for the procurement of four new locomotives. It was further observed that at the onset of Progosa's mandate, only two locomotives remained operational out of the original fleet of six. In May 2010, a shipment of 10,824 tons of semolina from Japan arrived at Matadi Port, with a portion of this cargo already being transacted at ONATRA's facility in the Matete commune. Within that same month, the company financed the rehabilitation of the fourth quay at the Port of Matadi, a project which reached completion the following year at an estimated expenditure of approximately two million US dollars. A gubernatorial decree from the Governor of Équateur, issued on 13 July 2010, imposed a prohibition on vessels docking at private ports in Mbandaka, mandating that all such vessels must henceforth berth at ONATRA's newly renovated public port in Kinshasa, which had been restored by the Entreprise Générale Malta Forrest (EGMF).

==== Société Commerciale des Transports et des Ports ====
In December 2010, ONATRA was reconstituted as a limited liability company and renamed Société Commerciale des Transports et des Ports (SCTP). The new corporate statutes were officially ratified on 24 December. On 7 February 2011, SCTP received an acquisition of 13 new passenger railcars in Kinshasa, a procurement made possible through a collaborative venture between the Congolese government and the Belgian Technical Cooperation. In August 2012, Beach Ngobila in Kinshasa, a critical port for passenger embarkation and disembarkation traversing the Congo River between Kinshasa and Brazzaville, was transferred under SCTP's jurisdiction. In that same month, Republic of the Congo enacted a closure of its land and river borders with the Democratic Republic of the Congo in observance of the 52nd anniversary of its independence, which significantly exacerbated the prevailing port congestion at Beach Ngobila.

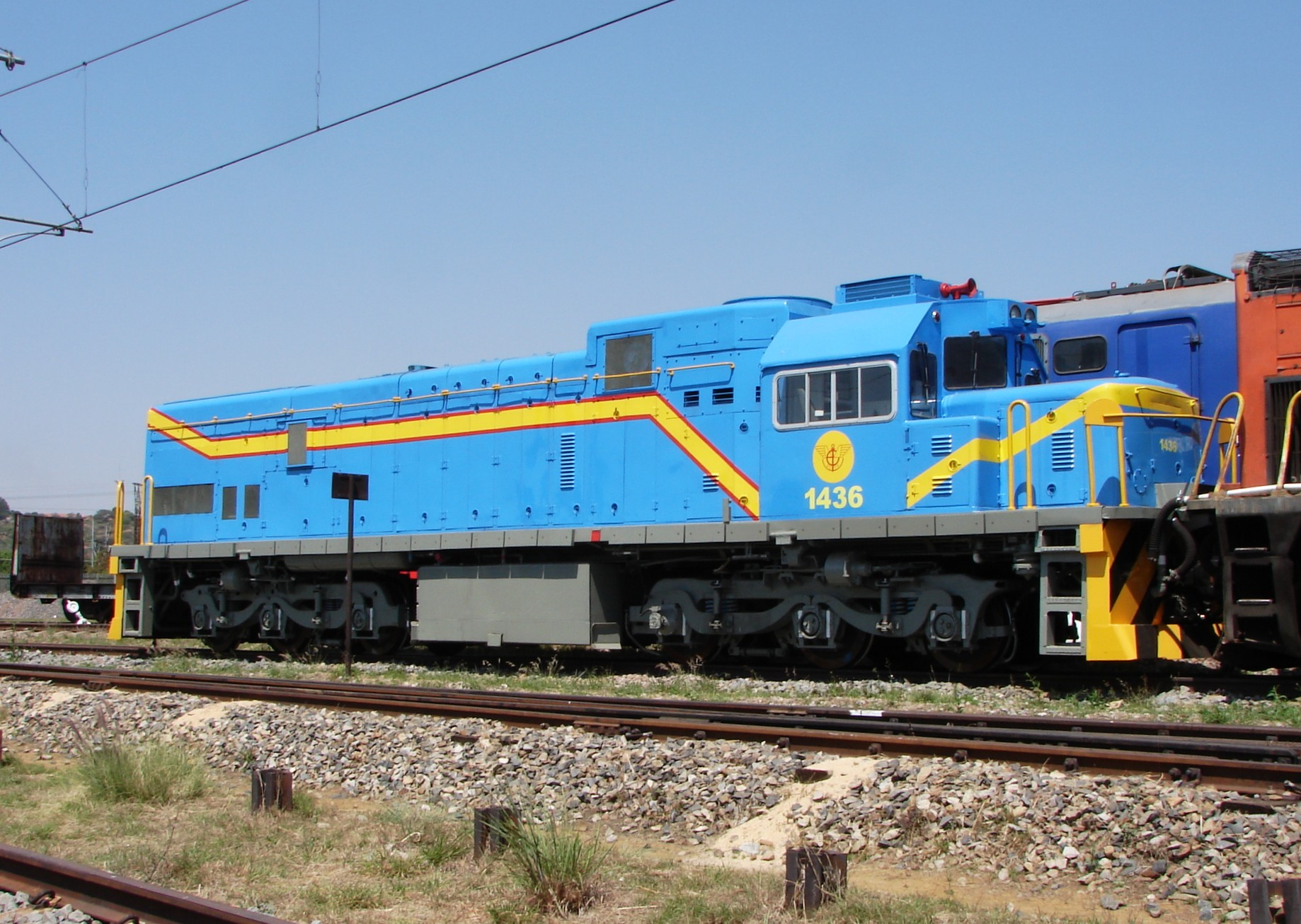
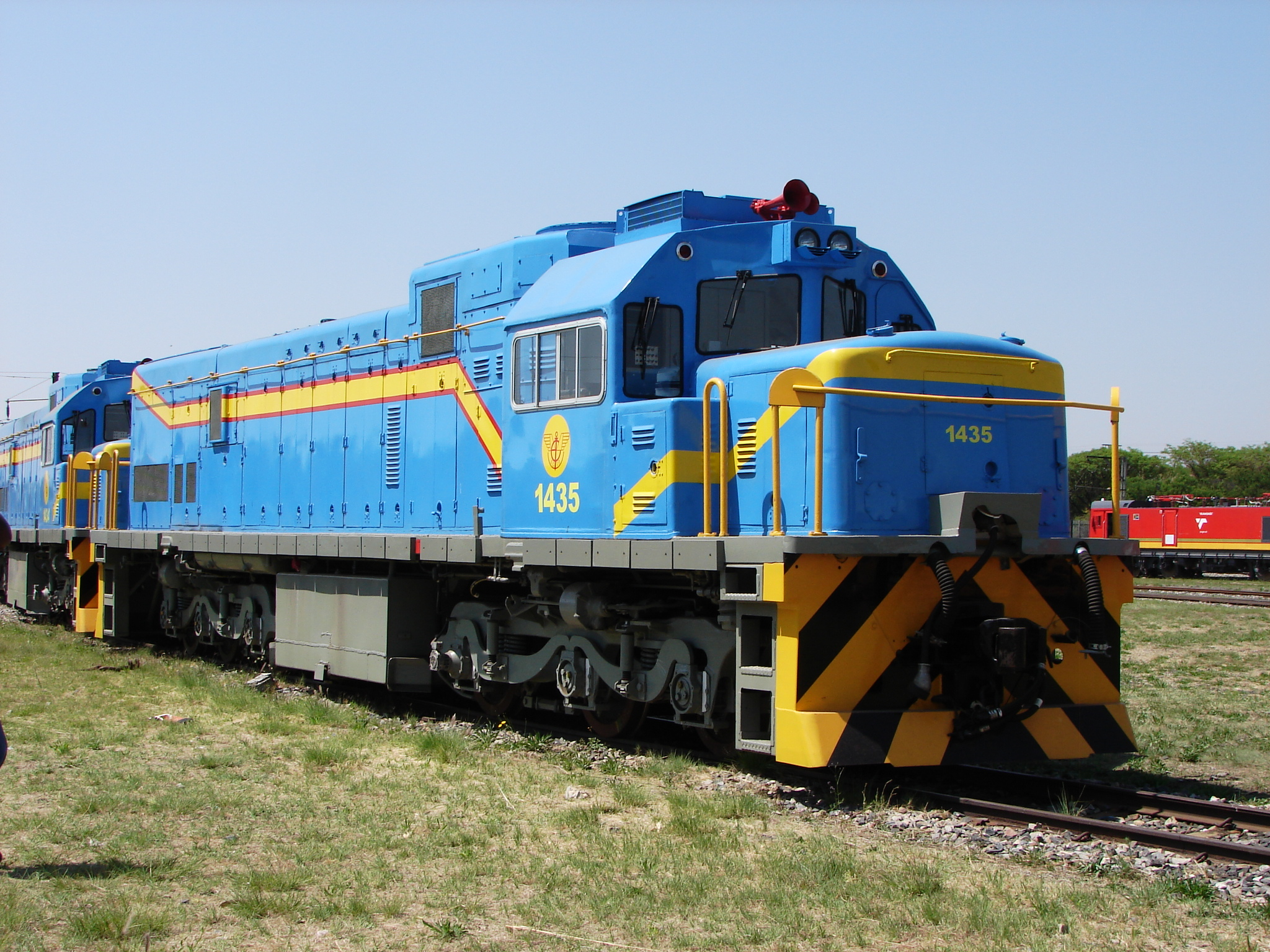
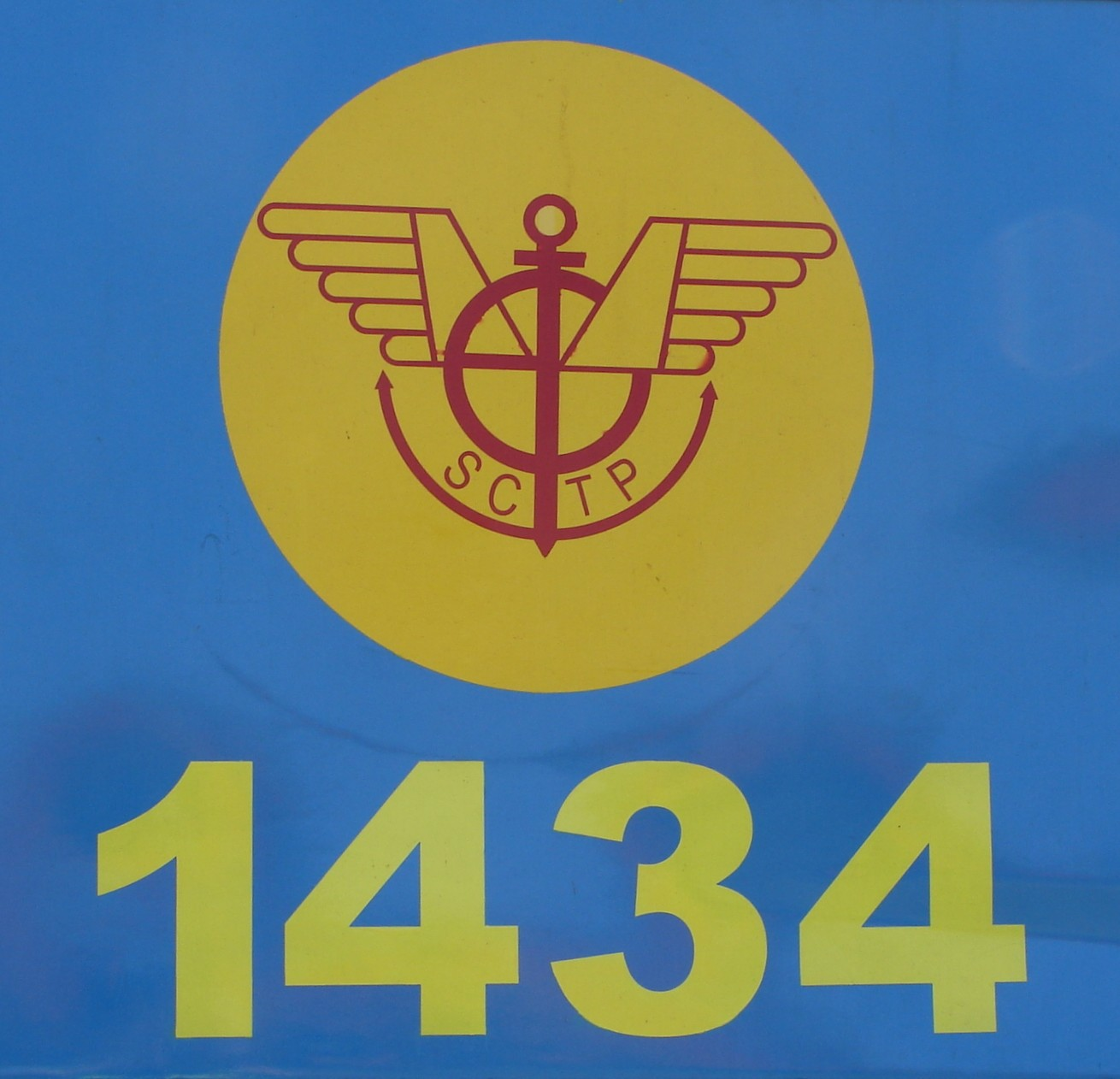
South African Class 33-000, sold to SCTP and numbered 1436

After more than a decade-long hiatus, SCTP heralded in September 2013 the recommencement of urban train services on the Kintambo Central Station line, alongside the ongoing advancement of various railway infrastructure projects. The following year, in May, SCTP procured three new reconditioned locomotives, sourced from South Africa by the Congolese government, to facilitate freight operations between Matadi and Kinshasa. These two locomotives, each with a price tag of $1.3 million, could haul approximately 800 tons, in stark contrast to the outdated SCTP locomotives, which had a capacity of between 350 and 400 tons. That same month, SCTP reported a precipitous decline in revenues from Congo River crossings, which plummeted from 10 to 2 million Congolese francs (approximately 10,840 to 2,168 US dollars) per day since the commencement of the "Mbata ya mikolo" operation—a mass expulsion of approximately 100,000 Congolese nationals from Brazzaville, initiated in April 2014. The residual two million francs were generated solely by fast boat services, as the ferry crossing was predominantly free and almost exclusively one-way, from Brazzaville to Kinshasa. On 19 June, thirty-eight "illegal" taxes within the river and lake sectors of the Democratic Republic of the Congo were abrogated by an interministerial decree endorsed by nine government officials.

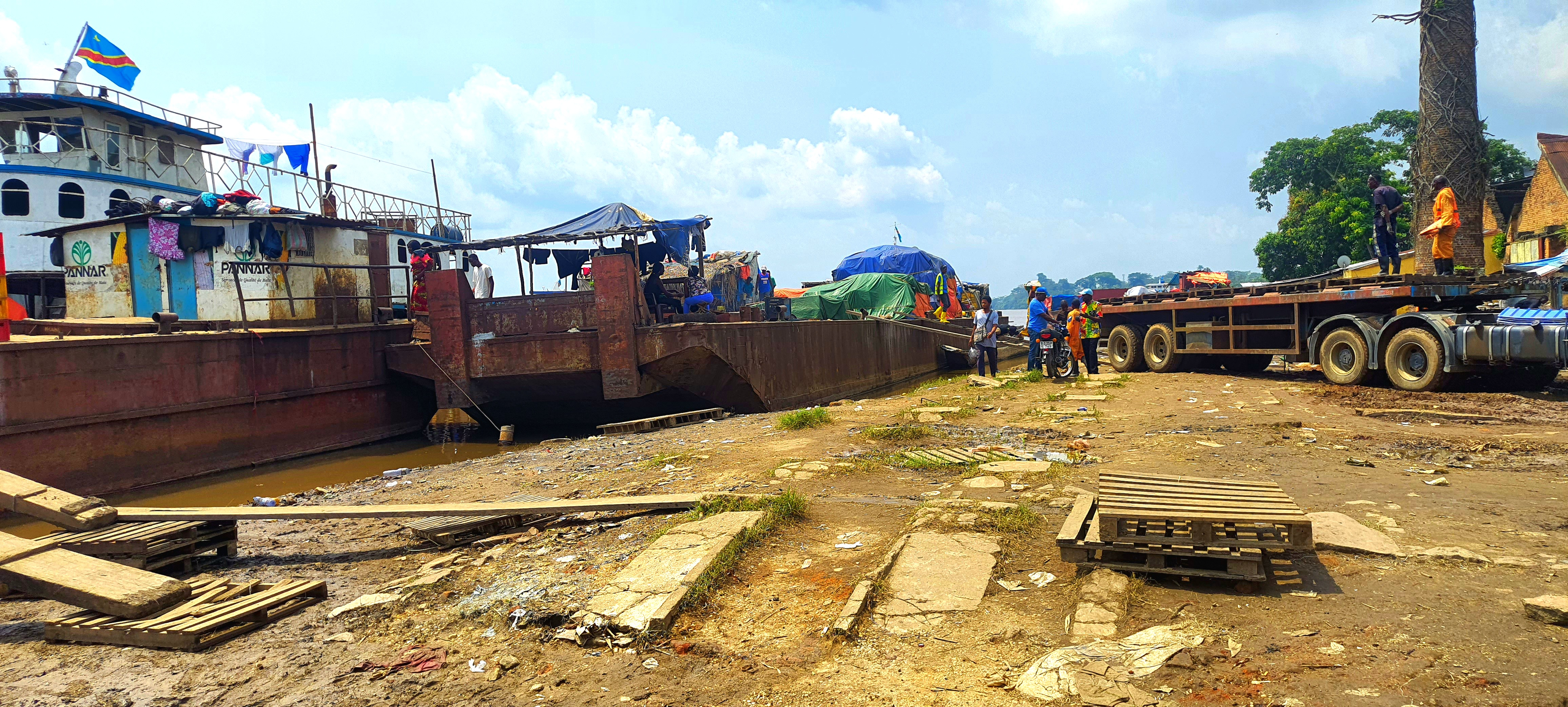
Port of SCTP Kisangani

After undergoing rehabilitation since 8 January 2013, initiated by the Minister of Transport and Channels of Communication, Justin Kalumba, and financed by the Congolese Government at a cost of 2.5 million US dollars, SCTP's ITB Kokolo vessel was unveiled on 7 February 2015 by President Joseph Kabila, intended for the conveyance of passengers and cargo along the Congo River between Kinshasa and Kisangani, with stopovers in Mbandaka, Lisala, Bumba, and Basoko. The vessel embarked on its maiden voyage on 16 April 2015, departing Kinshasa for Kisangani, with subsequent port calls in Mbandaka on 21 April, before finally docking at SCTP's port in Kisangani on 29 April after a 13-day voyage, and later departed the port with approximately 1,200 tons of goods bound for Kinshasa.

As part of executing the Multimodal Transport Project (Projet de Transport Multimodal) in collaboration with the Congolese government and its partners, designed to improve regional access in the Democratic Republic of the Congo to promote economic unification, the SCTP marked the relaunch of Matadi–Kinshasa Railway traffic on 22 August after a seven-year hiatus, with the aim to speed up port goods clearance and enhance the sale of local agricultural products by residents near the railway stations to train passengers. On 15 June 2016, a new seaport called "Mbengu Matadi", commercially known as Matadi Gateway Terminal (MGT) was inaugurated in Matadi on the far left of the Pont Maréchal (now Matadi Bridge) along the Congo River, featuring a quay finished in heavy concrete, a landing stage, and two multi-storey buildings. The first ship docked at the port during its inauguration.

On 6 December 2020, SCPT's president, Armand Ossasse, issued a statement condemning the redirection of seven ships to private ports, where they docked without oversight and evaded tax payments, urging the government to shut down all unauthorized and clandestine private ports. In the prior month, approximately eighteen ships were redirected to private ports, and later in December, seven more ships were diverted, causing a significant financial loss for the SCPT. He also demanded the settlement of 33 months of overdue salaries and the recovery of a $207 million debt from the Congolese state. However, earlier on 20 August of that year, President Félix Tshisekedi had instructed the Minister of the Interior, the Minister of Justice, and the Minister of Transport to take action and implement the decisions to shut down all illegal ports in Kongo-Central, but no action was taken. The next year in October, ninety-seven out of one hundred and twenty containers of equipment meant for building the Cimenterie de la grande Province Orientale (CIPOR) disappeared from Kinshasa. Only 23 were discovered at the SCPT's port.

On 19 January 2022, the Minister of Transport, Chérubin Okende Senga, and the governor of Kinshasa, Gentiny Ngobila Mbaka, formalized the creation of a new transport company, Métro-Kin, with the signing of its constitutive act in Kinshasa, tasked with the challenge of revitalizing, modernizing, and managing the 300-kilometer-long railway system in Kinshasa under SCTP's oversight. In August 2022, SCTP initiated a refurbishment program for more than 20 boats to serve the Mbandaka, Kisangani, Kasaï, and Sankuru river routes, with the newly restored M/B Luberu ship set to sail from Kinshasa to Mbandaka, accompanied by a passenger barge and three cargo vessels for goods.

In August 2023, the company received the claimed $207 million and appealed to the new Management Committee to reinstate river transportation in the country with ten vessels and 20 barges, as well as the recommencement of express and cargo rail services between Kinshasa and Matadi. SCTP's newly renovated quay at the Port of Matadi welcomed its inaugural commercial ship in December 2023, loaded with 6,000 tons of goods, which bodes well for the upcoming commercial season.

== Network ==
The network includes:

- Matadi-Kinshasa Railway, under an agreement with the Congo Railroad Company;
- Rivers and lakes network
  - From Boma to Banana (ferry Kalamu);
  - River Congo and Kasai River (and their tributaries);
- Ports
  - Ocean ports of Matadi and Boma
  - River ports Kinshasa, Mbandaka and Kisangani

== 2022 fire damages on the SCTP headquarters ==
On 25 July 2022, a conflagration of "unknown origin" beset a section of the edifice housing the SCTP's principal offices. While the exact cause of the fire remains enigmatic, reports from Ouragan.cd suggest that the inferno erupted at 1:00 a.m. Actualite.cd reported that the fire ravaged the windows and "unrecognizable sections of the imposing building." A contingent of firefighters quelled the flames, while police officers were deployed on the ground to cordon off the disaster scene.

== See also ==
- Rail transport in the Democratic Republic of the Congo
- Transport in the Democratic Republic of the Congo
