= Franz Thonner =

Austrian taxonomist and botanist (1863–1928)

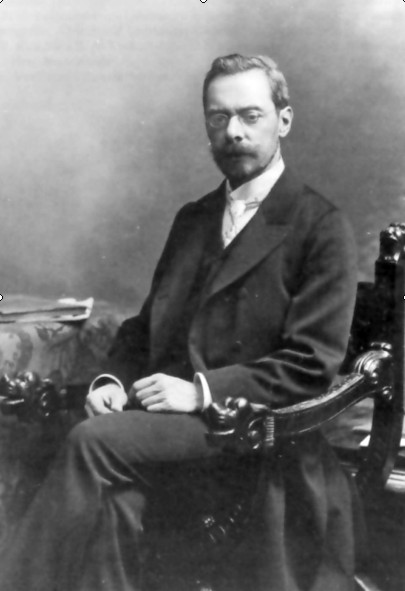
Vienna 1910 (photograph by Ludwig Grillich)

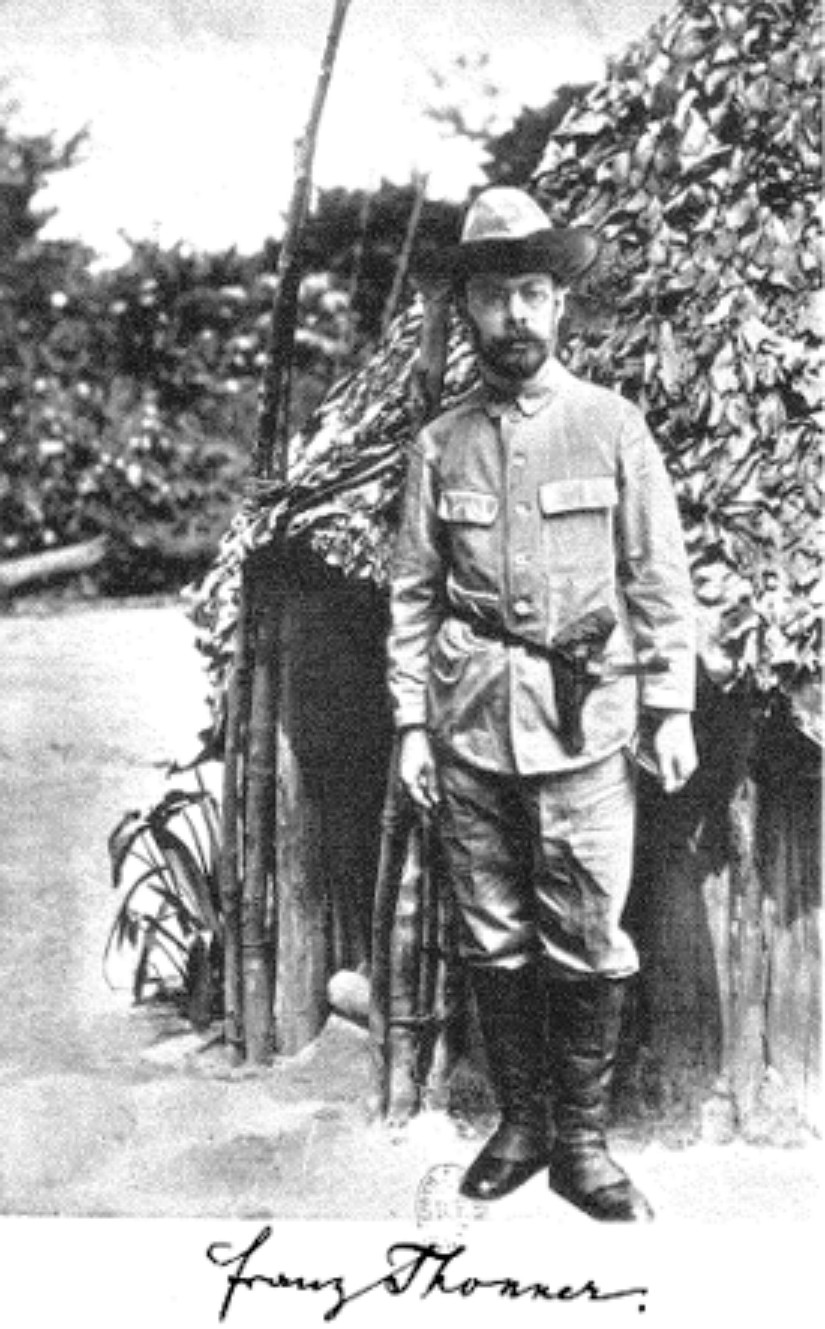

Franz Thonner (11 March 1863 – 21 April 1928) was an Austrian taxonomist and botanist from Vienna. In the spring of 1896, he made his first trip to the African interior to explore the botany and people in the northern part of the Congo Basin. Besides his comprehensive collection of plants, he embarked on a thorough ethnographic study of the region.

He was a scientist of independent means who explored Europe and North Africa and in 1891, at age 28, privately published a key to the families of flowering plants of the world. Despite the work's having been translated into English in 1895, it was largely ignored in that country. A second edition of his key appeared in 1917 and was based on Engler & Prantl's Die Natürlichen Pflanzenfamilien and Das Pflanzenreich.

Thonner's German plant key of 1891 was translated into English for the second time in 1981, and became more accessible to English-speaking botanists, rivalling that of John Hutchinson and Families of Angiosperms by Bertel Hansen & Knud Rahn (1969). The key covers gymnosperms and angiosperms and was designed for field use. Thonner also used back-up features ensuring correct choice of the family even when there is uncertainty about classifying botanical structures. Geographical distribution is used to assist in identification.

== Books ==
- Im afrikanischen Urwald. Meine Reise nach dem Kongo und der Mongalla im Jahre 1896 (Berlin, D. Reimer 1898) mit 20 Textabb., 87 Lichtdruck-Tafeln, Karten, illustr. Olwd.
- Exkursionsflora von Europa. Anleitung zum Bestimmen der Gattungen der europäischen Blütenpflanzen (Berlin, 1901)
- Die Blütenpflanzen Afrikas - Eine Anleitung zum Bestimmen der Gattungen der afrikanischen Siphonogamen (Berlin, R. Friedländer) 1908
- Vom Kongo zum Ubangi. Meine zweite Reise in Mittelafrika (Berlin, D. Reimer 1910)
- The flowering plants of Africa; an analytical key to the genera of African phanerogams, London, Dulau & Co., Ltd.,1915
- Anleitung zum Bestimmen der Familien der Blütenpflanzen (Phanerogamen) (1917, Second edition)
- Thonner's analytical key to the families of flowering plants edited by R. Geesink, A. J. M. Leeuwenberg, C. E. Ridsdale, J . F. Veldkamp (Leiden Botanical Series, Volume 5, The Netherlands and Leiden University Press 1981) ISBN 90-6021-462-5 [Translated into English and revised from Anleitung (1917)]
