= Lulanguru =

- Municipality
- Location in Tanzania
- Coordinates: 5°6′S 32°38′E
- Country: Tanzania
- Region: Tabora Region
- Time zone: UTC+3 (EAT)
- Climate: Aw

Lulanguru is a village in Tanzania's Tabora Region.

== See also ==
- Transport in Tanzania
