= Itaga (Tanzania) =

- Location within Tanzania

Highest point
- Coordinates: 4°55′S 32°44′E

Geography
- Location: Tabora Region
- OS grid: TQ 179 511
- Topo map: OS Landranger 187

Itaga is a hill in Tanzania's Tabora Region, located north of the city of Tabora. The Igombe dam is located near Itaga.
