= Usoke =

- Municipality
- Location in Tanzania
- Coordinates: 5°5′S 32°19′E
- Country: Tanzania
- Region: Tabora Region
- District: Urambo District

Population
  - Total: 6,704
- Time zone: UTC+3 (EAT)
- Climate: Aw

Usoke is a village in the Urambo District, of Tanzania's Tabora Region.

== See also ==
- Railway stations in Tanzania
- Transport in Tanzania
