= Compagnie du chemin de fer du Congo =

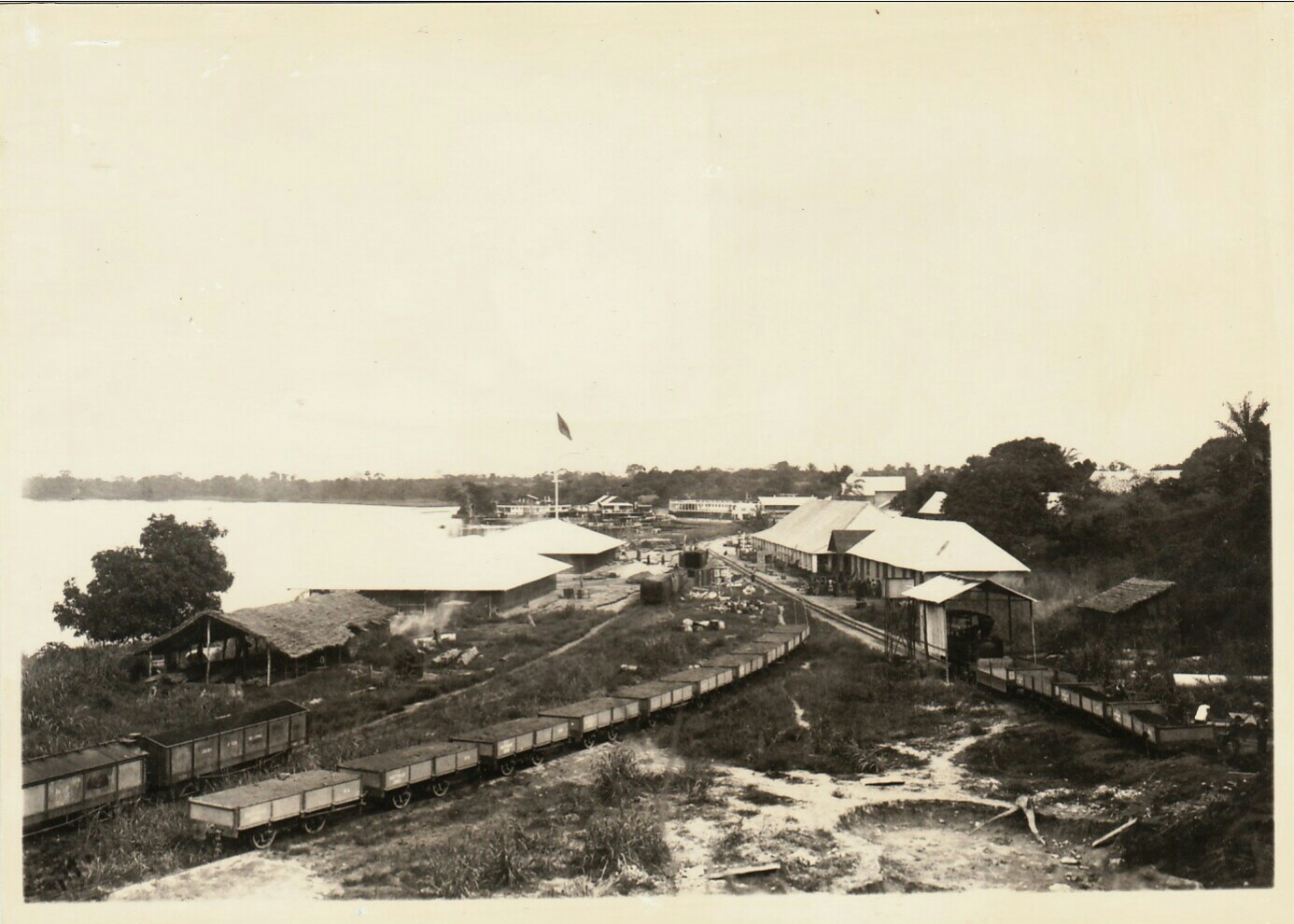
- Congo Railways at Leopoldville, a view of the port and the train station

Technical
- Track gauge: 750 mm (2 ft 5 1/2 in); 765 mm (2 ft 6 1/8 in); 1,067 mm (3 ft 6 in)

The Railway Company of the Congo (French: Compagnie du chemin de fer du Congo, or CCFC) was a narrow gauge railway company in the Congo, which built and operated the Matadi–Kinshasa Railway initially with a gauge of 750 mm (2 ft 5 1/2 in).

== History ==
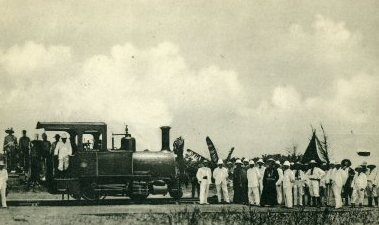
The first locomotive arriving at Léopoldville in 1898

The Compagnie du Chemin de Fer du Congo (CCFC) was founded on 31 July 1889. The construction of the railway was directed by Albert Thys, whose name was given to one of the railway stations, Thysville (now Mbanza-Ngungu).

The completion of the Matadi–Kinshasa railway, in 1898, provided an alternative route around the rapids and sparked the rapid development of Léopoldville. Its construction cost the lives of 1,932 people (1,800 locals and 132 immigrants). The living conditions in the construction of this railway were miserable. The sanitary and medical facilities were insufficient. In 1892, about two thousand people worked on the railroad, of which an average of one hundred and fifty workers per month lost their lives due to smallpox, dysentery, beriberi and exhaustion. By the end of 1892, 7,000 workers had already been recruited, 3,500 of whom had died or fled (for example, to neighboring forests). These conditions made it more difficult to recruit workers. Thys therefore attracted people from Barbados and China in September and November 1892 respectively. The Barbadians refused to leave the boats in the port of Matadi until they were forced by firearms. Seven people lost their lives in this action.

The main challenge was to build the railway track through the gorges of the Congo River, onwards through the M'pozo River, and a difficult passage along the Monts de Cristal.

== Gauges ==
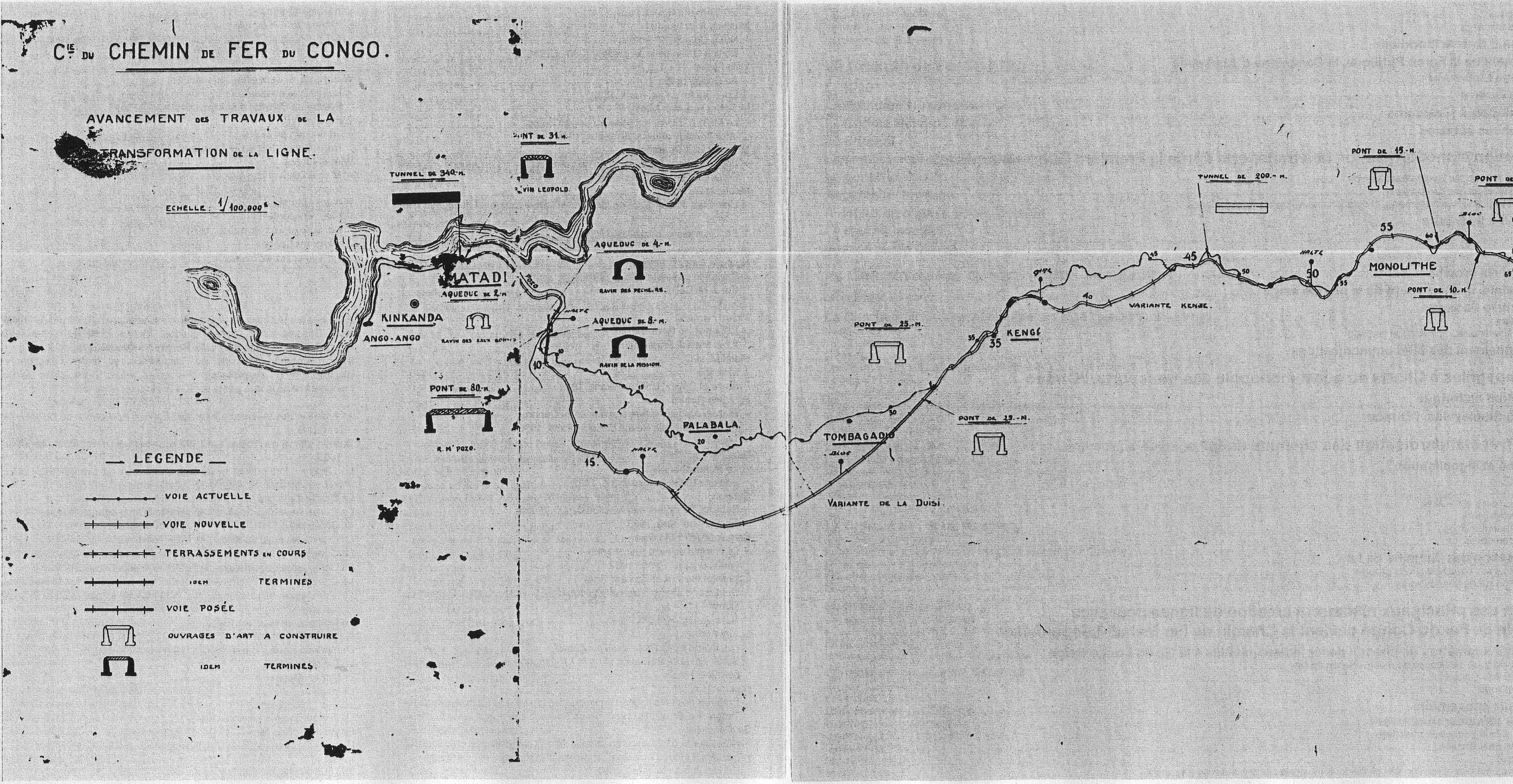
Comparisonof the old and new alignment

Starting in 1890, the railway line was initially built to a nominal gauge of 750 mm (2 ft 5 1/2 in), and all rolling stock was constructed to this gauge. However, as local labour had difficulty understanding the concept of gauge widening on curves, the entire line was rebuilt to a gauge of 765 mm (2 ft 6 1/8 in). Modifications were made from 1923 to 1931, when it was converted to 1,067 mm (3 ft 6 in) gauge on a new alignment.

Since the local government considered this massive renovation project of ‘national importance’ it requested that a national labor force would be organized to conduct the work. As a result the colonial government in Léopoldville devised a complex plan to recruit indigenous labor in other parts of the Congo through a system of monetary incentives. Over a period of nine years thousands of laborers were thus press-ganged in far-flung regions of the Congo. They were to make days-long marches through the forest or savannah, often accompanied by their wives and children, to an inland port where they were loaded into sternwheelers for a week or longer journey to Léopoldville. The government promised to provide adequate food, lodgings, pay and a free return trip after their contact expired.

From the start the system was abused at all levels, among them: to reach their quotas the local colonial agent would often bribe local chiefs, medical personnel were forced to approve individuals that would not be apt for the job, food & lodgings were always below officially approved standards, pay was low and often arrived late, laborers would barter their food with locals, etc. Regularly justice officials would complain about the abuse, but most of the excesses were cleverly covered-up. Statistics still exist, but most figures are assumed under reported.

In spite of the technical and financial difficulties related to the construction of the railway line, it quickly proved to be profitable, mainly thanks to the transportation of ivory and rubber. As a 750 mm (2 ft 5 1/2 in) gauge railway it operated a large fleet of 0-6-0T, 0-6-2T, 2-6-2T steam locomotives before turning to 32 0-6-0+0-6-0 Garratts, and finally 5 outside-framed 2-8-2 locomotives.

== Rolling stock ==
- Locomotives (765mm gauge)

N°111, Garratt 0-6-0+0-6-0, livery of the Société de Saint-Léonard in Liège, 1913 (N°1744/1913)
N°112-123, Garratt 0-6-0+0-6-0, livery of the Saint-Léonard à Liège, 1920-21 (N°1901-1902/1920)
N°125-132, Garratt 0-6-0+0-6-0, livery of the Saint-Léonard à Liège, 1924 (N°2001-2009/1924)
N°132-142, Garratt 0-6-0+0-6-0, livery of the Saint-Léonard à Liège, 1925 (N°2040-49/1925)

== The railway in literature ==
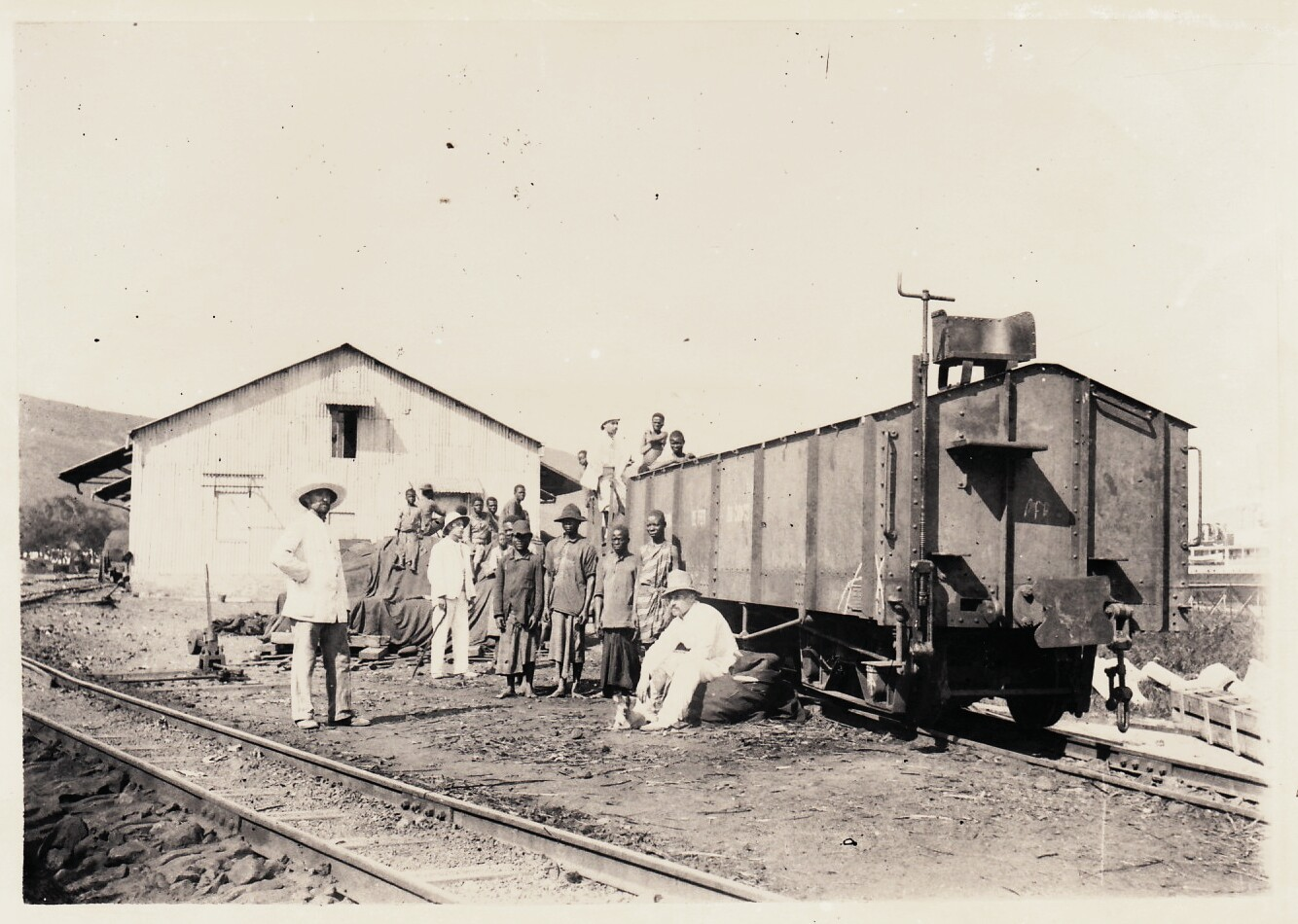
Staff of Matadi Railway Station with native workers

Joseph Conrad witnessed the hard labour on the railway line, when he worked in the Congo Free State, and subsequently mentioned this in his well-known novel Heart of Darkness.
