= Tabora offensive =

Military offensive in Africa during World War I

- Part of the East African campaign of World War I
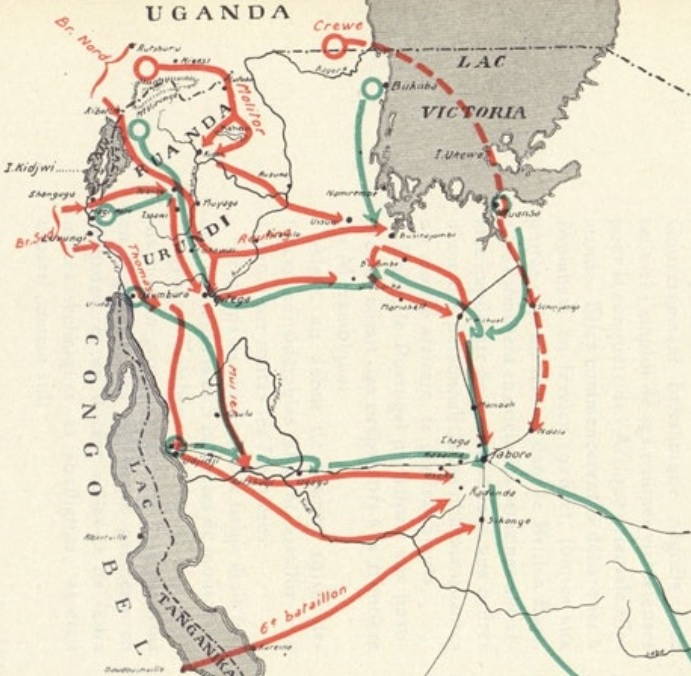
- Map of the Tabora offensive
Date	April–September 1916
Location	Tabora, German East Africa (modern-day Tanzania) 5.0167°S 32.8000°E
Result	Allied victory

Belligerents
Belgium: Belgian Congo; British Empire: South Africa	German Empire: German East Africa

Commanders and leaders
(Belgian Congo) Charles Tombeur (Belgian Congo) Frederik-Valdemar Olsen (Belgian Congo) Philippe Molitor (South Africa) Charles Crewe	Kurt Wahle; Max Wintgens (Note: Wintgens was a German captain under major general Wahle.); Erich von Langenn-Steinkeller

Strength
(Belgian Congo) Force Publique: 12,000 soldiers (Note: The Force Publique under Tombeur had deployed 719 European and 11,698 African soldiers for the offensive by May 1916.); (South Africa) Lakeforce: 2,800 soldiers; 10,000 porters (Note: In May 1916, Lake Force sent 5,000 porters to serve with Brigade Nord of the Force Publique.)	Schutztruppe: c. 8,000 soldiers (Note: The British estimated in April 1916 that about 373 European and 7,650 African Schutztruppe soldiers operated in the area between Tabora, Mwanza, Kivu, and Ujiji.); c. 1,000 Indugaruga; Unknown number of other Ruga-Ruga and porters
- Location within Tanzania Tabora offensive (Africa)

The Tabora offensive (April–September 1916) was an Anglo-Belgian offensive into German East Africa, which ended with the Battle of Tabora in the north-west of German East Africa (modern-day Tanzania), it was part of the East African campaign of World War I. The forces of the Belgian Congo crossed the border with German East Africa and captured the port city of Kigoma and the city of Tabora (the largest town in the interior of the German colony). In August a smaller Lake Force under the command of the South African brigadier general Crewe, launched a parallel attack from Uganda, also aimed at taking Tabora. (Note: Tombeur's plan of a year previously, that of a number of converging thrusts, thus eventually found practical application.) The completion of the offensive not only left much of the Ruanda-Urundi territory under Belgian military occupation but gave the Allies control of the important Tanganjikabahn railway.

== Prelude ==
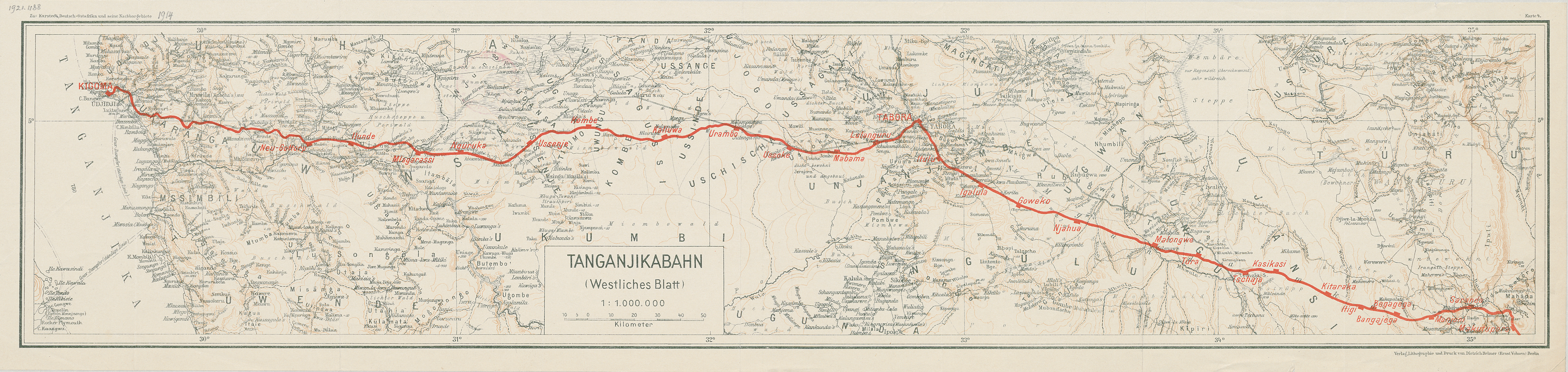
Tanganyika Railway (1914)

The German colony in East Africa was a threat to the neutral Belgian Congo, but the Belgian government hoped to continue its neutrality in Africa. The Force Publique was constrained to adopt a defensive strategy until 15 August 1914, when German ships on Lake Tanganyika bombarded the port of Mokolobu and then the Lukuga post (soon to be known as Albertville) a week later. On 24 September 1914 the Germans occupied Kwijwi Island, in this way taking control of Lake Kivu. On 23 October 1914, the ship Hedwig von Wissmann (Note: The crew and armament of Hedwig von Wissman came from the auxiliary cruiser SMS Möwe.) sank the Belgian Alexandre Delcommune on Lake Tanganyika, near Mtoa. In November of that same year, two German ships boarded and sank the Tanganjika lake steamer Cecil Rhodes.

After the British offensive in the north-eastern region of German East Africa and the landing at Tanga in 1914, the west of the colony was deemed more urgent as a theatre of operations in 1915 by the German command. General Lettow-Vorbeck had three vital strategic interests vested in controlling the west; the navigation of Lake Tanganyika, the head of the central railway at Kigoma and the security of the army's main food supplies in the Neu Langenburg area. However, only a small number of Schutztruppe troops was available to defend the west. Thus, the local regular troops were reinforced by Ruga-Ruga militias of varying reliability. For instance, the Kingdom of Rwanda –subject of German East Africa– deployed 1,000 warriors, dubbed Indugaruga, to fight alongside the Schutztruppe, commanded by Chiefs Rwidegembya and Rwakadigi. These were reportedly quite effective and loyal.

=== Regaining control over Lake Tanganyika ===
As early as March 1915, General Charles Tombeur asked the Belgian government for a small fleet, a submarine and seaplanes, initially Belgian minister Jules Renkin denied this request, but in June the British committed to supporting the Belgians in regaining control of the lake. HMS Mimi and Toutou —two British motorboats, which were transported to South Africa and from there by railway, by river, and by being dragged through the African jungle, to Lake Tanganyika— were launched onto the lake in late December 1915. Two naval engagements took place between elements of the Royal Navy, Force Publique and the Kaiserliche Marine. In the first action, on 26 December 1915 Kingani was damaged and captured, becoming HMS Fifi. In the second action, early February 1916, the small flotilla (Note: Mimi, Fifi, Dix-Tonne, a petrol-driven barge armed with two cannons, and the gunboat Netta) overwhelmed and sank Hedwig von Wissmann. The German Empire maintained a third large and heavily armed craft on the lake, Graf von Goetzen. (Note: Most of Graf von Goetzen's naval personnel and armament came from the light cruiser SMS Königsberg.)

From the Belgian airbase on the western shore near Albertville, on 10 June 1916, the Force Publique sent amphibious aircraft —Short Admiralty Type 827 planes — for a bombing raid on Graf von Goetzen as she sat in the harbour of Kigoma. (Note: Early January 1916 the Anversville departed from Falmouth on its expedition to the Belgian Congo, with four unarmed and disassembled seaplanes and four airmen on board) Graf von Goetzen was attacked by one of the Belgian floatplanes, but didn't suffer severe damage. The war on the lake had reached a stalemate by this stage. However, the war on land was progressing, largely to the advantage of the Allies, who cut off the railway link in July 1916 and threatened to isolate Kigoma completely.

== Capture of Rwanda, Burundi and Kigoma ==
In April 1916 two columns of the Force Publique advanced on Tabora. The first column (Brigade Nord), under the command of Colonel Molitor, crossed the German East African border north of Lake Kivu. The German defenders in the area, led by Max Wintgens, offered some resistance but retreated due to being heavily outnumbered; several Indugaruga troops accompanied the withdrawing Germans. Most Indugaruga instead intended to defend the Rwandan capital Kigali, even though Wintgens and Rwandan King Yuhi V Musinga had agreed to peacefully surrender it to the Belgians. After the monarch refused any further resistance, the remaining Indugaruga dispersed, while Molitor's troops occupied Kigali on 6 May 1916. After the conquest of Rwanda in May 1916 by the Belgo-Congolese forces, the brigade advanced to Biharamulo on 24 June. It reached Lake Victoria near Mwanza on 30 July 1916, after heavy fighting in the Ussuwi region, including a bloody skirmish in Kato on 2 July. St. Michaël fell on 21 August 1916.

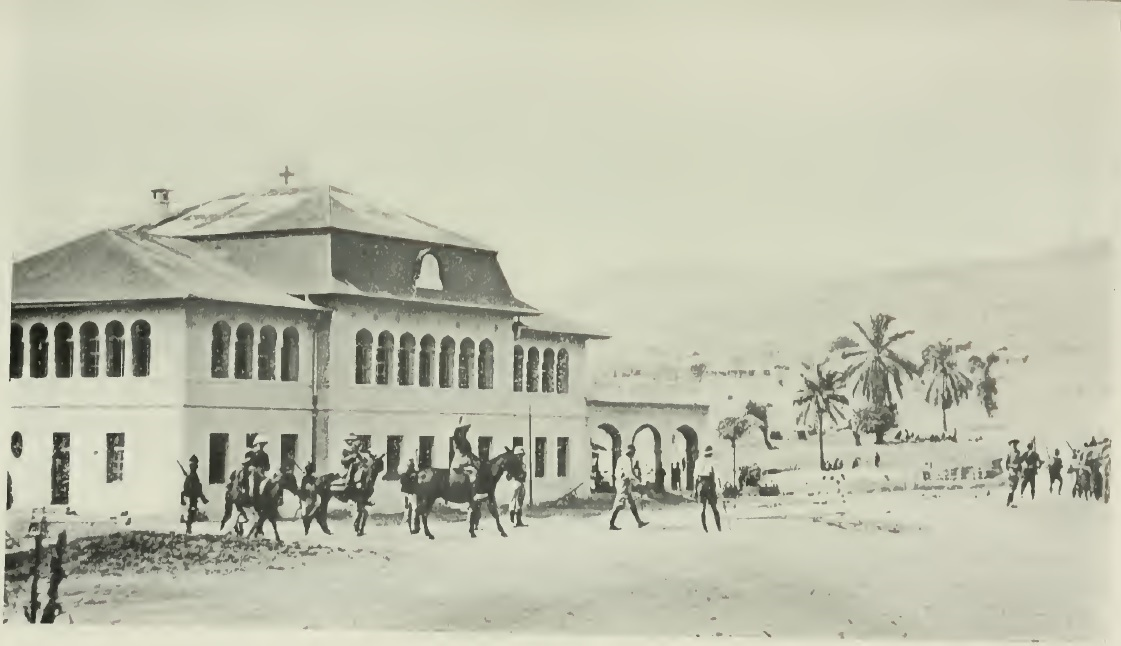
Brigade Sud at the railway station of Kigoma, August 1916.

The second column (Brigade Sud) occupied Usumbura on 6 June and Kitega on 16 June. In early July they advanced southwards from Usumbura along the eastern shore of Lake Tanganyika. The Belgian ship Netta sailed along the northeast coast in support of the land offensive, this naval presence led to the coastal towns of Rumonge and Nyanza being abandoned by the Schutztruppe. On 18 July the fortifications at Kigoma were bombed by two of the Belgian floatplanes and a petrol depot was set alight. On 19 July aerial photographs were taken and airborne leaflet propaganda was dropped over the old town of Ujiji, printed in Swahili, to prepare the local population for the arrival of the Allied troops. Brigade Sud took the fort at Kasulu on 24 July. In order to avoid Graf von Goetzen falling into Allied hands, General Lettow-Vorbeck ordered that the ship be scuttled. (Note: The German engineers decided that they would try to facilitate a later salvage, they loaded the ship with sand and covered all engines with a thick layer of grease before sinking her carefully on 26 July. The Belgians partly raised Graf von Goetzen in 1918, but ended their undertaking when Kigoma was ceded to the British. The latter salvaged the ship in 1926 and used her as a passenger and cargo ferry on Lake Tanganyika.)

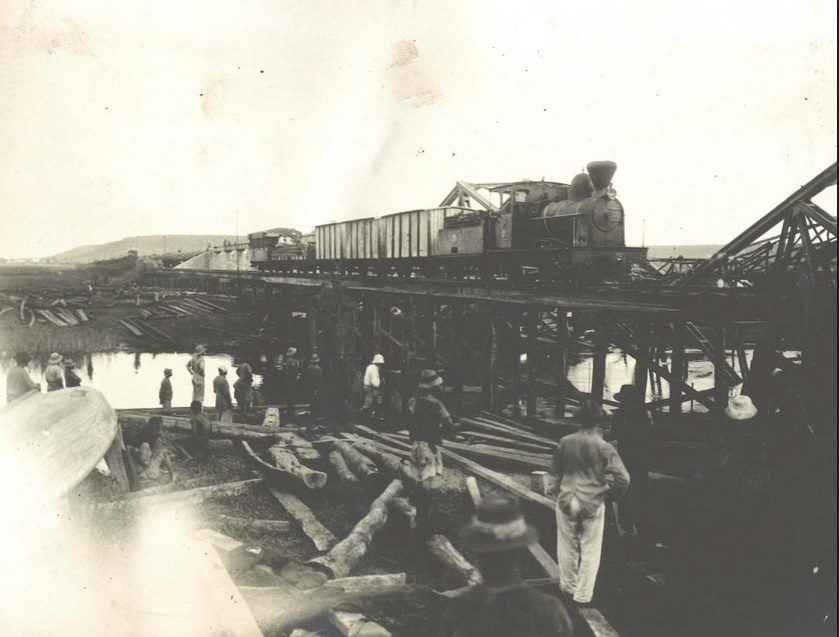
Repaired bridge over the Malagarasi River, September 1916.

On 27 July Netta shelled targets south of Kigoma. Later that same day, the Allies had captured a railway bridge near the port, advancing from the north and the east, which threatened to isolate Kigoma completely. This led the German naval commander on the lake, Gustav Zimmer, to retreat from the town and head south via railway and using Mwami, a steamer sent from Dar-es-Salam by rail. On 28 July Netta surprised the German boat Wami, while she was unloading troops and supplies, she was scuttled by her crew after being locked in. On 29 July Brigade Sud captured the port of Kigoma, terminus of the strategic railway line from Dar Es Salaam passing through Tabora to Kigoma and on 2 August Ujiji was under Allied control. After the German withdrawal from the lake, control of the surface of Lake Tanganyika passed to the British and Belgians.

In early August 1916 both columns started their converging marches to Tabora. The smaller British force, commanded by the South-African Brigadier General Charles Crewe, took Mwanza on 14 July 1916 and Shinyanga on 28 August. Crewe was in a race with the Belgian forces to reach Tabora but the British Lake Force was slowed down because of severe supply problems. (Note: There was heavy rainfall (rainy season) in September and October.) (Note: East Africa was not appropriate for mounted troops, eventually most equines would succumb to the tsetse fly.)

== Battle of Tabora ==
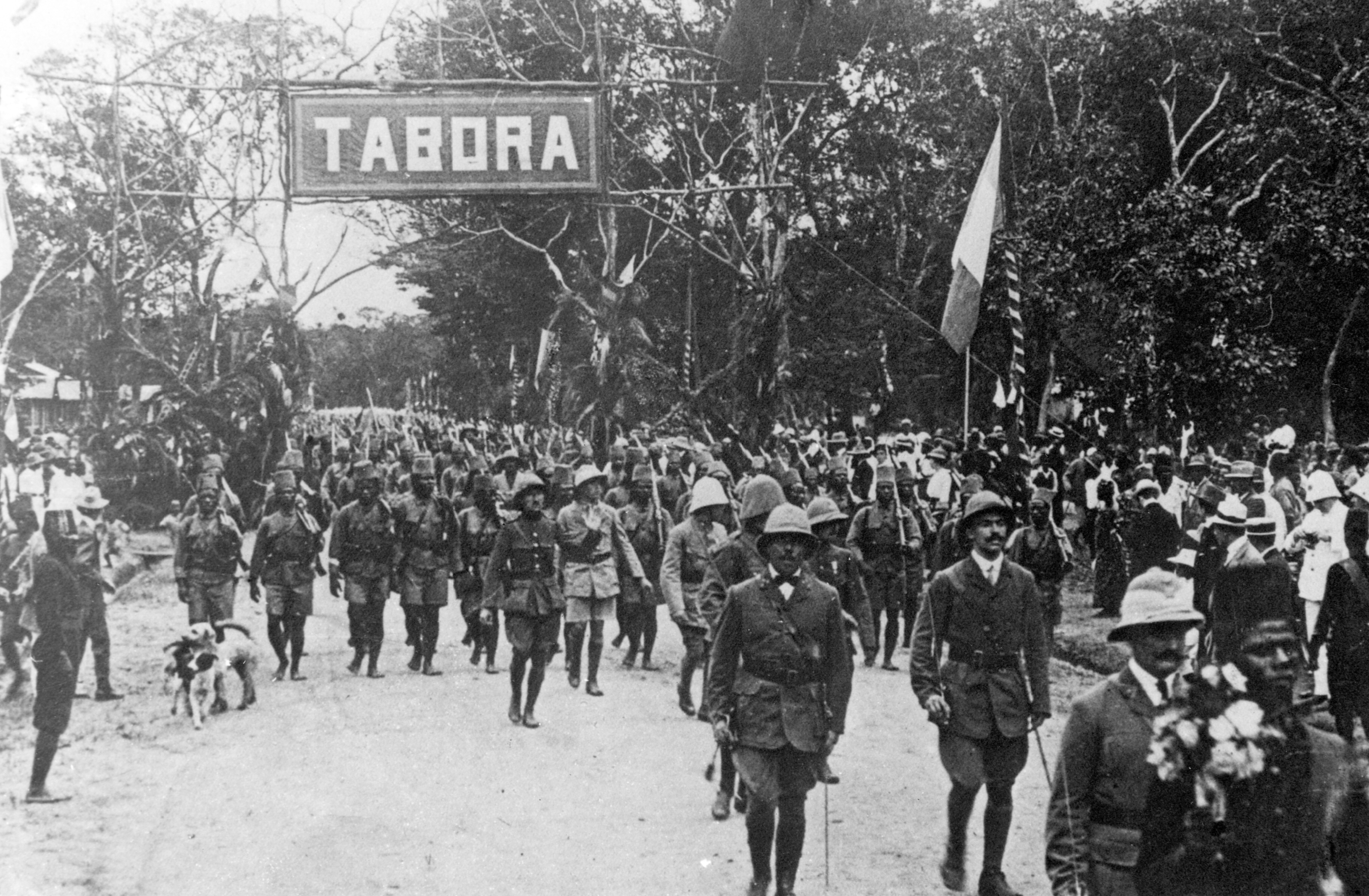
Belgo-Congolese troops of the Force Publique after the Battle of Tabora, 19 September 1916.

The southern brigade commanded by Colonel Frederik Valdemar Olsen advanced to Tabora following the Tanganyika Railway (Tanganjikabahn), which the Germans destroyed as they withdrew to the east. (Note: The Germans also made sure no trains and other equipment were left behind in the stations that were taken.) Tabora was an open plain surrounded by hills, which German Major General Wahle had used to build his defences. The southern brigade took control of the German railway station at Usoke on 30 August 1916, in response Wahle sent reinforcements from Tabora to Usoke by train.

The German Schutztruppen launched the counterattack on Usoke 2–3 September, which was repelled by the Force Publique. On 7 September, General Wahle launched another counterattack on the train station of Usoke, this time a naval gun was mounted on one of the railway wagons. Both sides suffered heavy losses, the train station was bombarded, the Force Publique launched an attack, and the Germans were pushed back.

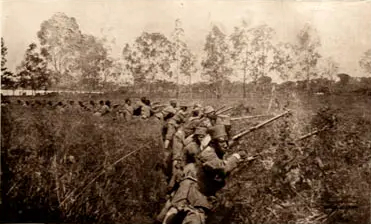
Belgian troops at Lulanguru

When the last resistance in Usoke (west of Tabora) was broken, the Belgians advanced to reach the German defences of Tabora at Lulanguru on 8 September. The southern brigade led the offensive actions for the next four days, closing in on Tabora from the west. Wahle established his main positions at Itaga, north of Tabora. From 10–12 September the northern brigade encountered heavy German resistance in the hills of Itaga, where they suffered considerable casualties. (Note: Brigade Nord, under lt. col. Armand Huyghé, took the hills, but Wahle sent reinforcements by rail pushing the Force Publique back the next day.) By this time Wahle's forces were reduced to 1.100 rifles and the desertion of his askari soldiers multiplied. He disbanded the naval unit under his command and redistributed these soldiers among the field companies.

On 16 September the Germans intercepted a letter from Crewe for Colonel Molitor (Brigade Nord), which stated that the main offensive from the north was planned for 19 September. After heavy fighting, the German army retreated in three columns to the southeast, two initially following the railway and one to go due south from Tabora to Sikonge.

The civilian authorities of Tabora surrendered to the troops of the Force Publique on 19 September 1916. The Belgians liberated around 200 Allied prisoners of war (mainly Belgians and British) and 228 German soldiers were captured. The Force Publique lost 1,300 soldiers. On 3 October, after the Allies had established control of the African Great Lakes region, Lake Force was disbanded. Wahle's three columns, in anticipation of an Allied pursuit, were retreating at a rapid pace to Iringa and Mahenge, in a bid to reunite with Lettow. General Wahle found himself in unexplored and uninhabited terrain, with no water and food at his disposal. (Note: Wahle had prepared a supply dump on the central railway near Malongwe, but had to leave most of the food because of a lack of porters, 600 Indian prisoners of war were used to carry munitions and medical supplies.) (Note: German East Africa's economy was largely self-sufficient until late 1916, when General Wahle lost access to the main food-producing areas around Neu Langenburg.)

== Aftermath ==
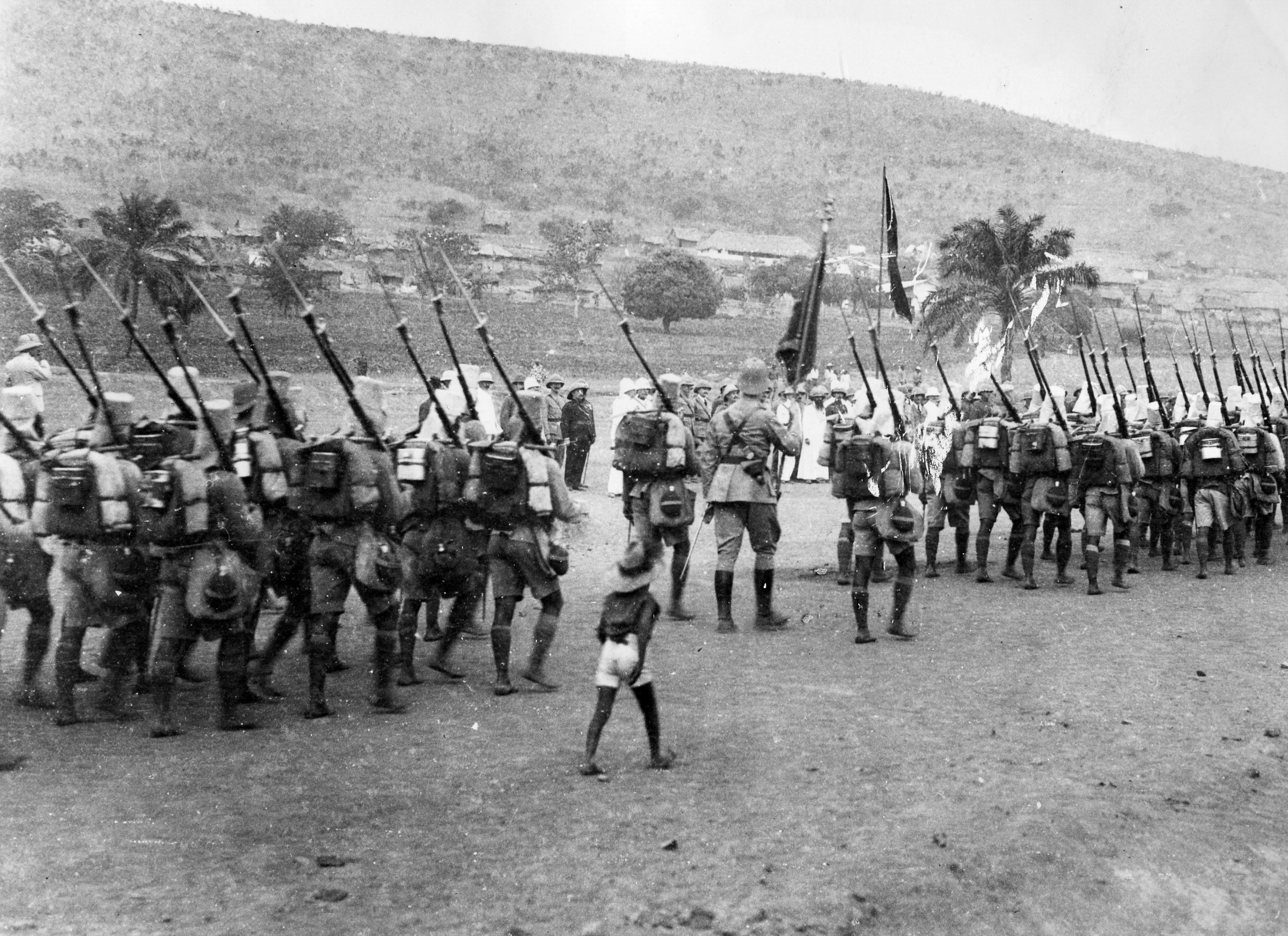
Belgo-Congolese troops marching through Kilosa in preparation of the Mahenge Offensive, July 1917.

Following the Tabora Offensive, the British and Belgian governments agreed on 19 January 1917 that the latter would retreat the majority of its forces to Rwanda and Urundi—2,000 soldiers remained to secure the occupied territories, as proposed by General Smuts—and to bring its military campaign in German East Africa to a conclusion. On 25 February 1917 the British were granted control over Tabora.

Because of the continued German resistance (Note: Including a raid, aimed at Tabora, under the command of Captain Wintgens and Lieutenant Naumann in May 1917. Captain Wintgens was captured south of Tabora by the Force Publique (Brigade Nord) on 24 May. Lieutenant Naumann and his remaining 600 men marched north-northeast to the Usambara Railway, where they held up a train near Kahe in September 1917.) and their growing experience in guerrilla warfare tactics, the troops of the Force Publique were moved to the Dodoma-Kilosa region in July 1917, at the request of the British government and marched on Mahenge in September 1917. (Note: General Jacob van Deventer devised the plan for the Belgians to advance on Mahenge from Kilosa and was in command of this joint Allied offensive.) After the Mahenge Offensive and the capture of Mahenge in October 1917, the Belgian Congolese army controlled roughly one-third of German East Africa. At the end of 1917, part of the units that took Mahenge were sent to the central railway for redeployment to Kilwa and Lindi.

=== Military analysis ===
The strategy of the German forces, led by Generalmajor Paul von Lettow-Vorbeck, was to divert Allied resources from the Western Front to Africa. His strategy achieved only mixed results after 1916, when the Allied forces were reinforced by the South Africans, the Belgo-Congolese Force Publique and Portuguese colonial troops. (Note: In March 1916 Portugal officially entered the war. Portugal sent its second expeditionary force to East Africa under Major José Luís de Moura Mendes, and on 10 April 1916 managed to occupy the Kionga Triangle —which they believed the Germans had taken from them in 1885—, within the year von Lettow-Vorbeck had retaken it.) The campaign in Africa consumed considerable amounts of money and war material that could have gone to other fronts. (Note: On the German side, Lettow-Vorbeck was resupplied from the homeland in 1915 by the merchantship Rubens and in 1916 by Marie. A final attempt to resupply the Schutztruppe was made on 21 November 1917 by an airship from Jamboli in Bulgaria.) Lettow-Vorbeck returned to Germany in early March 1919 to a hero's welcome, he led 120 officers of the Schutztruppe on a victory parade through the Brandenburg Gate, which was decorated in their honour. The Belgian government's main aim was to defend the Belgian Congo and to take control of Lake Tanganyika, Charles Tombeur was awarded the title of baron for his service in World War I. Jan Smuts became Prime Minister of South Africa in 1919 and South Africa was given a Class C mandate over German South-West Africa (later Namibia).

=== International politics ===
The Tabora offensive increased the bargaining power of the Belgian government in exile and was to ensure the restoration of Belgium after the war. During the post-war negotiations of the Paris Peace Conference, the Belgian Colonial Minister, Jules Renkin, sought to trade territorial gains in German East Africa for the Portuguese allocation in northern Angola, to gain Belgian Congo a longer coastline.

After the war, as outlined in the Treaty of Versailles, Germany was eventually forced to cede "control" of German East Africa to the Allied Powers. Apart from Ruanda-Urundi (assigned to Belgium) (Note: On 20 October 1924, Ruanda-Urundi (1924–1945), which consisted of modern-day Rwanda and Burundi, became a Belgian League of Nations mandate territory, with Usumbura as its capital.) and the small Kionga Triangle (assigned to Portuguese Mozambique), the territory was transferred to British control. Tanganyika was adopted by the British as the name for its part of the former German colony in East Africa.
