= Lake Force =

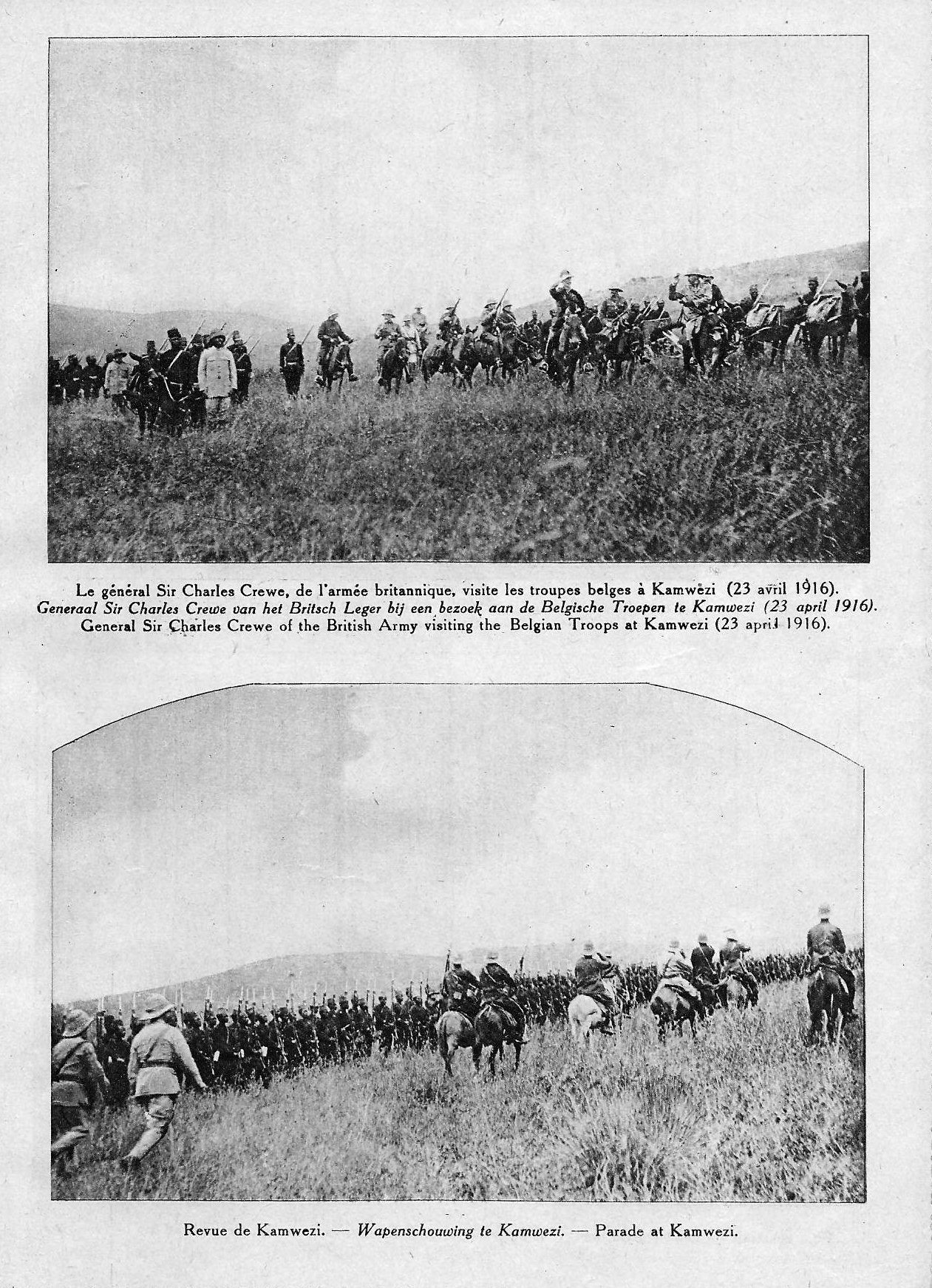
Charles Crewe meets with Brigade Nord, 23 April 1916.

Lake Force (or Lakeforce) was a British field force stationed in the Uganda Protectorate on the west coast of Lake Victoria under the command of Brigadier-General Sir Charles Crewe in 1916, during the East African campaign of the World War I. It consisted of 2,800 soldiers and 10,000 porters. In May 1916, Lake Force sent 5,000 porters and 100 oxwagons to serve with their allies, the Force publique of the Belgian Congo under Charles Tombeur. The Uganda Native Medical Corps (UNMC) served with both units.

Lake Force cooperated with the Belgians during the Tabora Offensive in German East Africa, usually subordinating their own desires to Belgian. (Note: Several underlying factors played a role in the allied cooperation in this campaign. The South Africans and the British had only a decade before ended the Second Boer War and more recently the Maritz rebellion. The allies never lost sight of their interests with regard to the post-war settlement and the redistribution of occupied territories. Lewis Harcourt, the colonial secretary in London had been unenthusiastic about Belgian cooperation in 1915, because he feared Belgian claims, and British control of German East Africa would open the link from the Cape to Cairo. The Belgian Congo had a majority of African soldiers in the Force Publique, while the Lake Force were mainly South African Boers.) (Note: In August 1914 the French foreign minister, Gaston Doumergue, had suggested a joint operation in East Africa, but the Colonial office had no wish to excite French ambition in East Africa, the French troops in Madagascar were not called on.) The initial British objective was Mwanza, which fell on 14 July 1916. Over 40,000 loads were stockpiled there by 19 September, but Mwanza's value as a base was minimized by lack of porters to carry them southwards. Lake Force's logistics problems were severe. The area south of Mwanza was waterless and completely stripped of resources by the Germans. On 28 August, Lake Force captured Shinyanga without fighting. A letter by Crewe intended for Lieutenant-Colonel Philippe François Joseph Molitor, commander of the Northern Brigade, and stating that the British assault on Tabora would begin on 19 September was on the 16th intercepted by the Germans, who then abandoned the town on the night of 18–19 September. The Belgians occupied it the next day, and Lake Force camped outside it to the east. On 3 October, after the Allies had established control of the African Great Lakes region, Lake Force was disbanded. Some of its Ugandan medics were sent to serve with the Uganda Field Ambulance in the 4th battalion of the King's African Rifles.
