= East African campaign =

East African campaign may refer to:

- East African campaign (World War I)
- East African campaign (World War II)
