= Battle of Dodoma =

- Part of East African Campaign
Location	Dodoma, German East Africa

The Battle of Dodoma was fought during the East African Campaign of World War I.
