= Charles Tombeur =

Belgian Army general

Baron Charles Tombeur de Tabora
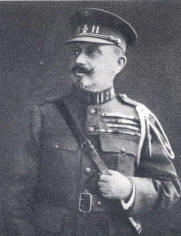
- Portrait photograph of Tombeur
- Born: 4 May 1867; Liège, Belgium
- Died: 2 December 1947 (aged 80); Brussels, Belgium
- Military career
- Allegiance: Belgium
- Service years: 1887–1920
- Rank: Lieutenant-general
- Commands: Force Publique
- Conflicts: World War I; East African campaign; Tabora Offensive; Battle of Tabora
- Awards: Baron (1926)

Lieutenant General Charles Tombeur, 1st Baron of Tabora (4 May 1867 – 2 December 1947) was a Belgian military officer and colonial civil servant. As well as holding several major administrative positions in the Belgian Congo, he is particularly known for his role as commander of the Belgian colonial military, the Force Publique, during the first years of World War I. His military career culminated in the capture of Tabora in German East Africa in September 1916.

== Biography ==
Tombeur was born in Liège, Belgium in 1867 and enlisted in the Belgian Army at the age of 16. He was later admitted to the Belgian Royal Military Academy in Brussels, graduating in 1898. In 1902, he enlisted for service in the Congo Free State, an independent state controlled by Belgium's monarch Leopold II, as a junior officer in the Force Publique. He remained in position through the Belgian annexation of the Free State as the Belgian Congo until 1909. Returning to Belgium, he served briefly as aide-de-camp to King Albert I from 1909 to 1912. In 1912, Tombeur returned to the Congo as an civilian inspector general (inspecteur d'état) where he became the senior administrator for Katanga Province and presided over the first years of the city of Élisabethville (modern-day Lubumbashi).

Following the outbreak of World War I and the German invasion of Belgium, Tombeur became the commander of the Belgian colonial forces on the border with German East Africa. He presided over the re-organisation of the Force Publique and, in April 1916, led a Belgian force into Rwanda as part of the British-led East African Campaign. By June 1916, the whole of Rwanda had fallen and Burundi was occupied soon afterwards. Tombeur was made military governor of the Belgian Occupied East African Territories consisting of the future Belgian mandate of Ruanda-Urundi. The expeditionary force soon headed for the German military stronghold at Tabora in modern-day Tanzania. After a lengthy battle, Tombeur entered the town on 20 September 1916. Tombeur was recalled to Europe in late 1916 and was replaced as commander in East Africa by Armand Huyghé. In early 1917, he was promoted to the rank of Vice-Governor-General, the second highest administrative position in the Congo. He served as governor of Katanga from 1918 to 1920.

Tombeur retired from the colonial service in July 1920 but remained active within colonial associations in Belgium. In 1926, Albert I awarded him the title Baron of Tabora. He died in 1947.
