= Force Publique =

1885–1960 Congolese colonial military

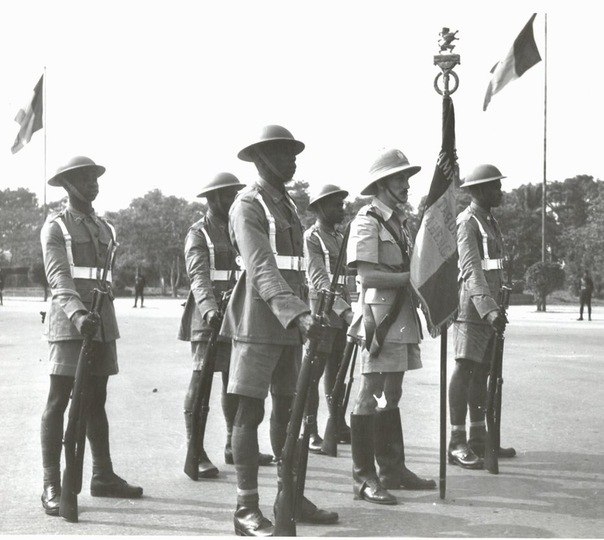
- Force Publique soldiers on parade with their Belgian officer in the late 1940s
- Active: 1885–1960
- Allegiance: Congo Free State (to 1908); Belgian Congo (1908–1960); Congo-Léopoldville (1960)
- Type: Colonial army
- Size: c. 17,000 (1914) c. 23,500 (1960)
- Nickname: FP
- Engagements: Congo Arab war World War I World War II

The Force Publique (French: [fɔʁs pyblik]; Dutch: Openbare Weermacht, lit. 'Public Force') was the colonial military of the Congo Free State and the Belgian Congo from 1885 to 1960. It was established after Belgian Army officers travelled to the Free State to found an armed force in the colony on Leopold II of Belgium's orders. The Force Publique was heavily involved in atrocities in the Congo Free State, and also saw action in the Congo Arab war, World War I and World War II. It was renamed to the Congolese National Army in July 1960 after Congo gained independence from Belgian colonial rule.

== Establishment ==
The Force Publique was initially conceived in 1885 when Leopold II of Belgium, who established the Congo Free State as his private colony, ordered the Belgian Secretary of the Interior to create a military for the Free State. Soon afterwards, in early 1886, Captain Léon Roget (of the Belgian Army's Regiment of Carabiniers) was sent to the Congo with orders to establish the force. A few months later, on 17 August, he was promoted to "Commandant of the Force Publique". A number of other Belgian officers and non-commissioned officers were also dispatched to the territory as the nucleus of the officer corps. The officers of the Force Publique were entirely European. They comprised a mixture of Belgian regular soldiers and mercenaries from other countries who were drawn by the prospect of wealth or simply attracted to the adventure of service in Africa.

== Under the Congo Free State ==
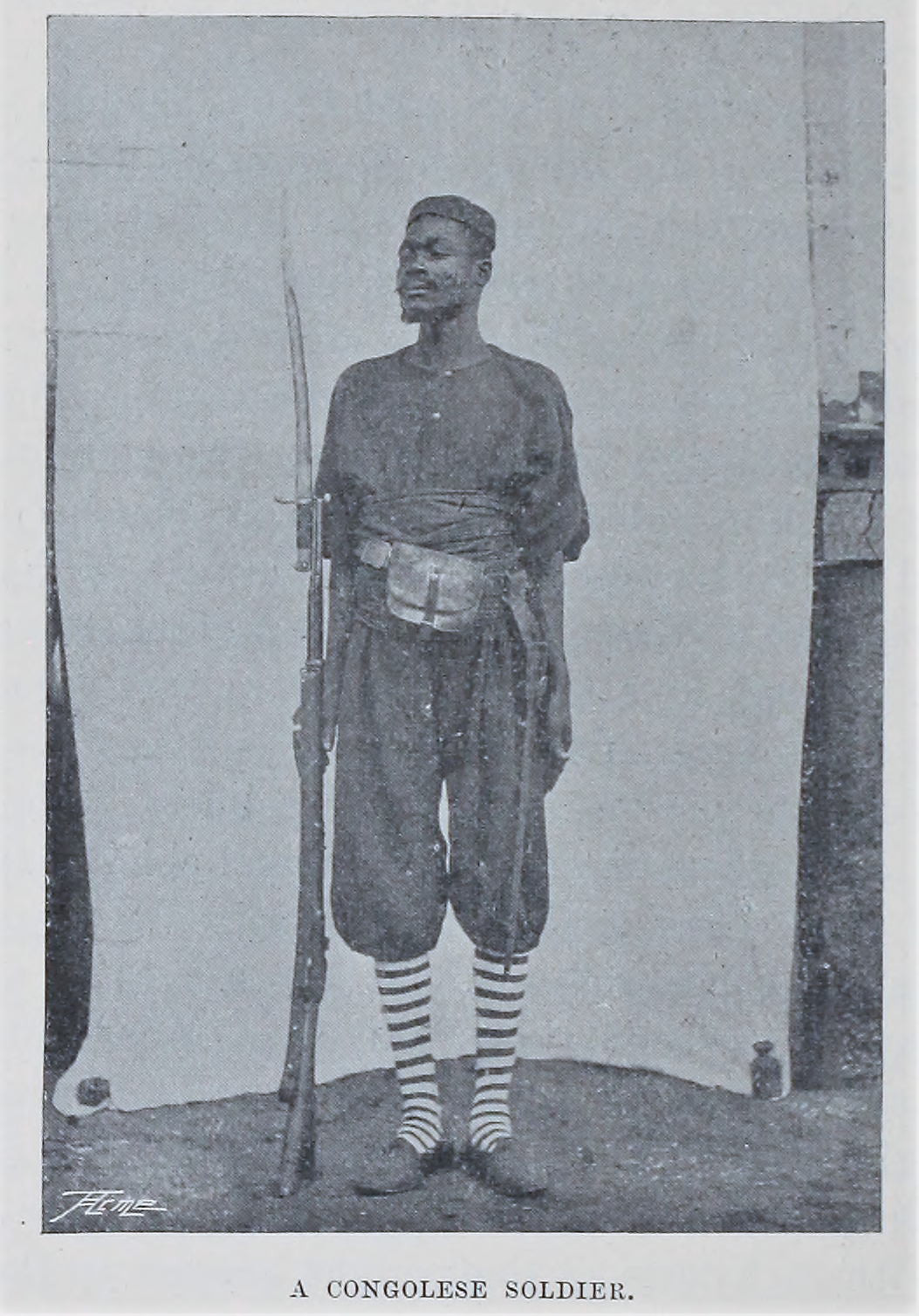
A Force Publique soldier in 1898

To command his Force Publique, Leopold II was able to rely on a mixture of volunteers (regular officers detached from the Belgian Army), mercenaries and former officers from the armies of other European nations, especially those of Scandinavia, Italy and Switzerland. To these men, service in the Congo Free State offered military experience, adventure and—as they saw it—an opportunity to participate in a humanitarian endeavour. From 1885 to 1908 the officer corps consisted of hundreds of Belgians and dozens of Scandinavians, with smaller numbers recruited from other nations.

Serving under these European officers was an ethnically mixed African soldiery, who eventually became comparable to the askaris fielded by other European colonial powers. Many were recruited or conscripted from “warrior tribes” in the Upper Congo, others were mercenaries drawn from Zanzibar and West Africa (Nigerian Hausas). The role required of the Force Publique was that of both defending Free State territory and of internal pacification. In the 1890s, the Force Publique defeated the African and Arab slavers in the course of the Congo Arab war (1892–1894), which resulted in tens of thousands of casualties. In 1896, an expedition of several hundred Force Publique soldiers entered the territory of the Kingdom of Rwanda in an attempt to claim the area for the Congo Free State, setting up a camp at Shangi. This operation culminated in the Battle of Shangi, with the Force Publique winning a major victory over the Rwandan royal army. Regardless, the Force Publique subsequently withdrew due to internal problems as well as diplomatic pressure by the German Empire.

As time went on, the Force Publique began to increasingly recruit and to rely on Belgian officers and native Congolese soldiers, so that the white and black foreign mercenaries had been mostly phased out by 1908.

=== Atrocities ===
Under Leopold II the Force Publique was described as an "exceptionally brutal army". One major purpose of the Force was to enforce the rubber quotas and other forms of forced labour. Armed with modern weapons and the chicote—a bull whip made of hippopotamus hide—soldiers of the FP often took and mistreated hostages. Reports from foreign missionaries and consular officials detail a number of instances where Congolese men and women were flogged or raped by soldiers of the Force Publique, unrestrained by their officers and NCOs. They burned villages they viewed as recalcitrant. There is evidence, including photographs, that FP soldiers cut off human hands, either as trophies, or to show that bullets had not been wasted, or (by cutting off the limbs of children) to punish parents viewed as not working hard enough in the rubber plantations.

During the Free State period, the Force Publique suffered from institutional problems. During the early years of the force, mutinies of black soldiers occurred several times. By the early 1890s, much of the eastern portion of the Free State was under the control of Arab ivory and slave traders (though the Government was able to re-establish control over the east by the mid-1890s). Organizational problems were also quite prevalent during the Free State era. With many Force Publique detachments being stationed in remote areas of the territory, some officers took to using soldiers under their control to further private economic agendas rather than focusing on military concerns. By the end of 1891, the force had 60 officers, 60 non-commissioned officers, and 3,500 black soldiers. Friendly tribes and militias were often used to help exert control over the outermost parts of the Free State. By 1900, the Force Publique numbered 19,000 men.

== Under the Belgian Congo ==
=== Organisation and role ===
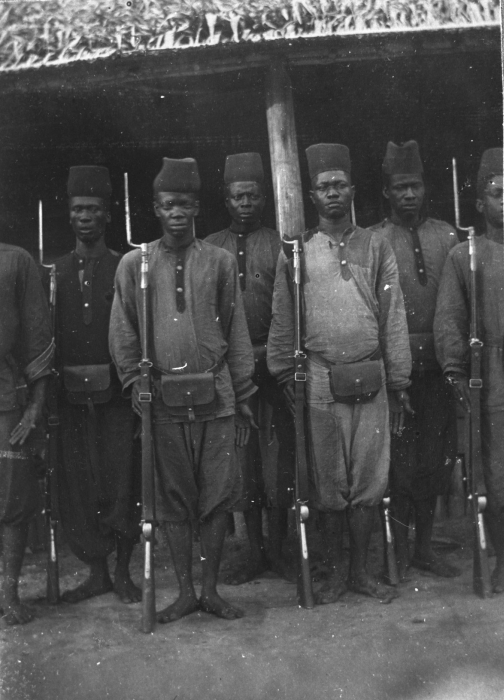
Force Publique soldiers some time after 1910

Following the takeover of the Free State by the Belgian government in 1908, the new authorities reorganised the Force Publique. This process was rather slow, however, and was only completed during the First World War. Though the new Belgian administration was "more enlightened" than its predecessor, it still tried to keep the cost of the colonial army low. As result, the proportion of commissioned Belgian officers to askaris (about one to a hundred) was very low by the standards of most colonial armies of this period. The weaponry of the Force Publique also remained mostly outdated due to the tight budgetary constraints on the colonial administration. Most askaris were armed with single shot 11 mm Albini-Braendlin rifles, though the white cadres and units in Katanga were given better Mauser Model 1889 rifles. Other weapons included Maxim machine guns, smaller numbers of Madsen machine guns, Nordenfelt 4.7 cm and Krupp 7.5 cm cannons.

The uniforms of the old Free State remained in use among the Force Publique until the First World War: Belgian officers wore white uniforms until late 1914, while the blue uniform (with red trim around the neck and down the front opening), red fez and sash of the askaris was phased out in a series of changes during 1915–1917. Thereafter, officers and askaris wore a variety of khaki uniforms.

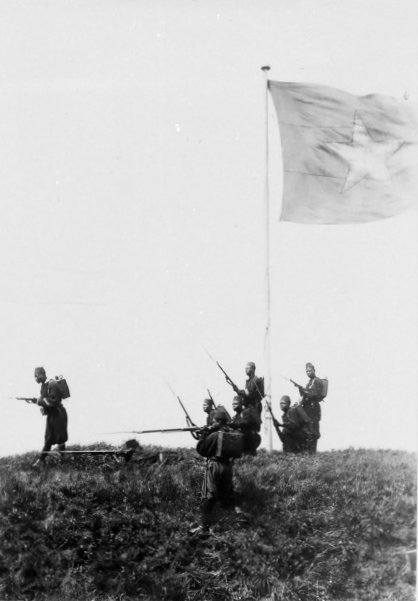
The Force Publique, 1928

In 1914 the Force Publique was organised into 21 separate companies (originally numbered but later known only by their names) each between 225 and 950 men strong, along with an artillery and an engineers unit. The entire force numbered over 12,100 men. The companies were as follows: Aruwimi, Bangala, Bas-Congo, Cateracts, Équateur, Ituri, Kasai, Kwango, Lac Léopold II, Lualaba, Lulongo, Makrakas, Makua-Bomokandi, Ponthiérville, Rubi, Ruzizi-Kivu, Stanley Falls, Stanley Pool, Ubangi, and Uele-Bili. There were also six recruit training camps containing an additional 2,400 men.

The separate companies comprising the Force Publique eventually grew to over 600 men each. Their constituent units, known as detachments, were so widely scattered that the force had no real military value. Rather the bulk of these sub-units consisted of small garrisons in fixed locations, with local policing functions. It was intended that each administrative company form a Compagnie Marche of 150 men. Each Marche or field company was intended to have four Belgian officers and NCOs plus between 100 and 150 askaris. In principle, companies comprised two or three 50-man platoons. There were supposed to be enough companies to form three Marche battalions. Eight Congolese soldiers were promoted to NCO.

The 2,875 men of the Troupes du Katanga constituted a semi-autonomous force of six companies: four de marche and two other infantry, plus a cyclist company and a battalion headquarters.

Lastly, there was the Compagnie d'Artillerie et de Génie (Artillery and Engineers Company) manning Fort de Shinkakasa at the mouth of the Congo River in Boma. The fort contained eight 160mm guns manned by 200 men, plus an equal-sized auxiliary force, which saw little or no service during the war.

=== World War I ===
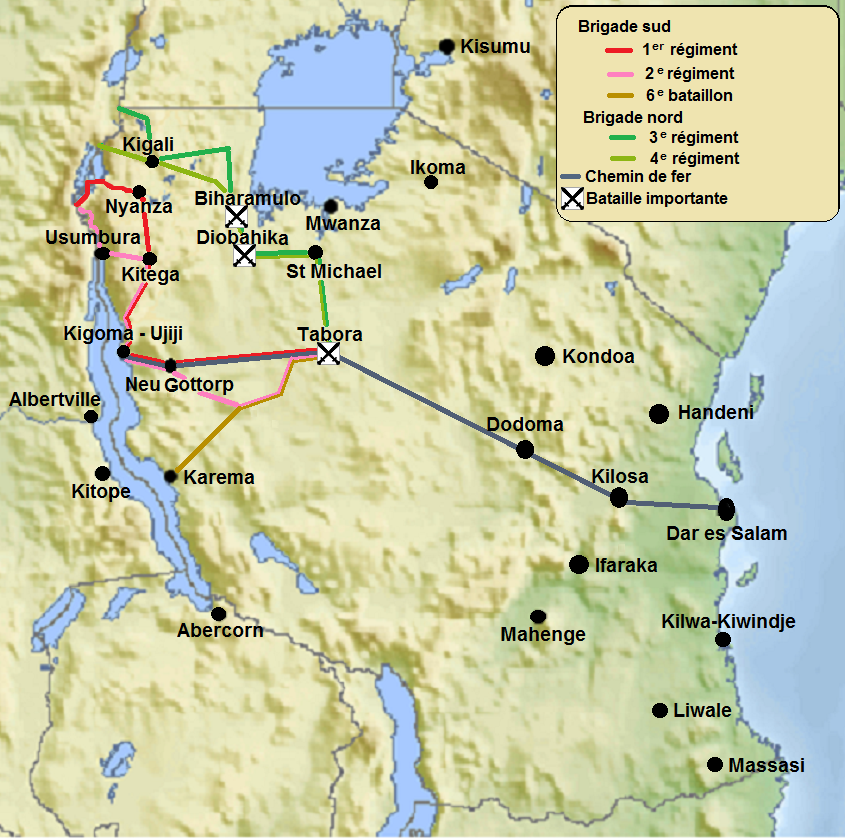
Map of the 1916 campaign by the Force Publique during the East African campaign

In 1914, the Force Publique, including the Katanga companies, totalled about 17,000 askaris with 178 white officers and 235 white NCOs. The majority served in small static garrisons called poste with primarily a police role. With the outbreak of the First World War, the Katangese units were organised in battalions (Ie, IIe, and IIIme) for military service in Northern Rhodesia and the eastern frontier districts of the Belgian Congo. The Force Publique was able to assemble another battalion from smaller units; originally called the IIIe, but changed to the 11e to avoid confusion with the Katanga IIIme battalion.

During the First World War (1914–1918), an expanded Force Publique served against German colonial forces in Kamerun and German East Africa (Tanzania, Rwanda, Burundi), as part of the East African campaign. The Force Publique performed well on the battlefield, winning the respect of their British and Portuguese allies, as well as that of their German opponents.

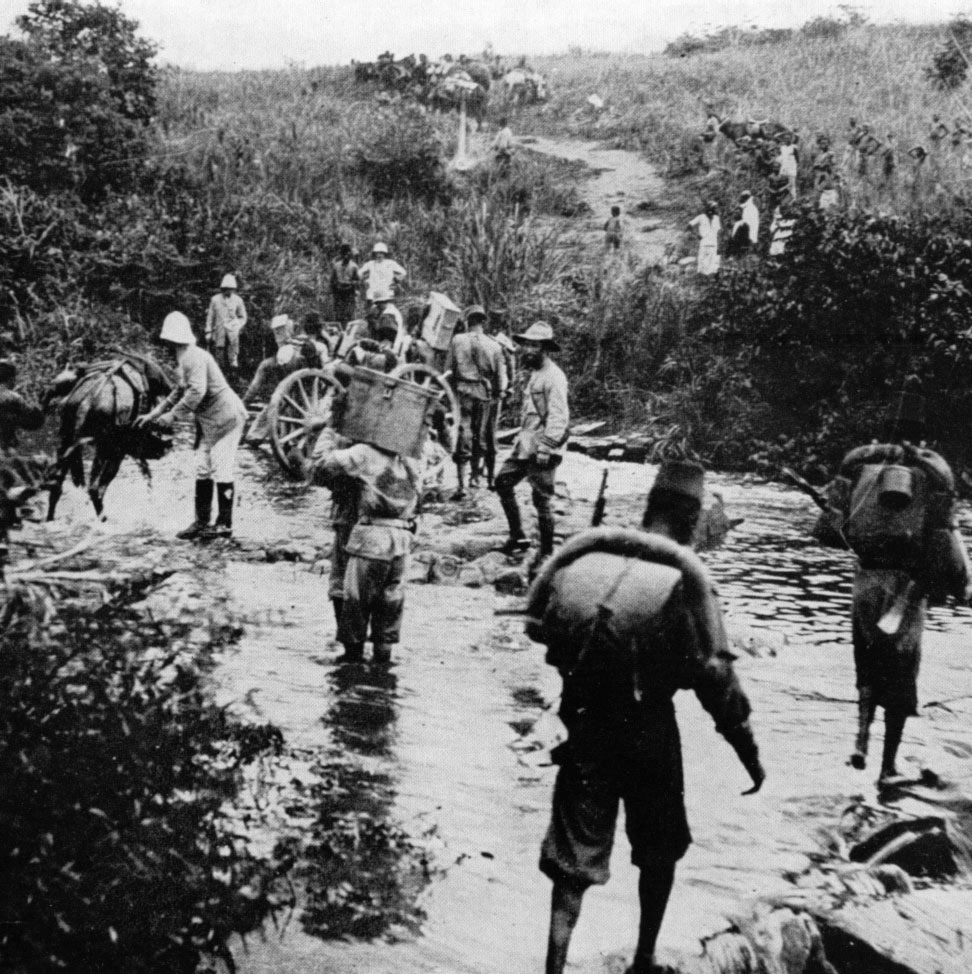
Force Publique troops in German East Africa during World War I

From 1916 onwards, the Force Publique grew to reach a strength of three mobile Groupes (brigades), Kivu, Ruzizi, and Tanganyika, comprising a total of 15 battalions, from the static garrison and police force of 1914. However, it did take until late 1915 for the Force Publique to finish preparations for a large scale offensive on German East Africa. The allied powers, the British Empire and Belgium, launched a coordinated attack on the German colony; by 1916 the Belgian commander of the Force Publique, Lieutenant-General Charles Tombeur, had assembled an army of 15,000 men supported by local bearers and advanced to Kigali. Kigali was taken by 6 May 1916. The German army stationed in Urundi was forced to retreat by the numerical superiority of the Belgian army, and by 17 June 1916, Ruanda-Urundi was occupied. The Force Publique and the British Lake Force then started a thrust to capture Tabora, an administrative centre of central German East Africa. The army went on to take Tabora on 19 September after heavy fighting. At the time of the Battle of Tabora in September 1916, about 25,000 men were under arms; during the war their actions were supported by more than 260,000 local bearers. In 1916, Tombeur was made Military Governor of the Belgian Occupied East African Territories. After the Mahenge offensive and the capture of Mahenge in 1917, the Belgian Congolese army controlled roughly one-third of German East Africa.

=== Interwar period ===
After the First World War, as outlined in the Treaty of Versailles, Germany was forced to cede "control" of the Western section of the former German East Africa to Belgium. On 20 October 1924, Ruanda-Urundi (1924–1945), which consisted of modern-day Rwanda and Burundi, became a League of Nations mandate territory under Belgian administration, with Usumbura as its capital.

On 10 May 1919, the Belgian colonial administration issued a decree formally reorganising the Force Publique into two branches. The troupes campées was tasked with guarding the border and protecting the colony from external aggression, while the troupes en service territoriale was responsible for maintaining internal security. Battalions from the latter were assigned to every provincial capital, while companies were stationed at each district headquarters.

=== Second World War ===
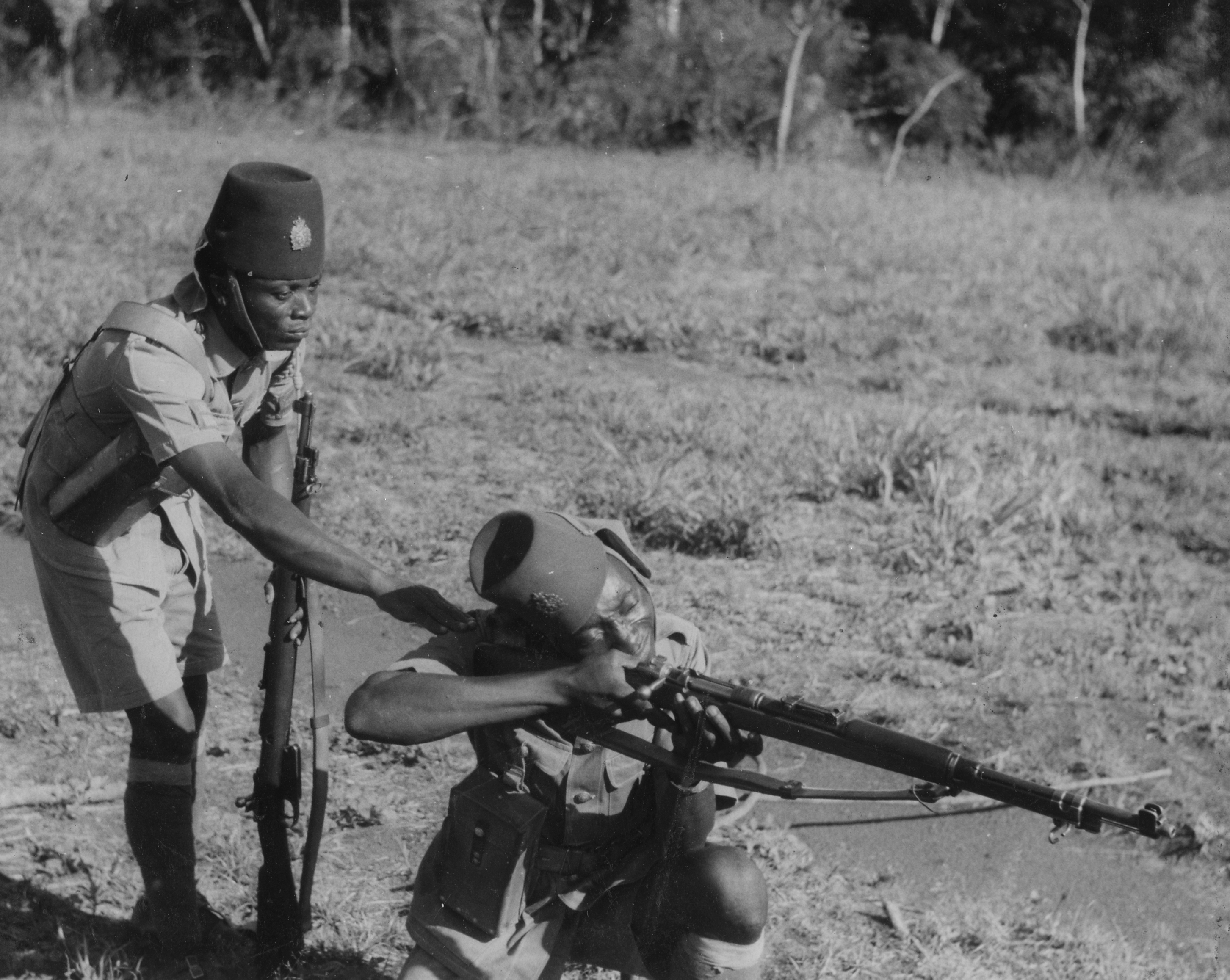
Two Force Publique soldiers in c. 1943

After Belgium had surrendered to Nazi Germany on 28 May 1940, Governor-General Pierre Ryckmans decided that the colony would continue to fight on the side of the Allies. With Belgium occupied, the contribution to the Allied cause by the Free Belgian forces from the Belgian Congo was primarily an economic one providing copper, wolfram, zinc, tin, rubber, cotton and more. Already prior to the war uranium from the Shinkolobwe mine had been shipped to New York; it was later used in the Manhattan Project to produce the atomic bomb for Hiroshima. The military contribution was also important: the Force Publique grew to 40,000 in the course of the War, formed into three brigades, a river force and support units. It provided detachments to fight Italian forces during the East Africa campaign and serve as garrisons in West Africa and the Middle East.

At the end of 1940, the XI^{th} Battalion of the Force Publique was placed at the disposal of the British forces in the Anglo-Egyptian Sudan. The 3rd Brigade of the Force Publique, together with the XI^{th} battalion (5,700 men), took part in the campaign in Abyssinia in Italian East Africa, arriving from the Congo via the Sudan. The troops took Asosa and Gambela with little resistance, and shelled Italian forces at Saïo on 8 June 1941. Their retreat cut off, the Italian troops surrendered to General Auguste-Édouard Gilliaert on 7 July 1941, and included nine generals, among them General Pietro Gazzera and Count Arconovaldo Bonaccorsi, 370 officers, and 2,574 NCOs and 1,533 native soldiers. About 2,000 additional native irregulars were sent home. The Force Publique lost about 500 men during the East Africa Campaign, among them 4 Belgians.

The Force Publique then helped to establish an overland route from Lagos through Fort Lamy and the Sudan to Cairo. Between 1942 and 1943, an expeditionary force of 13,000 was sent to Nigeria. Nine thousand of these troops served in Egypt and Palestine. They returned to the Belgian Congo at the end of 1944 without having seen active service.

The Force Publique also sent the 10th Belgian Congo Casualty Clearing Station to the battle zone. Between 1941 and 1945, some 350 Congolese and 20 Belgians, under the command of Medical Colonel Thomas, worked together with the British medical services in Abyssinia, Somaliland, Madagascar and Burma. They especially proved their value serving with the Indian XXXIII Corps on the Upper Chindwin, where they were attached to the 11th (East Africa) Division. During the confusion inherent in jungle fighting, the Belgian medical unit found itself on one occasion in advance of the front line troops. This incident was later used by British officers to motivate the fighting troops to greater efforts ("even a hospital can do better").

=== Final stages of Belgian rule ===
At the end of 1940, the FP headquarters, recognising the need for aviation support for the force, began forming the Aviation militaire de la Force Publique equipped with requisitioned civilian machines and based at N'Dolo Airport in Leopoldville. The first machine purchased for the force was a de Havilland DH.85 Leopard Moth that entered service on 9 October 1940.

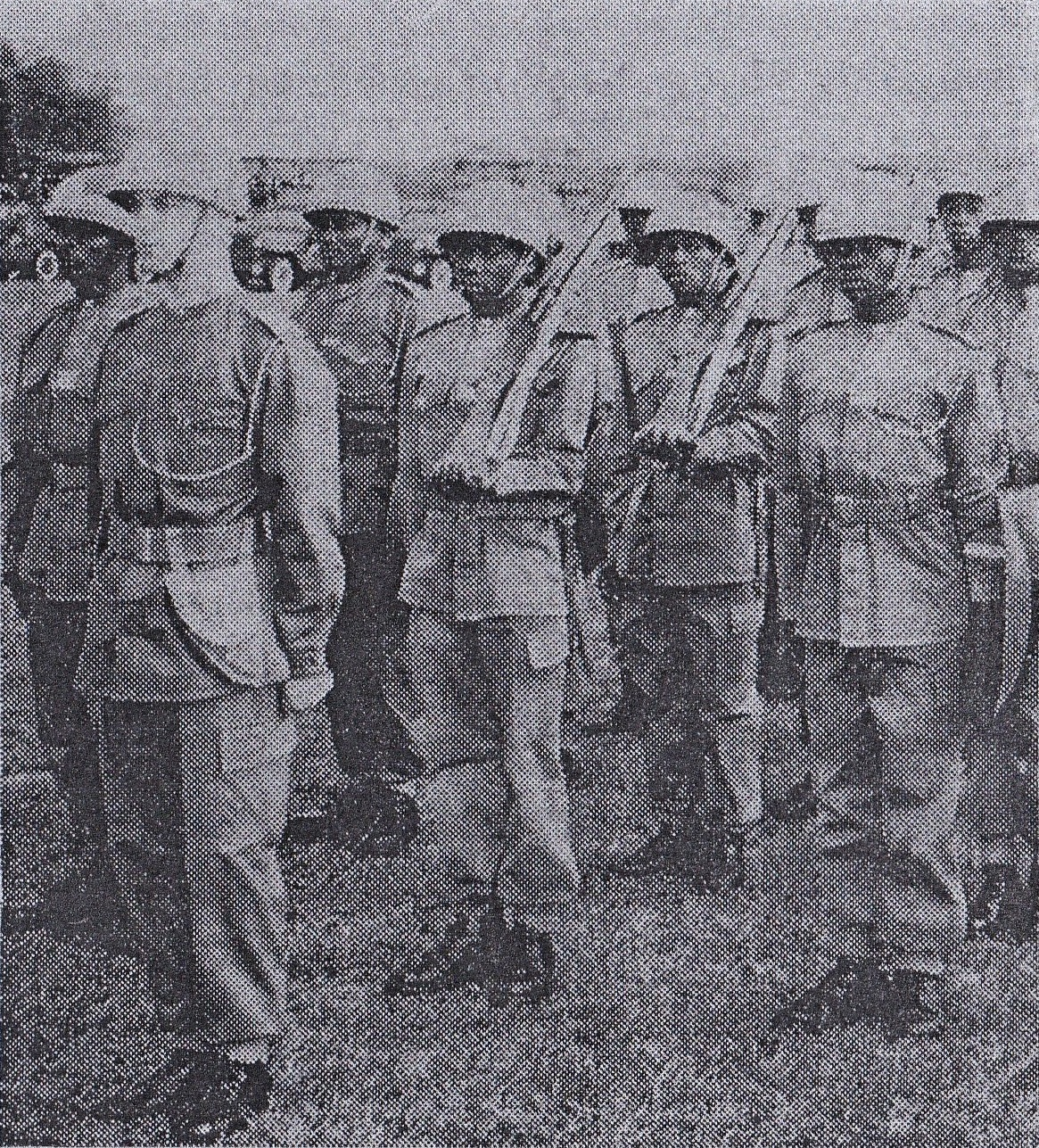
Gendarmerie unit in Léopoldville, 1959

For the remainder of the period of Belgium's rule, the Force Publique continued its joint military and police role, split into territorial units, charged with maintaining public order, and mobile units (between the wars known as unites campees) charged with territorial defence. There was a mutiny by the XIV battalion at Luluabourg in 1944.

In 1945, the FP mobile units consisted of 6 battalions of infantry (the V battalion at Stanleyville, the VI battalion at Watsa, the VIII battalion at Luluabourg, the XI battalion at Rumangabo, the XII battalion at Elizabethville, and the XIII battalion at Léopoldville), 3 reconnaissance units, military police units, a brigade under training at Camp Hardy, still under construction at Thysville, 4 coastal defence guns, and a small aviation element including 2 De Havilland DH.104 Doves.

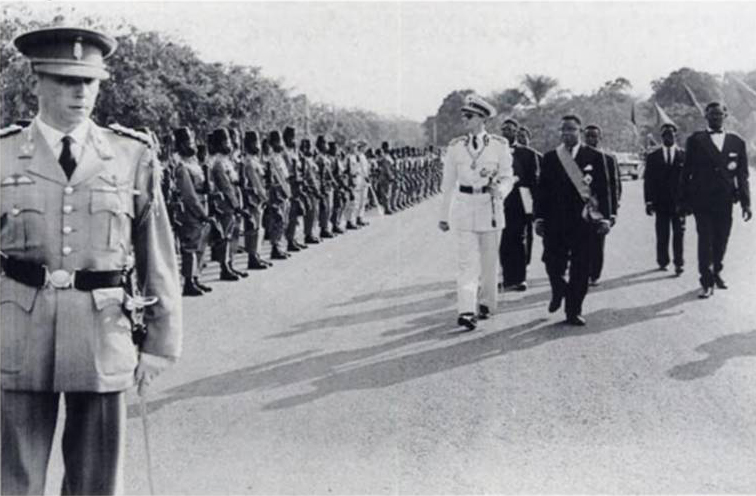
King Baudouin of the Belgians reviews the Force Publique on 29 June 1960, the penultimate day of Belgian rule

Between 1945 and 1960, Belgium continued to organise the Force Publique as an entity cut off from the people that it policed, with recruits serving in tribally mixed units and no more than a quarter of each company coming from the province in which they served. Tightly disciplined and drilled, the Force Publique impressed visitors to the Belgian Congo with its smart appearance, but a culture of separateness, encouraged by its Belgian officers, led to brutal and unrestrained behaviour when the external restraints of colonial administration were lifted in 1960. The infamous chicote was only abolished in 1955. The Belgian Government made no effort to train Congolese commissioned officers until the very end of the Colonial period, and there were only about 20 African officer cadets at military schools in Belgium on the eve of Independence. A separate gendarmerie was organised in 1959 drawn from the Territorial Service Troops of the FP. By July 1959, a total of 40 companies and 28 platoons of gendarmerie were either formed or in training.

In 1960, the Force Publique comprised 3 groupements (Groups) each of which covered two provinces. The 1st groupement had its headquarters at Elisabethville in Katanga Province, according to Louis-Francois Vanderstraeten. The 2nd groupement covered Léopoldville and Equateur. The 3rd groupement, commanded by a colonel whose headquarters was at Stanleyville, grouped F.P. units in Kivu and Orientale Province (PO). It comprised 3 infantry battalions (each of approximately 800 men), seemingly including 6 Battalions at Watsa (under Lieutenant Colonel Merckx in 1960), 2 battalions of Gendarmerie (each of approximately 860 men), a reconnaissance squadron (jeeps, trucks and armoured M8 Greyhound vehicles – approximately 300 men), a transport company, a military police company (approximately 100 men), a heavy mortar platoon, a combat engineer company and a training centre at Lokandu.

=== Organization ===
Vanderstraeten reported the dispositions of the Force Publique in July 1960 as:

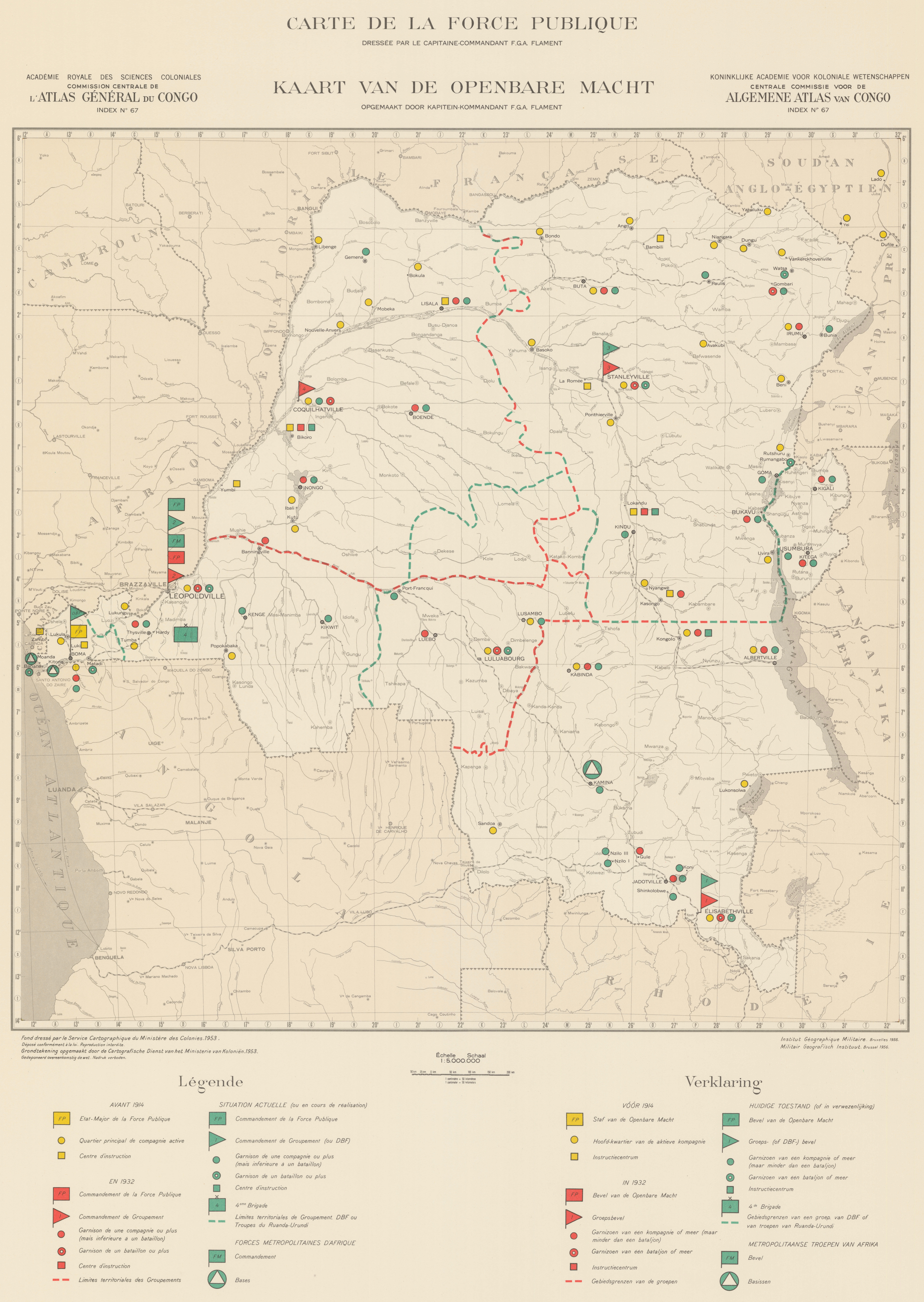
Map showing distribution of the Force Publique, 1956

- Leopoldville Province: Headquarters FP (French: FP QG), HQ 2nd Groupement, the 13th Infantry Battalion, and 15th Gendarmerie Battalion in Leopoldville itself, 4th Brigade with 2nd and 3rd Infantry Battalions at Thysville, along with 2nd Reconnaissance Squadron, HQ Lower River Defences (EM Défense du Bas-Fleuve or EM DBF) at Boma, plus 3 detached gendarmerie companies and 6 detached gendarmerie platoons. The EM DBF probably directed what remained of the coastal defence guns listed above in 1945.
- Equateur Province: HQ 4th Gendarmerie Battalion at Coquilhatville, 2nd Instruction Centre at Irebu (17 OSO, 1214 GS), 3 detached gendarmerie companies, 4 detached gendarmerie platoons. Total estimated personnel in the province was 46 Officiers et sous-officiers (OSO) and 2239 Grades et soldats (GS).
- Province Orientale: HQ 3rd Groupement, 5th Infantry Battalion, and 16th Gendarmerie Battalion at Stanleyville, 6th Infantry Battalion at Watsa, 3rd Reconnaissance Squadron at Gombari, 3 detached gendarmerie companies and 4 detached gendarmerie platoons. Estimated total personnel authorised for the province was 150 OSO and 3456 GS.
- Province de Kivu: 3rd Instruction Centre, Lokandu (17 OSO and 1194 GS), 11th Infantry Battalion at Rumangabo, HQ 7th Gendarmerie Battalion at Bukavu, 2 gendarmerie companies at Bukavu, 2 detached gendarmerie companies, and 4 detached gendarmerie platoons. Estimated total personnel authorised for the province was 76 OSO and 2870 GS.
- Katanga Province: HQ 1st Groupement, 12th Infantry Battalion, 10th Gendarmerie Battalion, one military police company, and groupement logistics units at Elisabethville. 1st Instruction Centre at Kongolo (17 OSO and 1194 GS), 1st Battalion de Garde and an anti-aircraft battery at Kolwezi, 1st Reconnaissance Squadron at Jadotville. Estimated total personnel authorised for the province was 142 OSO and 4438 GS.
- Kasai Province: 9th Gendarmerie Battalion and 8th Infantry Battalion at Luluabourg.

Total strength of the Force Publique immediately prior to independence was 22,403 Congolese regular soldiers and NCOs, 599 European NCOs, and 444 European officers.

=== Commanders ===
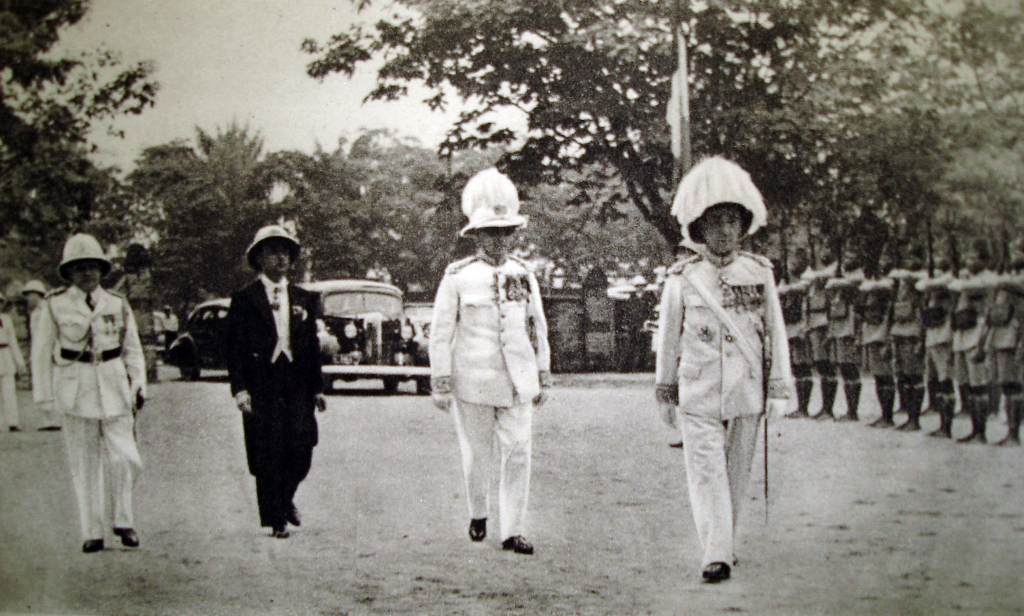
His Excellency Pierre Ryckmans, Governor-General of the Belgian Congo, reviews FP troops at the inauguration of the monument to King Albert I in Léopoldville, 1938

The last 15 commanders of the Force Publique were:

- Lt-Col. Louis Paternoster, May 1907 – December 1907
- Col. Joseph Gomins, May 1908 – May 1909
- Col. Albéric Bruneel, May 1909 – March 1911
- Lt-Col./Col. Auguste Marchant, March 1911 – January 1916
- Maj-Gen. Charles Tombeur, 1916 – May 1918
- Maj-Gen. Philippe Molitor, 1918 – April 1920
- Lt-Col./Col. Frederik-Valdemar Olsen, 1920 – August 1924
- Col./Maj-Gen. Paul Ermens, 1925 – July 1930
- Maj-Gen. Leopold De Koninck, July 1930 – July 1932
- Col. August Servais 1932 – November 1933
- Col/Maj-Gen. Émile Hennequin, April 1935– November 1939
- Lt-Col/Col. Auguste Gilliaert, November 1939– December 1940
- Lt-Gen. Paul Ermens, December 1940 – August 1944
- Maj-Gen./Lt-Gen. Auguste Gilliaert, August 1944 – 1954
- Maj-Gen. Émile Janssens, 1954 – July 1960

== Post-independence ==
On 5 July 1960, five days after the country gained independence from Belgium, the Force Publique garrison in Léopoldville mutinied against its white officers (who had remained in complete command) and attacked numerous European and Congolese targets. The immediate incident sparking the mutiny was reported to have been a tactless speech made by the Belgian general commanding the FP to African soldiers in a mess hall at the main base outside Léopoldville, in which he stated that independence would not bring any change in their status or role. The impact on the soldiers, unsettled by the demands of maintaining order during independence celebrations and fearful that they would be excluded from the benefits of the new freedom, was disastrous. The outbreak caused fear amongst the approximately 100,000 Belgian and other European civilians and officials still resident in the Congo and ruined the credibility of the new government as it proved unable to control its own armed forces. For example, the white community in Luluabourg was besieged in improvised fortifications for three days until rescued by a Belgian Army paratroop drop.

This violence immediately led to a military intervention into Congo by Belgium in an ostensible effort to secure the safety of its citizens (the earlier Luluabourg intervention had been against orders). The re-entry of these forces was a clear violation of the national sovereignty of the new nation, as it had not requested Belgian assistance.

Soon afterwards, after an extraordinary meeting of ministers of the new Congolese Government at Camp Leopold on 8 July, the FP was renamed the Congolese National Army (Armée Nationale Congolaise (ANC)), and its leadership was Africanised.

The chain of events this started eventually resulted in Joseph Mobutu (Mobutu Sésé Seko), a former sergeant-major in the FP who had been promoted to Chief of Staff of the ANC by Prime Minister Patrice Lumumba, gaining power and establishing his dictatorial kleptocracy. His regime was to remain in power until May 1997.

== Aviation ==
Prior to independence, the air component of the Force Publique (Avi / or Avimil, Aviation militaire de la Force publique) was based mainly at the N'Dolo airport, Leopoldville. Avimil's roles included the transportation of passengers, medical supplies and other goods, as well as undertaking connecting flights and recognition duties. Between 1944 and 1960 the following unarmed aircraft and helicopters were used by Avimil:

- Stampe Vertongen SV 7-4B (V-40 to 46)
- Airspeed Oxford Mk.I AS.10 6 (A-21 to 26)
- Airspeed Consul AS.65 6 (C-31 to 36)
- 12 De Havilland DH.104 Dove (D-10 to 22)
- 1 De Havilland DH.114 Heron 2 (OO-CGG)
- 2 Sikorsky H-19D (S-41 & 42)
- Two Sikorsky S-55 (S-43 & 44)
- 3 Sud Aviation Alouette II SE.3130 (Artouste) (A-51 to 53)
- 3 Piper L-18C Super Cub (P-61 to 63)

At independence on 30 June 1960, Avimil was placed under the control of the new government of the Republic of the Congo, and continued its missions until 20 July 1960. On this date the chief of Belgian forces in the Congo ordered the assembly of non-Congolese personnel and operational aircraft ('des appareils en état de vol') at the Belgian base at Kamina. On 23 August they were transferred to Elizabethville, and on 26 August officially turned over to the secessionist State of Katanga.

== Former members ==
=== Officers ===
- Edward A. Burke
- Lindsay Burke
- Louis Napoléon Chaltin
- Camille Coquilhat
- Alexandre Delcommune
- Francis Dhanis
- Paul Ermens
- Leopold De Koninck
- Auguste-Édouard Gilliaert
- Émile Janssens
- Finn Kjelstrup
- Kristian Løken
- Mathieu Pelzer
- Thorleiv Røhn
- Leon Rom
- Louis Royaux
- Pierre Ryckmans
- Charles Tombeur
- Edmond Van der Meersch
- Guillaume Vankerckhoven

=== Soldiers ===
- Louis Bobozo
- Isaac Kalonji
- Daniel Kanza
- Justin Kokolo
- Victor Koumorico
- Victor Lundula
- Joseph Makula
- Joseph-Désiré Mobutu
- Albert Kunyuku, last surviving Belgian Congolese veteran of the group

== See also ==
- Armed Forces of the Democratic Republic of the Congo
- 1940–1945 African War Medal
- Archives Africaines (Brussels) has records of the Force Publique

== Bibliography ==
- Abbott, Peter (2009) [1st pub. 2002]. Armies in East Africa 1914–18 (8th ed.). Oxford: Osprey Publishing. ISBN 9781841764894.
- Abbott, Peter (2014). Modern African Wars (4) Congo 1960–2002. Oxford: Osprey Publishing. ISBN 978-1-78200-076-1.
- Des Forges, Alison (2011). Defeat Is the Only Bad News: Rwanda under Musinga, 1896–1931. Madison, Wisconsin: University of Wisconsin Press. ISBN 978-0299281441.
- Adam Hochschild: King Leopold's Ghost: A Story of Greed, Terror and Heroism in Colonial Africa, Houghton Mifflin Company 1998
- Louis-François Vanderstraeten, De la Force Publique à l'armée nationale congolaise : Histoire d'une mutinerie, Académie royale de Belgique, Brussels, Impression decidee le 18 avril 1983, 613 p. + pl. ISBN 2-8031-0050-9.
- Osterhammel, Jürgen (2015). The Transformation of the World: A Global History of the Nineteenth Century. Translated by Patrick Camiller. Princeton, New Jersey; Oxford: Princeton University Press. ISBN 978-0691169804.
- Strizek, Helmut (2006). Geschenkte Kolonien: Ruanda und Burundi unter deutscher Herrschaft; mit einem Essay über die Entwicklung bis zur Gegenwart [Gifted colonies: Rwanda and Burundi under German rule; with an essay on the development up to the present] (in German). Berlin: Ch. Links. ISBN 978-3-86153-390-0.
- Sonck, Jean-Pierre (April 2001). "L'Aviation Coloniale Belge (1940–1941)" [Belgian Colonial Aviation (1940–1941)]. Avions: Toute l'Aéronautique et son histoire (in French) (97): 17–22. ISSN 1243-8650.
- Sonck, Jean-Pierre (May 2001). "L'Aviation Coloniale Belge (1940–1941)". Avions: Toute l'Aéronautique et son histoire (in French) (98): 54–56. ISSN 1243-8650.
- Thomas, Martin (2012). Violence and Colonial Order: Police, Workers and Protest in the European Colonial Empires, 1918–1940. Cambridge University Press. ISBN 9781139576550.
