= Philippe Molitor =

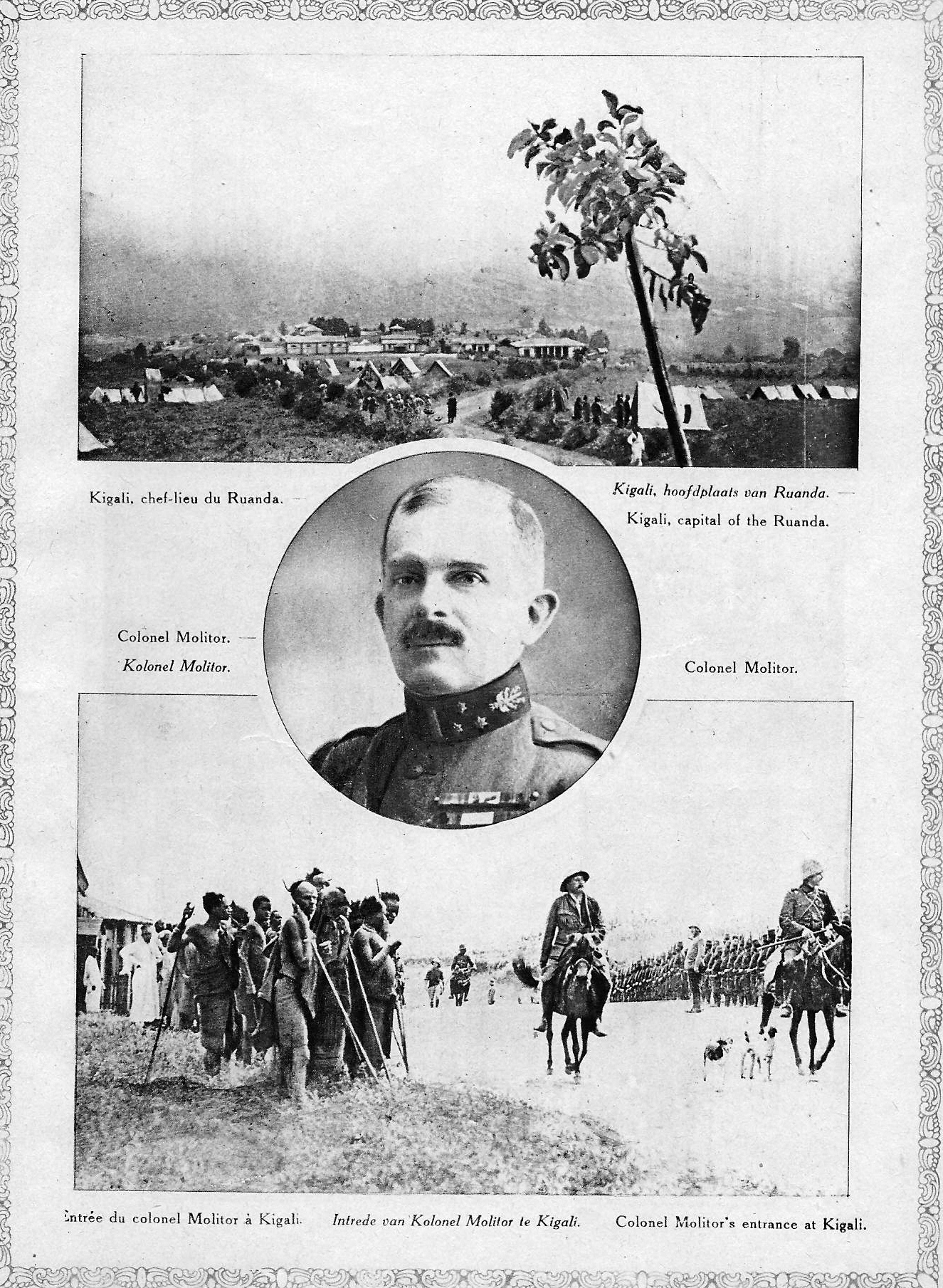
- Molitor in Kigali
- Born: 11 June 1869; Libin, Belgium
- Died: 27 October 1952 (aged 83); Brussels, Belgium
- Military career
- Allegiance: Belgium: Belgian Congo
- Rank: Lieutenant general
- Commands: Force Publique
- Conflicts: World War I; East African Campaign; Tabora Offensive

Philippe Molitor (11 June 1869 – 27 October 1952) was a Belgian military officer. He is known for his role as commander of the Brigade Nord of the Force Publique, during the Tabora Offensive in the East African campaign.

== Military career ==
At the age of 16 he joined the Belgian 1st regiment of Carabiniers as a volunteer. In 1886 Molitor won an appointment to the Royal Military Academy in Brussels. He graduated in 1889, and was commissioned as second lieutenant in the 2e régiment de Chasseurs à Pied. In 1900 he was assigned a job at the Ministry of War and from 1906 to 1909 he was the Batman of general Jacoby.

In 1912 he was commissioned as major in the Force Publique and in 1913 he was responsible for inspecting the military posts on the eastern border of the Belgian Congo in the Province Orientale. In 1913-14 he warned the Belgian government in a paper of what he called 'the German threat' in German East Africa and advised to reform and strengthen the Force Publique, while the colonial officials at that time stressed the importance of the neutrality of the Belgian Congo. In 1915 Molitor was assigned to form the Brigade Nord which he was to command during the Tabora Offensive. At the end of April 1916 Molitor advanced to German East Africa, his brigade occupied Kigali on 6 May 1916, Biharamulo on 24 June and St. Michaël on 21 August. His brigade faced supply difficulties, and because of the absence of a railway line from Kigali to Tabora, he was to advance at a slower pace than Brigade Sud.

In 1918 Molitor was appointed to reorganize the Force Publique and was promoted to the rank of major general. In 1919 he was sent back to Belgium and assumed command of the 5th infantry division, in 1923 he was promoted to lieutenant general and took command of the 1st infantry division. General Molitor retired in 1928.

After his military career he continued to advocate the strengthening of the Force Publique, mainly in the years prior to the second world war. Molitor strongly opposed racial discrimination, calling racism «une infirmité mentale».
