= Mimi and Toutou Go Forth =

2004 book by Giles Foden

Mimi and Toutou Go Forth: The Bizarre Battle for Lake Tanganyika
- First edition
- Author: Giles Foden
- Cover artist: Matilda Hunt
- Language: English
- Genre: non-fiction
- Publisher: Michael Joseph
- Publication date: 30 September 2004
- Publication place: United Kingdom
- Media type: Print (Hardback & Paperback)
- Pages: 256 pp (first edition, hardback)
- ISBN: 0-7181-4555-0 (first edition, hardback)
- OCLC: 56648271

Mimi and Toutou Go Forth: The Bizarre Battle for Lake Tanganyika is the fourth book by author Giles Foden. It was published in 2004 by Michael Joseph. The United States edition, published in 2005 by Knopf, is entitled Mimi and Toutou's Big Adventure: The Bizarre Battle of Lake Tanganyika.

The book tells the story of a British naval expedition in World War I, which travelled thousands of miles through the Belgian Congo to Lake Tanganyika in Central Africa in order to win control of the lake from the Germans with just two boats - Mimi and Toutou.

According to academic Dirk Göttsche the book gives a critical postcolonial perspective and assessment on colonialism. This is reflected through grotesque and absurd actions of the actors involved, specifically those of Geoffrey Spicer-Simson.

== Summary ==
During World War One, German warships controlled Lake Tanganyika, which is the longest Lake in the world and was of great strategic value in Central Africa at the time. The British had no naval craft at all upon 'Tanganjikasee' (as the Germans called it). After the sinking of the Belgian steamer Alexandre Del Commune and through the actions of a British informant known as Lee and his observations of the two German warships, including the Hedwig von Wissman, the British Admiralty and Admiral Sir David Gamble decided that a naval expedition was needed to retake the Lake from the Germans. They were unaware of the existence of a much larger German vessel on the lake, the Graf von Götzen.

So, in June 1915, a force of 28 men was dispatched from Britain on a long journey. Their commanding officer was an eccentric naval officer called Geoffrey Spicer-Simson who was known for being the oldest Lieutenant Commander in the Royal Navy, a man court-martialled for wrecking his own ships and a liar. He was given command of two small gunboats, which he named Mimi and Toutou (childish onomatopoeia for "Cat" and "Dog" in French). After a monthlong journey to South Africa via the Atlantic Ocean, the boats and expedition travelled by train to the Congo. There, with great difficulty, the expedition carried the two boats, with the aid of steam engines and mules, to the edge of Lake Tanganyika.

They captured one ship, the Kingani, and named her Fifi; they also sank the Hedwig von Wissman, but did not engage the formidable Graf von Götzen, which remained dominant on the lake until she was scuttled in the wake of an Anglo-Belgian attack overland on German positions.

== Present ==
The scuttled ship Graf von Götzen was raised and now operates on the lake as the MV Liemba.

== See also ==
- HMS Mimi and HMS Toutou
- East African Campaign (World War I)

== Bibliography ==
- Foden, Giles (30 September 2004). Mimi and Toutou Go Forth: The Bizarre Battle for Lake Tanganyika (1st ed.). London: Michael Joseph.
