= Battle for Lake Tanganyika =

Battle of World War I in East Africa

- Part of the East African Campaign of the First World War
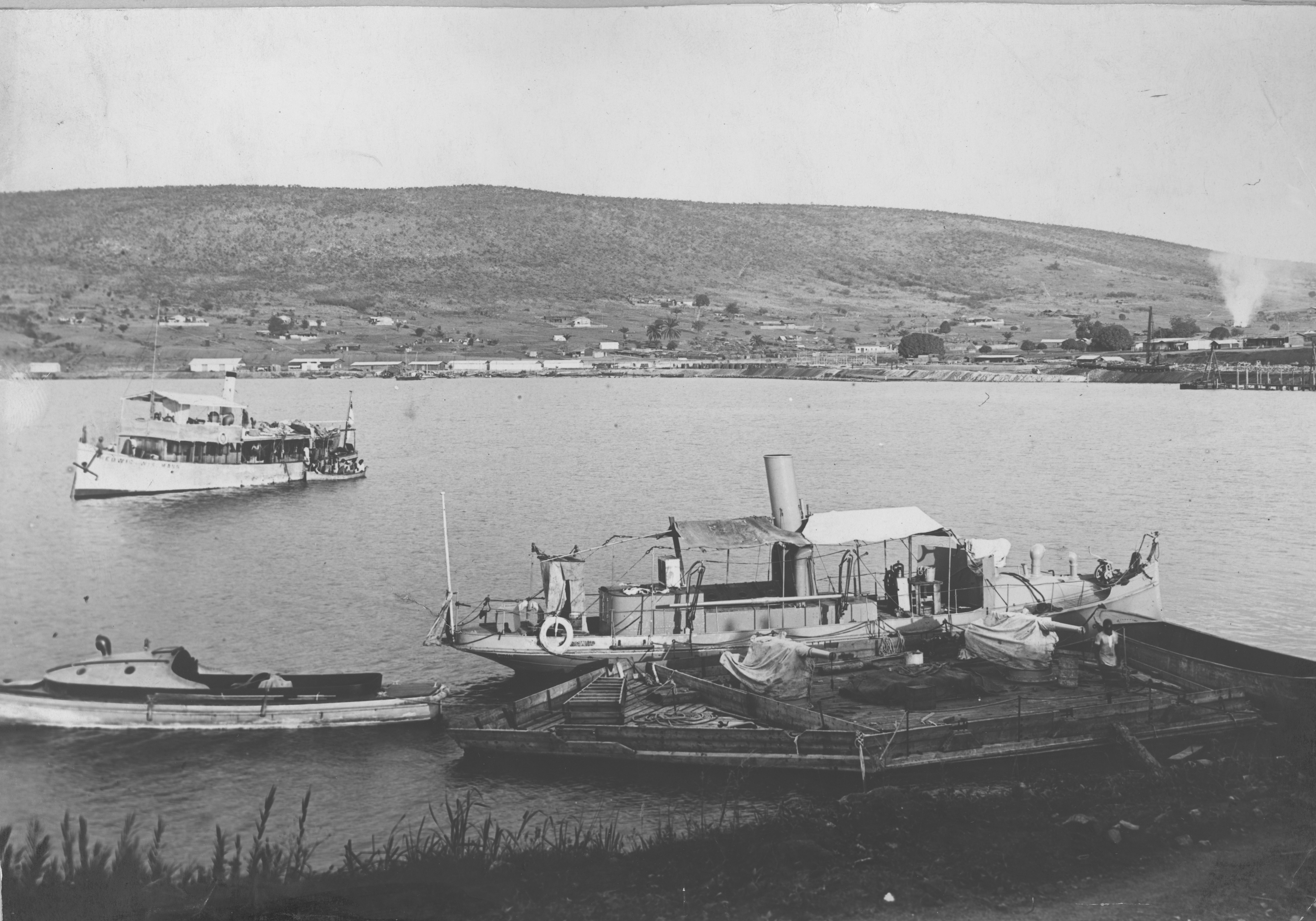
- Lake Tanganyika in 1914, contested by Britain, Belgium and Germany
Date	26 December 1915 – July 1916
Location	Lake Tanganyika, Africa 6.5000°S 29.8333°E
Result	Entente victory

Belligerents
Britain; Belgium: Belgian Congo	German Empire: German East Africa

Commanders and leaders
(United Kingdom) Geoffrey Spicer-Simson (Belgian Congo) Georges Moulaert	(German Empire) Gustav Zimmer

Strength
British: 2 steamers 3 armed boats Belgian: 1 steamer 1 armed boat 1 armed barge 1 whaler 4 aircraft unknown shore batteries	2 steamers 1 ferry unknown dhows 1 fort unknown shore batteries

Casualties and losses
British: No human losses 1 armed boat damaged Belgian: 1 steamer sunk	~12 killed 2 wounded 32 captured 1 steamer sunk 1 ferry scuttled 1 steamer captured
- The sunken Belgian steamer Alexandre del Commune was later refloated and assigned to the British flotilla as HMS Vengeur.; The German steamer Kingani was captured and assigned to the British flotilla as HMS Fifi.
- Location within Tanzania Battle for Lake Tanganyika (Africa)

The Battle for Lake Tanganyika was a series of naval engagements that took place between elements of the Royal Navy, Force Publique and the Kaiserliche Marine between December 1915 and July 1916, during the First World War. The intention was to secure control of the strategically important Lake Tanganyika, which had been dominated by German naval units since the beginning of the war. The British forces – consisting of two motor boats named HMS Mimi and Toutou – were under the command of the eccentric Lieutenant-Commander Geoffrey Spicer-Simson. The boats were transported to South Africa and from there by railway, by river, and by being dragged through the African jungle, to the lake.

In two short engagements, the small motor boats attacked and defeated two of their German opponents. In the first action, on 26 December 1915 Kingani was damaged and captured, becoming HMS Fifi. In the second, the small flotilla overwhelmed and sank Hedwig von Wissmann. The Germans maintained a third large and heavily armed craft on the lake, Graf von Götzen; this craft was attacked indecisively by Belgian aircraft and was subsequently scuttled. Developments in the land-based conflict caused the Germans to withdraw from the lake, and control of the surface of Lake Tanganyika passed to the British and Belgians.

== Background ==
=== Strategic situation ===
Lake Tanganyika lies between what was then the Belgian Congo on the western side and German East Africa on the eastern side. By the start of the war, the Germans had two warships on Lake Tanganyika: the 60 t (59 long tons; 66 short tons) Hedwig von Wissmann, and the 45 t (44 long tons; 50 short tons) Kingani. Hedwig von Wissmann was quickly armed with four pom-pom guns taken from the scuttled survey ship Möwe and sailed out to the port of Lukuga on the Belgian side of the lake, where on 22 August she attacked the Belgian steamer Alexandre Del Commune, sinking her after two further raids.

This gave the Germans unchallenged superiority on the lake, with their position strengthened further with the sinking of the British African Lakes Corporation's steamer Cecil Rhodes in a raid in November 1914. The Germans used their control of the lake to launch an attack on northern Rhodesia, led by Major-General Kurt Wahle. This was beaten back, but further raids on Belgian territory and bombardments of Lukuga convinced the Belgians to support the British.

Despite this undertaking, there was little the Belgians or British could do to challenge the Germans. The Belgians had the components for a large steamer, Baron Dhanis, which if it could be assembled would be considerably larger than either Kingani or Hedwig von Wissmann, but did not dare to start construction on her while the Germans patrolled the lake for fear that she would be destroyed before she could be launched. The British had sent two 12-pounder guns to arm her with, but with little prospect of being able to launch her, the Belgians were instead using them as shore batteries to defend Lukuga.

German control of the lake was significant for the whole campaign in the central African theatre. While the British could muster troops to the south of the lake, and the Belgians had troops to the north, neither could push into German East Africa because of the risk that the Germans would use their boats to transport troops across the lake, and use them to cut their supply and communications lines.

=== Lee's plan ===
On 21 April 1915, John R. Lee—a big game hunter and veteran of the Second Boer War—arrived at the Admiralty to meet Admiral Sir Henry Jackson. Lee had been in Eastern Africa and had personally observed the German ships on Lake Tanganyika. He also brought the news that the Germans were preparing to launch a new ship from their fortified port of Kigoma.^{[a]} Named Graf von Götzen, she had been constructed at the Meyer shipyard at Papenburg, disassembled and packed into 5,000 crates and transported to Dar-es-Salaam. From there, she had been brought by rail to Kigoma and assembled in secret. 220 ft (67 m) long and displacing 1,575 long tons (1,600 t), she would cement German control of the lake and allow 800–900 troops to be rapidly transported to any point on the lakeshore to raid into allied territory.

To counter this threat, Lee proposed that motor gunboats be sent to Africa and transported through the interior to the lake. They would be small and highly manoeuvrable, and—if armed with a gun with a range of 7,000 yd (6,400 m)—could both outrun and outgun the larger German ships. Using small vessels that could be transported intact meant that they could be launched immediately onto the lake, eliminating the risk of their discovery and destruction while being assembled. Sir Henry considered the plan and approved it with the words "It is both the duty and the tradition of the Royal Navy to engage the enemy wherever there is water to float a ship." Jackson passed the task of finalising the details of the operation to his junior, Admiral David Gamble. Gamble appointed Lee second in command of the expedition, and placed Lieutenant-Commander Geoffrey Spicer-Simson in charge.

Spicer-Simson was a man described by Giles Foden as "a man court-martialled for wrecking his own ships, an inveterate liar and a wearer of skirts." He had reached the rank of lieutenant-commander but had not progressed further owing to a number of mistakes and disasters, which left him in a small office in the Admiralty assigned to helping with the process of transferring merchant seamen into the navy. In 1905, he had come up with the idea of stringing a cable between two destroyers to sweep for periscopes and nearly sank a submarine. He ran another ship aground while testing the defences of Portsmouth Harbour, and later collided with and sank a small boat, killing a man. By the outbreak of war, he was in command of HMS Niger and a small flotilla at Ramsgate. He went ashore to entertain guests at a nearby hotel, from whose windows he watched Niger being torpedoed and sank. He had nevertheless commanded a survey vessel on the Gambia River and, due to a shortage of officers, was selected to take command. Lee went out to prepare the way through Africa, while Spicer-Simson assembled 27 men and two motor boats that had been built by John I. Thornycroft & Company to fulfil an order made by the Greek government before the war.

=== The journey of Mimi and Toutou ===
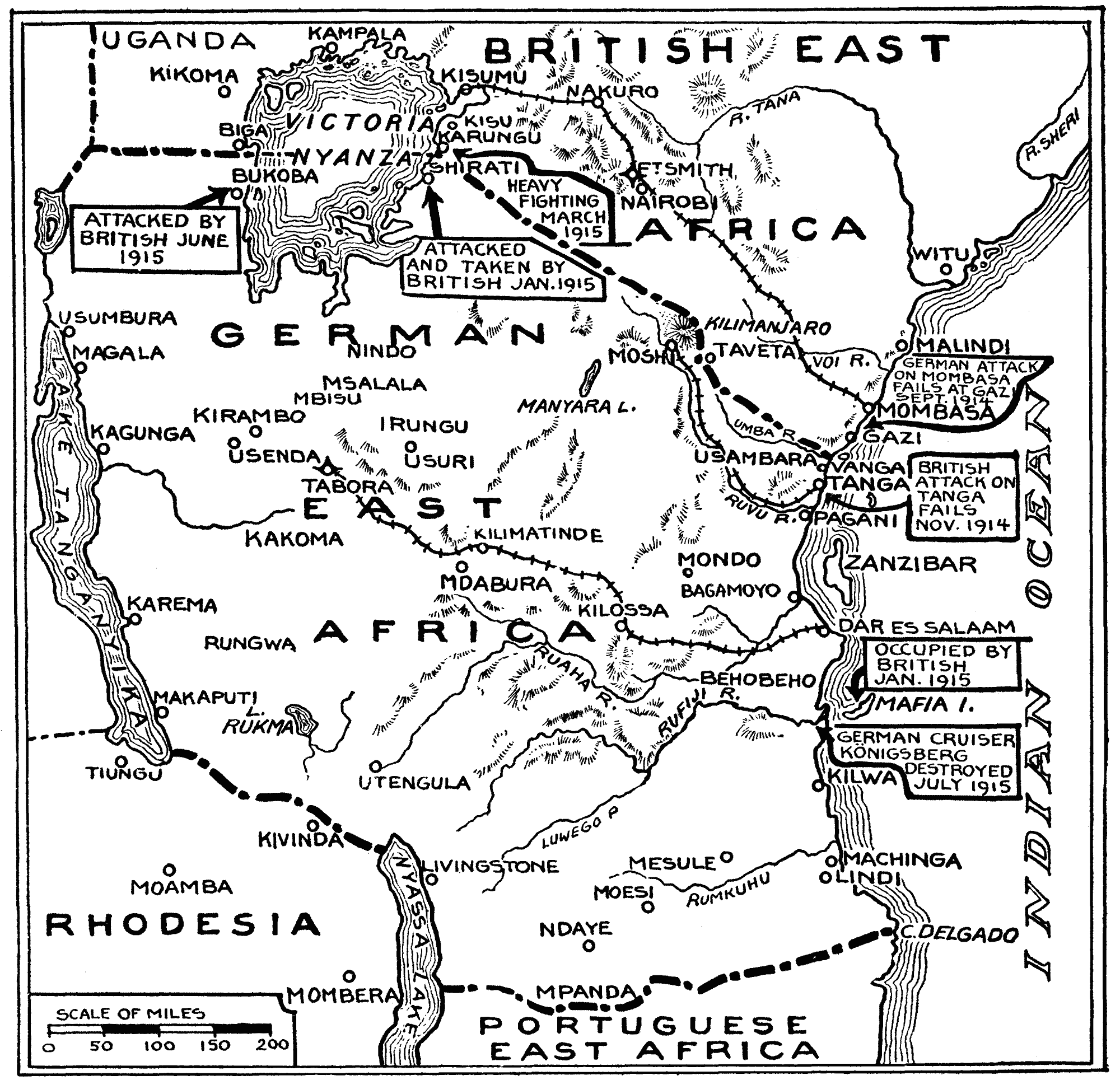
A map of German East Africa, with Lake Tanganyika at the extreme left

The British naval force consisted of two 40-foot-long (12 m) motor boats. Spicer-Simson suggested they be named Cat and Dog, but the names were rejected by the Admiralty. Spicer-Simson then suggested Mimi and Toutou as alternatives, which were accepted. As he later explained, these meant "Miaow" and "Bow-wow" in French. Their crews were assembled from acquaintances of Spicer-Simson, or from the ranks of the Royal Naval Reserve. Spicer-Simson proposed a number of improvements to the original design; they were cut down to improve their speed, Maxim guns and a 3-pounder Hotchkiss gun were fitted, though the Hotchkiss had to be fired from a kneeling position, and extra steel linings were added to the petrol tanks. The boats were tested on the Thames on 8 June, where arrangements had been made for Mimi to fire a practice shell from her 3-pounder. The shell hit the target, but both gun and gunner flew into the river, as the gun had not been properly bolted to the deck. The boats were loaded aboard SS Llanstephen Castle on 15 June, along with special trailers and cradles to allow them to be transported by rail or overland, and the expedition's equipment and supplies. Once they arrived in South Africa, they would have to be carried over 3,000 mi (4,800 km) inland, including the traversing of an 1,800-metre-high (5,900 ft) mountain range. Meanwhile, on 8 June Graf von Götzen was launched on Lake Tanganyika.

The first leg of Mimi and Toutou′s 10,000 mi (16,000 km) journey was completed after 17 days at sea and their arrival at the Cape. From Cape Town, they and the men of the expedition travelled north by railway through Bulawayo to Elisabethville, where they arrived on 26 July. After travelling to the railhead at Fungurume, they were detrained and dragged 146 mi (235 km) through the bush by teams of oxen and steam tractors to the beginnings of the railway from Sankisia to Bukama. At Bukama, the boats and stores were unloaded and prepared for a voyage down the Lualaba River, where despite running aground several times and being forced to take passage on a Belgian river steamer they completed their journey after sailing through Lake Kisale and arrived at Kabalo on 22 October. From there, a small railway took them to just short of the Belgian port of Lukuga, on the shore of Lake Tanganyika. Here Spicer-Simson met the Belgian army commander, Commandant Stinghlamber, and the naval commander, Commandant Goor, and preparations were made to launch Mimi and Toutou and to seek out the Germans.

=== Belgian and German preparations ===
The Germans had made use of the loss of the survey ship Möwe by taking some of her crew, and men from the merchant ships of the Deutsche Ost-Afrika Linie, and using them to man their ships. The German position on the lake had been further strengthened with the loss of the cruiser SMS Königsberg in the Rufiji River in July. Guns from Königsberg arrived at the German base at Kigoma, and the German naval commander on the lake, Captain Gustav Zimmer, had one of Königsberg′s 105 mm (4.1 in) SK L/40 Schnelladekanone (i.e. quick-firing gun) mounted on Götzen. Members of Königsberg′s crew also made their way to join his forces, and Zimmer placed former crewmember Lieutenant Job Rosenthal in command of Kingani. Job Odebrecht commanded Hedwig, while Zimmer himself commanded Götzen.

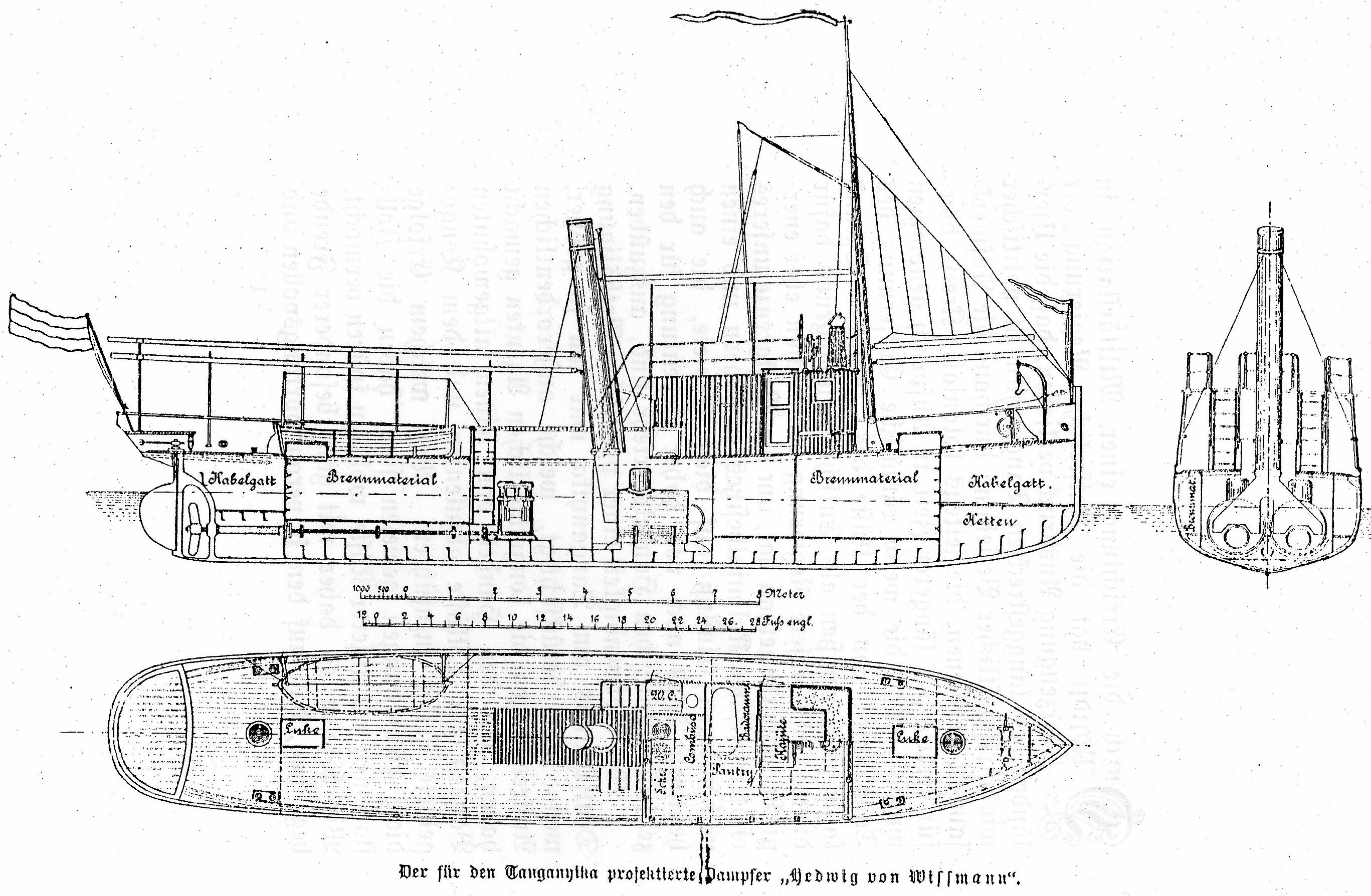
Plan of Hedwig von Wissmann.

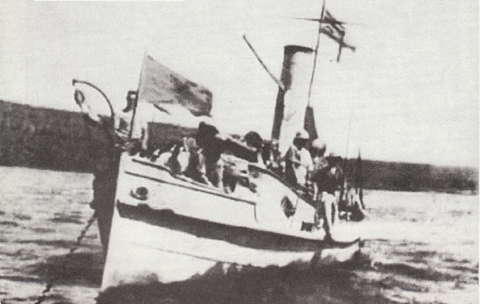
Kingani later HMS Fifi

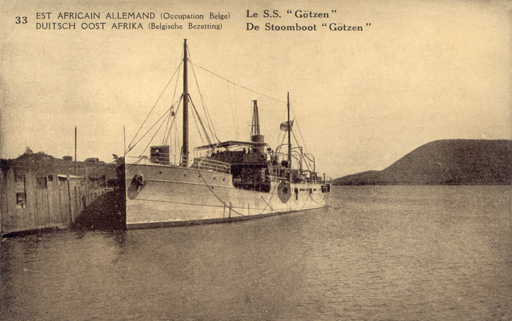
Graf Goetzen

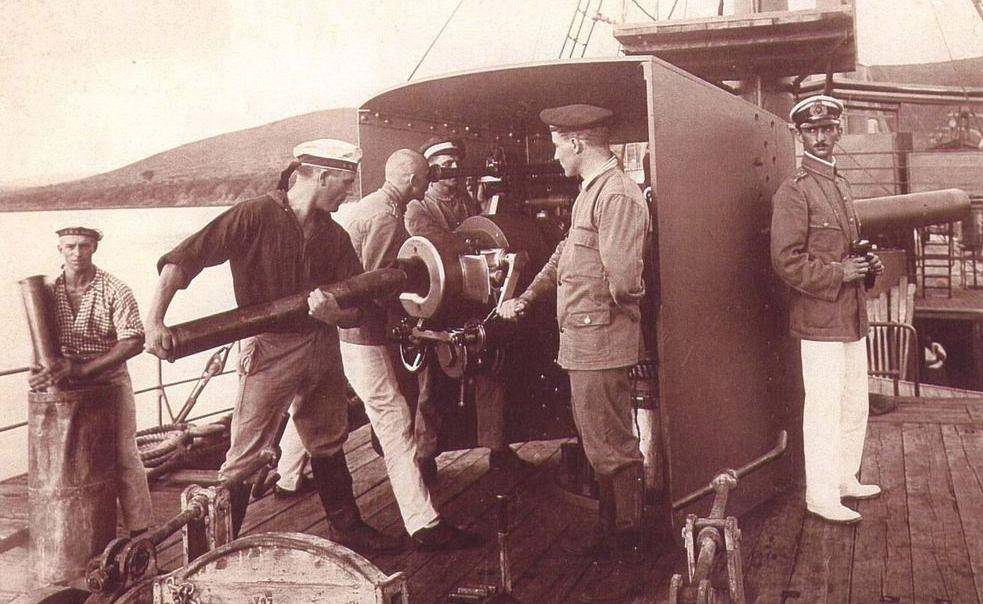
German crew manning Graf Goetzen′s naval gun.

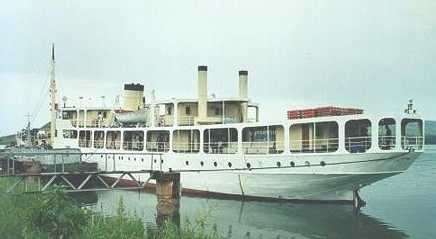
Graf von Götzen in her modern guise as MV Liemba.

Against this formidable force, the Belgians could only muster a petrol-driven barge armed with two cannon named Dix-Tonne, a motor boat named Netta, and a whaler fitted with an outboard motor. Goor hoped to bring into commission the as-yet unassembled Baron Dhanis, and the hulk of Alexandre del Commune, which had been sunk early in the war by Hedwig von Wissmann. Zimmer may have been aware that the British were planning to launch ships on the lake, but he was also concerned that Baron Dhanis might be assembled and launched. The 1,500 long tons (1,500 t) Baron Dhanis was not necessarily a threat to Götzen in port, but he was determined to maintain his freedom of movement on the lake. Lacking concrete information he sent Rosenthal aboard Kingani to reconnoitre Lukuga.

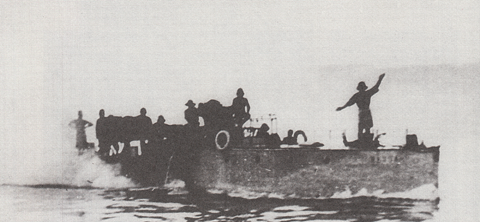
Spicer-Simson (standing) on the Belgian torpedo boat Netta.

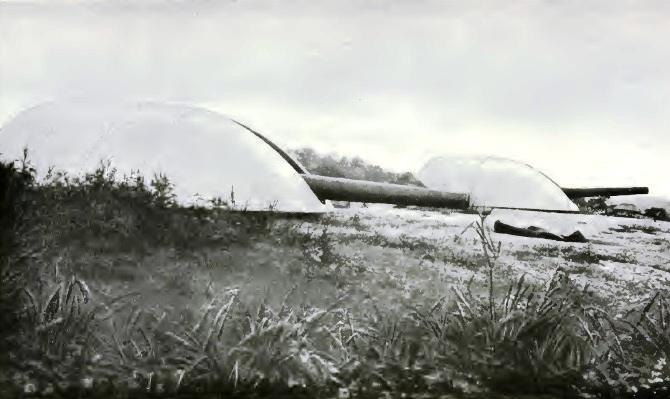
Coastal defense of Albertville

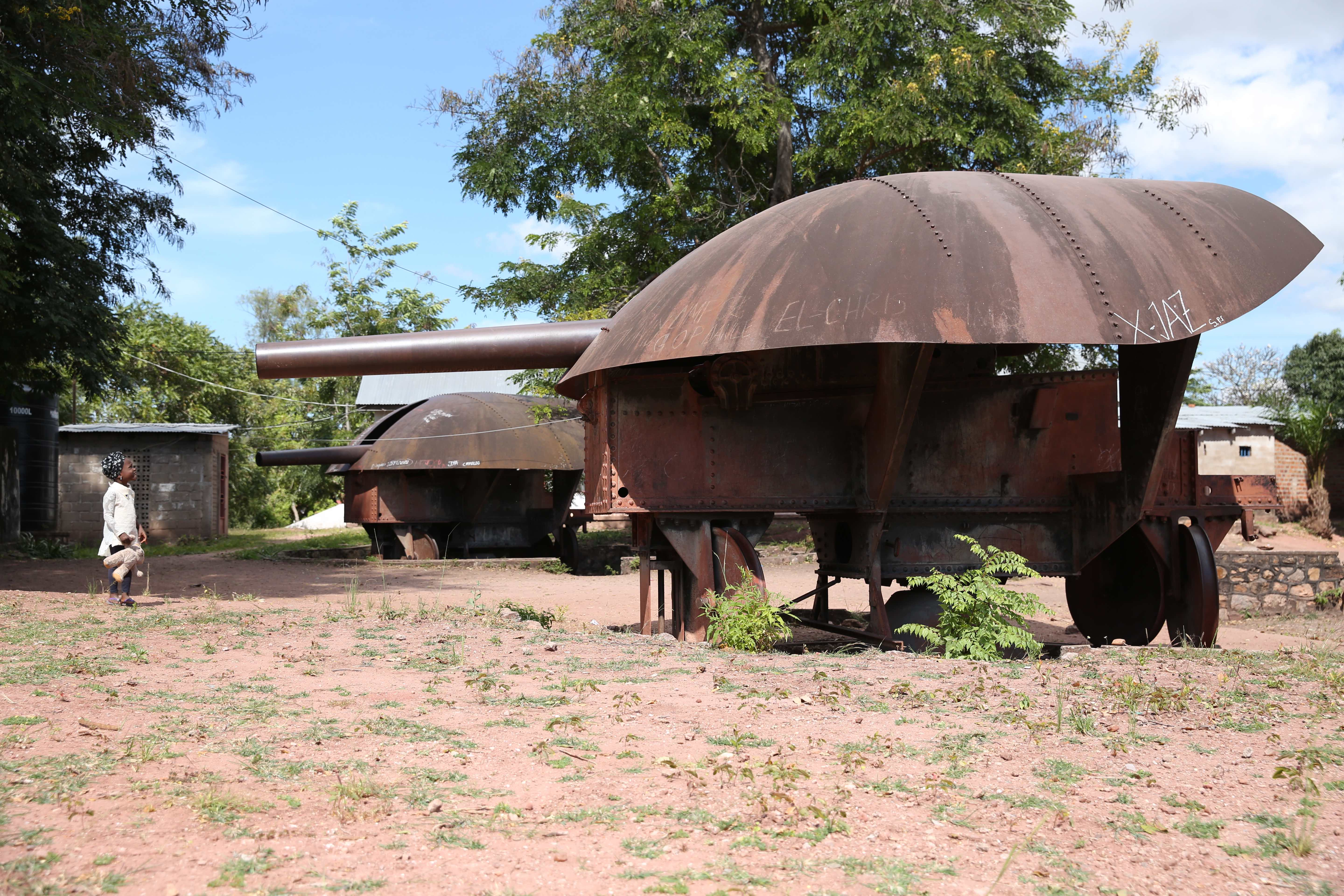
Krupp Coastal defense guns today.

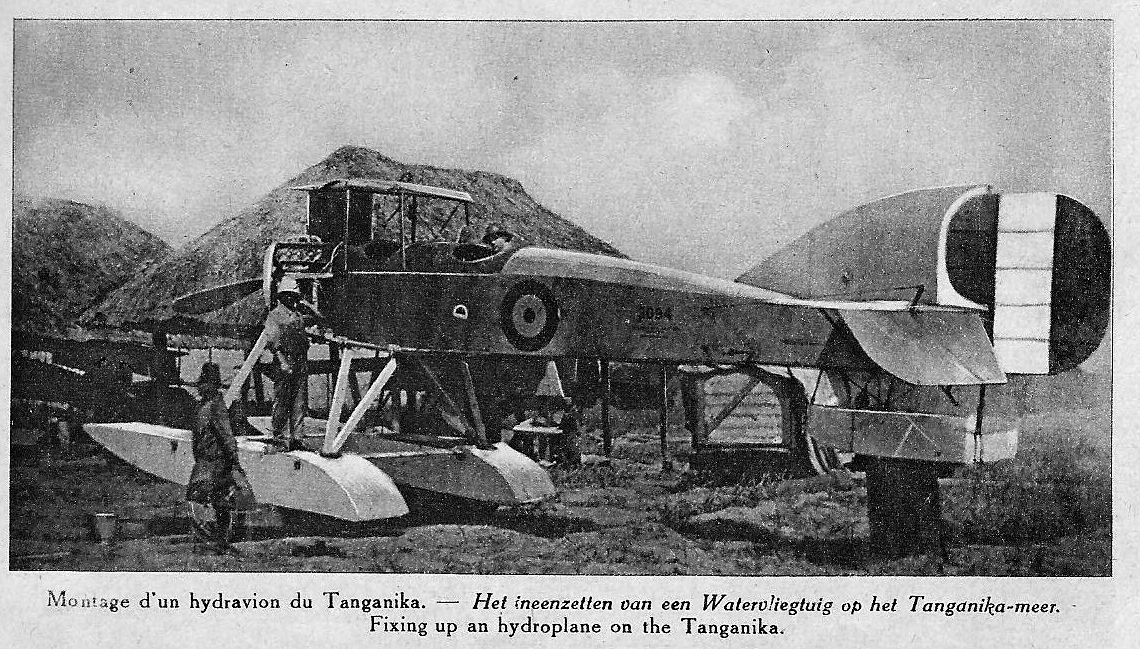
Reassembling a floatplane near the shores of Lake Tanganyika.

The Belgians mounted floatplanes on the lake giving them the ability to observe the German positions and to bomb them.

== Battle ==
=== Rosenthal investigates ===
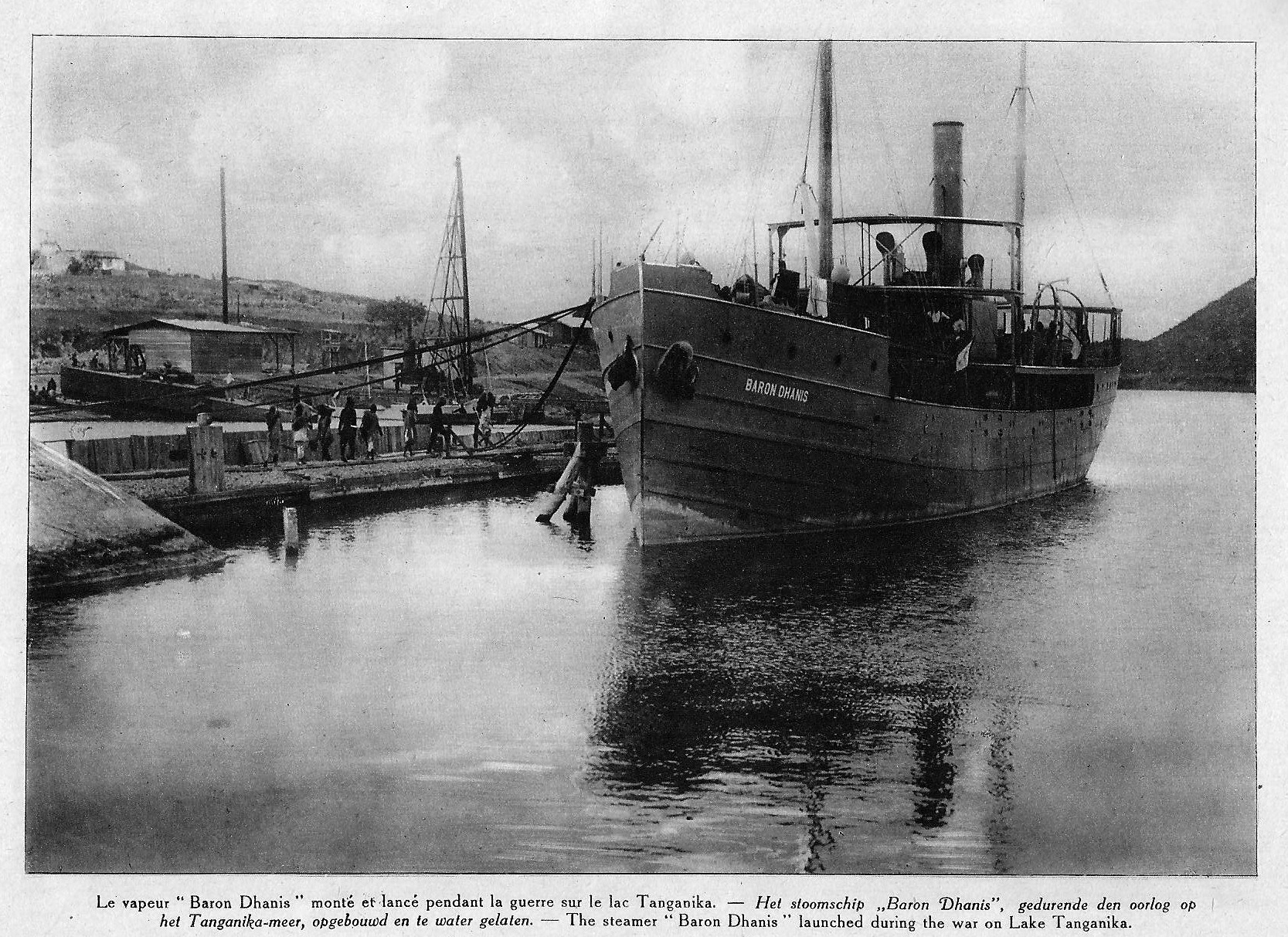
Baron Dhanis on the lake, c. 1916.

Lieutenant Job Rosenthal, commanding Kingani, made several passes and observed work underway on a new harbour at Kalemie, south of Lukuga, where Spicer-Simson intended to make his base. Still lacking detailed information on the enemy's movements, Kingani returned early on the morning of 1 December and attempted to approach the harbour. Rosenthal's vessel was spotted by the shore batteries and driven away, but returned the following night and Rosenthal himself swam to Lukuga to examine the slipways under construction. He also discovered the camps, where the British flag revealed the presence of Spicer-Simson and his expedition. Rosenthal travelled down the railway line and discovered both Mimi and Toutou, and the disassembled parts of Baron Dhanis. Realising that the threat actually lay in the British vessels, he attempted to return to Kingani, but was unable to locate her in the dark. He attempted to conceal himself and hoped that Kingani would return at nightfall, but was discovered by a Belgian patrol and taken prisoner. While a captive he succeeded in sending a message, with a secret addendum written in urine to Zimmer warning him of what he had seen, but the message did not reach Kigoma for several months.

=== Mimi and Toutou are launched ===
The slipways at Kalemie were ready by mid-December, and on 22 December Toutou was launched onto Lake Tanganyika, with Mimi following the next day. Final preparations were made on 24 December, including the fuelling and the fitting of guns, after which brief trials were made. On 26 December, Kingani approached Kalemie. Rosenthal's successor – Sub-Lieutenant Junge – had orders to gather information on naval preparations, and at 06:00 in the morning – as Spicer-Simson was conducting morning prayers – she was sighted offshore.

=== Kingani is captured ===
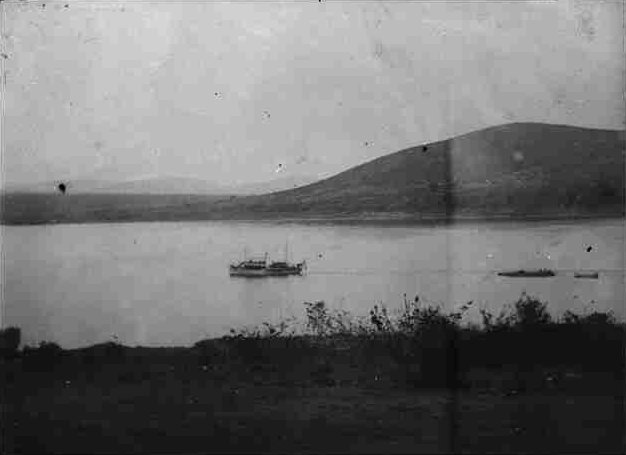
The Kingani on Lake Tanganyika before being captured.

Mimi and Toutou set out of the harbour after Kingani had passed by. Unexpectedly finding himself pursued by two motor boats flying the White Ensign, Junge ordered that the speed be increased. Kingani′s six-pounder gun could only fire forward, however, and the faster and more nimble motor boats were able to close the range and open fire with their three-pounder guns, while avoiding the German's fire. After a short action lasting 11 minutes, Kingani was hit on her gun, the shell passing through the gunshield and killing Junge and two petty officers, Penne and Schwarz. After several more hits, her chief engineer hauled down the colours and the British took possession of her. Junge and four dead crewmembers were buried; one African crewman was allowed to stay on Kingani as a stoker and three German and eight Africans were prisoners of war. After a hole in Kingani′s hull had been patched, she was taken into service as HMS Fifi. Spicer-Simson explained that Fifi meant "tweet-tweet" in French, and was suggested by the wife of a Belgian officer who had a small caged bird.

Her six-pounder gun was moved to her stern, while one of the 12-pounder guns that had been mounted ashore was fixed to the bows. The Admiralty were impressed by the expedition's achievements, Spicer-Simson was specially promoted to commander from the date of the action, and a message was sent which read "His Majesty The King desires to express his appreciation of the wonderful work carried out by his most remote expedition"; The Colonial Office also expressed its approbation. Zimmer did not immediately send Hedwig to investigate the disappearance of Kingani, possibly being too busy transporting troops and supplies. The storm season in January also made navigation of the lake dangerous for vessels smaller than Götzen.

=== Hedwig is sunk ===
It was not until mid-January that Hedwig came to Lukuga to investigate the disappearance of the German ship. By now, Spicer-Simson had been given the repaired Belgian vessel Delcommune—now renamed Vengeur—to add to his flotilla. Odebrecht scouted close to the shore, keeping clear of the shore batteries that were assumed to have sunk Kingani, but could not see anything worth reporting. He was ordered back to Lukuga on 8 February, and told to rendezvous with Zimmer on Götzen the following day. Hedwig was spotted early in the morning and the expedition's forces sallied forth to intercept her. The combined Anglo-Belgian flotilla consisted of Mimi, Fifi, Dix-Tonne, and the whaleboat, Toutou having been damaged and still under repair.^{[b]} Odebrecht spotted the approaching vessels, but continued to advance. He initially mistook them for Belgian craft, but the white ensigns revealed that they were British. He continued toward the shore until making a sharp turn to port at 09:30, either attempting to lure them toward Götzen, or having been fooled by an optical illusion into thinking the approaching vessels were larger than he had first thought. The pursuing vessels chased Hedwig, with Fifi opening fire with her bow-mounted 12-pounder. The recoil stopped her dead in her tracks; Odebrecht used this situation to pull away. Hedwig could do 9 knots (17 km/h; 10 mph) to Fifi′s 8 knots (15 km/h; 9.2 mph), but as Fifi fell behind, Mimi sped past, firing on the retreating German vessel with her three-pounder gun. The shots missed, but Hedwig′s stern guns did not have the range of Mimi′s weapon, and Odebrecht was forced to come about and try to hit her with his bow-mounted six-pounder. The two circled for a time, unable to score hits, until Fifi closed. Spicer-Simson, commanding aboard Fifi, was down to three shells on his 12-pounder, and risked being outclassed if Hedwig could bring her own six-pounder to bear. At this moment, a shell jammed in Fifi′s gun, and in the 20 minutes that it took to clear it, Hedwig again pulled away, searching for Götzen. With her second to last shot, Fifi fired again. The shell hit Hedwig′s hull, causing flooding, while moments later her last shell hit the engine room, bursting the boiler and killing five African sailors and two Germans. As fires began to spread through the stricken craft Odebrecht gave the order to abandon ship, and set explosive charges to destroy the sinking vessel. (Three of the dead were the engineer and two native stokers in the boiler room; the others were a warrant officer and three natives). Of the remaining ships company, a European stoker and native seaman were slightly wounded when two of the ships boats were hit by shells; Twelve Europeans, including the captain, and eight natives were captured by the British. Besides the 20 survivors the British also captured a large German naval ensign, the first to be taken in the war.

=== Götzen is scuttled ===
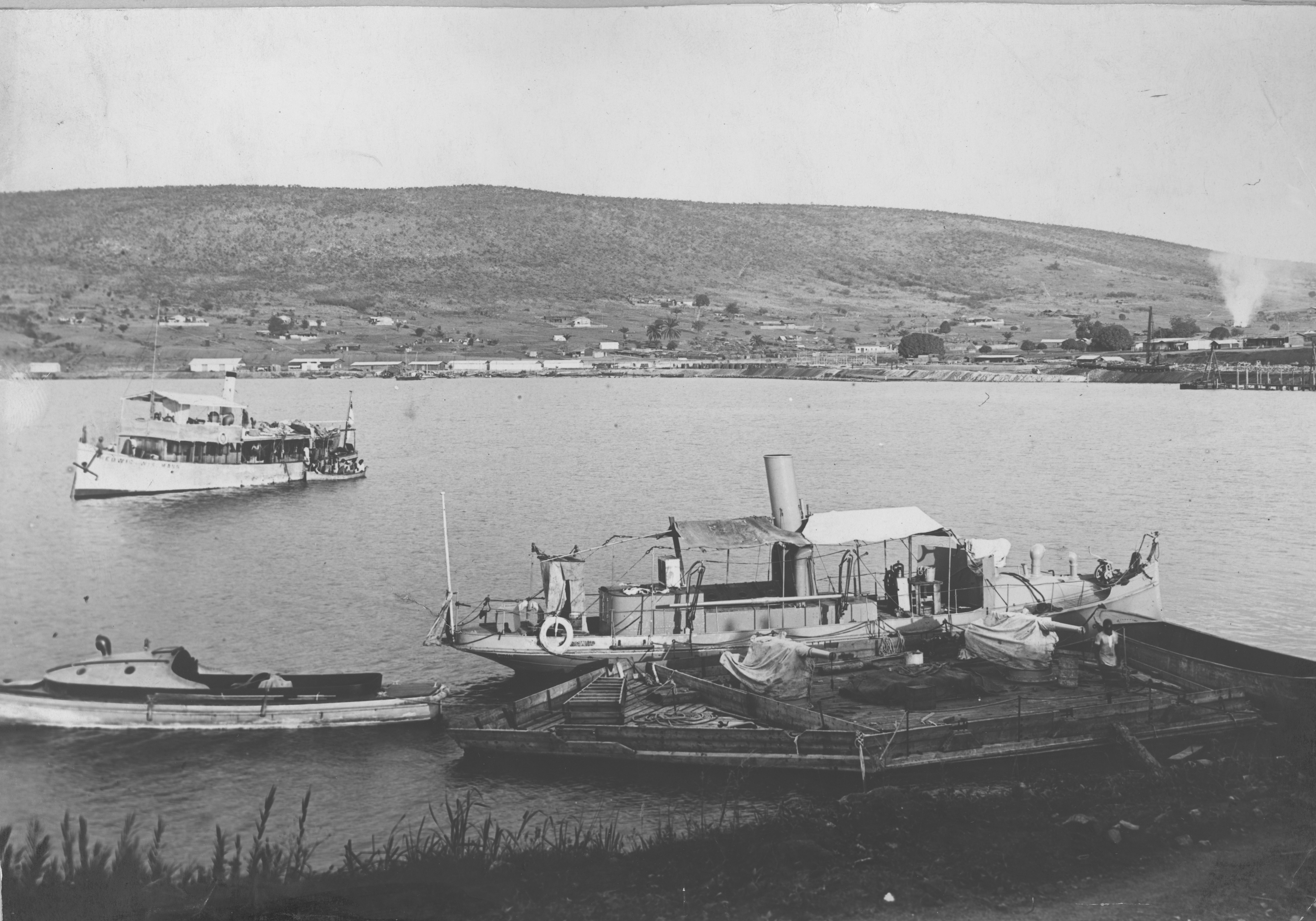
Port of Kigoma, c.1914-1916.

The flotilla returned to shore with their prisoners, and the following day Götzen appeared offshore, steaming slowly past in search of the missing Hedwig. Alerted, the crews rushed to man their boats, but Spicer-Simson forbade an attack. Shortly afterward, Spicer-Simson left the lake for Stanleyville, in search of a boat to rival Götzen. He found one such vessel—St George, a steel boat belonging to the British consul at Banana—and had her dismantled, dragged to Lake Tanganyika and reassembled. By the time he returned in May, the German position on the lake had deteriorated further. The Belgians were about to capture Kigoma and a British force was pushing north toward Bismarckburg. The expedition was to support land operations from the lake, and the flotilla, consisting of Mimi, Toutou, Fifi and Vengeur arrived off Bismarckburg on 5 June. Finding the harbour defended by a fort, Spicer-Simson decided not to attack, and withdrew to Kituta.

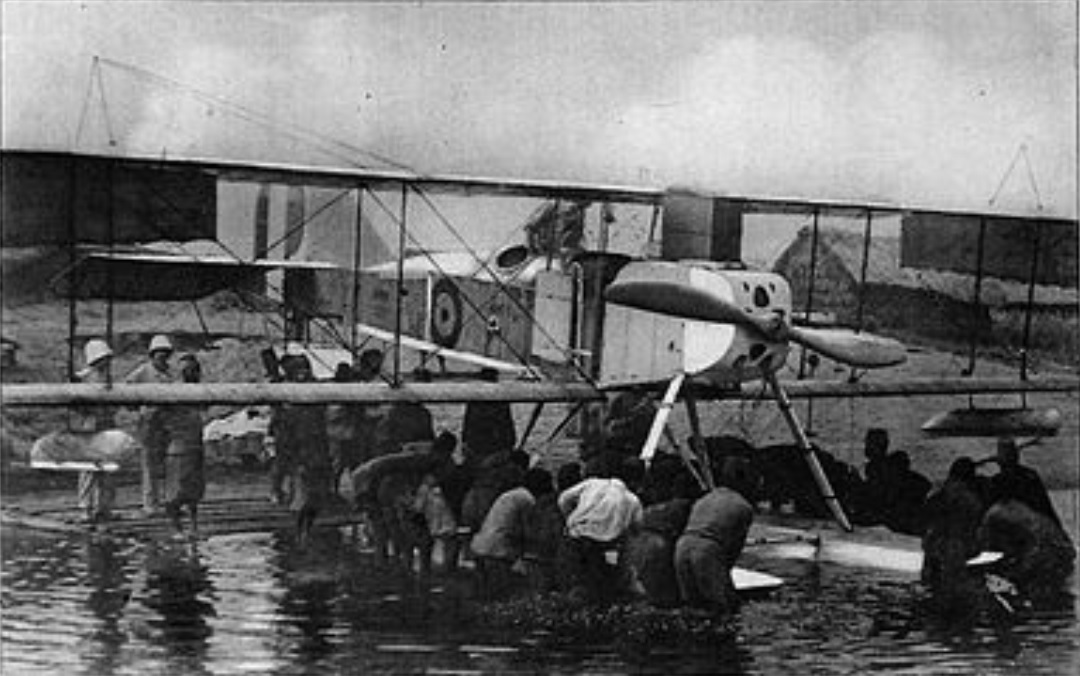
Towing a hydroplane afloat near the lake, c. 1916.

This allowed the German forces to escape in a fleet of dhows, an act which provoked the anger of the army commander, Lieutenant-Colonel Murray. The naval expeditionary force remained at Bismarckburg, where Spicer-Simson was chastened to learn that the fort's guns were in fact wooden dummies.

Meanwhile, the British had provided the Belgians with four Short Type 827 floatplanes to attack Götzen at Kigoma. Several bombing runs were made, but unbeknownst to either the British or the Belgians, Zimmer had been ordered by his commanding officer—Paul von Lettow-Vorbeck—to remove most of Götzen′s armament, including the 105 mm (4.1 in) autocannon taken from Königsberg, and send them to be used by the army in the field. Wooden dummies were mounted to maintain the illusion of a heavily armed ship. Kigoma fell to General Charles Tombeur′s forces on 28 July, during the Tabora Offensive, but Götzen was already gone. The Germans had sailed the ship to the south of Kigoma Bay and, after having her engines thoroughly greased in case there should be need to make use of her again, filled her with sand and carefully scuttled her on 26 July in a depth of 20 m near the banks of the Katabe Bay (Belgian designation: Baie de l’éléphant; British designation: Bangwe Bay) at the Position 04° 54' 05" S; 029° 36' 12" E.

== Aftermath ==
Anglo-Belgian control of Lake Tanganyika was secured by mid-1916, though the war in Africa dragged on for another two years. Most of the men of the naval expedition returned to Britain, where Spicer-Simson was awarded the Distinguished Service Order but was reprimanded for some of his antagonistic behaviour toward his Belgian allies and was not given another command. The Belgians for their part appointed him a Commander of the Order of the Crown, and awarded him the Croix de guerre. The exploits on Lake Tanganyika caught the public imagination, and were adapted by C. S. Forester for his book The African Queen, later made into the film The African Queen, directed by John Huston. A British naval force features in the book, consisting of two motor boats named HMS Amelia and HMS Matilda. The legacy of the Battle for Lake Tanganyika also continues in the survival of Spicer-Simson's nemesis, Graf von Götzen. She was raised by the Belgians and towed to Kigoma, but sank at her moorings in a storm. She was raised again by the British in 1921 under their mandate for Tanganyika, where it was found that she was so well preserved by the greasing, that little work needed to be done to repair her. She returned to service on 16 May 1927 under the name Liemba, and still sails Lake Tanganyika.

== Notes ==
a. Foden maintains throughout that the Admiralty were unaware of the existence of the Götzen, and that the expedition only became aware of her after their arrival on the lake shore. The presence of Kingani was also a surprise to them. Paice instead claims that Lee was aware of the Götzen from February, when structural work on her was nearing completion, and that he informed the Admiralty of her when he reported to them in April.
b. Paice records that Spicer-Simson had Mimi, Toutou, Fifi and 'a Belgian motor boat known only as Vedette'. Vedette is presumably the whaleboat with the outboard motor, identified by Foden as being termed by Commandant Goor as "la vedette (patrol boat)". Foden notes that Toutou had damaged her bows in a collision with the harbour wall, and had then sunk in a storm, before being recovered.
