= MV Liemba =

Ferry in lake Tanganyika, 1915–1916, 1927–present

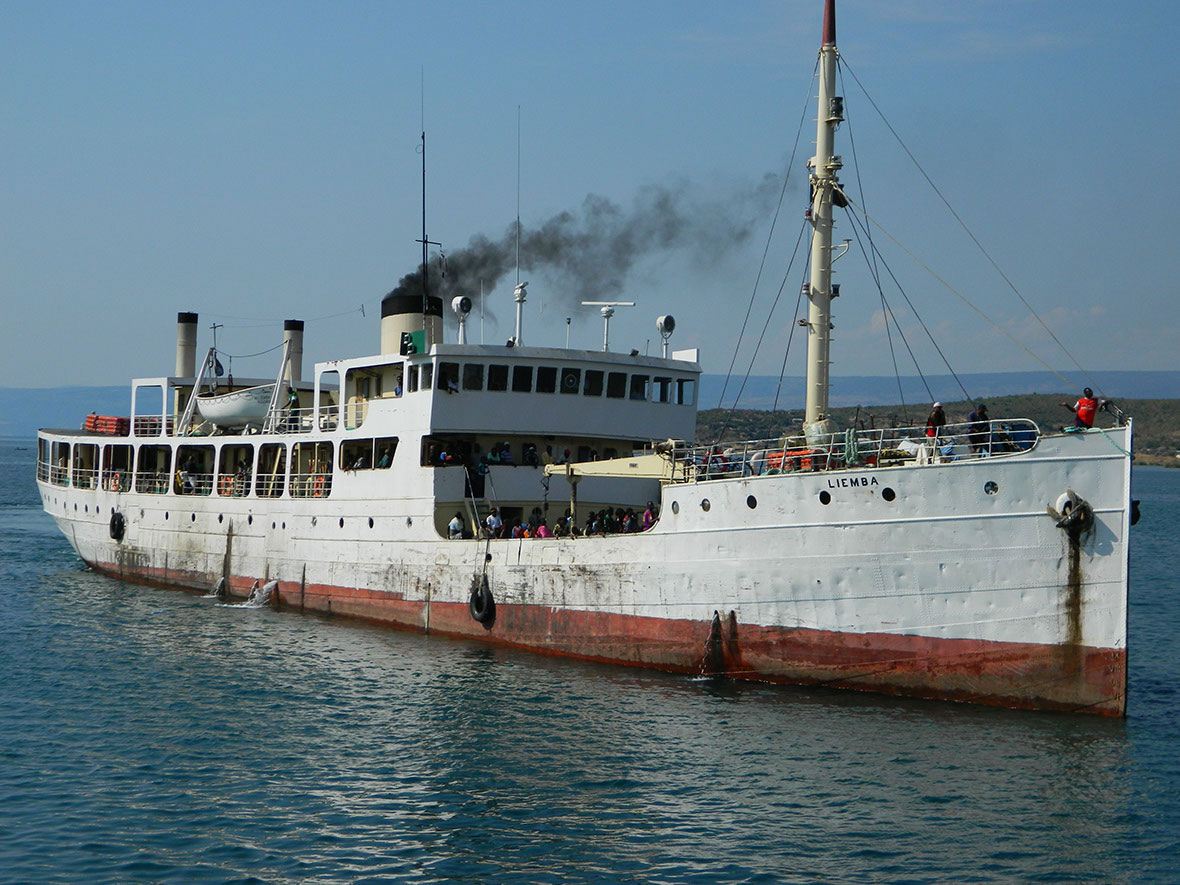
- MV Liemba

History

German Empire
- Name: Graf von Goetzen
- Namesake: Gustav Adolf von Götzen
- Builder: Meyer Werft
- Laid down: 1913
- Launched: 5 February 1915
- In service: 9 June 1915
- Fate: Scuttled on 26 July 1916

Tanganyika Territory
- Renamed: SS Liemba
- Reinstated: 16 May 1927

Tanzania
- Name: MV Liemba
- Operator: Marine Services Company
- Home port: Kigoma, Tanzania in active service

General characteristics
- Displacement: 1,575 t
- Length: 71.4 m (234.25 ft)
- Beam: 9.9 m (32.48 ft)
- Draught: 3 m (9.84 ft)
- Installed power: Steam 500 ihp (370 kW); Diesel 1,240 hp (920 kW)
- Propulsion: Triple-expansion steam engine, (until 1970, replaced with Diesel): 2 screws
- Speed: 11 knots (20 km/h)
- Armament: (removed 1916); 1 × 10.5 cm (4 in) gun; 1 × 8.8 cm (3 in) gun; 2 × 37 mm revolver guns

MV Liemba, formerly Graf Goetzen or Graf von Goetzen, (Note: Some sources use the alternative forms Graf Götzen or Graf Goetzen, or the short form Götzen or an equivalent. Sources using von in the name, e.g. Graf von Götzen, include Giles Foden's Mimi and Toutou Go Forth: The Bizarre Battle for Lake Tanganyika, Bryan Perrett's Gunboat! Small Ships at War, H. P. Willmott's The Last Century of Sea Power and Peter Shankland's The Phantom Flotilla, among others.) is a passenger and cargo ferry that runs along the eastern shore of Lake Tanganyika. The Marine Services Company of Tanzania sails her, with numerous stops to pick up and set down passengers, between the ports of Kigoma, Tanzania and Mpulungu, Zambia.

Graf von Goetzen was built in 1913 in Germany, and was one of three vessels the German Empire used to control Lake Tanganyika during the early part of the First World War. Her captain had her scuttled on 26 July 1916 in Katabe Bay during the German retreat from Kigoma. In 1924, a British Royal Navy salvage team raised her and in 1927 she returned to service as Liemba. Liemba is the last vessel of the German Imperial Navy still actively sailing anywhere in the world.

Liemba is believed to be the inspiration for the German gunboat Luisa in C. S. Forester's 1935 novel The African Queen, and John Huston's 1951 film version. The ship featured in the 1992 BBC Television travel series Pole to Pole. Indican Pictures and Breadbox Productions released a documentary on the ship in 2010, Liemba.

== History ==
=== Early history ===
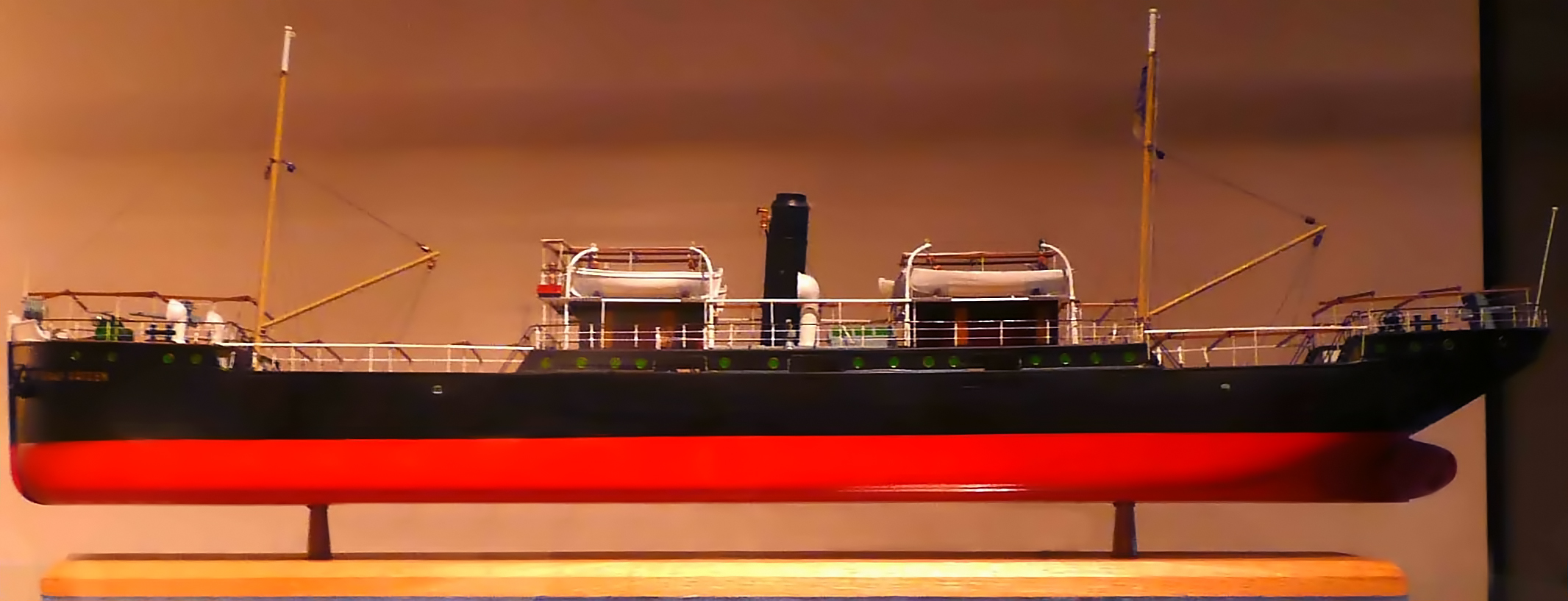
Model in Hamburg of Goetzen as originally built

The Meyer Werft shipyard in Papenburg, Germany, built Goetzen in 1913 and named her after Count Gustav Adolf Graf von Götzen, the former governor of German East Africa. Goetzen was designed to serve as a passenger and cargo ferry in conjunction with the Ostafrikanische Eisenbahngesellschaft (East African Railway Company).

After preliminary assembly Goetzen was taken apart and shipped in 5000 boxes loaded on three cargo vessels to Dar es Salaam in German East Africa (modern day Burundi, Rwanda and Tanganyika (the mainland part of present Tanzania)). From there the trains of the Mittellandbahn ("Central Line") carried the boxes to Kigoma. She was rebuilt there in 1914 and launched on 5 February 1915.

Originally the ship had seven first class cabins (single bed & sofa bed) and five second class cabins (double bed), as well as first and second class dining and smoking rooms.

The machinery consisted at first of two round boilers for steam for the two triple expansion engines with a power rating of 250 indicated horsepower (190 kW) per engine. She also had a carbonic ice and cooling unit in an insulated cold storage with a capacity of 3 kilograms (6.6 lb) of ice per hour, and a lighting and a ventilation system. The ship was designed for a crew of 64 men (60 men and four officers).

=== First World War ===
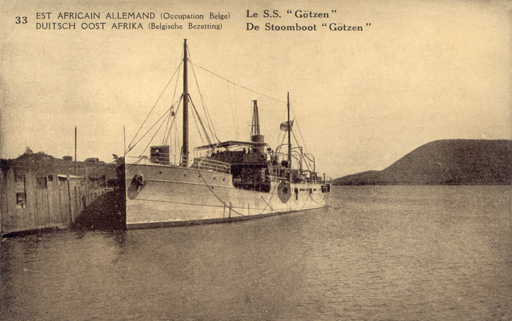
SS Goetzen 1915

During World War I the Germans converted Goetzen to an auxiliary warship under the name SMS Goetzen. They gave her a 10.5 cm (4 in) gun from the light cruiser SMS Königsberg, which had been scuttled as a result of the Battle of the Rufiji Delta. She also received an 8.8 cm (3 in) gun, one of two that Königsberg had brought out from Germany to arm auxiliary cruisers should the opportunity arise. Lastly, the survey ship SMS Möwe contributed two 37 mm Hotchkiss revolver guns to Goetzen's armament.

The Germans appointed Oberleutnant zur See Siebel captain of Goetzen. Under his command Goetzen initially gave the Germans complete supremacy on Lake Tanganyika. She ferried cargo and personnel across the lake between Kigoma and Bismarckburg (now Kasanga, Tanzania), saving troops from a two-week overland march, and provided a base from which to launch surprise attacks on Allied troops. It therefore became essential for the Allied forces to gain control of the lake themselves.

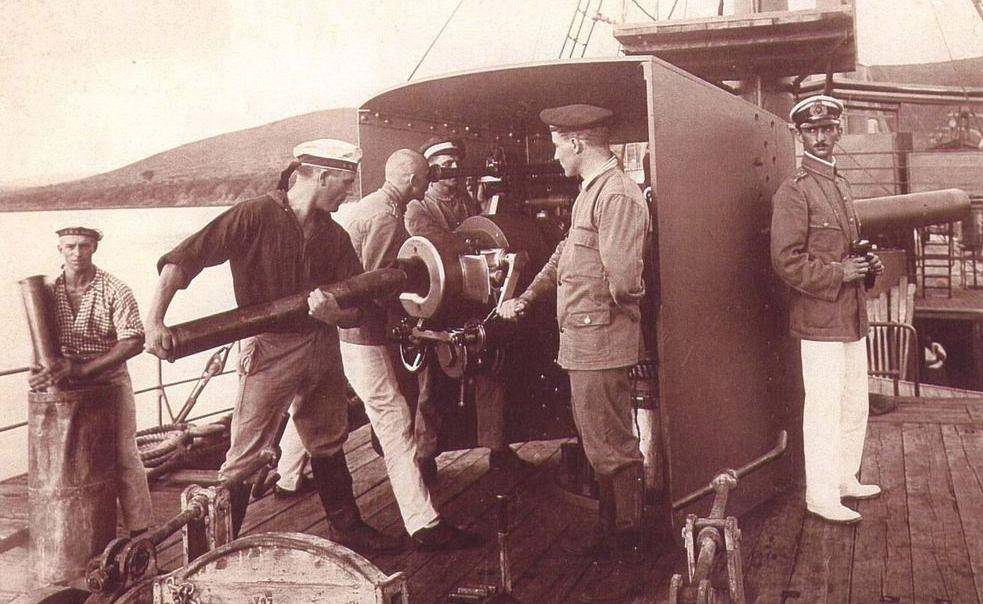
German gun crew manning Graf von Goetzen's 105 mm gun

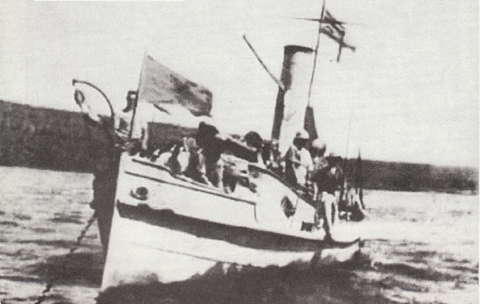
HMS Fifi formerly Kingani

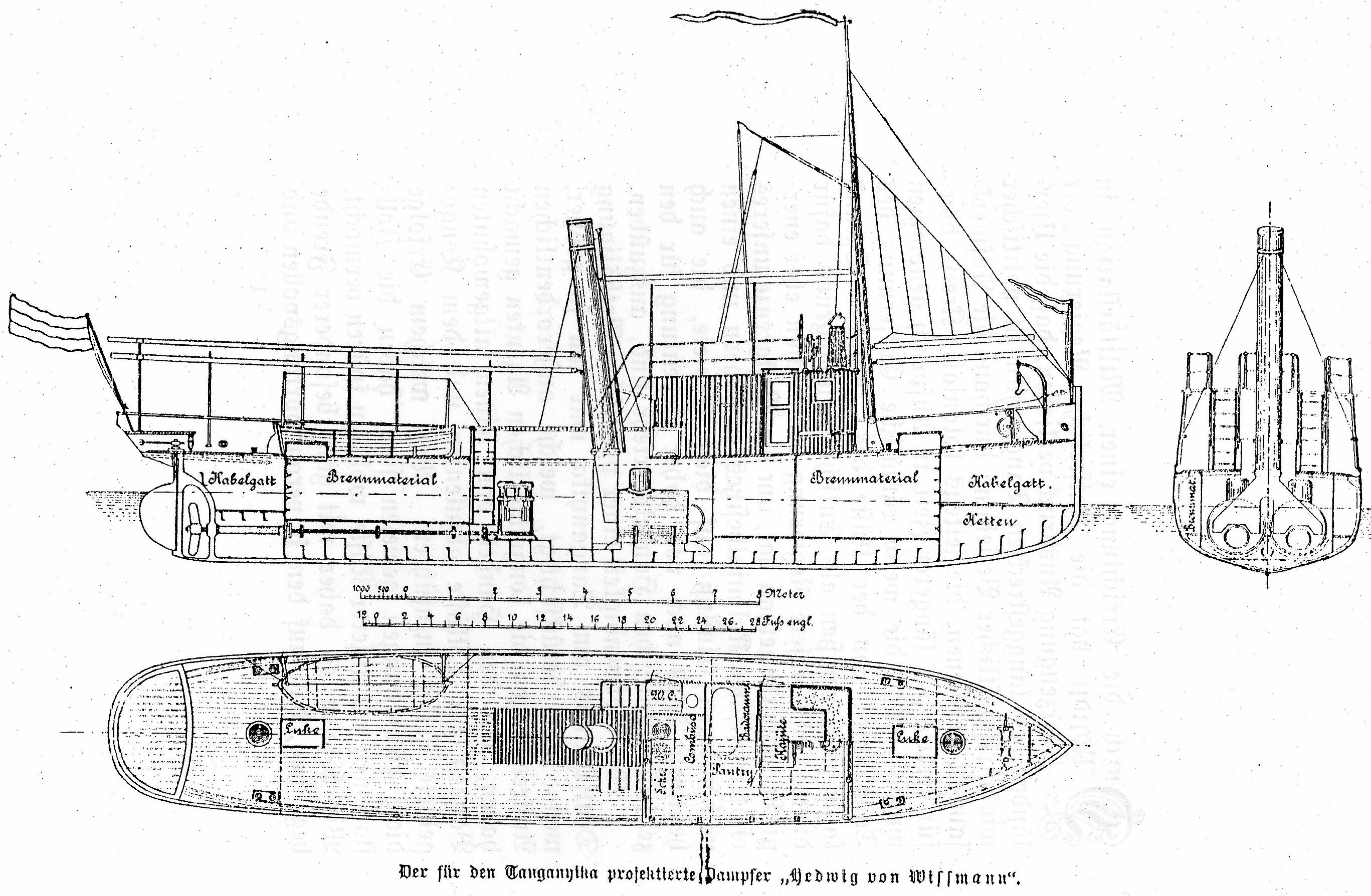
A diagram of Hedwig von Wissmann

Geoffrey Spicer-Simson and the Royal Navy succeeded in the monumental task of bringing two armed motor boats, Mimi and Toutou, from England and via the Belgian Congo to the lake by rail, road and river. The British then launched their two boats at Albertville (Kalemie) on the western shore of Lake Tanganyika. The two boats waited until December 1915, then mounted a surprise attack on the Germans, capturing the gunboat Kingani – renamed HMS Fifi. They sank a second German vessel, Hedwig von Wissmann, in February 1916; this left Götzen as the only German vessel remaining on the lake.

As a result of their strengthened position on the lake, the Allies advanced towards Kigoma by land, and the Belgians established an airbase on the western shore at Albertville. From there on 10 June 1916 they used Short Admiralty Type 827 planes for a bombing raid on Goetzen as she sat in the harbour of Kigoma. These bombing raids didn't severely damage the Goetzen, but she remained in the harbour. The Germans had already removed most of her guns in the beginning of May as they needed them elsewhere. At the time of the air raid Goetzen had only one 37 mm Hotchkiss left, which she used as an anti-aircraft gun.

The war on the lake had reached a stalemate by this stage, with both sides declining to mount attacks. However, the war on land was progressing, largely to the advantage of the Allies, who cut off the railway link in July 1916 and threatened to isolate Kigoma completely. This led the German naval commander on the lake, Gustav Zimmer, to abandon the town and head south. In order to avoid the ship falling into Allied hands, General Lettow-Vorbeck ordered that Goetzen be scuttled. The task was given to the three engineers from Meyer Werft who had travelled with the disassembled ship to Lake Tanganyika in order to supervise its re-assembly. The engineers decided on their own that they would try to facilitate a later salvage; they loaded the ship with sand and covered all engines with a thick layer of grease before sinking her carefully on 26 July, in a depth of 20 metres (66 ft) near the banks of the Katabe Bay (Belgian designation: Baie de l'éléphant; British designation: Bangwe Bay) at the position 4°54′5″S 29°36′12″E.

=== Salvage and recommissioning ===
Johann Ludwig Wall, a Swede working for the Belgians, salvaged the ship in 1918. He initially had divers remove large quantities of material. Then he filled the holds with empty barrels and passed cables under the ship to two 375 t barges that the "Compagnie des Chemins de fer du Congo Supérieur aux Grands Lacs Africains" had purpose-built for the task and positioned on each side of the wreck. By the end of June 1919, the Belgians had succeeded in lifting the ship up to her gunwales by winding in the cables. Then in mid-September the Belgians floated the semi-submerged vessel to Kigoma. There she settled in water 6–7 metres (20–23 ft) deep. The water was shallow enough that her superstructure extended above the surface of the lake. Early in 1920, a storm moved the vessel, sinking her at Point Lusana in 4°52′15″S 29°37′21″E. The photos of Kigoma Bay that Homer L. Shantz made in mid-February 1920 show no sign of the ship.

In 1921 the British took control of Kigoma. They then took until 16 March 1924 to raise the ship again. The British found that the engines and boilers were still usable and so they decided to rehabilitate the ship.

On 16 May 1927 the ship went back into service under the name Liemba. Mary Katherine Scott, the wife of the chief secretary and acting governor Sir John Scott, launched Liemba for the Tanganyika Railways and Port Service.

The pure conversion costs amounted to about £30,000 sterling. Salvage had cost £20,000, and infrastructure £28,000. The Germans had spent the equivalent of just £36,000 to construct her.

=== 1927 to 1948 ===
In 1941, following the death of Lord Baden-Powell on 7 January 1941, his widow, Olave, Lady Baden-Powell sailed in Liemba from Northern Rhodesia northwards.

=== 1948 to 1952 ===
Liemba returned to service in 1952 after a two-year break.

=== Since 1952 ===
Liemba was operating almost non-stop from 1927. In 1948 the East African Railways and Harbours Corporation (EAR&H) took over running the ferry, allowing it to link services with the Central Line from Kigoma to Dar es Salaam. From 1976 till 1979 the ship was overhauled. At this time twin diesel engines replaced the original steam engines. The driving force behind this renovation was Patrick "Paddy" Dougherty. He was born on 18 March 1918 in Downpatrick and did an apprenticeship at Harland & Wolff in Belfast. Subsequently, he served during the Second World War in the Royal Navy and became a ship's engineer. In the 1960s and 1970s, he worked for the EAR&H in Kisumu, Kenya as first engineer, and later as chief engineer on the ferries of Lake Victoria. After the renovation of Liemba he left Tanzania.

In 1977 the EAR&H was dissolved and the new Tanzania Railways Corporation (TRC) took over operation of Liemba. In 1993 the TRC gave Liemba an overhaul managed by the Danish shipyard OSK ShipTech A/S, sponsored by the Danish International Development Agency. The rebuild included the deck house, the electronic system, and the pipes, renovation of the cabins of the passengers and crew, new MAN engines of 460 kW (620 hp) each, installation of a hydraulic crane on the foredeck, and conversion of the rear cargo hull into a passenger room (capacity increase to 600 passengers).). To improve safety Liemba received a double bottom in the area of the forward cargo compartment. The ship was re-measured and the Danish engineers found that Liemba was 71.40 metres (234 ft 3 in) long and had a beam of 10 metres (32 ft 10 in). With the new machinery, the ship can achieve a speed of 11 knots (20 km/h; 13 mph). Liemba now has ten first-class passenger cabins (double bed) and two VIP cabins. Eighteen second-class cabins (six double and twelve quad-beds) are also available.

In 1997 TRC's inland shipping division became a separate company, the Marine Services Company Ltd.

In 1997 the United Nations High Commissioner for Refugees used Liemba and MV Mwongozo to repatriate more than 75,000 refugees who had fled Zaire during the First Congo War, following the overthrow of longtime dictator Mobutu Sese Seko. Liemba made a total of 22 trips between Kigoma and Uvira during this five month operation. In May 2015 she was hired by the United Nations to evacuate 50,000 refugees fleeing from the troubles in Burundi.

In 2014, the BBC showed a film about the ship, as part of their series on "World War One: Beyond the Trenches".

=== Renovation or replacement? ===
In 2011, TRC wrote to the Federal Government of Germany, requesting assistance in either renovating or replacing the vessel. The German authorities undertook a study that it is thought concluded that it would be cheaper to build a new ship than renovate Liemba. The final request for financial help fell between the governments of Lower Saxony, where the ship was built, and the federal government in Berlin, with the then President of Germany Christian Wulff stating that the vessel had a "singular history" and performed an "indispensable service" to the people of East Africa. The Liemba was in 2017 in Kigoma for a major maintenance. It is sailing again since 9 August 2018.

Renovation by the Croatian Brodosplit shipyard began in 2024. The ship began trials in mid August 2026.

== The African Queen ==
The original version of The African Queen, written by C. S. Forester and serialised in the News Chronicle in 1934, was very different from the one associated with the film. In this Rose and Allnut are planning to attack a German cruiser named Dortmund (loosely based on SMS Königsberg), with the launch sailing down the river to attack it in the river delta.

In the book the German gunboat Königin Luise (referred to by hero Charlie Allnutt as Louisa) is based on Kingani, a German gunboat sunk on Lake Tanganyika and to a certain extent the events portrayed in the film are based on the dramatic naval operation carried out by the Royal Navy, but the events described in the book bear little resemblance to the true historical events.

The book was subsequently made into the 1951 classic film The African Queen, starring Humphrey Bogart and Katharine Hepburn. The steam-tug Buganda on Lake Victoria, which was used for the long shots, played the gunboat used in the filming. The film brought a certain notoriety to Goetzen or Liemba.

== Ferry operation ==
Liemba has been running once a week in each direction again since August 2018, from Kigoma to Mpulungu Wednesday to Friday, and back again from Friday to Sunday. Accommodation ranges from 1st class (luxury cabin) to 3rd class (seating only).

There are docks at Kigoma, Mpulungu and Kasanga but at all other stops passengers must travel between ship and shore by way of a smaller boat. Notable stops along the route include: Lagosa (for Mahale Mountains National Park), Karema (for Mpanda) and Kipili or Kasanga (for Sumbawanga).

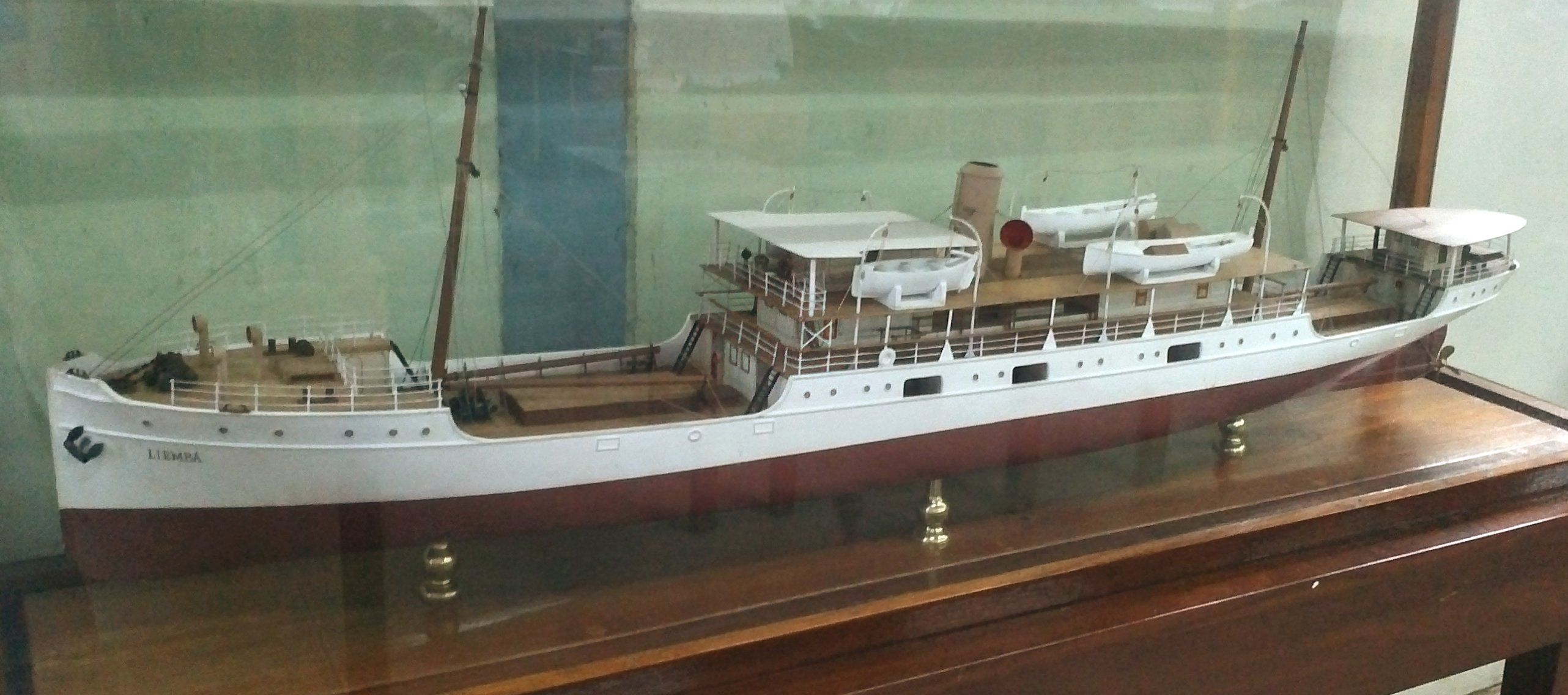
Model of MV Liemba in the Railway Museum, Nairobi (Kenya)

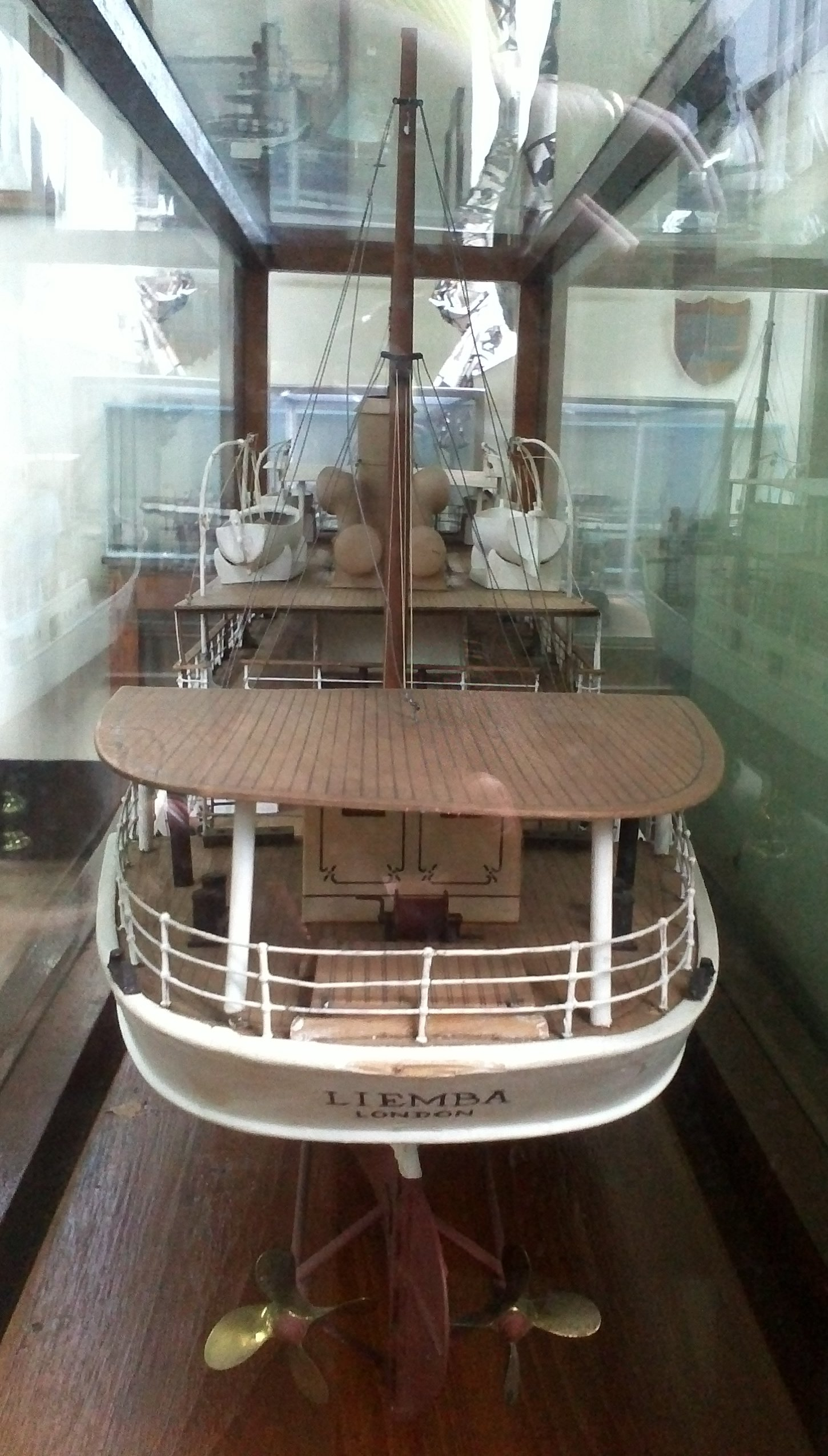
Model of MV Liemba, stern view

== Engines ==
Originally, the Goetzen/Liemba had two steam engines. The boilers were fuelled with wood or coal. In 1952, the ship was fitted with new oil-fuelled boilers. In 1978, the Liemba was equipped with Caterpillar diesel engines (400 hp each) for the first time. In 1993, she was fitted with two new diesel engines (MAN B & W Alpha Diesel type 5L23/30). The engines originally had an output power of 650 kW each at 825 rpm. To protect the ship's propellers and at the same time to adapt to the conditions on Lake Tanganyika, the engines were throttled back to an output of 460 kW (625 hp) each. With the new installed engine power, the ship reached a service speed of 11 knots.

== Bibliography ==
- Paulus, Sarah; Wackenberg, Rolf G. (2013). Von Goetzen bis Liemba. Auf Reisen mit einem Jahrhundertschiff (in German). Artissage. ISBN 978-3-00-042050-4.
- Lonely Planet: East Africa. Lonely Planet Publications.
- Patience, Kevin (2006). Shipwrecks & Salvage on the East African Coast. Kevin Patience. ASIN B000V9QW7K.
- Paulus, Sarah (3 December 2011). "Facts and Figures on MV Liemba previously SMS Graf GOETZEN". Sarah Paulus.
