= Hermann Wissmann =

German explorer

Hermann von Wissmann
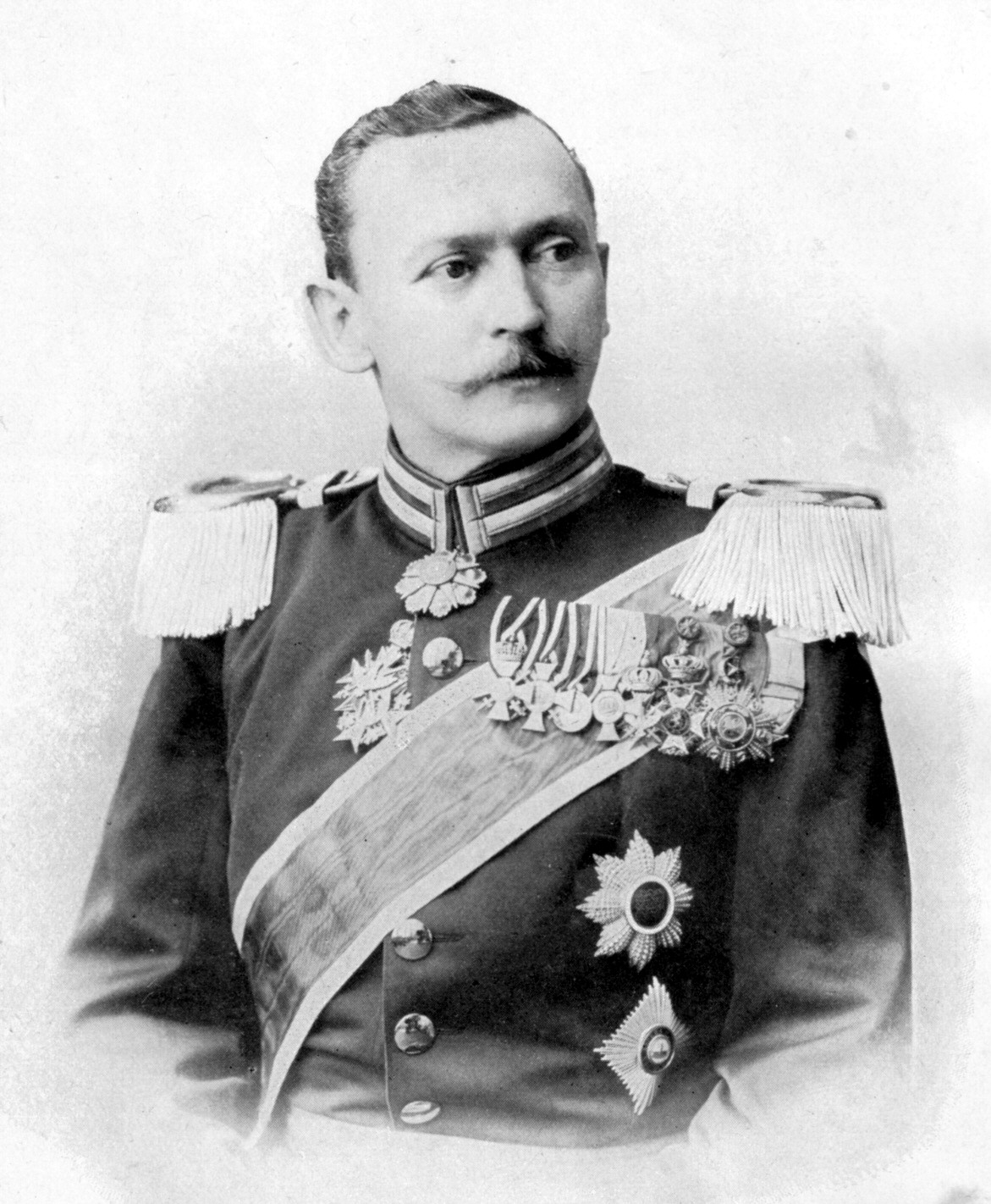

4th Reichskommissar of German East Africa
- In office 25 April 1895 – 4 December 1896
- Preceded by: Friedrich von Schele
- Succeeded by: Eduard von Liebert

Personal details
- Born: 4 September 1853 Frankfurt an der Oder, Kingdom of Prussia
- Died: 15 June 1905 (aged 51) Weißenbach, Austria-Hungary
- Children: Hermann von Wissmann
- Nickname: Deutschlands größter Afrikaner

Military service
- Allegiance: German Empire
- Branch/service: Prussian Army
- Years of service: 1870–1896
- Rank: Colonel
- Battles/wars: Franco-Prussian War; German colonization of Africa

Hermann Wilhelm Leopold Ludwig Wissmann, after 1890 Hermann von Wissmann (4 September 1853 – 15 June 1905), was a German military officer, colonial explorer and served as an administrator for King Leopold II of Belgium. He later served the Prussian empire and its African colonies.

== Biography ==
Born in Frankfurt an der Oder, the son of a government official, Wissmann chose a military career. He attended cadet school in Berlin and was enlisted in the Prussian Army in 1870, joined the 90th Fusiliers in 1871, and was commissioned a Lieutenant four years later. Wissmann served Mecklenburg in Füsilierregiment No. 90 posted at Rostock. During this time he had to serve a four-month prison sentence for wounding an opponent in a duel. An 1879 chance meeting at with the explorer Dr. Paul Pogge changed his life.

Granted a leave of absence from the army, in 1880, Wissmann accompanied explorer Paul Pogge on a journey through the Congo Basin. In the eastern Congo, Pogge and Wissmann parted company. Pogge stayed to build an agricultural research station for a Congolese chief, while Wissmann trekked to the Indian Ocean via present-day Tanzania. He was awarded the 1888 Founder's Medal of the Royal Geographical Society for his explorations. Afterwards Wissmann was in the employ of King Leopold II of Belgium, who was in the process of creating his personal African empire, known as the Congo Free State.

In March 1883 Wissmann gave the name "Zappo Zap" to a Songye leader known as Nsapu Nsapu who ruled over the town of Mpengie, part of the Ben'Eki kingdom in the eastern Kasai region. This was a settlement with more than a thousand people, many of them slave warriors, to the east of the Sankuru River between Kabinda and Lusambo. Zappo Zap's people became allies and auxiliaries of the Congo Free State authorities. In 1899 they were sent out by the colonial administration to collect taxes. They massacred many villagers, causing an international outcry.

When in 1888 the attempts of the German East Africa Company to start a dominion collapsed in face of African resistance, it asked Bismarck for help, which was at first refused. In 1888, Wissmann was promoted to captain and appointed 1st official Reichskommissar (8 February 1888 to 21 February 1891) for the German East Africa region where he was tasked with suppression of the Abushiri Revolt led by Abushiri ibn Salim al-Harthi. Wissmann was only given one order: "Victory".

On his way to East Africa Wissmann hired a mercenary force of mostly Sudanese soldiers from decommissioned units of the Anglo-Egyptian army to whom later a number of Zulus from South Africa were added, all under the command of German officers. The German forces, along with British naval assistance, fortified Bagamoyo, Dar es Salaam and retook Tanga and Pangani. Wissmann's forces with superior firepower also retook the rest of the Coastal Strip. They fortified the interior garrison of Mpwapwa and reopened the main caravan route through the area, using Lts. Langheld, Sigle, Charles Stokes & Sergeant Bauer. Soon afterwards, Abushiri was arrested and executed in Pangani on 16 December 1889. In January 1890, Wissmann issued a general pardon to the remaining rebels.

Wissmann's forces used extremely brutal methods borrowed from the Congo to suppress resistance. Massacres were carried out with the new Maxim gun, which fired at around 500 rounds per minute. Wissmann also plundered towns and burned fields. Anyone who refused to submit themselves to his forces was killed. Prisoners were used for slave labor and sexual slavery.

Wissmann was promoted to major in 1890 and given a hero's welcome on his return to Germany. In 1891 he was named commissioner for the western region of German East Africa and became Reichskommissar in 1895. In the same year his son, Hermann, was born. Ill health forced him to resign from the army return to Germany in 1896, where he authored several books and lectured throughout Germany.

Wissmann died in a hunting accident on 15 June 1905, after accidentally shooting himself with his own rifle.

== Legacy ==
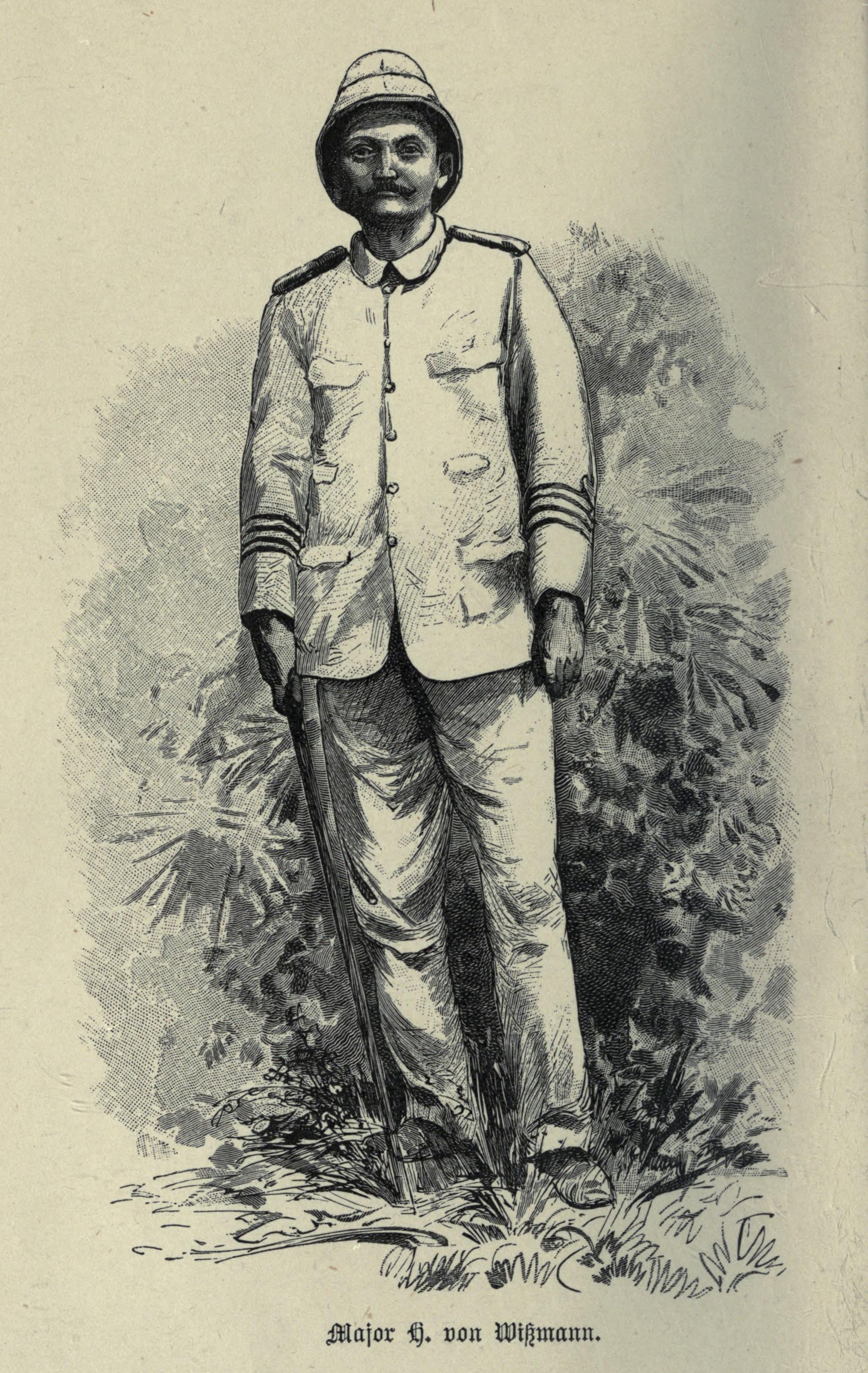
Major Hermann Wissmann, from an 1891 illustration by Rudolf Hellgrewe

Though he was highly esteemed by his officers and non-commissioned officers, he came under heavy criticism from some German diplomatic and military observers. He was harshly attacked for burning villages and laying waste to agricultural fields, executing great numbers of natives and tolerating no opposition. For the German General-Consul at Zanzibar Michelies he was a military dictator. Rear Admiral Karl August Deinhard of the German East African naval detachment charged him with arrogance, tactlessness, being undiplomatic, and lack of organizing or administrative skills.

The term "Wissmanntruppe" was used for the military and police units under Wissmann's command. They formed the core of the later Schutztruppe which came into life after the German government took over East Africa from the failed company.

In 1890 a single-screw steamship christened SMS Hermann von Wissmann was built by the Hamburg Janssen and Schilinsky shipyard. It was built in sections in Germany shipped to East Africa, transported overland and launched in Lake Nyasa in September 1893. It was captured at Liuli by the British in the first naval action of World War I. A similar but smaller version christened the SMS Hedwig von Wissmann after Hermann's wife was launched on Lake Tanganyika in September 1900. In 1916 she was sunk in a battle with HMS Mimi and HMS Toutou.

The Wissmann Monument in Dar es Salaam was removed by the British. Its statue is now in Hamburg.

== Bibliography ==
- Im Innern Afrikas [In Africa's Interior] (3rd ed.). Leipzig: Brockhaus. 1891.
- Unter deutscher Flagge quer durch Afrika von West nach Ost 1880-83 [Across Africa under a German flag from West to East 1880-83] (7th ed.). Walther & Apolant. 1890.
- Meine zweite Durchquerung Äquatorial-Afrikas vom Kongo zum Zambesi während der Jahre 1886 und 1887 [My second crossing of Equatorial Africa from the Congo to the Zambezi during the years 1886 and 1887]. Berlin: Globus Verlag. 1890.
- Afrika: Schilderungen und Ratschläge zur Vorbereitung für den Aufenthalt und Dienst in den deutschen Schutzgebieten [Africa: Description and advice for preparation and service in the German territories]. E. S. Mittler. 1903.
