= Kasanga =

- Location in Tanzania
- Coordinates: 8°27′30″S 31°8′10″E
- Country: Tanzania
- Region: Rukwa
- Time zone: UTC+3 (East Africa Time)

Kasanga, known as Bismarckburg during the German colonial rule, is a town in Rukwa Region, Tanzania. It is located at around 8°27′30″S 31°8′10″E, on the shore of Lake Tanganyika, 810 m above sea level.

== History ==
A research station (Forschungsstation), the ruins of which are still visible, was founded in 1888 during the German colonial period by the explorer Ludwig Wolf and the German East Africa Company. The settlement was named after Otto von Bismarck. In 1893 Anton Reichenow published Die Vogelfauna Der Umgegend von Bismarckburg (The Birdfauna of the Bismarckburg region) in Berlin, an important source of information about birdlife in the area for this period. The research station's charter was repealed in 1894 during administrative reforms and the German colonial regime set up a first rate education system in the area. According to the 1920 Deutsches Kolonial-Lexikon the town was for a long time the seat of the regional military district (the Militärbezirk). On 1 April 1913 it became the seat of the district office (Bezirksamts). The city's small port (now known as Kala) was formerly known as Wissmannhafen (German: Wißmannhafen) after Hermann von Wissmann, the colony's first commissioner and governor; it serviced small steamers on Lake Tanganyika. There were approximately 3900 inhabitants by 1913.

Over 1914-1915 the town was the site of a minor incident in the East African Campaign (World War I). In September 1914 a small German military unit had sallied across the border into British Northern Rhodesia and attacked Abercorn. A British flotilla, consisting of the Mimi, Toutou, HMS Fifi and Vengeur was organised on Lake Tanganyika to support the land forces of the British army marching north from Northern Rhodesia in May. On 5 June 1915 the flotilla arrived off Bismarckburg. Finding the harbour defended by a German fort, Lieutenant-Commander Geoffrey Spicer-Simson decided not to attack, and withdrew to Kituta. This allowed the German Imperial Army (the Reichsheer) to escape in a fleet of dhows, an act that provoked the anger of the army commander, Lieutenant-Colonel Murray. The British army and the naval expeditionary force entered Bismarckburg on 8 June, where Spicer-Simson was chastened to learn that the fort's guns were in fact wooden dummies. In 1918 the German General Paul Emil von Lettow-Vorbeck and his remarkable Schutztruppe army of Askaris surrendered nearby at Abercorn.

After 1920 the British Mandate regime of Tanganyika Territory dropped the German name of the town and changed it to Kasanga. In 2008 a major investment revamp of the harbour facilities was announced, with the hope of cashing in on trade opportunities with neighbouring Congo and Zambia.

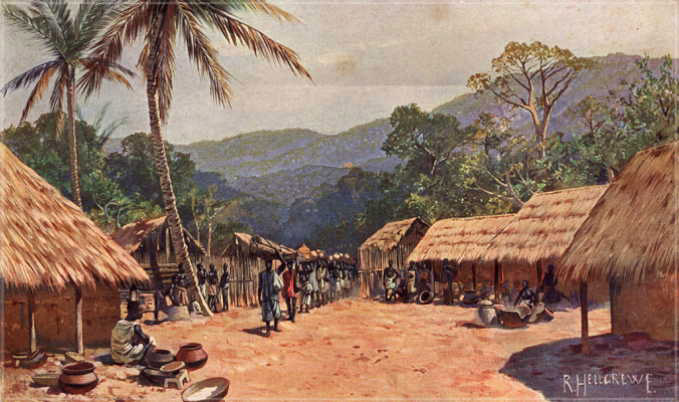
Village near Bismarckburg (German East Africa) during colonial times (painting by Rudolf Hellgrewe)

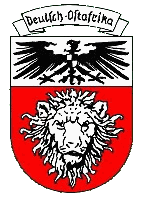
Coat of arms of German East Africa

== Transport ==
In 2014, a railway branch line to Kasanga was proposed. This line would connect with the intention to connect with the Tanzam line giving access to Dar es Salaam.

== Literature ==
- Heinrich Schnee, Deutsches Koloniallexikon, Bd. 1 - 3, Leipzig 1920.
- Meyers Enzyklopädisches Lexikon.
- Der große Weltatlas, Kartographisches Institut Bertelsmann, Gütersloh 1963.
- Kiester, Edwin, An Incomplete History of World War I, (Murdoch Books, 2007) ISBN 1-74045-970-9.
- Foden, Giles, Mimi and Toutou Go Forth: The Bizarre Battle for Lake Tanganyika (Penguin, 2005), ISBN 0-141-00984-5.

== See also ==
- Railway stations in Tanzania
