= MV Mwongozo =

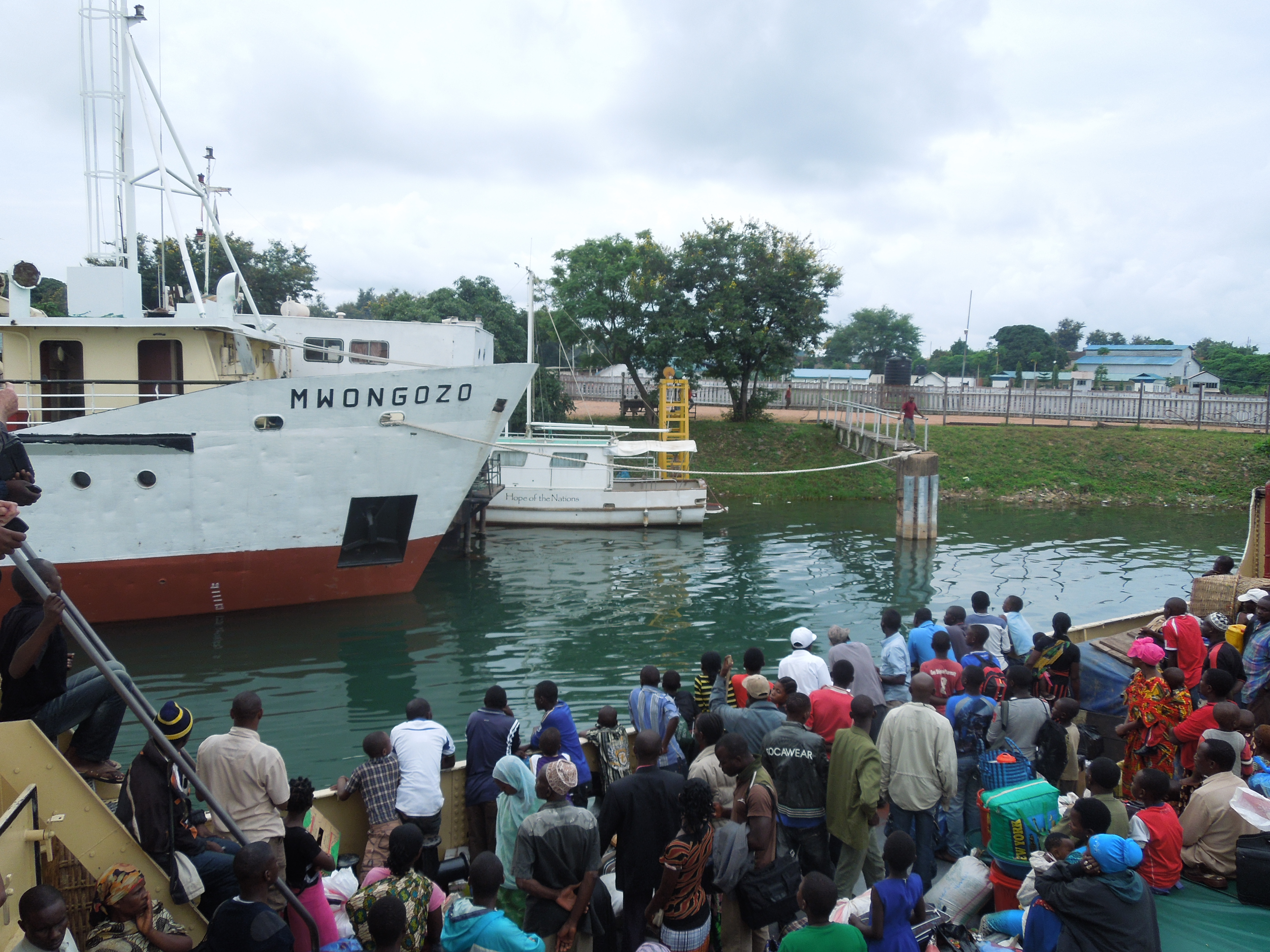
- MV Mwongozo anchored at Kigoma Port

History

Tanzania
- Name: MV Mwongozo
- Operator: Marine Services Company
- Launched: 1979
- Completed: 1982
- In service: 1982 onwards
- Home port: Kigoma, Tanzania
- Identification: IMO number: 7636523

General characteristics
- Type: Ferry
- Tonnage: 850 GRT
- Length: 59.5 m (195 ft)
- Beam: 9.6 m (31 ft)
- Draught: 2.5 m (8 ft 2 in)
- Propulsion: diesel
- Capacity: 800 passengers; 80 tons cargo

MV Mwongozo is a mixed passenger and cargo ferry on Lake Tanganyika operated by the Marine Services Company. She can carry up to 800 passengers and 80 tons of cargo. Her accommodation includes open sleeping areas, individual cabins and a passenger dining saloon. She can take cars and small trucks on her forward deck.

Mwongozo normally plies a daily route between Kigoma and Bujumbura. The journey takes about 14 hours. MSC's other Lake Tanganyika ferry, MV Liemba, operates the route to Zambia.

== History ==
Mwongozo was built by a Finnish company for the Tanzania Railways Corporation. Her original route was a weekly return route from Bujumbura, Burundi to Mpulungu, Zambia, calling at Kigoma, Tanzania and various small settlements along the Tanzanian coast of the lake.

In 1997 the UNHCR used Mwongozo and Liemba to transport more than 75,000 refugees, who had fled Zaire during the First Congo War, back to their homeland following the overthrow of longtime dictator Mobutu Sese Seko.

Also in 1997, TRC's inland shipping division became a separate company, the Marine Services Company Ltd.

Regional instabilities during the early 2000s lead to an increase of piracy on Lake Tanganyika. In 2001 and 2002 Mwongozo was attacked twice by pirates resulting in thousands of dollars of loss to passengers and substantial damage to the hull, requiring extensive repairs. Service between Kigoma and Bujumbura was suspended for a year after the second attack.

== See also ==
- Transport in Tanzania
