= Hedwig von Wissmann (steamship) =

German steamship in Africa in early 20th century

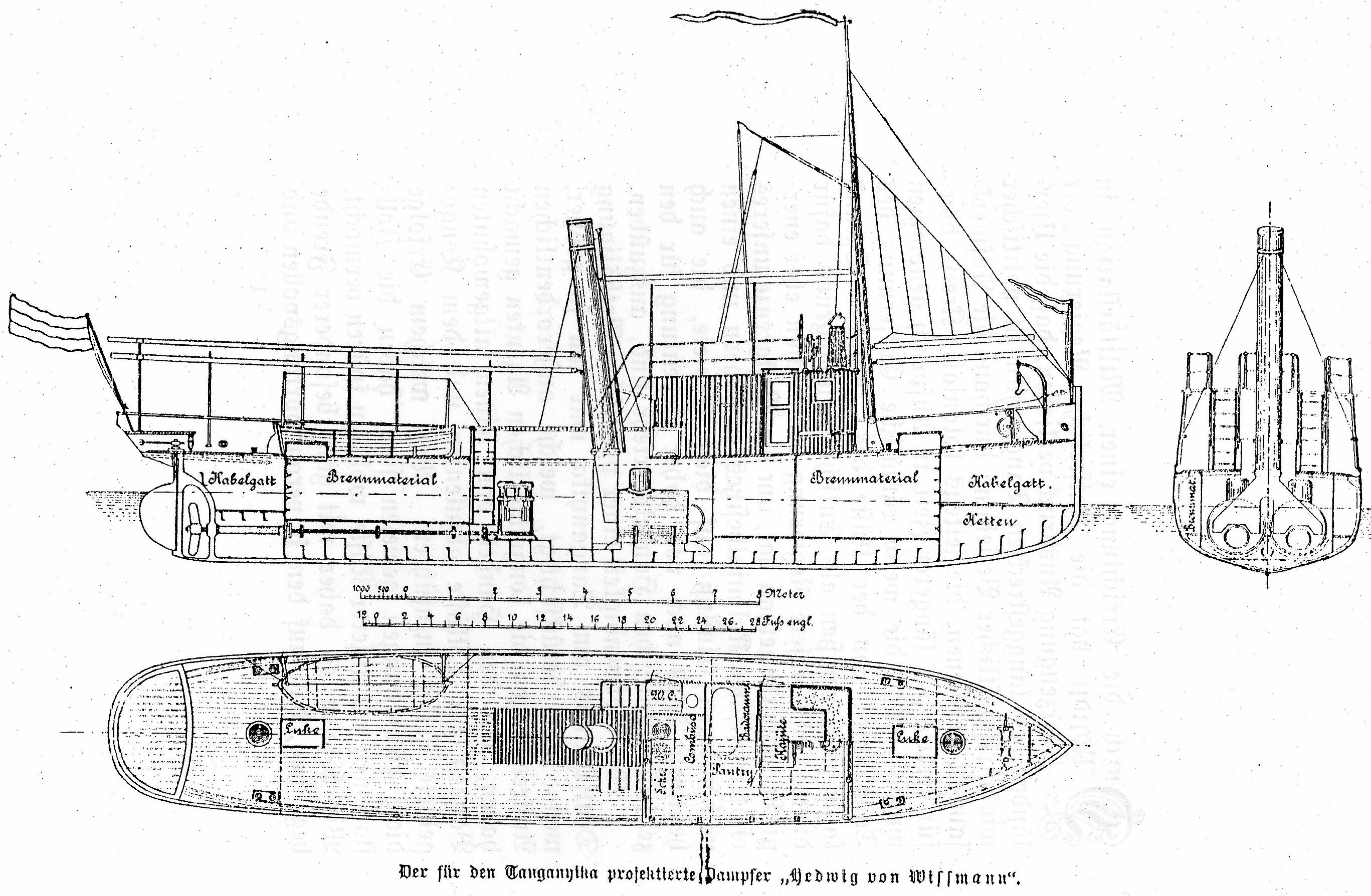
- Plans of Hedwig von Wissmann

History

German Empire
- Name: Hedwig von Wissmann
- Builder: Janssen & Schmilinsky, Hamburg
- Launched: 1897, 6 November 1900
- In service: 20 September 1900
- Fate: Sunk, 9 February 1916

General characteristics
- Type: Steamship
- Displacement: 60 t (59 long tons)
- Length: 20 m (65 ft 7 in)
- Beam: 4.26 m (14 ft 0 in)
- Height: 2.3 m (7 ft 7 in)
- Draught: 1.25 m (4 ft 1 in)
- Propulsion: Steam engine, 85 PS (63 kW)
- Speed: 9 knots (17 km/h; 10 mph)
- Capacity: 400
- Crew: 14 + 14
- Armament: 3 × 3.7 cm (1.5 in) Hotchkiss revolving cannons; From April 1915: 1 × 4.7 cm (1.9 in) quick-loading gun; 1 × 3.7 cm revolving cannon

Hedwig von Wissmann was a German steamboat on Lake Tanganyika, which became a feature in the story behind the film The African Queen. She was sister vessel to the larger Hermann von Wissmann on Lake Nyasa, and like that vessel originally used as a gunboat against slavers. The ship was named for Hedwig von Wissmann, the wife of the German explorer and colonial administrator Hermann von Wissmann who had raised funds for both boats.

On 12 August 1914 the vessel was drafted for guard service on Lake Tanganyika. She was sunk by an Anglo-Belgian flotilla of small boats under Geoffrey Spicer-Simson on 9 February 1916 at 11h50 in the Battle for Lake Tanganyika including HMS Fifi and HMS Mimi.

German casualties were an engineer and two African stokers killed in the engine room; a warrant officer and some African crew members killed and a European stoker and an African seaman slightly wounded when two of the ships boats were hit by shells. Twelve Europeans, including the captain Job Odebrecht, and eight Africans were captured by the British.
