= HMS Fifi =

1894 screw steamer

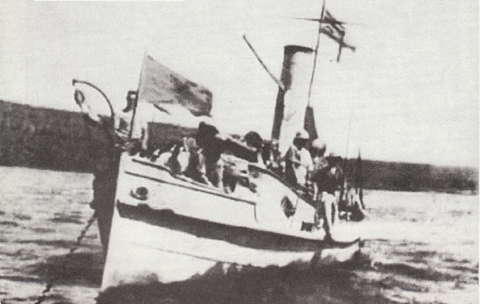
- HMS Fifi

History

German Empire
- Name: SMS Kingani
- Namesake: Kingani River
- Builder: Meyer Werft, Papenburg
- Yard number: 92
- Laid down: 1893
- Launched: January 1894
- Commissioned: 8 February 1894
- Renamed: Renamed HMS Fifi after being captured
- Captured: 26 December 1915

United Kingdom
- Name: HMS Fifi
- Captured: 26 December 1915
- Fate: Scuttled in 1924

General characteristics
- Type: Screw steamer
- Displacement: 45 metric tons (44 long tons; 50 short tons)
- Length: 17.75 m (58 ft 3 in) o/a
- Beam: 3.65 m (12 ft 0 in)
- Draught: 1.3 m (4 ft 3 in)
- Propulsion: 1 × 85.5 ihp (64 kW) steam engine
- Speed: 9.4 knots (17.4 km/h; 10.8 mph)
- Complement: 1 officer, 7 men
- Armament: 1 × 3.7 cm (1.5 in) Hotchkiss revolver gun

HMS Fifi was an armed screw steamer, captured from the Germans by Royal Navy units during the Battle for Lake Tanganyika, and used to support Anglo-Belgian operations on the lake and its surrounding areas. She had previously been operated by the Germans under the name Kingani named after the river Kingani.

After a short career supporting German troop movements in central Africa, she was unexpectedly challenged by two motor boats, named HMS Mimi and HMS Toutou, which had been transported from Britain to the lake by an expedition led by Lieutenant-Commander Geoffrey Spicer-Simson. The faster and more nimble motor boats were able to chase down Kingani, which was unable to bring her larger weapon to bear on the small vessels without turning to face them. After being hit several times and crippled, and with her commanding officer and several men dead, she surrendered and was brought back to the British base. Brought into British service as Fifi, she became the first German warship to be captured and transferred to the Royal Navy.

Fifi went on to join the Anglo-Belgian flotilla in attacking and sinking her former consort, Hedwig von Wissmann, after a prolonged engagement which left Fifi with only two shells remaining, before she scored a crucial hit. She supported further Allied operations on the lake, which involved working with land forces, but the flotilla did not participate in any offensive actions, and the last remaining German vessel, Graf von Götzen, was left unmolested. Fifi spent her last days as a government steamer, carrying passengers across the lake, until being scuttled as unseaworthy in 1924.

== Construction ==
Kingani was one of two screw steamers constructed by Meyer Werft in Papenburg, Germany in 1893/4 for service as customs cruisers in the German East Africa. The ships displaced 45 t (44 long tons; 50 short tons) (20 GRT), their length overall was 17.75 m (58.2 ft) with a 3.65 m (12.0 ft) beam. An engine (one boiler with 30 m^{2} (320 sq ft) and 10 at) delivered 85.5 indicated horsepower (63.8 kW) for a maximum speed of 9.4 kn (17.4 km/h; 10.8 mph). Crewed by one officer and seven men, the boats were armed with a 3.7 cm (1.5 in) revolver gun.

== Service ==
Kingani served with German customs on Lake Tanganyika until 1913 when she was transferred to the Ostafrikanische Eisenbahn-Gesellschaft. On 10 November 1914 she was drafted to guard Lake Tanganyika together with Hedwig von Wissmann.

== Strategic situation on Lake Tanganyika ==
Kingani formed part of the small German naval flotilla on the lake, consisting initially of Kingani and the 60-ton Hedwig von Wissmann, but joined in June 1915 by the 1,200-ton Graf von Götzen. These ships had secured control of Lake Tanganyika after destroying the Belgian steamer Alexandre del Commune shortly after the start of the war, and were being used by the Germans to support their land forces in the region. German control of the lake was significant for the whole campaign in the central African theatre. While the British could muster troops to the south of the lake, and the Belgians had troops to the north, neither could push into German East Africa because of the risk that the Germans would use their boats to transport troops across the lake, and use them to cut their supply and communications lines. Sallying out of their homeport of Kigoma on the eastern side of the lake, the German vessels transported troops to carry out raids on Belgian territory, and also bombarded the Belgian port of Lukuga.

In response to these raids, and needing to secure control of the lake to prevent German raids and to support their own troops in the field, the Admiralty despatched an expedition, led by Lieutenant-Commander Geoffrey Spicer-Simson, to transport two motor boats named HMS Mimi and HMS Toutou by sea, rail, river and road to the lake. Once there he was to sink or disable the German vessels, and secure control of the lake. After an arduous journey the two boats reached the lake and were launched on 22 and 23 December.

== Kingani reconnoitres ==
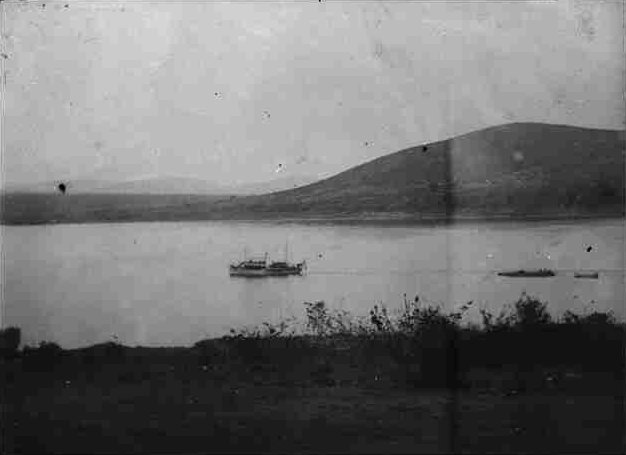
The Kingani on Lake Tanganyika before being captured.

The commander of the German naval forces, Captain Gustav Zimmer, had placed Lieutenant Job Rosenthal, who had served aboard the cruiser SMS Königsberg until her sinking at the Battle of Rufiji Delta, in command of Kingani. Rosenthal was ordered to investigate Belgian preparations for assembling and launching their large steamer Baron Dhanis. Rosenthal took Kingani close to Kalemie, where work was underway to construct a harbour to base Mimi and Toutou, but had to keep clear of two 12-pounder guns that were being used as shore batteries. Rosenthal returned early on 2 December and swam ashore to investigate. In doing so he discovered Mimi and Toutou, but was captured before he could return to make his report. In his absence, Sub-Lieutenant Junge took over command of Kingani. Still lacking detailed information on Belgian plans, Zimmer sent Junge to carry out a reconnaissance mission, and on 26 December Kingani again approached Kalemie.

== Kingani is captured ==
Kingani was spotted from the shore, and Spicer-Simson's men quickly took to the water, cutting Kingani off from her base. Taken by surprise Junge ordered Kingani's speed to be increased, but as the six-pounder gun mounted in the forepart of Kingani could only fire forward, he was forced to circle to aim at the lead British boat, Mimi. The Germans also opened fire with rifles, as the British boats closed on Kingani. Eventually the British scored a direct hit, a three-pounder shell passing through the gunshield and killing Junge, and two petty officers, Penne and Schwarz. Several more shells hit Kingani, starting fires and flooding. With Junge dead, the chief engineer hauled down the colours and waved a white handkerchief. Mimi then approached, accidentally ramming Kingani at full speed. Toutou also came alongside, and took possession of Kingani, which was then sailed back to shore.

== HMS Fifi joins the flotilla ==
Junge and four dead crewmembers were buried, and after a hole in Kingani's hull had been patched, she was taken into service as HMS Fifi. Spicer-Simson explained that Fifi meant 'tweet-tweet' in French, and was suggested by the wife of a Belgian officer who had a small caged bird. Her 6-pounder gun was moved to her stern, while one of the 12-pounder guns that had been mounted as a shore battery was fixed to the bows. The Admiralty was impressed by the expedition's achievements, Spicer-Simson was specially promoted to commander from the date of the action, and a message was sent which read "His Majesty The King desires to express his appreciation of the wonderful work carried out by his most remote expedition"; The Colonial Office also expressed its approbation. Fifi became the first German warship to be captured and brought into service with the Royal Navy.

== Fifi battles Hedwig ==
It was not until mid-January that Hedwig appeared to investigate the loss of Kingani, which was assumed to have strayed within range of the shore batteries and been sunk. Hedwig returned on 8 February, having failed to learn anything significant on her first pass, and this time the British were ready. Spicer-Simson had taken command of Fifi, and supported by Mimi and two Belgian vessels, took his flotilla in pursuit. Odebrecht spotted the approaching vessels, but continued to advance. Initially mistaking them for Belgian craft, the White Ensigns revealed that they were British. He continued towards the shore until making a sharp turn to port at 9.30am, either attempting to lure them toward Götzen, or having been fooled by an optical illusion into thinking the approaching vessels were larger than he had first thought. The pursuing vessels chased Hedwig, with Fifi opening fire with her bow mounted 12-pounder. The recoil stopped her dead in her tracks, Odebrecht used this to pull away. Hedwig could do 9 knots (17 km/h; 10 mph) to Fifi's 8 knots (15 km/h; 9.2 mph), but as Fifi fell behind, Mimi sped past, firing on the retreating German vessel with her 3-pounder gun. The shots missed, but Hedwig's stern guns did not have the range of Mimi's weapon, and Odebrecht was forced to come about and try to hit her with his bow-mounted 6-pounder. The two circled for a time, unable to score hits, until Fifi closed. Spicer-Simson, commanding aboard Fifi, was down to three shells on his 12-pounder, and risked being outclassed if Hedwig could bring her own 6-pounder to bear. At this moment, the shell jammed in Fifi's gun, and in the twenty minutes that it took to clear it, Hedwig again pulled away, searching for Götzen. With her second to last shot, Fifi fired again. The shell hit Hedwig's hull, causing flooding, while moments later her last shell hit the engine room, bursting the boiler and killing five African sailors and two Germans. As fires began to spread through the stricken craft Odebrecht gave the order to abandon ship, and set explosive charges to destroy the sinking vessel. The British picked up the survivors, and also captured a large German naval ensign, the first to be taken in the war.

== Later operations ==
The flotilla returned to shore with their prisoners, and the following day Götzen appeared offshore, steaming slowly past in search of the missing Hedwig. Alerted, the crews rushed to man their boats, but Spicer-Simson forbade an attack. Naval operations on the lake largely ceased thereafter, and by May the Belgians were about to capture Kigoma and a British force was pushing north towards Bismarckburg. The expedition received orders to support the land operations from the lake, and the flotilla, consisting of Mimi, Toutou, Fifi and Vengeur arrived off Bismarckburg on 5 June. Finding the harbour defended by a fort, Spicer-Simson decided not to attack, and withdrew to Kituta. This allowed the German forces to escape in a fleet of dhows, an act with provoked the anger of the army commander, Lieutenant-Colonel Murray. The naval expeditionary force remained at Bismarckburg, where Spicer-Simson was chastened to learn that the fort's guns were in fact wooden dummies. Götzen was disarmed and then scuttled as the Germans withdrew from the lake and the Allies secured their supremacy on the lake. Spicer-Simson would later claim prize-money for the successful capture of Fifi.

== Post-war and disposal ==
Fifi remained in service for the rest of the war, and became the government steam launch, carrying passengers and cargo from Kigoma to the southern ports on the lake on behalf of the Marine Department of the Tanganyikan government. In 1922 the fare was 2½ cents a mile for Africans, 9 cents a mile for Europeans. Considered unseaworthy by 1924, she was towed 3 miles (4.8 km) out of Kigoma and sunk in 200 feet (61 m) of water.
