= Geoffrey Spicer-Simson =

Royal Navy officer (1876–1947)

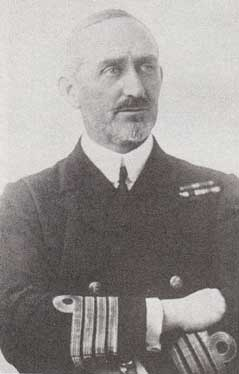
- Geoffrey Spicer-Simson
- Born: 15 January 1876; Hobart, Tasmania
- Died: 29 January 1947 (aged 71)
- Military career
- Allegiance: United Kingdom
- Branch: Royal Navy
- Service years: 1889–1921
- Rank: Commander
- Conflicts: World War I: Battle for Lake Tanganyika
- Awards: Distinguished Service Order; Order of the Crown (Belgium)

Commander Geoffrey Basil Spicer-Simson DSO (15 January 1876 – 29 January 1947) was a Royal Navy officer. He served in the Mediterranean, Pacific and Home Fleets. He is most famous for his role as leader of a naval expedition to Lake Tanganyika in 1915, where he commanded a small flotilla which defeated a superior German force during the Battle for Lake Tanganyika.

== Early life ==
Geoffrey Basil Spicer Simson was born in Hobart, Tasmania, on 15 January 1876, one of five children. His father, Frederick Simson, had been in the merchant navy and was a dealer in gold sovereigns in India who eventually settled in Le Havre, France, at the age of thirty-one. There he met eighteen-year-old Dora Spicer, daughter of a visiting English clergyman, William Webb Spicer, and on marrying changed his name to Spicer-Simson. In 1874 the Spicer-Simsons moved to Tasmania where they started a family and ran a sheep farm for five years. Though Geoffrey was born in Tasmania, he soon moved to France at his mother's wishes. He and his siblings were sent to schools in England. The eldest, Theodore Spicer-Simson, became a world-famous medallion portrait artist, moving between France and the United States. His youngest brother, Noel, eventually joined the British Army.

Geoffrey joined the Royal Navy in 1890 at the age of fourteen and was rated midshipman on 15 June 1892. His naval career started relatively well, being advanced seven months in seniority out of a possible 12 for his passing out results at H.M.S. Britannia. However, he lost two months of this additional seniority for being found absent without leave in 1894. He was promoted to acting sub-lieutenant on 19 February 1896, and confirmed in the rank of sub-lieutenant on 20 January 1897, back-dated to the original acting promotion date. He was promoted to lieutenant on 30 September 1898.

Geoffrey would begin to specialise in surveying, and served on the North Borneo Boundary Commission in 1901, helping in the construction of several maps and the definition of boundaries. In 1902 he married Amy Elizabeth, daughter of Edmund and Phoebe Baynes-Reed of Victoria, British Columbia. Geoffrey would soon be posted to a Royal Navy destroyer however, following a collision with a liberty boat Geoffrey was posted to a shore posting on watch-keeping duties. He was then posted to China and made the first triangulated survey of the Yangtze River from 1905 to 1908. After China, he was posted to Africa, and from 1911 to 1914 was in command of a survey ship on the Gambia river.

He returned to Britain from Africa just days before Britain officially joined World War I on 4 August 1914. He had a brief tour on a contraband control vessel, where two weeks after taking command one of his gunboats, HMS Niger, was torpedoed in broad daylight. He then took up a posting in the Admiralty in the department in charge of transferring Merchant sailors to the War Navy.

== "Simson's Circus" ==
In April 1915, the Admiralty learned that Germany was preparing to launch Graf von Götzen onto Lake Tanganyika. Götzen was much larger than any other vessel on the lake and would give German forces supremacy across its entire length. With control of the Lake, Germany could easily move troops and materials to support its efforts in and around German East Africa. To counter Götzen, two small, fast and well-armed motorboats would be sent from Britain.

Spicer-Simson with his experience in Africa and fluency in French and German was appointed by the Admiralty to lead the expedition despite his undistinguished record. His commanders saw nothing to lose in sending him to what was considered a sideshow to the events in Europe.

The two motorboats, which Spicer-Simson named Mimi and Toutou (the Admiralty having rejected his initial proposal that they be named Cat and Dog), were loaded aboard SS Llanstephen Castle on 15 June along with the expedition's equipment and supplies. Two special trailers and cradles were also brought along to allow them to be transported by rail or overland. The first leg of Mimi and Toutou's 10,000 mi (16,000 km) journey was completed after 17 days at sea and their arrival at the Cape of Good Hope.

From Cape Town, they and the men of the expedition traveled north by railway through Bulawayo to Elisabethville, where they arrived on 26 July. After traveling to the railhead at Fungurume, they were detrained and dragged 146 mi (235 km) through the bush by teams of oxen and steam tractors to the beginnings of the railway from Sankisia to Bukama. At Bukama, the boats and stores were unloaded and prepared for a voyage down the Lualaba River. The Lualaba was running low, and Mimi and Toutou had to be paddled 56 miles (90 km) upstream, including running aground fourteen times in just 12 miles (19 km). They spent seventeen days on the Lualaba before reaching Kabalo. From there, the last 175 miles (282 km) of the journey to Lake Tanganyika was completed by railway. The expedition, known by that point as "Simson's Circus" for all it had been through, arrived at the Belgian lake port of Lukuga on 24 October 1915.

== Battle for Lake Tanganyika ==
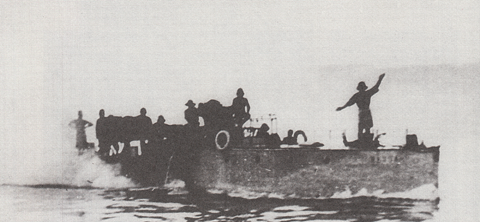
Spicer-Simson (standing) on the deck of the Belgian vessel Netta.

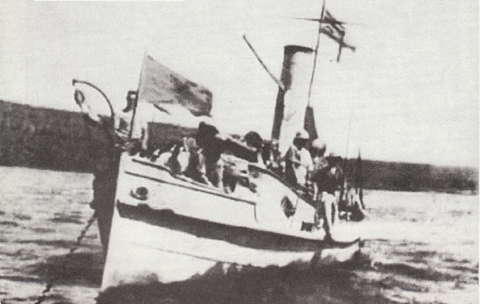
Kingani later HMS Fifi

Shortly after arriving on Lake Tanganyika, Spicer-Simson relocated his base just south of Lukuga at Kalemie, where he had been building a port better protected from the lake's storms. Mimi and Toutou were assembled and launched just before Christmas 1915. Early in the morning of 26 December, the armed German tug Kingani was spotted offshore. Spicer-Simson took Mimi and Toutou out on the lake and captured Kingani after a brief firefight that killed her commander and four of her crew. Kingani was rechristened HMS Fifi and brought under Spicer-Simson's command. As a result, on 3 January 1916, he was promoted from lieutenant commander to commander; the promotion backdated to 26 December 1915, the date of the capture.

On 9 February 1916, the German lake boat Hedwig von Wissmann (sister vessel of the larger Hermann von Wissmann on Lake Nyasa) appeared off Lukuga to investigate the disappearance of Kingani. After a 30-mile (48 km) chase, Spicer-Simson's flotilla sank Hedwig von Wissmann.

The capture of Kingani and the sinking of Hedwig von Wissmann greatly weakened German naval power on Lake Tanganyika. However, a survivor of Kingani reported that Götzen had recently been armed with a gun from the recently scuttled German cruiser Königsberg. The addition of a Königsberg gun gave the Götzen the ability to effectively fire on Mimi, Toutou, and Fifi from well beyond their range. Though Götzen could not be directly attacked, German supremacy on Lake Tanganyika had been broken.

For the action against Hedwig von Wissmann, Spicer-Simson was awarded the Distinguished Service Order on 1 May 1916. Over the course of the expedition, three of his officers were awarded the Distinguished Service Cross, and twelve of his men were awarded the Distinguished Service Medal.

After its initial success, Spicer-Simson's command ended in controversy. He refused to send his ships to aid the British Colonial and Belgian Army force in the capture of Mpulungu in present-day Zambia. After falling ill and retreating to his private quarters, he was sent to England for medical and mental recovery. He was also appointed a Commander of the Belgian Order of the Crown.

== Eccentricities ==
Geoffrey Spicer-Simson (extreme left wearing skirt) just after the German ship Kingani had been captured.

Spicer-Simson was known for his idiosyncrasies. In Britain he had originally suggested that Mimi and Toutou be named Cat and Dog, but the names were rejected by the Admiralty. After Mimi and Toutou were accepted as alternatives, he explained that these meant "Miaow" and "Bow-wow" in French. While in command on Lake Tanganyika, Spicer-Simson often wore a khaki drill skirt (kilt) , and he insisted that an Admiral's flag be flown outside his hut. He smoked monogrammed cigarettes and had a number of "macabre tattoos" acquired during his time in Asia.

== Later life ==
He was later Assistant Director of Naval Intelligence, with the rank of acting captain, and a naval delegate and French translator at the Versailles Peace Conference in 1919. After acting as secretary and official interpreter to the First International Hydrographic Conference, London, 1919, he was elected the first secretary-general of the International Hydrographic Organization. He served in that role from 1921 to 1937. His later years were spent in British Columbia. He gave a series of lectures on his command on Lake Tanganyika and helped write a National Geographic article on his transportation of the two boats through the jungles of the Congo. He died on 29 January 1947.

== Awards ==
=== United Kingdom ===
- Distinguished Service Order (1915)
- China War Medal (1900)
- 1914–15 Star (1919)
- British War Medal (1920)
- Victory Medal (1920)
- King George V Silver Jubilee Medal (1935)
- King George VI Coronation Medal (1937)

=== Foreign ===
- Commander, Order of the Crown (Belgium)
- Commander, Order of Saint-Charles (Monaco)
- War Cross with three palms (Belgium)

== In popular culture ==
The events of his flotilla at Lake Tanganyika inspired the novel and film The African Queen.

Spicer-Simson was the subject of the BBC Radio drama Navy Man God, by Christopher Russell. First broadcast on 19 January 1985, and regularly repeated on digital BBC Radio 7 after being rediscovered.
