= HMS Mimi and HMS Toutou =

History

United Kingdom
- Name: HMS Mimi / HMS Toutou
- Builder: John I. Thornycroft & Company
- Launched: 1915
- Commissioned: 1915
- Fate: Unknown

General characteristics
- Type: Motor Launch
- Length: 40 ft (12 m)
- Propulsion: 2 × 100 hp (75 kW) petrol engines, twin screws
- Speed: 19 knots (35 km/h; 22 mph)
- Armament: 1 × 3-pounder Hotchkiss gun (fore); 1 × Maxim gun (aft)

HMS Mimi and HMS Toutou were motor launches of the Royal Navy. After undergoing an unusual journey from Britain to Lake Tanganyika in the interior of Africa, the ships played an important role in the African naval struggle between Britain and Germany during World War I. The names mean Meow and Fido in Parisian slang. They had originally been named Dog and Cat by their erstwhile commander, Geoffrey Spicer-Simson, only to have the names rejected by an apparently scandalized Admiralty.

== Journey to Tanganyika ==
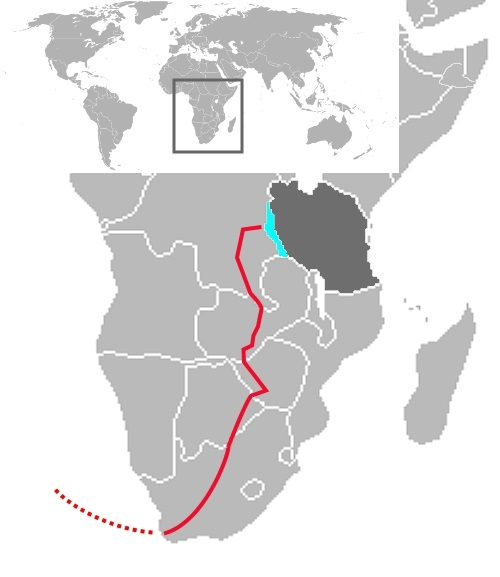
Approximate route of Mimi and Toutou overland to Lake Tanganyika (July–October 1915).

The ships eventually named the Mimi and Toutou were being built at the Thornycroft Yards on the Thames at the beginning of the war. Originally commissioned for the Greek army, the ships were requisitioned by the Admiralty to meet the needs of a scheme to create an African inland navy. Both Mimi and her sister ship HMS Toutou had a length of 40 feet (12 m) and could travel at up to 19 knots (35 km/h; 22 mph) by virtue of two 100 horsepower (75 kW) petrol engines attached to twin screws. This would make the ships the fastest on Lake Tanganyika when they eventually arrived. The British armed them with a 3-pounder in the fore and a Maxim gun aft. Although it was discovered that the frames of the boats could not endure the 3-pounder's recoil when not fired straight ahead, it was hoped that the boat's impressive manoeuvrability would offset this limitation.

The launches underwent trials on 8 June 1915, and by the middle of the month were packed aboard a liner destined for Cape Town, South Africa. The vessels were the nucleus of an expedition whose goal was to achieve naval superiority in the strategically important Lake Tanganyika. The expedition's leader was the colourful naval officer Spicer-Simson. At the beginning of July they arrived in South Africa, where the ships were loaded onto a train bound for Elisabethville in the Belgian Congo, and finally the village of Fungurume, where the line ended. By 6 August, the ships and equipment were offloaded and the expedition prepared to drive into the bush.

It took nearly a month and a half to travel the 100 or more miles from Fungurume to Sankisia, the railhead for a narrow-gauge railway. The terrain in between was mountainous and broken, requiring the construction of 150 bridges over various streams and gorges. The movement was accomplished by the brute force of two steam tractors, dozens of oxen, and hundreds of Africans employed for the expedition. At some points, even this was not enough, and complex winching systems were developed to lever the ships over the more formidable inclines. Even after the railroad was reached, the difficulties continued, as there were still some 500 miles to go. Streams which Spicer-Simson had depended on for navigation turned out to be nearly dry: the ships had to be raised on barrel rafts to float, and even then they had to be portaged dozens of times. Finally, however, the wearied expedition arrived at Lake Tanganyika on 26 October.

== Naval career ==
Mimi and Toutou were finally launched around the end of December, and by 26 December they experienced their first action. The German ship Kingani was sighted, and the allied "fleet" gave chase. In the lead of the formation was Mimi, commanded by Spicer-Simson. After evading the initial German fire, Mimi and Toutou opened fire at noon, eventually puncturing Kingani's hull below the waterline. With water coming in and the commander dead, the German ship struck her colours. Mimi struck her while preparing to board, and the damage caused threatened to sink her; she managed to run aground just before foundering. Kingani limped to port under escort, and once repaired, was renamed Fifi and added to the British force.

The British got their second opportunity on 9 February 1916. This time the German opponent was the warship Hedwig von Wissmann. Fifi, now Spicer-Simson's flagship, and Mimi, commanded by a Sub-Lieutenant A E Wainwright, gave chase. Fifi and Hedwig von Wissmann were evenly matched for speed, and due to unusual optical effects on the lake, Fifi's rounds kept going wide of the mark. Ignoring orders to stay behind, Wainwright took advantage of Mimi's speed and zoomed ahead to harass the rear of the German ship. In order to fight back, Hedwig von Wissmann would have to turn around to bring her main guns to bear; when this happened Mimi would dodge away and Fifi could close her range. Eventually, Fifi scored a direct hit and Hedwig von Wissmann sank. For this action, Wainwright was awarded the Distinguished Service Cross.

Although there were still German vessels on the lake (most notably Graf von Götzen, armed with a formidable gun from the cruiser Königsberg), Spicer-Simson retreated to a cautious strategy, constraining himself to ineffectual support of the land campaign. Mimi would not be involved in further dramatic lake battles. She was apparently taken out and scuttled in the 1920s.
