= EAR 60 class =

East African Railways 60 class
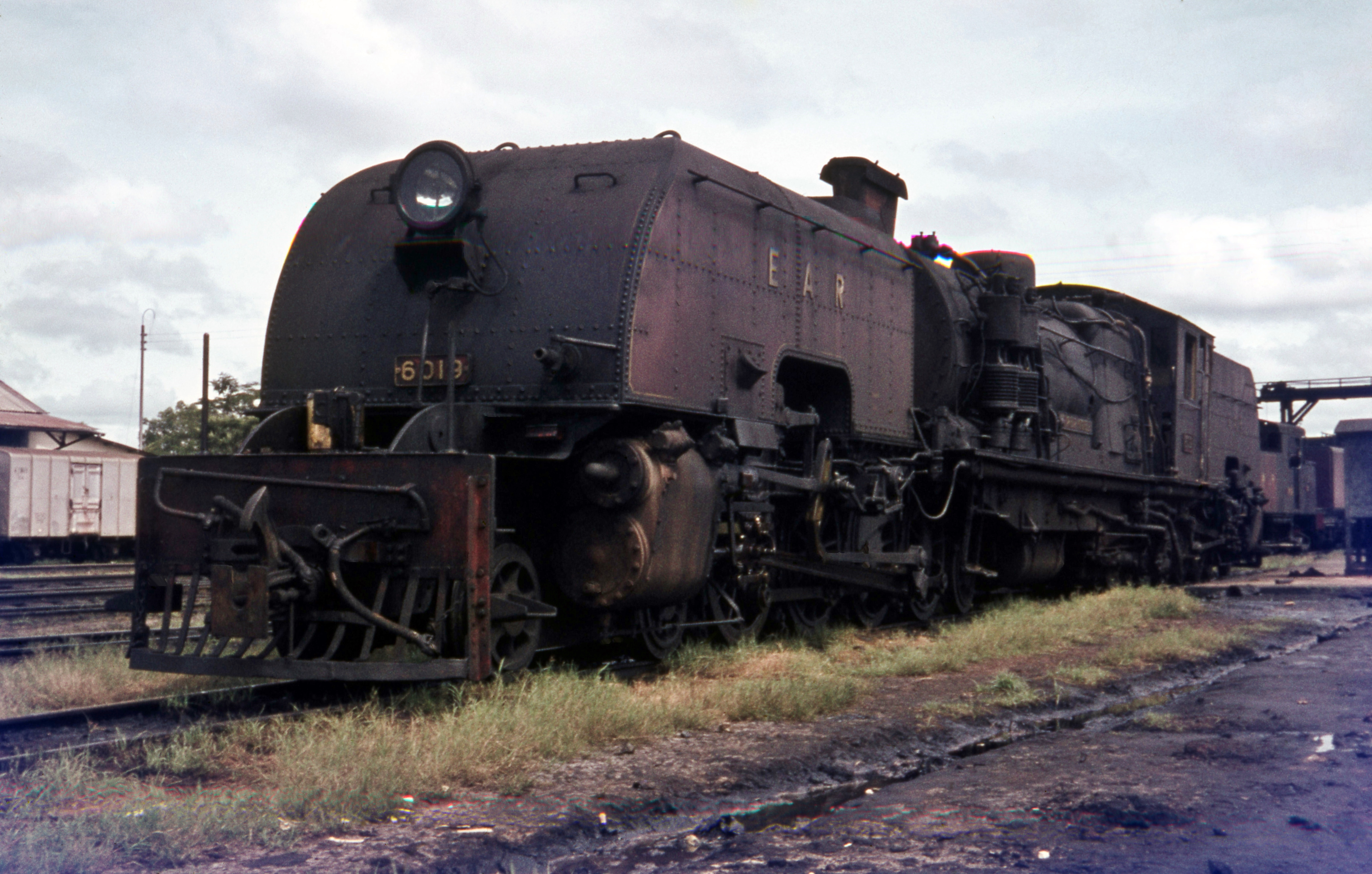
- No. 6019 at Tabora depot, Tanzania, in 1968
Type and origin
- Power type: Steam
- Builder: Beyer, Peacock & Co. (some subcontracted to Société Franco-Belge)
- Serial number: 7565–7580 (2983–2994), 7659–7666, 7721–7725
- Build date: 1953–1954
- Total produced: 29
Specifications
- Configuration
  - Whyte: 4-8-2+2-8-4 (Garratt)
  - UIC: (2′D1′)(1′D2′) h4
- Gauge: 1,000 mm (3 ft 3 3/8 in)
- Driver dia.: 48 in (1,219 mm)
- Adhesive weight: 86.9 long tons (88.3 t)
- Loco weight: 152.3 long tons (154.7 t)
- Fuel type: Oil
- Fuel capacity: 1,800 imp gal (8,200 L; 2,200 US gal)
- Water cap.: 4,612 imp gal (20,970 L; 5,539 US gal)
- Firebox
  - Grate area: 48.8 sq ft (4.53 m^{2})
- Boiler pressure: 200 psi (1.38 MPa)
- Heating surface
  - Firebox: 170 sq ft (16 m^{2})
  - Tubes: 1,729 sq ft (160.6 m^{2})
  - Total surface: 2,269 sq ft (210.8 m^{2})
- Superheater
  - Type: Inside
  - Heating area: 370 sq ft (34 m^{2})
- Cylinders: 4 (Garratt)
- Cylinder size: 16 in × 24 in (406 mm × 610 mm)
- Valve gear: Walschaerts
- Loco brake: Westinghouse type
- Train brakes: Westinghouse type
Performance figures
- Tractive effort: 43,520 lbf (193.59 kN)
Career
- Operators: East African Railways (EAR)
- Class: 60 class
- Number in class: 29
- Numbers: 6001–6029
- First run: 1953
- Disposition: One preserved; others scrapped

The EAR 60 class, also known as the Governor class, was a class of 1,000 mm (3 ft 3 3/8 in) gauge 4-8-2+2-8-4 Garratt-type articulated steam locomotives built for the East African Railways as a development of the EAR's existing 56 class.

== History ==
The 29 members of the 60 class were ordered by the EAR from Beyer, Peacock & Co. The first 12 of them were built by sub-contractors Société Franco-Belge in Raismes (Valenciennes), France, and the rest were built by Beyer, Peacock in Gorton, Manchester, England. The class entered service in 1953-54.

Initially, all members of the class carried the name of a Governor (or equivalent) of Kenya, Tanganyika or Uganda, but later all of the Governor nameplates were removed.

== Class list ==
The builder's and fleet numbers, and initial names, of each member of the class were as follows:

BP builder's no. (Note: Beyer, Peacock & Co. builder's number)	SFB builder's no. (Note: Société Franco-Belge builder's number)	EAR number	Initial name (Note: The nameplates bearing these names were later removed.)	Notes
7565	2983	6001	Sir Geoffrey Archer	Later renamed Umoja ("Unity")
7566	2984	6002	Sir Hesketh Bell	
7567	2985	6003	Sir Stewart Symes	
7568	2986	6004	Sir Frederick Jackson	
7569	2987	6005	Sir Bernard Bourdillon	
7570	2988	6006	Sir Harold MacMichael	Preserved at Nairobi Railway Museum as a static exhibit (with Sir Harold MacMichael nameplates)
7571	2989	6007	Sir Mark Young	
7572	2990	6008	Sir Wilfrid Jackson	
7573	2991	6009	Sir Edward Twining	
7574	2992	6010	Sir Donald Cameron	
7575	2993	6011	Sir William Battershill	
7576	2994	6012	Sir Percy Girouard	
7577	–	6013	Sir Henry Belfield	
7578	–	6014	Sir Joseph Byrne	
7579	–	6015	Sir Robert Brooke-Popham	
7580	–	6016	Sir Henry Moore	
7659	–	6017	Sir John Hall	
7660	–	6018	Sir Charles Dundas	
7661	–	6019	Sir Philip Mitchell	
7662	–	6020	Sir Evelyn Baring	
7663	–	6021	Sir William Gowers	
7664	–	6022	Sir Andrew Cohen	
7665	–	6023	Sir Edward Northey	
7666	–	6024	Sir James Hayes-Sadler	
7721	–	6025	Sir Henry Colville	
7722	–	6026	Sir Horace Byatt	Later renamed Uhuru ("Freedom")
7723	–	6027	Sir Gerald Portal	
7724	–	6028	Sir H. H. Johnston	
7725	–	6029	Sir Edward Grigg	

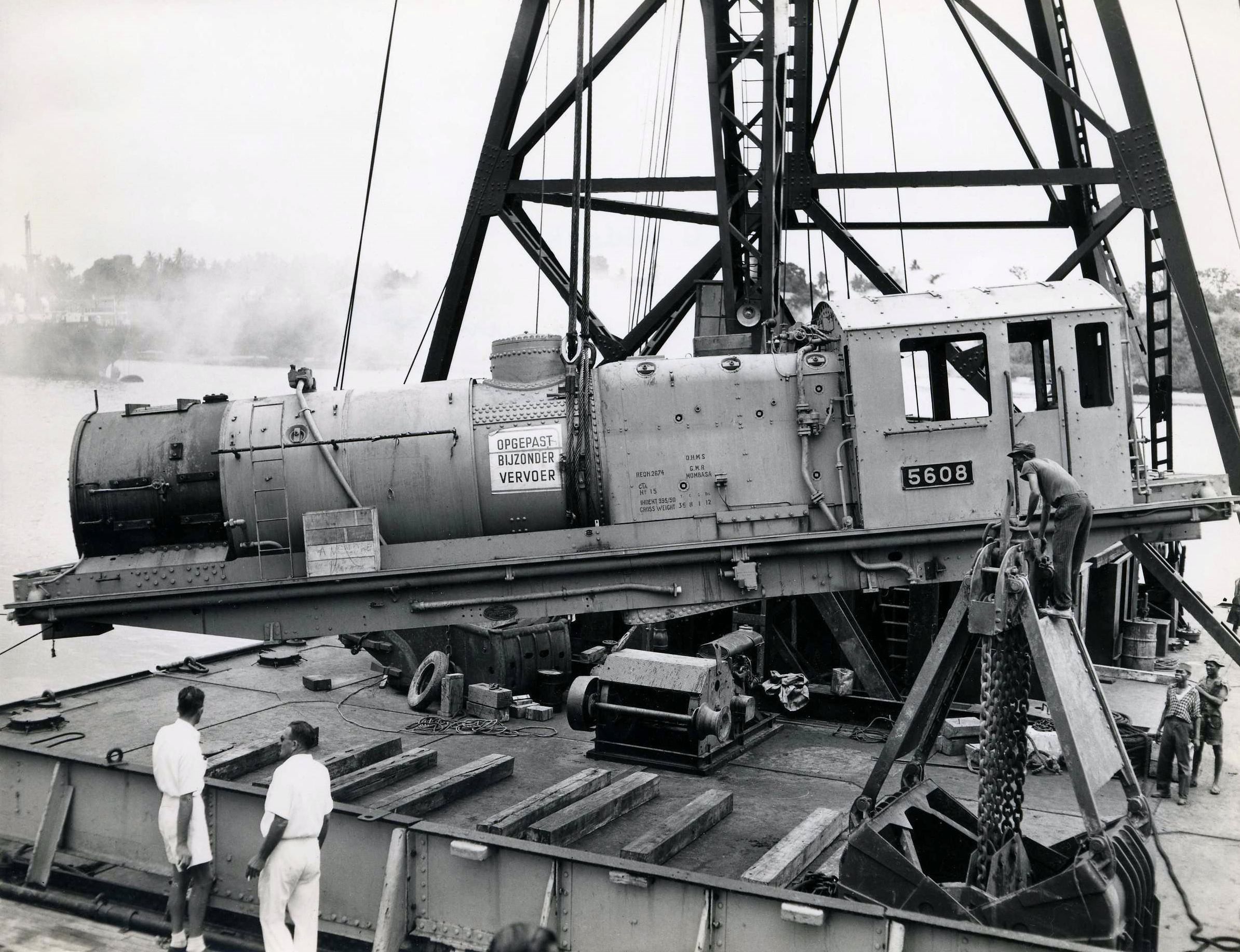
A 60 class locomotive being unloaded at Mombasa, Kenya, prior to entering service

== See also ==
- List of colonial governors of Kenya
- List of governors of Tanganyika
- List of governors of Uganda
- Rail transport in Kenya
- Rail transport in Uganda
