= Donald Kingdon =

British jurist

Sir Donald Kingdon
- Born: 24 November 1883
- Died: 17 December 1961 (aged 78)
- Education: St. John's College, Cambridge
- Occupations: Barrister; Civil Servant; Legal theorist.
- Known for: Attorney-General of Nigeria (1919 - 1925); Chief Justice of the Supreme Court of Nigeria (1929 - 1946)
- Awards: Knight Bachelor

Sir Donald Kingdon (24 November 1883 – 17 December 1961) was a British judicial officer who served as Chief Justice of the Supreme Court of Nigeria from 1929 to 1946. He remains Nigeria's longest serving Chief Justice. He served under Graeme Thomson, Donald Cameron, Bernard Bourdillon, and Arthur Richards.

He also served as the Attorney-General of Nigeria, from 1919 to 1925, and edited and composed several authoritative books about West African laws.

== Early life ==
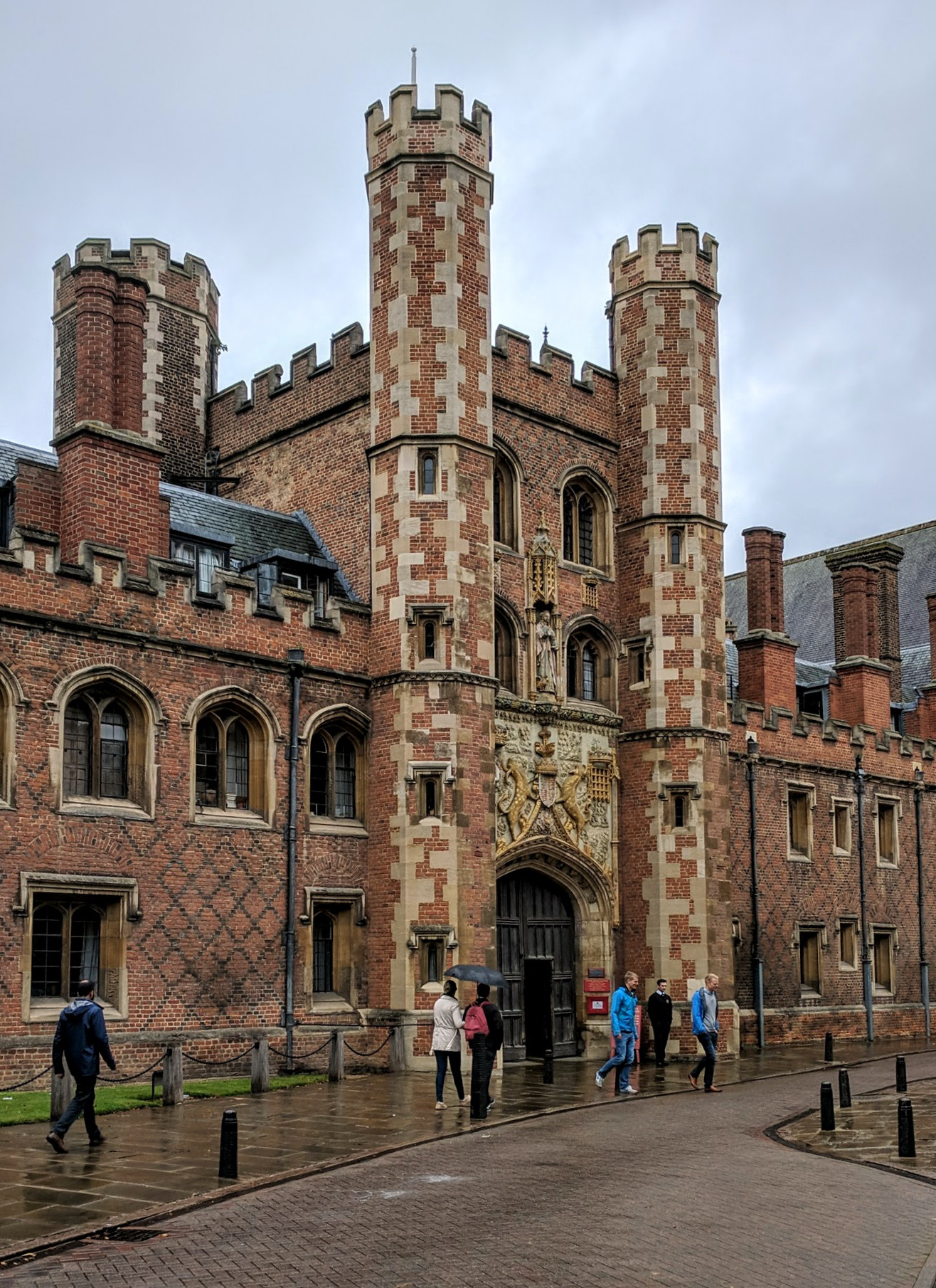
Kingdon was educated at St. John's College, Cambridge

Kingdon, who was born in November 1883, was the son of Walter Kingdon, of North Foreland, Kent, and Mary Elizabeth Billing, who was the daughter of John Billing FSA. He was educated at Eastbourne College, and at St John's College, Cambridge, and at Inner Temple, at which he was called to the bar in 1905.

== Career ==
Kingdon worked for the Colonial Service in Gambia as an Inspector of Schools and Legal Assistant, and later was a member of the country's Legislative Council. He was Attorney-General of Uganda, and he was in 1918 appointed as Attorney-General of the Gold Coast. He was a Knight Bachelor.

Kingdon was appointed as the head of a commission to investigate the 1929 and 1930 insurrections against taxation in the Calabar and Owerri Provinces that killed 55 people. The commission report found that inadequate police training and undue restriction on the investigation of criminality contributed to the violations of law.

He was knighted in 1931.

== Issue ==
Donald Kingdon in 1914 married Kathleen Moody, who was the eldest daughter of Charles Edmund Moody and who was the granddaughter of Major-General Richard Clement Moody (who was the founder of British Columbia) and of Mary Hawks of the Hawks industrial dynasty. Kingdon and Kathleen Moody had one son and two daughters:

- 1. Joan Campbell Kingdon (1915 - 1941). She married Hamish Forsyth who died in The Blitz. Joan was killed, in 1941, by a bomb blast, whilst driving an ambulance.
- 2. Richard Donald Kingdon (1917 - 1952). He married Leslie Eve Donnell. He died whilst piloting to Le Mans an aircraft, of which the engines failed, that crashed into the English Channel, whereupon he gave his life jacket to a passenger.
- 3. Elizabeth Kingdon.

== Books ==
- The Laws of Ashanti; Containing the Ordinances of Ashanti, and the Orders, Proclamations, Rules, Regulations and Bye-laws made thereunder, in force on the 31st Day of December 1919 (1920)
- The Laws of the Gambia in force on the 1st Day of January 1955 (1950)
- The Laws of the Federation of Nigeria and Lagos : in force on the 1st Day of June 1958 (Revised edition, 1959)
