= Uhuru =

Uhuru (a Swahili word meaning freedom) may refer to:

== People ==
- Uhuru Hamiter (born 1973), American football player
- Uhuru Kenyatta (born 1961), President of Kenya from 2013 to 2022

== Places ==
- Uhuru (Tanzanian ward), an administrative ward in the Dodoma Urban district of the Dodoma Region
- Uhuru Monument, or Uhuru Torch Monument, a landmark monument in Dar es Salaam, Tanzania
- Uhuru Park in Nairobi, Kenya
- Uhuru Peak, the highest summit on the rim of Kibo volcanic cone at Mount Kilimanjaro

== Music ==
- Uhuru (band), a South African music group
- "Uhuru", track from and reissue title of Welcome Home by Osibisa
- Uhuru, record label set up in 1971 by Roy Cousins
- "Uhuru", track on 2008 album Astrological Straits by Zach Hill
- "Uhuru", a single by Sun-El Musician and Azana, from album To the World & Beyond

== Other uses ==
- MV Uhuru, a Lake Victoria ferry in East Africa
- Uhuru, a name given to one of the East African Railways EAR 60 class locomotives
- Uhuru (satellite), the first satellite launched specifically for the purpose of X-ray astronomy
- Uhuru (novel), a 1962 novel by American author Robert Ruark
- Uhuru Design, a Brooklyn-based design and build sustainable furniture company
- Uhuru Mobile, a secure Android-based operating system
- Uhuru Torch, a national symbol of Tanzania
- Uhuru, a slogan used by the Proud Boys, a far-right neo-fascist group
- Uhuru Movement, a movement led by the African People's Socialist Party in the United States of America
- Uhuru Sasa, African-American cultural club in the Oregon State Penitentiary

== See also ==
- Uhura, a character in Star Trek
- Uluru, also known as Ayers Rock, a landform in Australia
- Harambee, another Swahili word which has seen considerable popular use
