= Deutsches Kolonial-Lexikon =

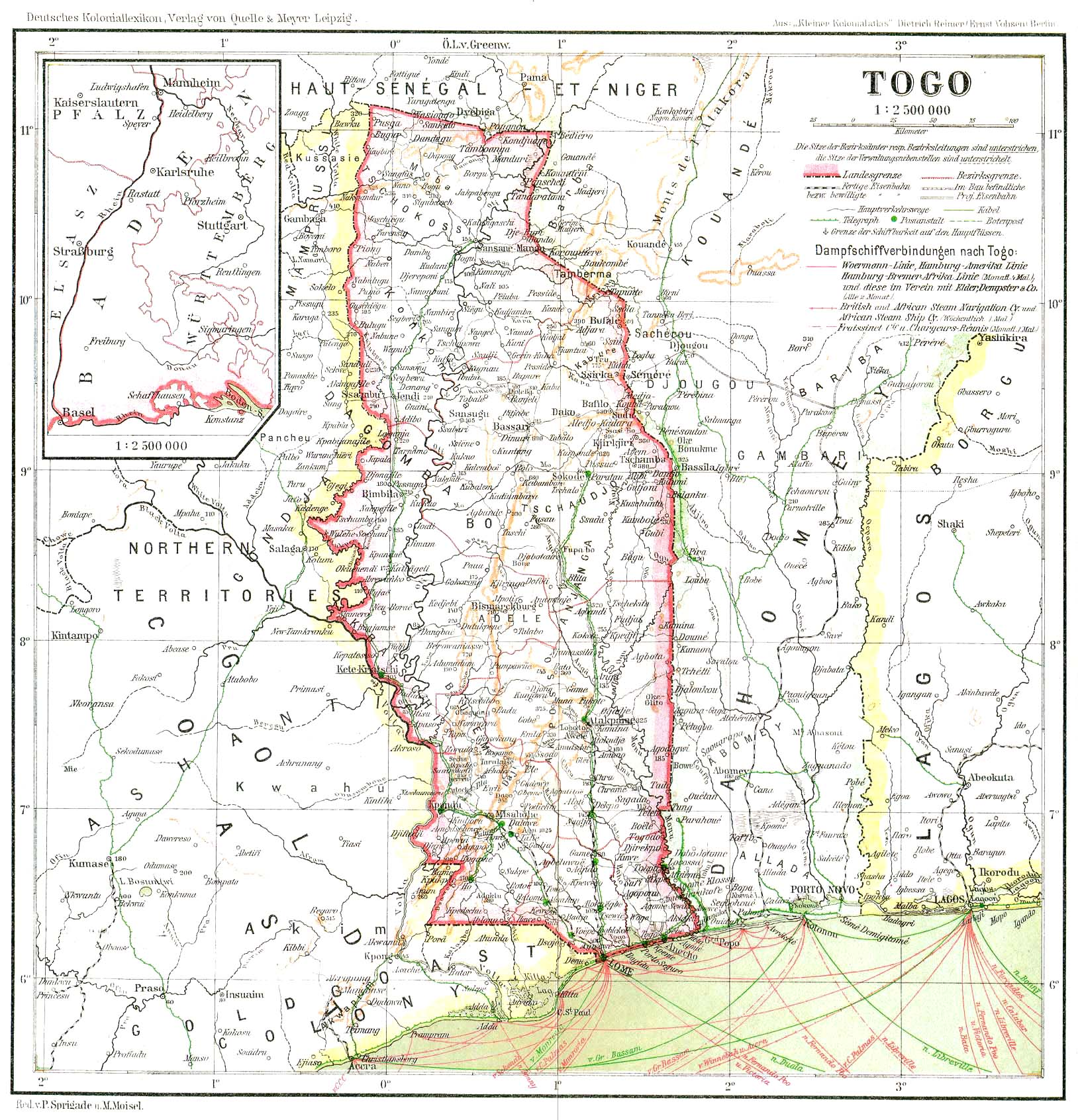
Map of German Togo from the book

Deutsches Kolonial-Lexikon is the German title for the Encyclopedia of German colonies which was published in 1920. The text had been finished by 1914 before World War I but was not printed due to the war. Thus it gives a wide range of information and then official views on the colonies of Germany at the end of its rule.

The encyclopedia was published 1920 in three volumes by a committee headed by the former governor of German East Africa, Heinrich Schnee. It was reprinted in 2006 by Fines Mundi publishers in Saarbrücken.

The complete German text has been digitalized and is available online.
