= Class 60 =

Class 60 may refer to:

- British Rail Class 60, a British diesel locomotive designed for heavy freight duties
- Caledonian Railway 60 Class
- DRG Class 60, a German steam locomotive class, formerly the LBE Nos. 1 to 3
- EAR 60 class
- New South Wales AD60 class locomotive
