= Bibi Mkuba: My Experiences in German East Africa during World War I =

1918 book by Ada Schnee

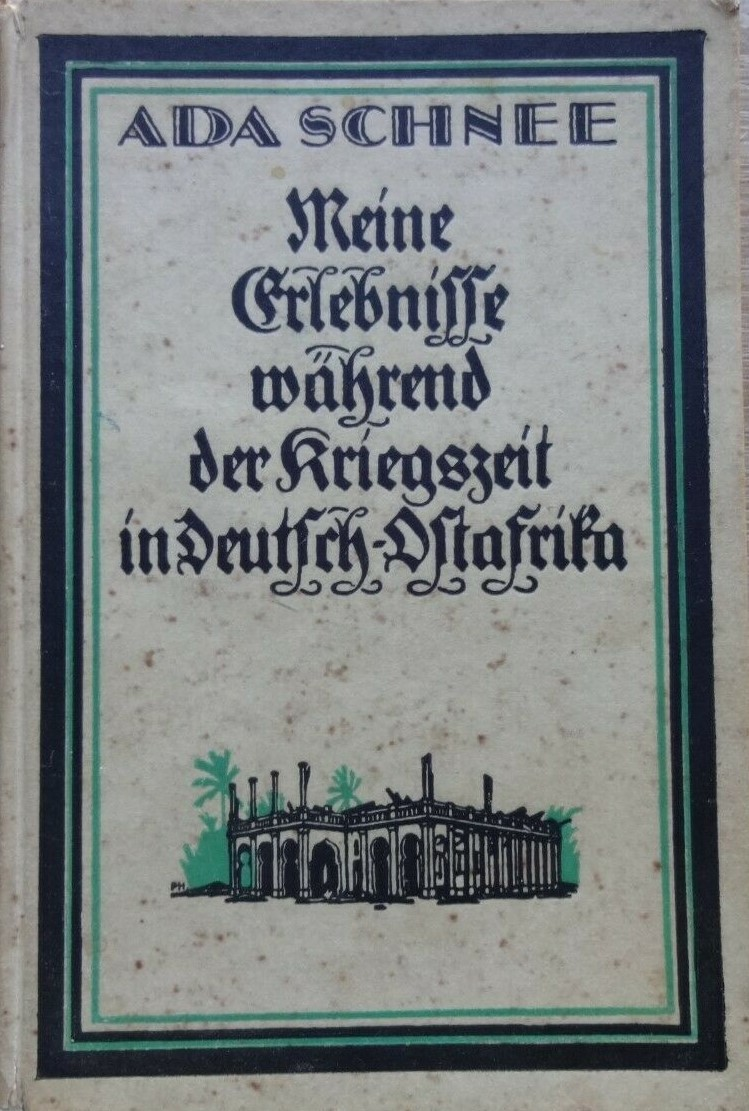
- Cover of the 1918 German edition
- Author: Ada Schnee
- Original title: Meine Erlebnisse während der Kriegszeit in Deutsch-Ostafrika
- Translator: Sam E. Edelstein Jr. and Barbara Ann Quarton
- Language: German original, English translation
- Genre: Memoir
- Publisher: Quelle & Meyer, Germany, Borgu Press, San Bernardino, US
- Publication date: 1918
- Publication place: Germany
- English publication date: 1995
- Pages: 112
- ISBN: 9780893703196

Bibi Mkuba: My Experiences in German East Africa during World War I (German: Meine Erlebnisse während der Kriegszeit in Deutsch-Ostafrika) is a wartime memoir by the naturalized German author Ada Schnee, the wife of the last governor of German East Africa, about her experience during the East African campaign of World War I. Finished in July 1918, this memoir on the war between German and Allied forces in East Africa was published shortly before the armistice of World War I on 11 November 1918.

Written from the perspective of a woman of British descent, the book recounts the outbreak of war, Allied attacks on Dar es Salaam and other cities, the collapse of German colonial rule, and the author’s efforts in medical relief. It also details her internment by Belgian forces and eventual repatriation to Germany. The memoir offers a gender-specific account of life during the East African campaign. It provides insights into how the wife of the last governor contributed to the narrative of the German Empire and its largest colony during World War I.

Following the publication of her book, Ada Schnee gained attention and gave public talks in post-war Germany propagating German colonial past. Shortly after its publication, more than 3000 copies of her memoir were disseminated by German embassies as tools of propaganda by the Foreign Office of the German Reich.

An English translation was published in 1995, and both the original as well as the translated version have been discussed by scholarly studies of literary and military history. They have mainly focussed on her experiences as a woman writer and the broader implications of her narrative for the German colonial context.

== Background ==
The East African campaign in World War I was a series of battles and guerrilla actions, which started in German East Africa (GEA) and spread to regions of Portuguese Mozambique, Rhodesia, British East Africa, Uganda and the Belgian Congo. German troops under Lieutenant-Colonel Paul von Lettow-Vorbeck fought for the whole of the war. Only after having received official information about the signing of the armistice in Europe two weeks earlier, Lettow-Vorbeck surrendered on 25 November 1918. The governor of German East Africa and Ada Schnee's husband, Heinrich Schnee, did not sign the surrender to signify that Germans did not renounce claims to the colony.

One objective of the German forces in East Africa, led by Lettow-Vorbeck, was to divert Allied forces and supplies from Europe to Africa. By threatening the important British Uganda Railway, Lettow hoped to force Allied troops to invade East Africa, where he could fight a defensive campaign. Accordingly, the German government had formed a defensive strategy for East Africa in which the military would withdraw to the hinterland and fight a guerilla campaign.

== The memoir ==
Completed in July 1918, Schnee's memoir was published just before the armistice of 11 November 1918. Her account of the war in GEA contains both personal experiences as well as a lesser amount of historical events during the campaign. In her foreword, she noted that it was based on her diaries and meant as a testimony of how she and others had "lived, suffered and fought" during the war from 1914 up to 1917. Despite the East Africa campaign's limited significance in the overall context of World War I in Europe, she claimed political, economic, and moral success and "glorious feats on the battle fields." Further, she insisted that Germany should not give up her colonies, if she wants to remain a global power.

In 1995, an English translation was published under the title Bibi Mkuba: My experiences in German East Africa during World War I. Differing from the German original, the English title was preceded by the Swahili honorific ‘Bibi Mkuba’ [sic] – a form of polite address reserved for older or high-ranking women.

== Plot summary ==
=== Chapter 1: Outbreak of the war and early battles ===
Schnee opens her memoir with the news of the outbreak of war reaching German East Africa. In early August 1914, British warships bombard the colonial capital of Dar es Salaam. The German cruiser SMS Königsberg escapes and soon after sinks the British protected cruiser HMS Pegasus off Zanzibar. Almost immediately, the first land battles occur: a British-Indian force attacks Tanga in November 1914, only to be repulsed by German forces, with more than 1,000 casualties on the attacking side; a parallel British attack on Longido also fails.

Schnee describes hearing the first war dispatches and witnessing these naval and land engagements from the governor's headquarters in Dar es Salaam. She notes how governor Heinrich Schnee's planned neutrality was upended by these attacks – in particular by Lieutenant-colonel Paul von Lettow-Vorbeck's aggressive counterattacks – and how her husband as civilian head of the colony's administration and Lettow-Vorbeck as military leader began to clash over strategy. Preparing to take care of sick and wounded soldiers, she organizes extended field hospitals for the Red Cross.

=== Chapter 2: Dar es Salaam under siege and early blockade-runners ===
This chapter recounts the siege of Dar es Salaam and the German attempts to evade the British blockade. Schnee describes a more massive bombardment of Dar es Salaam, including the destruction of the governor’s palace, resulting in her losing all of her personal belongings. She details how German officials improvised to sustain supplies: her husband's administration organized local production and arranged runs through the blockade to bring in food and ammunition. She portrays the mixture of fear and determination in Dar es Salaam’s civilian community – evacuated women and children were assembled inland in Tabora – and how she, as the governor's wife, continues with her relief efforts while her anxiety mounts about cut-off supplies.

=== Chapter 3: Wartime economy and civilian life ===
Chapter 3 focuses on home-front adaptations to war. Schnee records how German settlers and colonial officials are mobilizing the economy: they begin mining local resources such as coal fields, establish mints and printing presses to produce money and organize workshops to make shoes and uniforms. The agricultural research station in Amani helps by producing brandy, quinine and other badly needed medicines both for Germans, Africans and Allied prisoners of war. She notes that colonial women including herself took on extra work, such as running field hospitals, sewing bandages, and caring for refugees from outlying districts. Her account gives examples of life in everyday wartime – shortages of cloth and boots, rationing of food, and the growing presence of Askari (African soldiers) in towns.

=== Chapter 4: Attacks on infrastructure and the Western front ===
In Chapter 4, Schnee writes of intensified military pressure on the colony's infrastructure and the opening of new fronts. German forces under Lettow-Vorbeck carried out raids to disrupt the Uganda Railway and to harass Allied positions. Schnee reports attacks on the rail line and bridges, and how the German garrison in Bukoba on Lake Victoria resists British incursions. On Lake Tanganyika, the German ship Hedwig von Wissmann was destroyed and Kingani captured by an Anglo-Belgian flotilla. She notes with alarm the news of Portugal’s entry into the war in March 1916 and the occupation of the German territory in Kionga by Portuguese colonial forces. Throughout, she questions whether German ammunition and supplies can hold out, as isolated posts are surrounded. She continues to emphasize the civilian angle, writing of handing out basic necessities such as shirts, socks or even toothbrushes made by her group of women, organizing evacuations of schools and hospitals ahead of advancing troops.

=== Chapter 5: The Allied offensive and division of the colony ===
Chapter 5 covers the great Allied offensive of 1916 that effectively split German East Africa. Her narration follows the shock of large Allied columns – British, South African, and Belgian troops – advancing from south and west. Schnee reports of a German officer's account of the Battle of Kahe, as the most terrible experience he ever lived through, with the corpses of Allied soldiers covering the battlefield. She describes the fall of Bismarckburg, an important station on Lake Tanganyika, to the British and the arrival of new German blockade runners bringing scarce supplies and reinforcements. German women continue to care for the sick and wounded in field hospitals and behind the battle lines. Territory changes hands after Allied forces break through the central railway line, severing the colony into eastern and western halves: the once‐secure hinterland towns are taken over by the Allies. By the end of this chapter, Governor Schnee and Lettow-Vorbeck's troops have retreated further inland, and the German civilians rely on Schnee's efforts to keep morale up amidst defeat.

=== Chapter 6: Fall of Tabora and the occupation ===
In Chapter 6, Schnee recounts the next decisive event of the campaign: the capture of Tabora by Belgian forces under General Charles Tombeur on 19 September 1916. She graphically describes the looting and "reign of terror" that follows the fall of the town: Belgian troops pillage German and African property, and Schnee writes of brutal mistreatment and rape of African civilians in the aftermath. She continues to serve as leader of the German civilians in Tabora, with 150 women, 100 children and 300 sick or unfit men having been evacuated there. When Belgian officers want to evict her from her house, she categorically refuses and manages to stay. As the only senior German woman in town, she continues to organize field hospitals and relief and negotiate with the Belgians.

=== Chapter 7: Internment and personal trials ===
In Chapter 7, Schnee's focus shifts towards her personal fate. When the Belgians occupy Tabora, they take Ada and other German women and wounded prisoners into custody. She recounts Christmas behind barbed wire, having most of her personal valuables confiscated by Belgian military authorities. Starting in January 1917, she and other German women and children are allowed to leave for Europe, travelling as prisoners from Tabora onwards through the Belgian Congo. After passing through Stanleyville on a difficult journey overland and further onwards on the Congo river by boat, she arrives in the then-capital Boma, from where she is scheduled to travel on a Belgian troopship to Europe.

=== Chapter 8: Repatriation and return to Europe ===
The final chapter follows Schnee's journey home during the last months of the war. With most of her money having been confiscated, she describes being ferried across submarine-infested seas to Falmouth in Cornwall, and how she is initially confined to a London hotel awaiting exchange. After another sea voyage in Belgian custody, she is held in camps in France and further questioned by the Allies. In September 1917, she is finally released and back in Germany.

== Reception ==
=== Scholarly publications ===
Until the 1980s, studies on the lives and work of women in the former German colonies were neglected compared to those on male actors in colonial contexts. As a result, their gender-specific biographies were only marginally considered in German colonial history. This period was primarily understood and published as the history of white men, portrayed as pioneers, explorers and discoverers, missionaries, traders and occupiers. The prevalent focus was on colonial policy and its justification, as well as on aspects of power, economic and military history. British scholar Dorothy Goldman opined that the literary scholarship of World War I disregarded works by women, even though the literature about this period has been "celebrated for realising the experience of an entire generation." Referring to Schnee's and other women's writings, Goldman stated that women experienced, suffered and wrote about war in a different way from their husbands and other male writers.

In postcolonial studies of the 21st century, Schnee was described as "a cosmopolitan, intelligent and self-confident woman", who refused to correspond to the common gender role of a dependent spouse. A 2010 article discussing gender relations among former German colonialists and revisionist colonial attitudes in the Weimar Republic included references to Schnee's writings and public appearance. In a 2017 biography about her husband, she was said to have strongly supported him in his official role, including in practical ways. As he was a poor public speaker, and she a trained actress, she could help him with his breathing technique, articulation and rhetorical skills. In his memoirs, Heinrich Schnee wrote about how much he relied on his wife's advice, and her influence was recorded as significant in his German East African policies. Another study noted her central message that German women were patriotic and able to protect themselves, even without the presence of their husbands. This was exemplified by how she stood up to British and Belgian officials by simply ignoring their orders.

Apart from Schnee's reports of German achievements and bravery, scholars have noted that she also expressed desillusionment of the war that invalidated the European claim of bringing peace to Africa. For example, she referred to African Christians “to whom we, whether as British, German or French missionaries taught the lesson of brotherly love, and now the Whites slaughter each other." In a German historical account of the "myth and reality" of Lettow-Vorbeck's military campaign, Schnee's memoir was cited commenting on the hardships suffered by the native population. For example, she had written about punitive expeditions and that the Maasai, contrary to other ethnic groups, actively had opposed German rule.

With regard to the fate of German civilians, her description of brutal and arbitrary treatment was noted. Referring to her fear of sexual aggression, she was described mentioning that indigenous soldiers from the Belgian Congo had raped African women, while German women were spared such violence. A 2001 PhD thesis on the East African campaign called Schnee's memoir "a less traditional source for military history, but nonetheless a useful one [...] as it gives a clear picture, but also focuses on the economic and medical systems that underlay the fighting force." Among other references to Schnee's book, the 2007 study Tip and run: the untold tragedy of the Great War in Africa quoted her view of how Africans were treated by the German in comparison to the British administration: "[...] she wrote that the ‘weak point of British administration ‘is that it gives in to the natives too much. Because of this they become insolent and lazy which is not permitted under German doctrine’." This statement was contrasted in the same study saying that an estimated 300,000 African civilians lost their lives due to German scorched earth policies.

=== Archives ===
The German Federal Archives hold a copy of her memoir as part of propaganda publications from the Reich's Foreign Office. In November 1918, the Foreign Office ordered more than 3000 copies to be sent to German embassies in Bern, The Hague, Stockholm and Copenhagen. In order to counter British allegations, the embassies were instructed to disseminate the book to all neutral states to "prove that the Germans are indeed capable of fostering a positive colonial spirit." Copies are also held by more than 60 scientific libraries, mainly in Germany and other European countries, but also by the Library of Congress and universities in the US and Canada. The English translation has been collected by 30 scientific libraries.

== Editions ==
- Meine Erlebnisse während der Kriegszeit in Deutsch-Ostafrika. Leipzig, Quelle & Meyer, 1918. (in German) English translation: Bibi Mkuba: My Experiences in German East Africa during World War I. San Bernardino, California: Borgu Press, 1995, ISBN 9780893703196.
