= Ada Schnee =

German author (1872–1969)

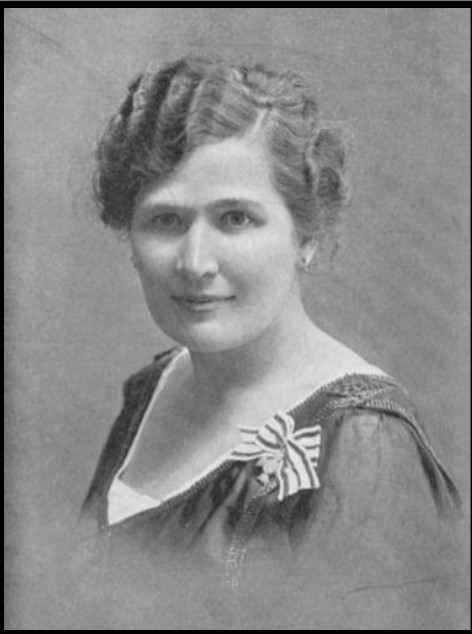
- Schnee, c. 1918
- Born: Ada Adeline Woodhill; 17 October 1872; Naseby, Colony of New Zealand
- Died: 11 May 1969 (aged 96); West Berlin
- Other name: Bibi Mkubwa (in Swahili)
- Citizenship: United Kingdom; Germany
- Occupations: Actress and author
- Years active: 1918–1964
- Known for: Memoir of her life in German East Africa
- Notable work: Bibi Mkuba: My Experiences in German East Africa during World War I
- Spouse: Heinrich Schnee (m. 1901; died 1949)

Ada Adeline Schnee (née Woodhill; 17 October 1872 – 11 May 1969) was a naturalized German writer and former actress, born to British parents in New Zealand. Her autobiographical writings about life in German East Africa as the wife of the last German governor, Heinrich Schnee, were published in 1918. In her memoir, Schnee recounts her firsthand observations of the East African campaign of World War I and reflects on her experience being treated as a female enemy alien due to her nationality.

Following the publication of her memoir, Ada Schnee gained public attention in post-war Germany, where she delivered lectures on her experiences during Germany's colonial past. An English translation appeared in 1995. Both the German original and its translation have been the subject of scholarly analysis – particularly in literary and military-historical studies – examining Schnee's perspective as a woman writer and the wider implications of her narrative for the German colonial context. Postcolonial studies have also noted her reports on human suffering in the war, including gender-related violence.

== Biography ==
=== Early life ===
Ada Schnee was born Ada Adeline Woodhill in 1872 in Naseby, New Zealand, to an English father and an Irish mother. In 1879, her family moved to Sydney, Australia, where she later started a career as a theatre actress. In October 1900, she left Sydney by boat, looking for engagements in the US. On a steamer heading to San Francisco, she became acquainted with the 29-year-old German colonial official Heinrich Schnee (1871–1949), who had just spent two years in German New Guinea.

At their reunion the following year, they married in New York City on 7 November 1901. The couple spent their honeymoon travelling westwards across the US and finally arrived in German Samoa, where Heinrich Schnee began his appointment as deputy governor.

=== Married life ===
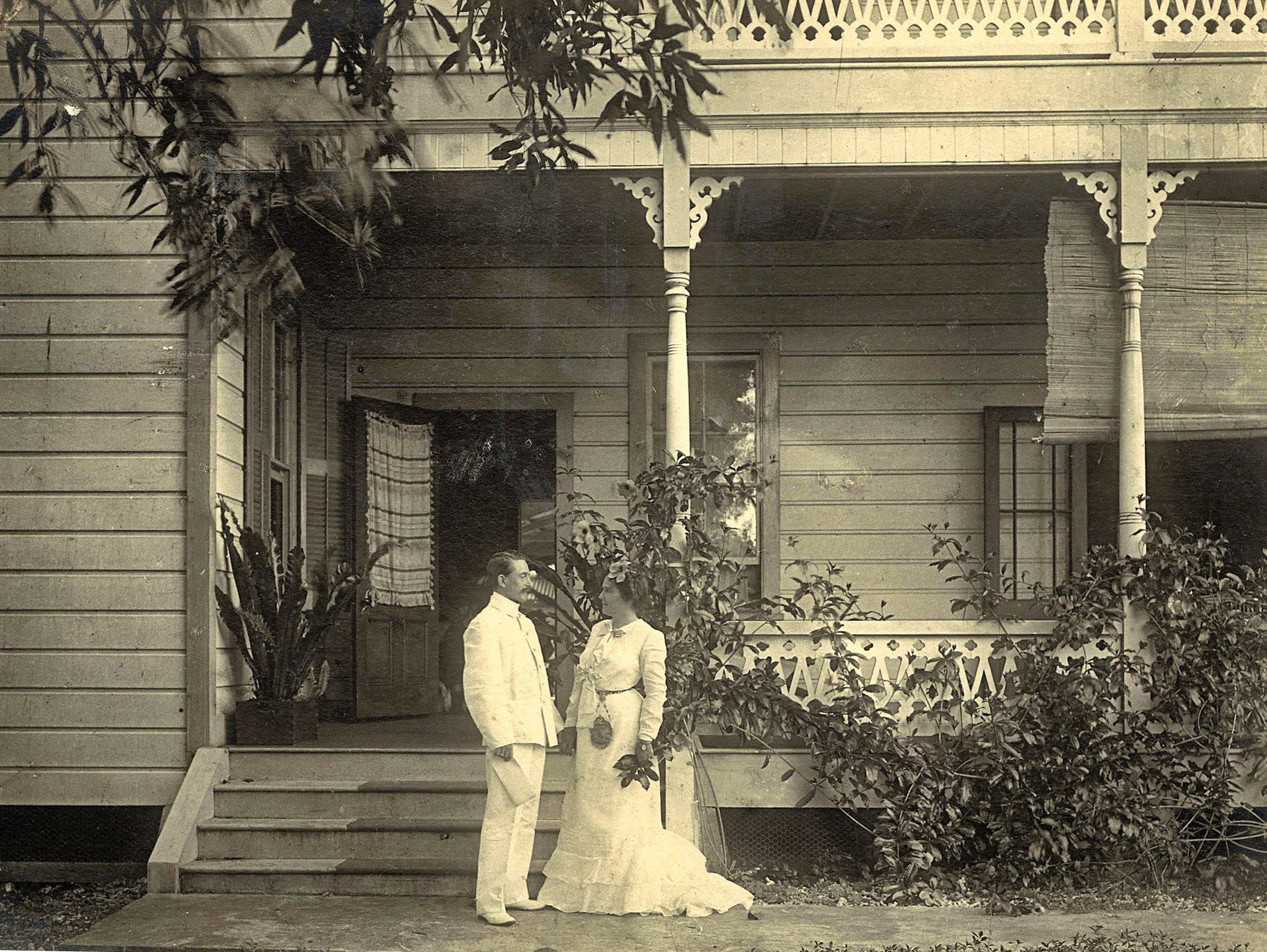
Heinrich and Ada Schnee in Apia, Samoa, 1902

After Samoa, Heinrich Schnee served in diplomatic positions in London and Berlin, and in 1912 was appointed governor of German East Africa (GEA). Unlike his predecessors in this office, Schnee was not an aristocrat and military officer, but a middle-class academic. Further, he was accompanied by his wife of New Zealand origin, and the couple set up a bourgeois household, including a grand piano specifically adapted to tropical conditions.

In Schnee's first two years of service, the colony was developed through the completion of the central railway line between Lake Tanganyika and Dar es Salaam on the east coast, advances in public and animal health, as well as improved relations between settlers and the colonial administration. During some of his official activities, Ada Schnee accompanied her husband, for example on visits to the German communities in Tanga and other northern regions of the country in December 1913.

=== World War I ===
When World War I broke out in August 1914 and German and British troops were fighting the East African campaign, Ada Schnee was in a difficult position. Born and raised in New Zealand and Australia, she was proud of her British background. Nevertheless, she was loyal to her husband and decided to support the German side. As an assertive British woman who advised her husband in full confidence, she was met with resentment by the conservatives in the German colony. This was particularly true of the military officers closest to the Schutztruppe commander, Paul von Lettow-Vorbeck. Heinrich Schnee's deputy, Wilhelm Methner, later wrote about her predicament during the war:

The wife of the governor, who was English by birth, suffered the bitter fate of seeing the sons of her fatherland and of her adoptive country in battle against each other. This brave and upright woman had to bear with much hostility.

— Wilhelm Methner, Unter drei Gouverneuren: 16 Jahre Dienst in deutschen Tropen

As governor, her husband moved with the German troops during the campaign, but was overshadowed by Lettow-Vorbeck. In the absence of her husband, Schnee assumed a leading role for German civilians. When Allied forces from the Belgian Congo captured the inland town of Tabora in September 1916, Schnee – together with approximately 140 other German women and children – was interned as a civilian prisoner. Most of those interned were later evacuated to camps within the Belgian Congo. Subsequently, Schnee and others were transported by ship to France, turned over to British authorities, and ultimately repatriated to Germany in September 1917.

== Memoir ==
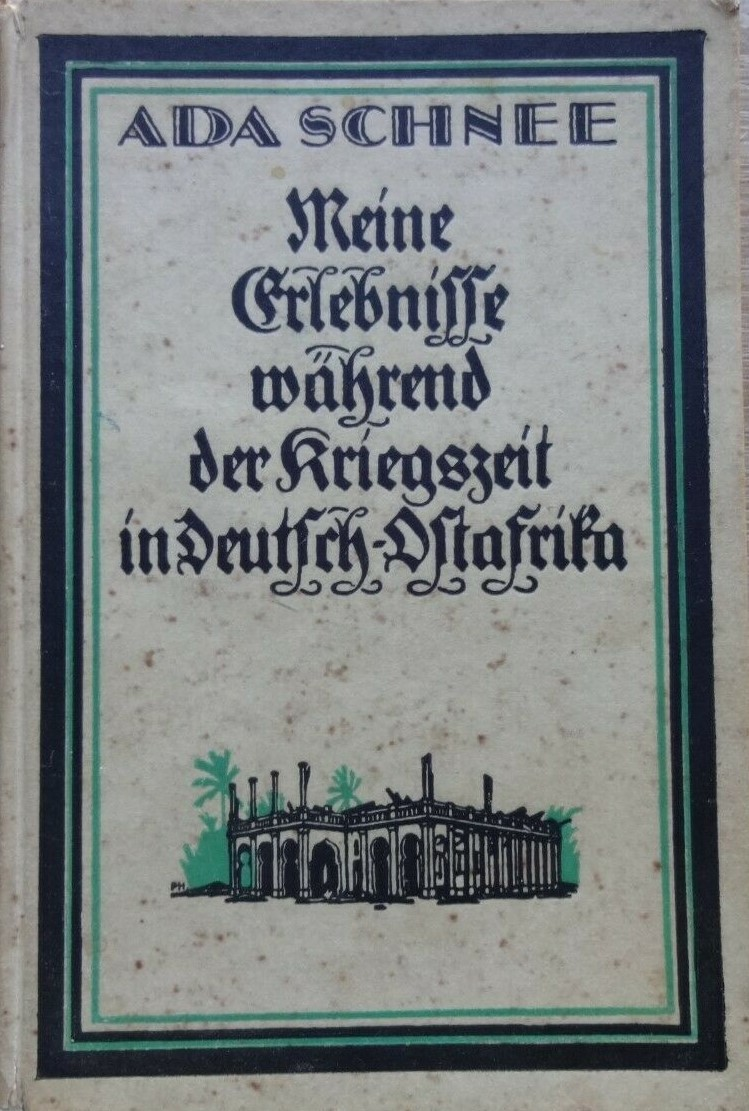
Schnee's memoir, Meine Erlebnisse während der Kriegszeit in Deutsch-Ostafrika, 1918

Completed in July 1918, Ada Schnee's memoir was published just before the armistice of 11 November 1918. An English translation published in 1995 was titled Bibi Mkuba: My experiences in German East Africa during World War I. Differing from the German original, the English title was preceded by the Swahili honorific Bibi Mkuba – a form of address reserved for older or high-ranking women.

Schnee's memoir recounts her experiences as the wife of the GEA governor during the war. In less than 200 pages, she describes the outbreak of war, British attacks on Dar es Salaam, and tensions between civilian and military leadership. As Allied offensives intensified, she provides detailed information about the collapse of the colonial administration, civilian hardships, and her efforts organizing medical and relief work. Following the fall of Tabora, Schnee recounts how she was interned by Belgian forces and later repatriated to Germany via the Belgian Congo, the United Kingdom and France.

In her preface, she wrote in retrospect: "If Germany wants to remain a world power, then she cannot forgo the colonies. It has been proved that possession of German East Africa is necessary."

=== Later life in Germany ===
Following the publication of her memoir, Ada Schnee became known as an eyewitness of German colonial rule and the East African campaign. Already in August 1918, Schnee published an article for the German Colonial Society, claiming that the German colony had educated the native African population in government schools and "lifted them out of their primitive original state." In the following years, she was invited to speak about her colonial experience as a German woman, for example at the Women's Welfare Association (Verein Frauenwohl), an organization that continued to promote Germany's colonial past. In the 1930s, she gave further talks as chairperson of the women's section of the Association of Germans Living Abroad (Bund der Auslandsdeutschen) in Berlin.

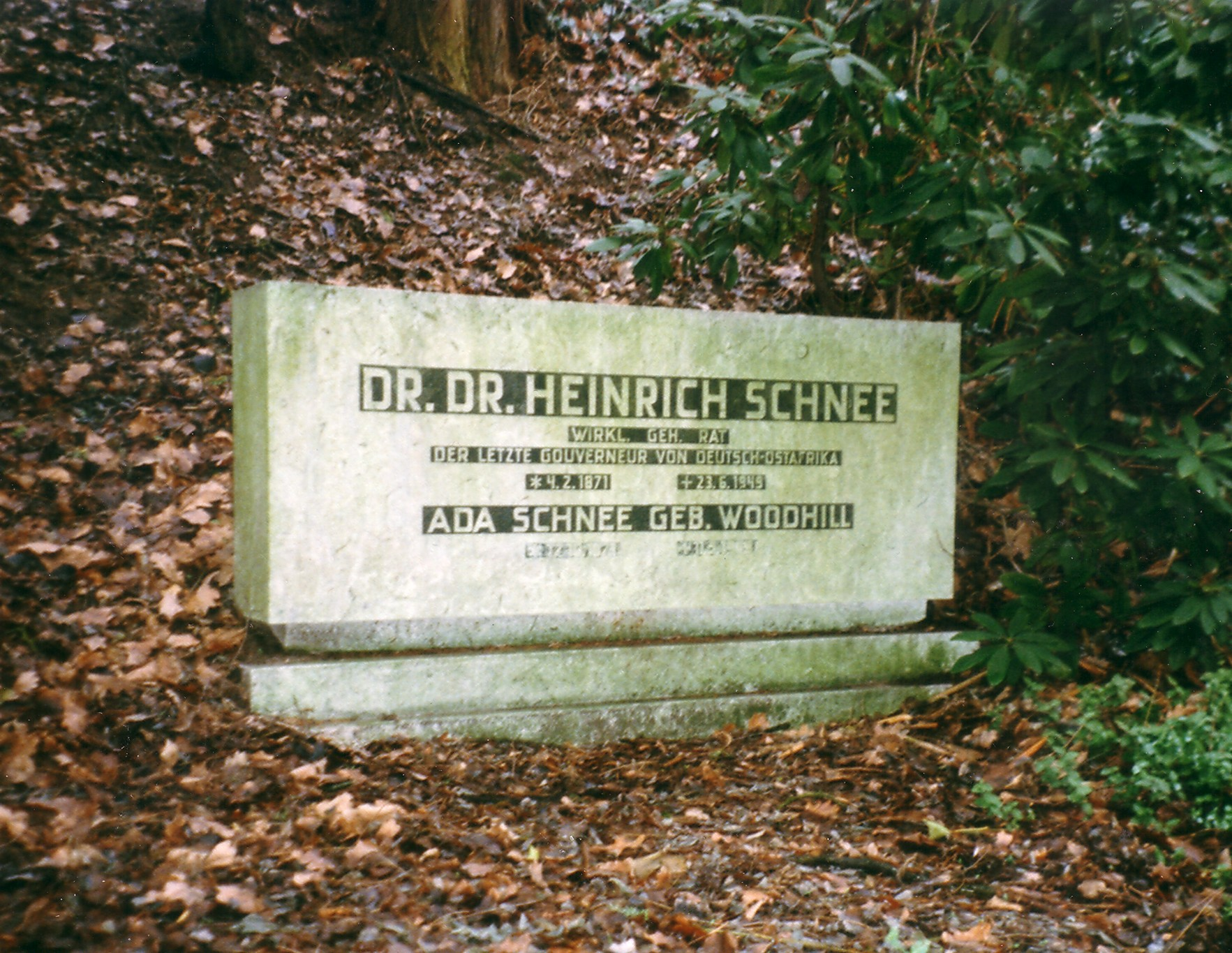
Gravestone of Heinrich and Ada Schnee, Heerstraße cemetery, Berlin

During the 1920s and 1930s, Heinrich Schnee was a long-serving member of the Reichstag, first during the Weimar Republic and, having joined the Nazi party in 1933, in the Reichstag of Nazi Germany. After World War II, the Allies considered Schnee incriminated, because he was a Nazi party member. During his retirement, he had a car accident from which he died in West Berlin in 1949.

=== Final years ===
In 1964, Ada Schnee edited her late husband's memoir about his years as last governor in GEA, titled Als letzter Gouverneur in Deutsch-Ostafrika – Erinnerungen. She died aged 96 on 11 May 1969 in West Berlin, and was buried next to her husband in the Heerstraße cemetery.

== Reception ==
=== Scholarly publications ===
Until the 1980s, studies on the lives and work of women in the former German colonies were neglected compared to those on men in colonial contexts. As a result, biographies written by women were only marginally considered in German colonial history. This period was primarily understood and published in Germany as the history of white men, as explorers, soldiers, missionaries and traders. The prevalent focus was on colonial policy and its justification, as well as on aspects of power, economic and military history. Published in 2010, an encyclopedia of German-language autobiographies by 2000 women authors born in the 19th century included an entry about Schnee.

British scholar Dorothy Goldman opined that the literary scholarship of World War I disregarded works by women, even though literature about the war has been "celebrated for realising the experience of an entire generation." Referring to Schnee's and other women's writings, Goldman stated that women experienced, suffered and wrote about war in a different way than their husbands and other male writers.

In postcolonial studies of the 21st century, Schnee has been described as "a cosmopolitan, intelligent and self-confident woman", who refused to correspond to the common gender role of dependent spouse. In a 2017 biography of her husband, she was said to have strongly supported him in his official role, including in practical ways. As he was a poor public speaker, and she a trained actress, she helped him with his breathing technique, articulation and rhetorical skills. In his memoirs, Heinrich Schnee is said to have written about how much he relied on his wife's advice, and her influence was recorded as significant in his GEA policies. Another study noted her central message that German women were patriotic and able to protect themselves, even without the presence of their husbands. This was exemplified by how she stood up to British and Belgian officials by simply ignoring their orders.

Apart from Ada Schnee's reports of German achievements and bravery, scholars have noted that she also expressed disillusionment of the war that invalidated the European claim of bringing peace to Africa. For example, she referred to African Christians "to whom we, whether as British, German or French missionaries taught the lesson of brotherly love, and now the whites slaughter each other."

Regarding the fate of German civilians, her description of brutal and arbitrary treatment was noted. Referring to her fear of sexual aggression, she was described mentioning that indigenous soldiers from the Belgian Congo had raped African women, while German women were spared such violence. In a German historical account of the "myth and reality" of Lettow-Vorbeck's military campaign, Ada Schnee's memoir was cited commenting on the devastating effects of the war on the African population. As an example, she had written about punitive expeditions and that the Maasai, contrary to other ethnic groups, had actively opposed German rule. She was quoted saying that "the whites should be deeply ashamed of these unprecedented crimes for all time."

A 1999 article published by the Military Historical Society of Australia about Australians in German East Africa quoted the wartime memoir of British General C. P. Fendall with a description of Ada Schnee's reaction to the British Navy having destroyed the governor's palace in Dar es Salaam with all her personal belongings on 30 November 1914:

The Governor's wife, a native of Australia or New Zealand, was indignant at the destruction of her home, and as General Wahle, in his diary, says that she was so angry that she said she would never have anything more to do with the English. She kept her word, for when taken prisoner by the Belgians on their occupation of Tabora, she was sent, at her own request to Germany, in exchange for some Belgian women then in German hands.

— Charles Pears Fendall, The East African Force 1915–1919

A 2001 PhD thesis on WWI in East Africa called Ada Schnee's memoir "a less traditional source for military history, but nonetheless a useful one ... as it gives a clear picture, but also focuses on the economic and medical systems that underlay the fighting force." Among other references to Schnee's book, the 2007 study Tip and run: the untold tragedy of the Great War in Africa quoted her view of how Africans were treated by Germans in comparison to the British administration: "... she wrote that the 'weak point of British administration is that it gives in to the natives too much. Because of this they become insolent and lazy which is not permitted under German doctrine'." This statement was contrasted in the same study saying that an estimated 300,000 African civilians lost their lives because of the German scorched earth policy.

Referring to Heinrich Schnee's later role as a deputy for the Nazi Party, US historian Lewis H. Gann wrote that Schnee was disrespected by the Nazis and that

(...) his 'denazification file', compiled for the Allied Commission for Denazification in 1947, contains a number of genuinely moving letters from opponents of the regime who certified that he and his wife had assisted them and had taken some risk in so doing.

— Lewis H. Gann, "Heinrich Schnee (1871–1949)",

=== Archives ===
The German Historical Museum and the German Federal Archives hold copies of her memoir as part of propaganda publications from the Reich's Foreign Office. In November 1918, the Foreign Office had ordered more than 3000 copies to be sent to German embassies in Bern, The Hague, Stockholm and Copenhagen. In order to counter British allegations, the embassies were instructed to disseminate the book to all neutral states to "prove that the Germans are indeed capable of fostering a positive colonial spirit." Copies of the German original edition are also held by more than 60 scientific libraries, mainly in Germany and other European countries, but also by the Library of Congress and universities in the US and Canada. The English translation has been collected by 30 scientific libraries.

The Prussian Privy State Archives in Berlin hold personal correspondence and notes about her travels and historical events from 1896 to 1951, as well as a 2-metre oil painting of Ada Schnee.

=== Fiction ===
A literary rendering of Ada Schnee in German East Africa is part of the novel A Matter of Time by Swiss writer Alex Capus. Further, she appears as a character in the 2015 novel The Ghosts of Africa by Canadian author William Stevenson. As Ada Schnee had written about her experiences as big game hunter and owner of a tame lioness, she was also featured in a German non-fiction book about "legendary big game hunters" in Africa.

== Works ==
- Meine Erlebnisse während der Kriegszeit in Deutsch-Ostafrika. Leipzig, Quelle & Meyer, 1918. (in German) English translation: Bibi Mkuba: My Experiences in German East Africa during World War I. San Bernardino, California: Borgu Press, 1995, ISBN 9780893703196.
- "Ostafrikanisches Wirtschaftsleben im Kriege." [East African economic life during war], Koloniale Rundschau, 1918, pp. 9–25. (in German)
- Heinrich Schnee. Als letzter Gouverneur in Deutsch-Ostafrika – Erinnerungen, edited and with an introduction by Ada Schnee. Heidelberg, Quelle & Meyer, 1964. (in German). English translation: The Last Governor of German East Africa. 2020.

== See also ==
- Causes of World War I
- Women in World War I
- Treaty of Versailles
