= William Denis Battershill =

British colonial administrator

Sir William Denis Battershill KCMG
- Battershill in 1939

7th Governor of Tanganyika
- In office 28 April 1945 – 18 June 1949
- Monarch: George VI
- Preceded by: Sir Wilfrid Edward Francis Jackson
- Succeeded by: Sir Edward Francis Twining

5th Governor of Cyprus
- In office 4 July 1939 – 3 October 1941
- Monarch: George VI
- Preceded by: Sir Herbert Richmond Palmer
- Succeeded by: Charles Campbell Woolley

Personal details
- Born: 29 June 1896
- Died: 11 August 1959 (aged 63) British Cyprus
- Citizenship: British
- Spouse(s): Joan Gellibrand (m. 1924)
- Children: 2
- Education: King's School, Worcester
- Profession: colonial administrator, diplomat

Military service
- Allegiance: British Empire
- Branch/service: British Indian Army
- Years of service: 1914–1919
- Unit: East Surrey Regiment; Queen's Own Royal West Kent Regiment
- Battles/wars: Mesopotamian campaign

Sir William Denis Battershill KCMG (29 June 1896 – 11 August 1959) was a British colonial administrator. He was Governor of Cyprus from 1939 to 1941 and Governor of Tanganyika from 1945 to 1949.

== Early life and education ==
William Denis Battershill was born in Camborne, in 1896, to W.J. Battershill. He was educated at King's School, Worcester. He served in the military from 1914 to 1919.

== Career ==
Battershill joined the Ceylon Civil Service as a cadet in 1920. He was appointed assistant colonial secretary of Jamaica in 1929.

Battershill served as Colonial Secretary of Cyprus under Governor Richmond Palmer from 1935 to 1937, and served as governor of British Cyprus from 1939 to 1941. Municipal elections were slated to be reintroduced in Cyprus in June 1941, but were postponed following the German invasion of Greece in 1940.

Battershill replaced John Hathorn Hall as Chief Secretary of the Palestine Government in 1937. Battershill became acting High Commissioner when Arthur Wauchope went on leave in September 1937. Acting district commissioner for the Galilee Lewis Yelland Andrews was assassinated on 27 September 1937, and Battershill dissolved the National Defense Party and the Arab Higher Committee (AHC) in response. Hussein Khalidi and three other AHC members were deported to the Seychelles.

Battershill was made Assistant Under-Secretary of State for the Colonies in 1941, and Deputy Under-Secretary of State for the Colonies in 1942. The Colonial Office formed a committee in September 1942 to determine what could be learned following the British losses of Malaya and Hong Kong to Japan; Battershill chaired the committee.

From 1945 to 1949, Battershill served as governor of Trinidad and Tobago.

== Personal life ==
Battershill married the daughter of John Gellibrand and had two children. Battershill was appointed to the Order of St Michael and St George (CMG) in 1938, and promoted to KCMG in 1941. He died in Kyrenia, Cyprus, in August 1959.

== Works cited ==
=== Books ===
- Hill, George (1972). A History of Cyprus: The Ottoman Province, The British Colony, 1571-1948. Vol. 4. Cambridge University Press. ISBN 0521052629.
- Long, C. (2019). The Palestinians and British Perfidy: The Tragic Aftermath of the Balfour Declaration of 1917. Liverpool University Press. ISBN 9781845198961.
- Ure, Gavin (2012). Governors, Politics and The Colonial Office: Public Policy in Hong Kong, 1918. Hong Kong University Press. ISBN 9789882208834.

=== Journals ===
- Cahill, Richard (2018). "Sir Charles Tegart: The "Counterterrorism Expert" in Palestine" (PDF). Jerusalem Quarterly (74). Institute of Jerusalem Studies: 57–66.
- Rappas, Alexis (2008). "The Elusive Polity: Imagining and Contesting Colonial Authority in Cyprus during the 1930s". Journal of Modern Greek Studies. 26 (2). Johns Hopkins University Press: 363–397.

=== News ===
- "Battershill, New Palestine Secretary, Reports for Duty". Jewish Telegraphic Agency. 2 May 1937. Archived from the original on 3 November 2026.
- "Death of Eminent Cornishman". The West Briton. 20 August 1959. p. 10 – via British Newspaper Archive.
