= Francis Graeme Tyrrell =

British colonial administrator

Sir Francis Graeme Tyrrell KBE CMG

Acting Governor of British Ceylon
- In office 20 September 1933 – 23 December 1933
- Monarch: George V
- Preceded by: Graeme Thomson
- Succeeded by: Reginald Edward Stubbs

Personal details
- Born: 1876
- Died: 1964 (aged 87–88)

Sir Francis Graeme Tyrrell KBE CMG (1876–1964) was a British colonial administrator. A son of Lieutenant-General Francis Hardinge Tyrrell of the Indian Army, he was the Colonial Secretary of Ceylon and served as an acting Governor of British Ceylon. He was appointed on 20 September 1933 and was acting Governor until 23 December 1933. He was succeeded by Reginald Edward Stubbs.

He was created a Companion of the Order of St Michael and St George in the 1928 New Year Honours while serving as the Controller of Revenue in Ceylon and Knight Commander of the Order of the British Empire in the 1934 New Year Honours while serving as the Colonial Secretary of Ceylon. His sister Beatrix Maud was the wife of John Jamieson Willis, Bishop of Uganda.

Government offices
Preceded by Graeme Thomson	acting Governor of British Ceylon; 1933-1933	Succeeded by Reginald Edward Stubbs
