= Horace Byatt =

British colonial governor (1875-1933)

Sir Horace Byatt GCMG
- Sir Horace (Archer) Byatt by Bassano. Whole-plate glass negative, 15 August 1922

Commissioner of British Somaliland
- In office July 1911 – 1914
- Preceded by: William Henry Manning
- Succeeded by: Geoffrey Francis Archer

Governor of Tanganyika
- In office 22 July 1920 – 20 July 1922
- Preceded by: Heinrich Schnee (German East Africa)
- Succeeded by: Donald Cameron

Governor of Trinidad and Tobago
- In office 22 November 1924 – 1929
- Preceded by: Samuel Herbert Wilson
- Succeeded by: Alfred Claud Hollis

Personal details
- Born: 22 March 1875 Tottenham, Middlesex, England
- Died: 8 April 1933 (aged 58) London, England
- Spouse: Olga Margaret Campbell

Sir Horace Archer Byatt GCMG (22 March 1875 – 8 April 1933) was a British colonial governor. In the early part of his career he served in Nyasaland, British Somaliland, Gibraltar and Malta. Later, he served in British East Africa, becoming the first governor of the British mandate of Tanganyika. He was then the governor of Trinidad and Tobago.

== Biography ==
Byatt was born on 22 March 1875 in Tottenham, Middlesex to schoolmaster Horace Byatt M.A., of Midhurst, Sussex (where he was taught by H. G. Wells at Midhurst Grammar School), and Laura (née Archer). He attended Lincoln College, Oxford, obtaining a Bachelor of Arts degree in 1898. Following university, he began a career in the Colonial Service. In 1898 he began working in Nyasaland (what is now Malawi), and in 1905, he went to British Somaliland. He was appointed commissioner and commander-in-chief of British Somaliland in 1911, serving until 1914, when he became Colonial Secretary in Gibraltar. From 1914 to 1916 he was lieutenant-governor and Colonial Secretary of Malta.

From 1916 he was an administrator in British East Africa, and in 1920 he became the first governor of the new British mandate of Tanganyika. In Tanganyika he was responsible for the transfer of power between the Germans and the British, following World War I. Byatt was noted as a liberal governor with sympathies towards African interests. He was given instructions that the territory was to be governed "in the interests of the Africans" and he was said to have "really taken those instructions to heart." As a result of this his administration gained a reputation for being humane. Byatt would not enforce any rule in the territory that he did not believe was helpful to the territory's African majority, nor would he allow "any non-African interest" to take precedence over that of the territory's African population. After a French visitor, Pierre Marbois, "carelessly" ignored the advice of a guide and was mauled by a leopard in front of Byatt, Byatt "always took care to be cautious around wildlife." Byatt was also said to be "very fond of watching the elephants," though he did not hunt them, he merely liked to observe them. He was also governor and commander in chief of Trinidad and Tobago between 1924 and 1929.

=== Personal life ===
He married Olga Margaret Campbell of Argyll in 1924 and they had three sons:

- Sir Hugh Campbell Byatt KCVO CMG (1927–2011), British ambassador to Angola and Portugal
- Ronald (Robin) Archer Campbell Byatt CMG (1930–2019), British diplomat, High Commissioner in Zimbabwe and New Zealand, Ambassador to Morocco
- David Byatt (born 1932)

Byatt died on 8 April 1933 in London, aged 58.

Byatt's bush squirrel (Paraxerus vexillarius var. byatti), a rodent endemic to Tanzania, was named after Byatt.
