= Graeme Thomson =

British civil servant

Sir Graeme Thomson GCMG KCB

26th Governor of British Ceylon
- In office 11 April 1931 – 20 September 1933
- Monarch: George V
- Preceded by: Bernard Henry Bourdillon (Acting governor)
- Succeeded by: Francis Graeme Tyrrell (Acting governor)

Governor of Nigeria
- In office 13 November 1925 – 17 June 1931
- Preceded by: Hugh Clifford
- Succeeded by: Donald Charles Cameron

Governor of British Guiana
- In office 4 April 1923 – 31 August 1925
- Monarch: George V
- Preceded by: Wilfred Collet
- Succeeded by: Cecil Hunter-Rodwell

Personal details
- Born: 9 August 1875
- Died: 28 September 1933 (aged 58) Aden
- Citizenship: British

Sir Graeme Thomson GCMG KCB (9 August 1875 – 28 September 1933) was a British civil servant in the Admiralty, who served as a colonial civil servant and then governor in several British colonies.

== Admiralty clerk ==
Graeme Thomson was educated at Winchester and New College, Oxford and joined the civil service in 1900, being assigned to the Admiralty.

== Director of Transports ==
Shortly after the outbreak of war, he received extremely rapid promotion, from a superintending clerk to Civil Assistant Director of Transport in September 1914 and to Director of Transports at the Admiralty in December, succeeding Admiral Savory.

Winston Churchill praised him after stating over a million troops had been moved:

The credit for these arrangements lies very largely with the head of the Admiralty Transport Department, Mr. Graeme Thomson—one of the discoveries of the War, a man who has stepped into the place when the emergency came, who has formed, organised, and presided over performances and transactions the like of which were never contemplated by any State in history. Indeed, so smoothly and unfailingly has this vast business, the like of which has not been previously witnessed, been carried through, that we have several times been compelled to remind the soldiers whom we serve, and I now think it right to remind the House, that, after all, we are at war.

The Adelaide Advertiser described him in 1915 as:

A tall, soldierly-looking man with the face of a diplomat, the forehead of a thinker, a square chin, and a bushy moustache, Mr. Thomson's appearance conveys the impression of a rare combination of organising ability, accuracy, judgment, resource, and rapid assimilation of ideas.

In 1917, the Directorate of Shipping for the Ministry of Shipping and Admiralty was created and Thomson was placed in charge of it.

== Colonial Service ==
After the war government involvement in shipping declined and his post was abolished. He then joined the Colonial Service, being appointed as Colonial Secretary of Ceylon in 1919, then Governor of British Guiana in 1922 and of Governor of Nigeria in 1925, and finally of Governor of Ceylon in 1931. He died at Aden on his way home from there.

He had been appointed Knight Grand Cross of the Order of St Michael and St George in the 1928 New Year Honours.

Government offices
Preceded by Bernard Henry Bourdillon acting governor	Governor of British Ceylon; 1931–1933	Succeeded by Francis Graeme Tyrrell acting governor
Preceded by Wilfred Collet	Governors of British Guiana; 1923–1925	Succeeded by Cecil Hunter-Rodwell
Preceded by Hugh Clifford	Governors of Nigeria; 1925–1931	Succeeded by Donald Charles Cameron
