= Uhuru Design =

Coordinates: 40.677518°N 74.018462°W

- Company type: Private
- Industry: Furniture Design
- Founded: 2004 Brooklyn, New York, United States
- Headquarters: Red Hook, Brooklyn United States
- Products: Sustainable Furniture

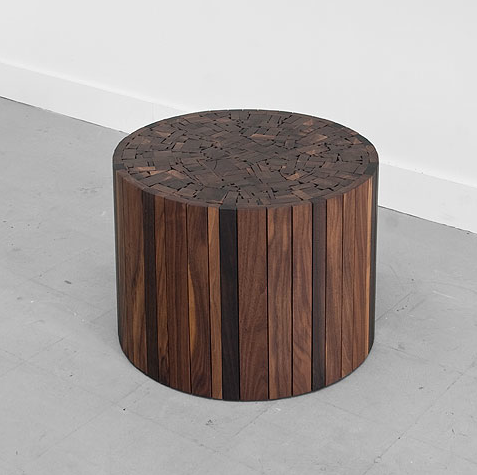
Uhuru's Original Design: "Stoolen" (designed 2004)

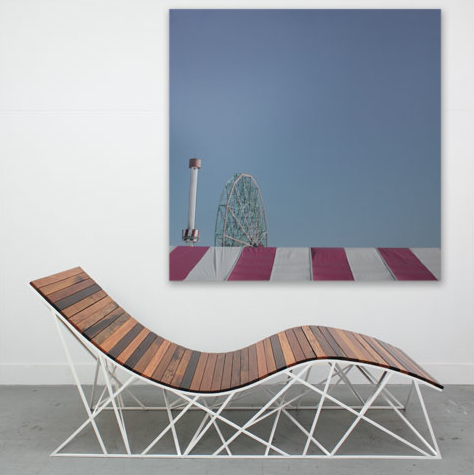
Uhuru's Coney Island Inspired "Cyclone Lounger" (designed 2010)

Uhuru Design is a Brooklyn-based design and build sustainable furniture company known for its reuse of used materials. Founded in 2004 by Rhode Island School of Design (RISD) graduates Jason Horvath and Bill Hilgendorf, Uhuru's acclaimed material reuse projects includes reclaiming and hand-working wood from the Coney Island Boardwalk and Kentucky bourbon distilleries, as well as upcycling found materials.

In 2011, Uhuru partnered with sustainability entrepreneur Daniel Husserl to grow the company's international presence, production capabilities and interior design division. Prior to joining Uhuru, Daniel was co-founder at furniture company Aellon and founder at sustainability strategy firm NaturalProgression.

Uhuru has work in the Renwick Gallery of the Smithsonian Institution and the Brooklyn Museum of Art, and featured in the Milwaukee Art Museum, A+D Museum in Los Angeles, and the New Museum in New York City.

Uhuru builds each piece by hand in their Brooklyn workshop and has a showroom at the same location. Uhuru has collaborated with designers and architects worldwide, as well as artists such as Maya Lin for the Cooper–Hewitt and Dan Colen at the Gagosian Gallery.
