= Uhuru Mobile =

Android-based secure operating system

- Original author: Teclib'
- Developer: Teclib' Expert
- Stable release: 1.0
- Written in: Apache 2.0 & GNU GPLv2 (for the Android basis and kernel developments) – Proprietary for other Uhuru developments Platform: Android Devices
- Type: Security-focused operating system
- License: GNU GPLv2 Kernel & Proprietary software
- Website: Uhuru Mobile

Uhuru Mobile is a secure Android-based operating system.

An operating system is the principal program allowing Smartphones, Tablets and PCs to run. This central tool connects and coordinates all the components such as kernel, computers programs, software or device drivers, letting users managing their devices.

Uhuru Mobile is a solution composed with its application encryption market, a modified Android-based OS, a virtual private network and a SMS encryption solution.

The purpose of Uhuru Mobile is to prevent physical attacks.

== History ==
The name Uhuru comes from the Swahili language and means freedom and independence.

Uhuru Mobile is the result of a research and development project initiated in 2012 to promote digital sovereignty.

As an Android-based operating system, Uhuru Mobile focuses on security and privacy for end-users, individuals or businesses, on mobile devices.

The operating system is currently developed by a software Editor company called Teclib’.

== Software Overview ==
=== Multi-layers Protection ===
- Kernel: The system core is protected against malicious or unknown code as well as physical attacks or access.
- System protection: Critical resources are dynamically protected from malware and vulnerability exploits ensuring the integrity of the operating system’s components.
- Data protection: User’s data on the device are encrypted. User’s authentication resources are protected by using certificates.
- Application protection: The applications that can be installed on the device are exclusively coming from a market of certified applications. All those applications are validated and certificated before being available within the Uhuru applications market.

=== Additional Features ===
To ensure the OS protection and security while using applications, a dedicated market has been installed (replacing the Google Play Store). Uhuru Mobile’s applications market only provides apps approved and certified by a team of security experts. Companies can also customize the Uhuru marketplace providing their in-house applications.

Uhuru mobile is provided with a deception system, sending fake GPS location coordinates to applications. This decoy geolocation tool allows users to fool some applications using geolocation. IT administrators can define the redirecting coordinates. For example in the demo version, the NSA headquarters coordinates were sent by the deception system.

A mobile device management tool for the administration of mobile devices is provided without any additional setup. IT administrators have access to a web-console in order to manage the Uhuru Mobile fleet and all linked applications (such as the remote apps installation/suppression or the set up of user accounts).

== See also ==
- Operating system
- Mobile device management
- Security-focused operating system

== Bibliography ==
- Eudes, Yves (2015), Uhuru, le smartphone sécurisé " made in France " (article) (in French), Lemonde.fr.
- Leo (2014), Uhuru, le nouvel OS sécurisé basé sur Android arrivera en avril prochain (article) (in French), FrAndroid.
- Sayer, Peter (2014), Nov'IT pitches rooted Android phones as a pro-privacy weapon (article), PCWorld.
- LE CHALLENGE DE HACKING DAVFI/ANDROID - UHURU MOBILE CONFORTE LE SAVOIR-FAIRE DE SES CRÉATEURS (article) (in French), AL'X Communication, 2014, archived from the original on 2016-09-19.
- Massolin, Francis (2014), A secure Mobile made in France (article), FOJproject, archived from the original on 2016-08-11.
