= List of governors of Tanganyika =

Governor of Tanganyika
- Flag of the Governor of Tanganyika (1923–1961)

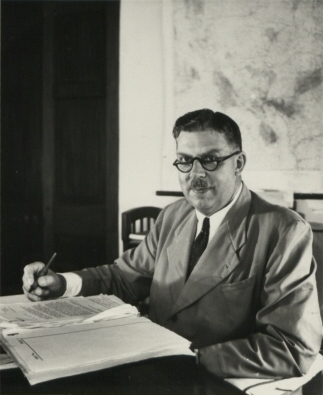
- Longest serving Sir Edward Francis Twining; 18 June 1949 – 16 June 1958
- Tanganyika Territory
- Formation: 27 May 1885
- First holder: Carl Peters
- Final holder: Sir Richard Gordon Turnbull
- Abolished: 9 December 1961
- Succession: Governor-General of Tanganyika

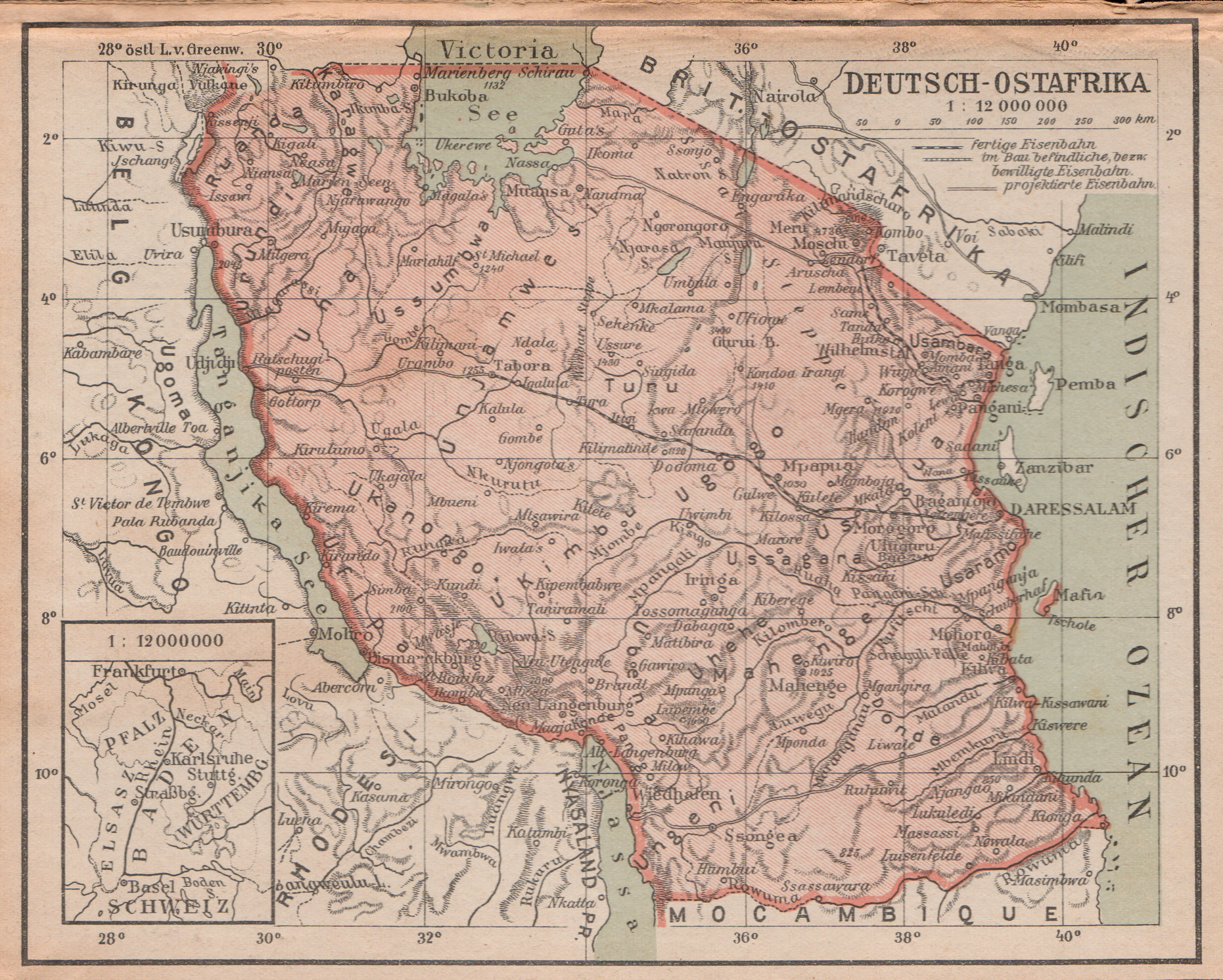
Map of German East Africa.

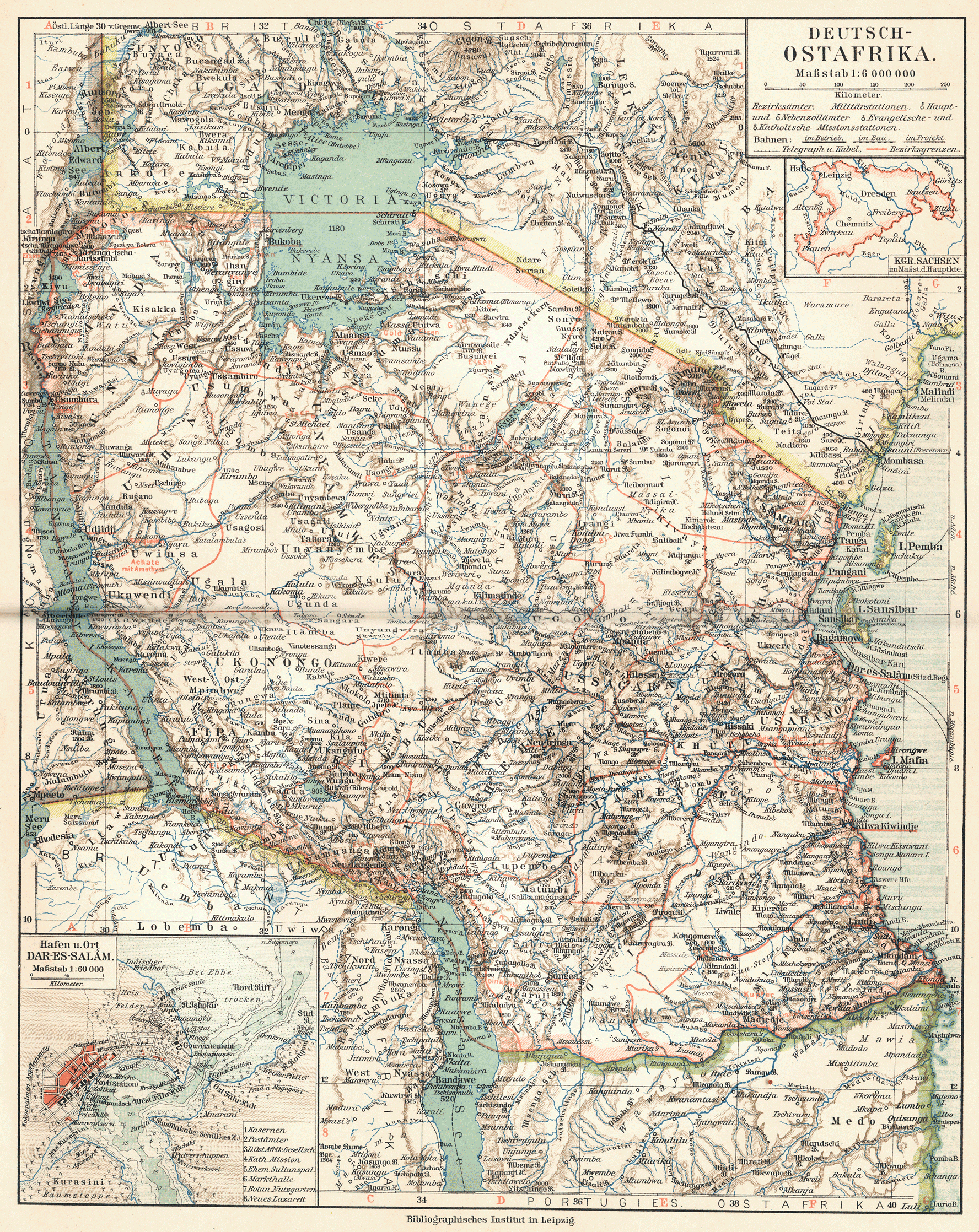
Map of German East Africa (bordered in red), 1905.

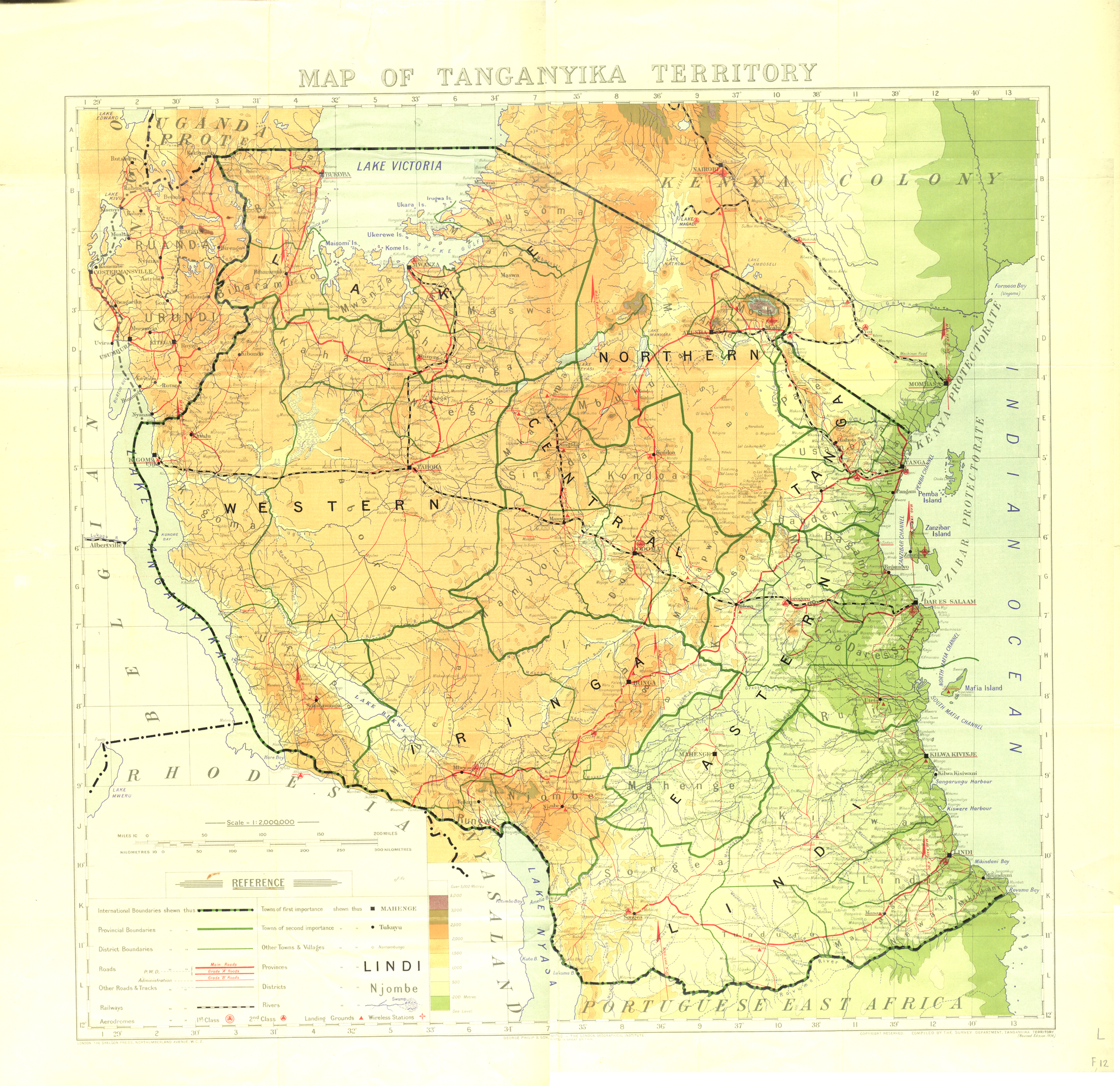
Map of Tanganyika Territory, 1934.

The colony of German East Africa (German: Deutsch-Ostafrika) was founded in the 1880s, after the German explorer Carl Peters signed treaties with native chieftains on neighboring Zanzibar. On 3 March 1885, the government of the German Empire granted an imperial charter to the German East Africa Company, and a protectorate was established. German colonial rule in the region lasted until World War I, when the British occupied the colony during the East African campaign. The Tanganyika Territory was officially established on 20 July 1922, when Britain acquired a mandate to administer the region as a result of Article 22 of the Covenant of the League of Nations. On 18 April 1946, the mandate was reorganized as a Trust Territory of the United Nations. Afterwards, the region remained under British administration until it gained independence on 9 December 1961 as Tanganyika.

== List ==
(Dates in italics indicate de facto continuation of office)

Tenure	Portrait	Incumbent	Notes
German East Africa
Protectorate
27 May 1885 to 8 February 1888		Carl Peters, Administrator	
8 February 1888 to 1 January 1891		Hermann von Wissmann, Reichskommissar	Imperial commissioner, 1st time
Colony
1 January 1891 to 21 February 1891		Hermann von Wissmann, Reichskommissar	Imperial commissioner, 1st time
21 February 1891 to 15 September 1893		Julius von Soden, Governor	
1891		Rüdiger, acting Governor	acting for Soden
15 September 1893 to 25 April 1895		Friedrich von Schele, Governor	
25 April 1895 to 3 December 1896		Hermann von Wissmann, Governor	2nd time
3 December 1896 to 12 March 1901		Eduard von Liebert, Governor	
12 March 1901 to 15 April 1906		Gustav Adolf von Götzen, Governor	
15 April 1906 to 22 April 1912		Albrecht von Rechenberg, Governor	
22 April 1912 to 14 November 1918		Heinrich Schnee, Governor	From 9 October 1916 on the move in opposition to British forces, together with General d. Inf. Lettow-Vorbeck's colonial troops. Later served as the last President of the DKG, from 1930 to 1936
Occupation of German East Africa by United Kingdom
9 October 1916 to 22 July 1920		Horace Archer Byatt, Administrator	From 1918, Sir Horace Archer Byatt
22 July 1920 to 20 July 1922		Sir Horace Archer Byatt, Governor	
Tanganyika Territory
League of Nations Mandate (administered by United Kingdom)
20 July 1922 to 5 March 1925		Sir Horace Archer Byatt, Governor	
1924 to 5 March 1925		John Scott, acting Governor	acting for Byatt
5 March 1925 to 1 February 1931		Donald Charles Cameron, Governor	
1 February 1931 to 23 May 1931		Sir Douglas James Jardine, acting Governor	acting for Cameron
23 May 1931 to February 1934		George Stewart Symes, Governor	
19 February 1934 to 8 July 1938		Sir Harold Alfred MacMichael, Governor	
8 July 1938 to 19 June 1941		Sir Mark Aitchinson Young, Governor	
19 June 1941 to 28 April 1945		Sir Wilfrid Edward Francis Jackson, Governor	
28 April 1945 to 11 December 1946		Sir William Denis Battershill, Governor	
United Nations Trust Territory (administered by United Kingdom)
11 December 1946 to 18 June 1949		Sir William Denis Battershill, Governor	
18 June 1949 to 16 June 1958		Sir Edward Francis Twining, Governor	
16 June 1958 to 15 July 1958		Arthur John Grattan-Bellew, Officer Administering the Government	
15 July 1958 to 9 December 1961		Sir Richard Gordon Turnbull, Governor	
9 December 1961	Independence as Tanganyika		

For continuation after independence, see: List of heads of state of Tanzania#Governor-General

== See also ==
- History of Tanzania
- Politics of Tanzania
- President of Tanzania
  - List of heads of state of Tanzania
- Vice-President of Tanzania
- Prime Minister of Tanzania
  - List of prime ministers of Tanzania
- List of sultans of Zanzibar
- President of Zanzibar
- Vice President of Zanzibar
- List of heads of government of Zanzibar
