= Stewart Symes =

British Army officer and colonial governor (1882–1962)

Lieutenant Colonel Sir Stewart Symes GCB GCMG DSO
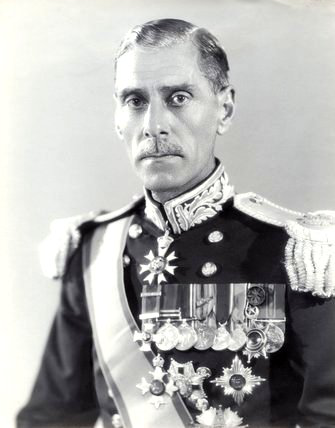
- Stewart Symes by Bassano. 12 July 1938

Resident at Aden
- In office 1928–1931
- Preceded by: John Henry Keith Stewart
- Succeeded by: Bernard Rawdon Reilly

Governor of Tanganyika
- In office 1931–1934
- Preceded by: Donald Charles Cameron
- Succeeded by: Harold MacMichael

Governor-General of Sudan
- In office 10 January 1934 – 19 October 1940
- Preceded by: John Maffey
- Succeeded by: Hubert Huddleston

Personal details
- Born: 29 July 1882 Wateringbury, Kent
- Died: 5 December 1962 (aged 80) Folkestone, Kent

Military service
- Rank: Lieutenant Colonel

Sir George Stewart Symes, GBE, KCMG, DSO (29 July 1882 – 5 December 1962) was a British Army officer and colonial governor. He served as governor of North Palestine from 1920 to 1925, governor of the Tanganyika Territory from 1931 to 1934, and governor-general of Anglo-Egyptian Sudan from 1934 to 1940.

== Career ==
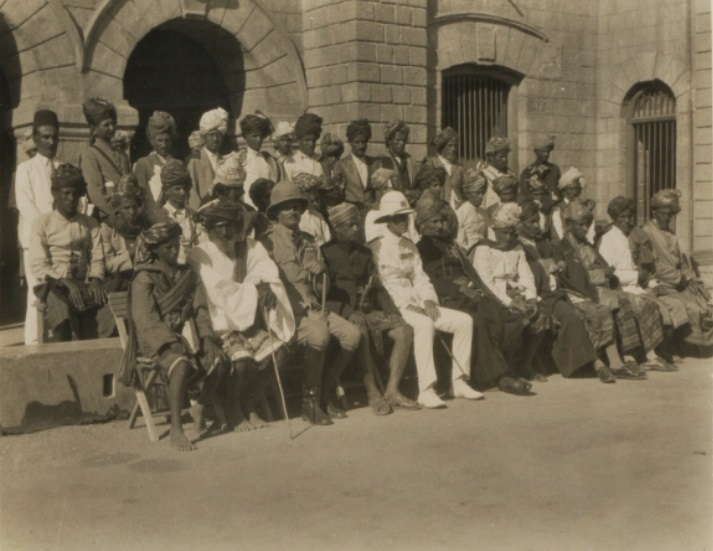
Symes, as resident at Aden

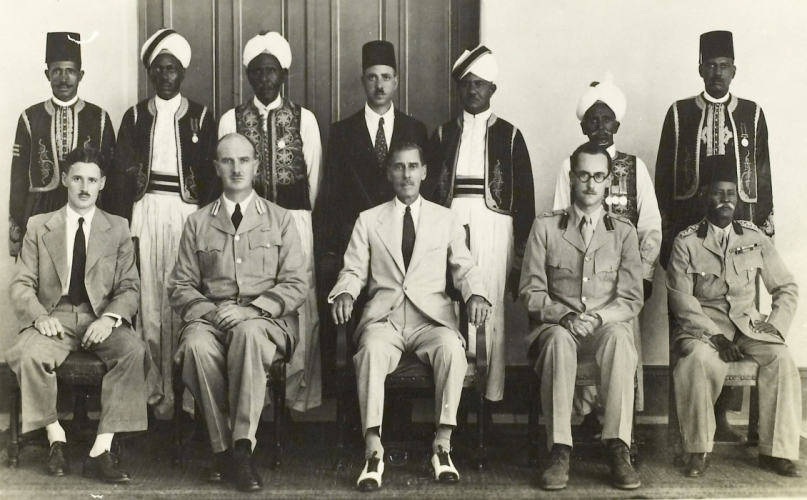
Symes, as governor-general of the Sudan

Symes was commissioned a second lieutenant in The Hampshire Regiment in August 1900, and served in South Africa during the end of the Second Boer War in 1902, receiving the rank of lieutenant on 21 April 1902. Symes took part in the Battle of Rooiwal and was stationed for a while in Potchefstroom. He later stayed briefly in the town of Hermanus which he described as "peaceful." Later that year he was posted in the Aden Hinterland, where he served 1903–1904. He is said to have been the only British army officer to be awarded a Distinguished Service Order (DSO) for services in the hinterland.

From 1913 to 1916, Symes was the private secretary for Governor-General of Sudan Reginald Wingate.

Symes was the governor of North Palestine from 1920 to 1925, and oversaw the areas of Galilee and Samaria. Symes oversaw the negotiations of the border between Mandatory Palestine and the French Syrian Federation. Symes succeeded Donald Charles Cameron as governor of the Tanganyika Territory in 1931. He succeeded John Maffey, 1st Baron Rugby as governor-general of Anglo-Egyptian Sudan in 1934, and was succeeded by Hubert Huddleston in 1940.

On numerous issues he promoted encouraging the native population to vote on matters that affected them. He also insisted, as did his predecessor, that Africans be paid the same wages as Europeans and Indians for the same work. When asked in the 1950s if he supported African independence movements he said that he did.

== Works cited ==
=== Books ===
- Boddy, Janice (2007). Civilizing Women: British Crusades in Colonial Sudan. Princeton University Press. ISBN 9780691123042.
- Long, C. (2019). The Palestinians and British Perfidy: The Tragic Aftermath of the Balfour Declaration of 1917. Liverpool University Press. ISBN 9781845198961.
- Nash, Geoffrey (2022). Religion, Orientalism and Modernity: Mahdi Movements of Iran and South Asia. Edinburgh University Press. ISBN 9781474451680.

=== Journals ===
- Jackson, Jonathan (2024). "'Sold Down the River': Histories of Production, Trade, and Transport along the Waterways of the Kilombero Valley, Tanzania". Zamani: A Journal of African Historical Studies. 1 (1). Pluto Journals: 18–51. doi:10.2307/48815690. JSTOR 48815690.
