= Heinrich Schnee =

German politician (1871–1949)

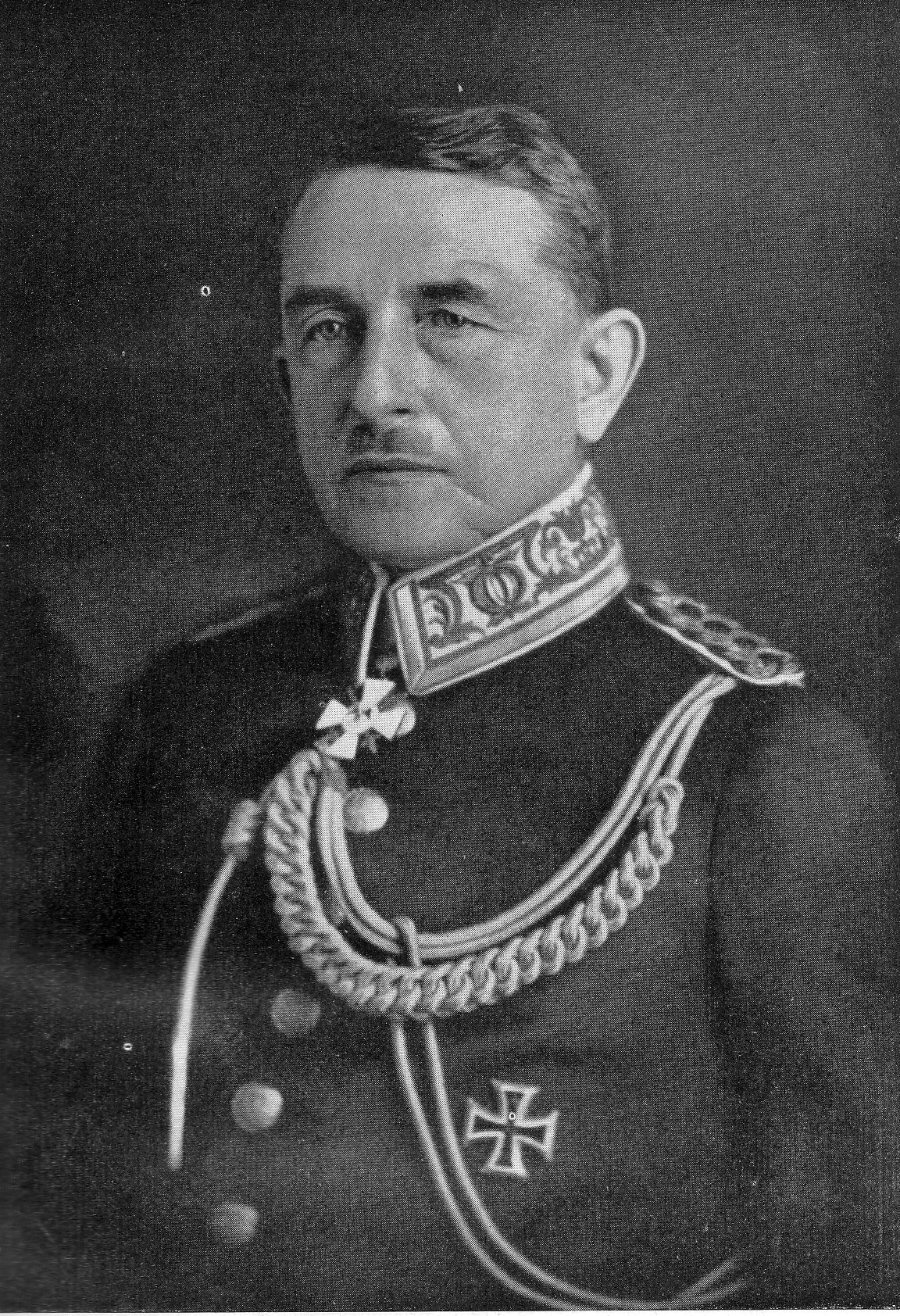

Governor of German East Africa
- In office 1912–1918
- Preceded by: Albrecht von Rechenberg
- Succeeded by: Horace Byatt (Tanganyika)

Personal details
- Born: Heinrich Albert Schnee; 4 February 1871 Neuhaldensleben, German Empire
- Died: 23 June 1949 (aged 78) Berlin, Germany
- Spouse: Ada Woodhill
- Profession: Diplomat, public servant, politician, author

Heinrich Albert Schnee (Albert Hermann Heinrich Schnee; 4 February 1871 – 23 June 1949) was a German lawyer, colonial civil servant, politician, writer, and association official. He served as the last governor of German East Africa.

== Early life and education ==
Schnee was born in Neuhaldensleben, the son of the district court Councillor Hermann Schnee (1829–1901) and his wife Emily (née Scheibe). He attended high school in Nordhausen, and studied law in Heidelberg (as a member of the Corps Rhenania Heidelberg), Kiel, and Berlin (Dr. jur., 1893).

== Career ==
In 1897, he began working in the Federal Foreign Office, and in 1898 he became a judge and the Deputy Governor of German New Guinea. In 1900, he became a District Officer and Deputy Governor of German Samoa. When in New York in 1901, he married Ada Adeline Woodhill (1873-1969), a New Zealand-born actress of English and Irish parents.

After 1904, he again served as a Legation Councillor in the Colonial Department of the Foreign Office in Germany. In 1905, he became Colonial Advisory Councilor of the embassy in London, in 1906, Lecturing Councillor and, in 1907, Dirigent. From 1911 onwards, he was Ministerial Director and head of the political and administrative division in the Imperial Colonial Office in Berlin.

=== Governor of German East Africa ===
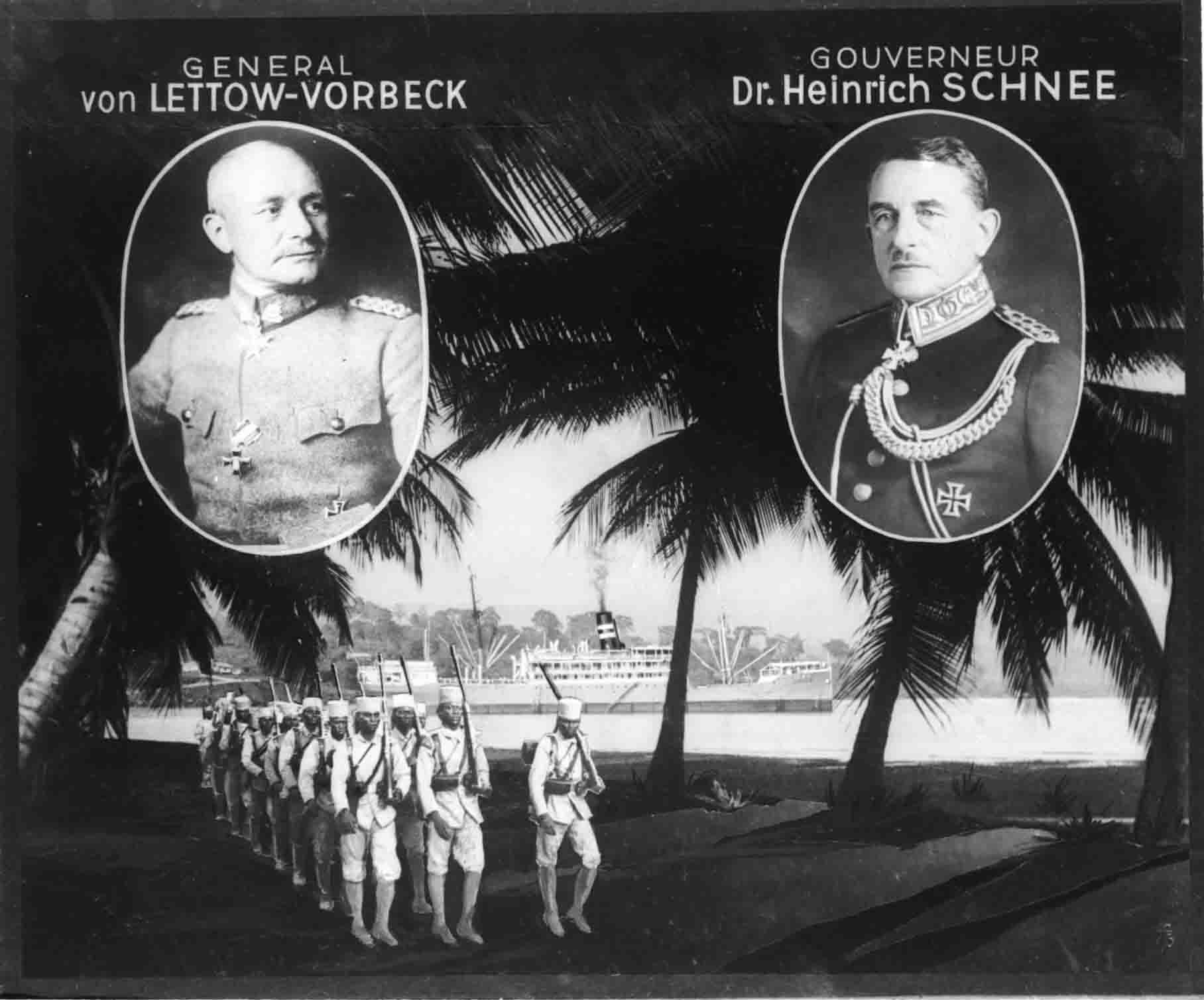
General von Lettow-Vorbeck and colonial Governor Heinrich Schnee

From 1912 to 1918, Schnee served as the last Governor of German East Africa. His tenure was marked by the outbreak of the First World War. As Governor he held supreme military command. However, he soon disagreed with the commander of the Schutztruppe, General Paul von Lettow-Vorbeck, on defensive strategy. Ultimately von Lettow-Vorbeck prevailed with his guerrilla tactics and increasingly assumed control of operations. Schnee, besides his administrative responsibilities, also had to reconcile his family, and according to Wilhelm Methner, who served under the governorship of Schnee as First Secretary, Ada Schnee, "the wife of the governor, who was English by birth, suffered the bitter fate of seeing the sons of her fatherland and of her adoptive country in battle against each other. This brave and upright woman had to bear with much hostility". On 2 March 1919, Schnee and Lettow-Vorbeck led the returning fighters from East Africa through the Brandenburg Gate in Berlin.

=== Political activity ===
After the First World War, Schnee became a long-serving member of the Reichstag of the Weimar Republic. He represented the German People's Party (DVP), and was a deputy from electoral constituency 4 (Potsdam I) from 1924 until 1932. There were some press speculations in 1932 about Schnee becoming Chancellor. He resigned from the DVP in 1932 and, from 1933 to 1945, he again held a Reichstag seat, now for the Nazi Party. In November 1933, he was elected from district 3 (Berlin) before switching to again represent Potsdam in 1936, and finally representing district 6 (Pomerania) at the 1938 election. An active colonial policy outside Europe, as understood by Schnee, the reason for his continued involvement in politics, was not among the new rulers' interests.

Schnee was also internationally known as a leading representative of German colonial interests and was repeatedly invited to lectures in the United States and other European countries. He was appointed to the League of Nations' Manchuria Commission (the Lytton Commission) which negotiated with China and Japan regarding their military conflict over influence in Manchuria and reported to the League of Nations.

=== Association official ===
In 1926, Schnee became the president of the Federation of Germans abroad, a position he held till 1933. From 1930 to 1936 he served as the (last) President of the German Colonial Society (DKG) which then was supplanted by the Reichskolonialbund (RKB). After the Second World War, the Allies considered Schnee incriminated because he had held a Nazi Party Reichstag seat, and he could not continue his work. He died in 1949 in a car accident in Berlin and was buried in the Heerstraße near the highway.

== Historical assessment ==
Heinrich Schnee is one of the figures in German colonial revisionism. Through publication of books and essays, as a politician, and as a federation official and lecturer, he tried to give the "colonial question" national importance and to promote the recovery of the former colonial territories. With the Gleichschaltung of the colonial associations in 1936 it became clear that his influence was gone. Schnee was not considered for a position in the RKB and he did not join the new association.

== Awards and honors ==
- 1925: Dr. rer. pol. h.c. from the University of Hamburg
- 1941: Eagle Shield of the German Reich

== Publications ==
- Bilder aus der Südsee. Unter den kannibalischen Stämmen des Bismarck-Archipels (Images from the South Seas. Among the cannibal tribes of the Bismarck Archipelago). Reimer, Berlin 1904.
- Deutsch-Ostafrika im Weltkriege. Wie wir lebten und kämpften (German East Africa during the World War. How we lived and fought.). Quelle and Meyer, Leipzig 1919.
- Deutsches Koloniallexikon (German colonial lexicon) (Ed.), Quelle and Meyer, Leipzig 1920
- Braucht Deutschland Kolonien? (Does Germany Need Colonies?). Quelle and Meyer, Leipzig 1921
- Die koloniale Schuldlüge (The lie of the colonial guilt). Sachers and Kuschel, Berlin 1924
  - English: German Colonization Past and Future. The Truth about the German Colonies, Nachdruck Kennikat Press, Port Washington/London 1970.
  - Spanish: La colonización alemana: El pasado y el future. La verdad sobre los colonias alemanes, con un prologo de José Vasconcelos. München, Editore Internacional 1929.
  - Italian: La colonizzazione germanica: Il suo passato ed il suo futuro translated from the English translation of 1926. Santoro, Rom 1932.
  - Italian: La menzonga inglese della colpa colonial, Vallecchi, Florenz 1941.
- Nationalismus und Imperialismus (Nationalism and Imperialism), Reimar Hobbing, Berlin 1928.
- Zehn Jahre Versailles (Ten Years of Versailles) (Ed., with Hans Draeger), 3 volumes, Brückenverlag, Berlin 1929/30
- Völker und Mächte im Fernen Osten. Eindrücke von einer Reise mit der Mandschurei-Kommission (Peoples and powers in the Far East. Impressions from a voyage with the Manchuria Commission). Deutsche Buch-Gemeinschaft, Berlin 1933
- Die deutschen Kolonien vor, in und nach dem Weltkrieg (The German colonies before, during and after the Great War) Quelle and Meyer, Leipzig 1935
- Deutschlands koloniale Forderung (Germany's colonial claim). Wendt, Berlin 1937.
- Kolonialmacht Deutschland (Germany, colonial power), German Youth Library No. 679-681, Verlag H.Hilger, Berlin 1940.
- Als letzter Gouverneur in Deutsch-Ostafrika – Erinnerungen (As the last governor of German East Africa - Memories), Ed. Ada Schnee, Quelle und Meyer, Heidelberg 1964. English translation: The Last Governor of German East Africa (2020).

== Sources ==
- Hans Draeger (ed.): Gouverneur Schnee. Ein Künder und Mehrer deutscher Geltung. Zu seinem 60. Geburtstag... (Governor Schnee. An announcer and promoter of German standing. On his 60th Birthday) Stilke, Berlin 1931.
- Ralph Erbar (2007). "Schnee, Albert Hermann Heinrich". Neue Deutsche Biographie (in German). Vol. 23. Berlin: Duncker & Humblot. pp. 280–281. (full text online).
- Biographisches Handbuch des deutschen Auswärtigen Dienstes 1871–1945. (Biographical Handbook of the German Foreign Service 1871-1945) Volume 4: S. Published by Auswärtiges Amt, Historischer Dienst, ed.: Bernd Isphording, Gerhard Keiper, Martin Kröger. Schöningh, Paderborn u. a. 2012, ISBN 978-3-506-71843-3
- Abermeth, Katharina (2017). Heinrich Schnee: Karrierewege und Erfahrungswelten eines deutschen Kolonialbeamten [Heinrich Schnee: Career Paths and Spheres of Experience of a German Colonial Officer] (in German). Solivagus-Verlag Stefan Eick e.K. ISBN 978-3-9817079-4-6.
