= Bernard Henry Bourdillon =

British colonial administrator

Sir Bernard Henry Bourdillon GCMG KBE
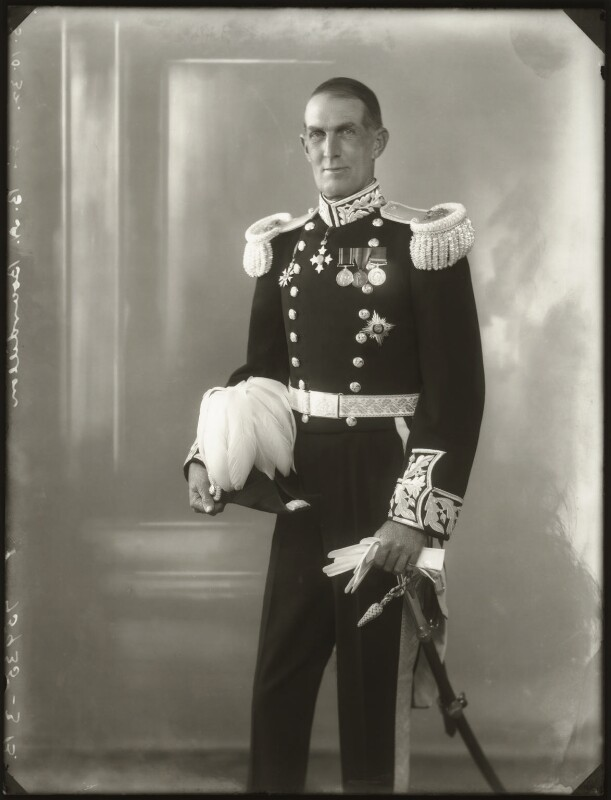
- Sir Bernard Henry Bourdillon by Bassano. 3 October 1932.

Governor of Nigeria
- In office 1 November 1935 – 1943
- Preceded by: Sir Donald Charles Cameron
- Succeeded by: Sir Arthur Richards

Governor of Uganda
- In office 1932–1935
- Preceded by: Sir William Frederick Gowers
- Succeeded by: Sir Philip Euen Mitchell

Acting Governor of British Ceylon
- In office 11 February 1931 – 11 April 1931
- Monarch: George V
- Preceded by: Herbert Stanley
- Succeeded by: Graeme Thomson

Personal details
- Born: 3 December 1883 Burnie, Tasmania
- Died: 6 February 1948 (aged 64) St Saviour, Jersey
- Citizenship: British

Sir Bernard Henry Bourdillon GCMG KBE (1883–1948) was a British colonial administrator who was Governor of Uganda (1932–1935) and of Nigeria (1935–1943).

== Early years ==
Bourdillon was born on 3 December 1883 at Burnie, Tasmania to English parents. Despite being born in Tasmania, he said he considered himself "English, not Australian." He grew up in England and South Africa, and was educated at Tonbridge School in Tonbridge, Kent. He attended St John's College, Oxford, graduating in 1906. In 1908, he entered the Indian Civil Service. He married Violet Grace Billinghurst in November 1909. In 1935, Violet was described as "the perfect Governor's wife". His three sons, Bernard Godwin Bourdillon, Henry Townsend Bourdillon and Patrick Imbert Bourdillon attended Corpus Christi College, Oxford, and they all followed their father into the Colonial Service. Bernard Godwin Bourdillon, Assistant Chief Secretary to Palestine, was later killed in the King David Hotel bombing in 1946.

In 1913, Bourdillon was appointed Under-Secretary to the Government of the United Provinces. In 1915, he was made Registrar of the High Court of Allahabad. While in India, he earned a reputation as a linguist.

During the First World War, Bourdillon joined the army as a temporary Second Lieutenant in 1917 and was posted to Iraq in 1918. He rose to the rank of Major, and during the Iraq insurrection of 1919, he was mentioned in dispatches.

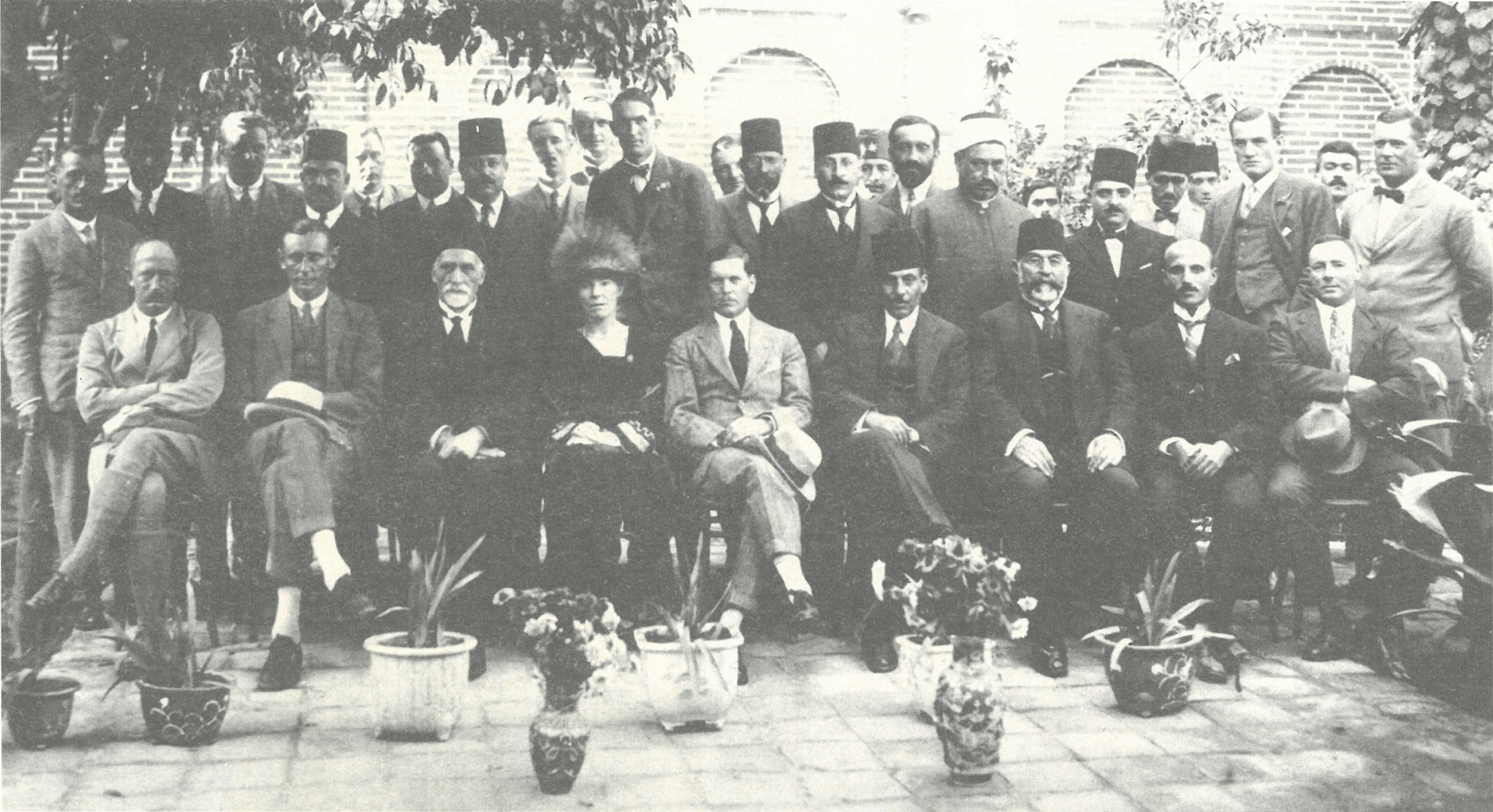
A photograph of British and Iraqi dignitaries in Baghdad from 1923 during the era of Mandatory Iraq. From second left to right in the front row, Kinahan Cornwallis, Sassoon Eskell, and Gertrude Bell. Bourdillon stands directly behind Bell in the second row.

Bourdillon left the army in 1919 to join the Iraq civil administration and was appointed Political Secretary to the High Commissioner of Iraq in 1921. From 1924 to 1929, he was Counsellor. Between 1925 and 1926, he was High Commissioner with Plenipotentiary Powers in the negotiations over the 1926 Anglo-Iraq treaty.

== Colonial service ==
=== Ceylon ===
Bourdillon transferred to the Colonial Civil Service in 1929 to take the post of Colonial Secretary of Ceylon, serving in this role until 1932 and twice acting as Governor of Ceylon. Whilst in Ceylon, he served as president of the Ceylon Branch of the Royal Asiatic Society in 1931. He was also invited to the Maldives in 1931 to advise Sultan Muhammad Shamsuddeen III on the drafting of the country's first written constitution. He recommended that the country should be run by a council of ministers led by a prime minister, however his advice was not accepted by the drafting committee.

=== Uganda ===
In 1932, he was appointed Governor and Commander-in-Chief of Uganda. In Uganda, Bourdillon was said to have "gotten lucky" in that several issues arose while he was governor where he was able to make decisions that were popular with the African majority. On one occasion, there was conflict between Arab merchants in Kampala (themselves immigrants from Britain's territory of Aden) and African storekeepers in the same community. Bourdillon examined the evidence and felt it was objectively true that the Arab storekeepers had engaged in abusive practices, some of which ran counter to the laws of the Uganda Protectorate. Correspondingly, he ruled in favor of the African storekeepers.

On another occasion he was approached by leaders of the Tooro Kingdom who claimed Belgian poachers were illegally crossing over from the Belgian Congo and hunting game on lands belonging to the Tooro Kingdom. Bourdillon investigated the matter and had the Askari patrol the border to apprehend the poachers. The poachers were subsequently arrested and jailed by British authorities, despite being European. On another occasion, a Belgian resident of Entebbe was accused of beating his African servants. Bourdillon called witnesses, including the Belgian man's other employees. After hearing all of the evidence the Belgian man was made to pay a fine and was subsequently deported from the Uganda Protectorate to the Belgian Congo. In both of the aforementioned instances, Bourdillon had sided with indigenous Africans against Europeans and used his place in the colonial power structure to enforce rulings in favor of Africans against Europeans. This was notable for being exceedingly rare in colonial Africa.

There had been toll roads built through the territory of the Lango people in the center of the protectorate. Many Lango people complained about these toll roads. After "being encouraged by a District Commissioner to petition the governor with their grievances", a group of Lango people gathered together a petition explaining why they did not like the toll roads and that they wanted the tolls removed. Hundreds of Lango people signed the petition. The District Commissioner helped them bring their petition to Bourdillon. After reviewing the petition and speaking with both the DC and the Lango leaders who the DC brought to him, Bourdillon ordered the tolls to be removed immediately. The entire meeting lasted only two hours, and the return of the DC and the Lango leaders to the Lango-majority region in the center of the protectorate was "triumphant."

=== Nigeria ===
In 1935, he was made Governor and Commander-in-Chief of Nigeria, holding the post until he retired in 1943. Sir Bernard Bourdillon was aligned with the reforming trend in colonial policy, and rapidly gained the respect and friendship of the educated elite of Nigeria. On 1 February 1938, he met with the Nigerian Youth Movement to hear their complaints about the way in which the European Cocoa Pool agreement was limiting competition. When asked to take a neutral position in the dispute he refused, saying he supported the African position. A few days later the Colonial Office announced a commission of inquiry and soon after the pool was suspended. Nnamdi Azikiwe's West African Pilot was full of praise for Bourdillon. He continued to remain on close terms with Nigerian opinion leaders throughout his term.

Bourdillon has been described as being "Far ahead of his time" on issues of race. He once wrote that he "wholeheartedly reject(ed) the foolish notion that some races are inherently superior to others" saying "such claims have no basis in either science or Christianity." In some ways this made him controversial, he consistently supported African efforts to gain self-government, and in both Uganda and Nigeria undertook efforts to increase African participation in government.

Britain was wary about getting drawn into permanent expenses with the colonies and would advance loans only if the colonial government guaranteed to cover interest charges or repay the investment. This inhibited the poorer colonies from requesting support for development schemes. In 1939, Bourdillon wrote to the Secretary of State concerning the economic development of the African colonies. After describing how little had been spent on development and giving the reasons, he asked that the British government "should accept responsibility for financing the operations of the agricultural, forestry, geological survey, veterinary and co-operative departments" under a ten-year programme.

Bourdillon divided the south of Nigeria into Eastern and Western provinces in 1939. In the early days in Nigeria, the British had governed the north of Nigeria indirectly, through the traditional rulers of the Muslim emirates, and had kept the region somewhat isolated from the outside world. There was perhaps a subconscious view that the feudal society was not ready for the full impact of modern civilization. Sir Bernard Bourdillon decided that this was not a viable policy. In February 1942, he visited the leading Emirs and gave his opinion that they should not say "We will not have the southerners interfering in our affairs" but instead should say "we ought to have at least an equal say with the southerners in advising the Governor as the affairs of the whole country". The emirs accepted this advice. Bourdillon had over 100 British employees in northern Nigeria and over 400 in the Yorubaland region of Nigeria replaced with locals who were trained to fill the same positions, Bourdillon insisted on these African employees being paid the same as their outgoing British predecessors.

Bourdillon recognized that the northerners were handicapped in comparison to the southerners by their lack of education and lack of English. Rather than simply expand the Legislative Council to include more northerners, he explored the idea of Regional Councils with a Central Council in Lagos that would review their findings. However, he saw these councils as strictly advisory in nature, saying "a benevolent autocracy is the form of government best suited to a people who are educationally backward and whose religion inculcates a blind obedience to authority". This view of the non-political nature of the regional councils helped alleviate concerns that the proposed federal system would cause antagonism between state and federal authorities.

Bourdillon raised the question of whether Nigeria should be further subdivided into more than three regions. Some officials thought that the Tiv and Idoma divisions and most of Kabba province should be detached from the north. Some were in favour of more regions, each more homogenous ethnically, in a similar arrangement to that followed in East Africa. No further changes were made before Sir Bernard retired, handing over to Sir Arthur Richards.

He is credited as an adviser on the film Sanders of the River.

== Later years ==
After retirement, Bourdillon continued to serve on the Colonial Economic and Development Council. He became treasurer and then chairman of the British Empire Leprosy Relief Association. In 1946, his son, Bernard, who was working in Palestine, was killed in the King David Hotel bombing. He was a director of Barclays Bank (Dominion, Colonial and Overseas), and of Barclays Overseas Development Corporation. When asked if the African territories that he governed should be given independence in the same manner that India had, if they voted to say that they wanted it, he said he believed that they should and that "African nationalism will emerge, and should be respected when it does." He died on 6 February 1948 at St Saviour, Jersey, aged 64.

The upmarket and exclusive Bourdillon road in Ikoyi, Lagos, is named after him.

== Awards ==
Bourdillon was appointed a CMG in the 1924 Birthday Honours and promoted to KCMG in the 1934 Birthday Honours and to GCMG in the 1937 Coronation Honours. He had been appointed KBE in the 1931 Birthday Honours. He was made a Knight of Grace of the Order of St John of Jerusalem and an honorary fellow of St John's College, Oxford.

== Bibliography ==
- The Future of the Colonial Empire. London: S.C.M. Press. 1945.

Government offices
Preceded by Herbert Stanley	Acting; Governor of British Ceylon; 1931	Succeeded by Graeme Thomson
Preceded by Donald Charles Cameron	Governor of Nigeria; 1935–1943	Succeeded by Arthur Richards
