= Donald Charles Cameron (colonial administrator) =

British colonial governor

Sir Donald Charles Cameron GCMG KBE
- Cameron in 1932 by Walter Stoneman

Governor of Tanganyika
- In office 1925–1931
- Preceded by: Horace Byatt
- Succeeded by: George Stewart Symes

4th Governor of Nigeria
- In office 1931–1935
- Preceded by: Graeme Thomson
- Succeeded by: Bernard Henry Bourdillon

Personal details
- Born: 3 June 1872 Georgetown, British Guiana
- Died: 8 January 1948 (aged 75) London, United Kingdom
- Profession: colonial administrator

Sir Donald Charles Cameron, GCMG, KBE (3 June 1872 – 8 January 1948) was a British colonial governor. He was the second governor of the British mandate of Tanganyika, and later the governor of Nigeria.

== Biography ==
Cameron was born 3 June 1872 in British Guiana (now Guyana), the son of a sugar planter called Donald Charles Cameron and Mary Emily (née Brassington). He went to Rathmines School in Dublin, and never attended university. In 1890, he returned to British Guiana and began work as a clerk in the Inland Revenue department of the civil service. In 1904, Cameron travelled to Mauritius as assistant Colonial Secretary under Sir Cavendish Boyle. He moved to Southern Nigeria in 1908 and was central secretary under Sir Frederick Lugard. He became influenced by Lugard's ideas of indirect rule.

In September 1925, Cameron became the second governor of the British mandate of Tanganyika, taking over from John Scott, who was acting governor for Sir Horace Byatt. In 1926, Sir Edward Grigg who at the time was the Governor of British Kenya, called a conference in Nairobi to discuss closer union of Britain's East African colonies of Kenya, Uganda and Tanganyika, which Sir William Frederick Gowers of Uganda fully supported. However, Governor Donald Charles Cameron of Tanganyika was firmly against it, thinking it would be unjust to Africans. After a somewhat prolonged diplomatic back and forth Governor Cameron prevailed in making sure that no land in Tanganyika would be taken away from native Africans and given to white settlers. From 1931 to 1935 he was governor and commander-in-chief of Nigeria. Cameron also disagreed with Grigg about the issue of enforcing bans on certain cultural practices such as female circumcision. In Kenya Grigg had attempted to use force to "stamp out the practice," by both declaring it illegal and by arresting any man found to have committed it. Cameron disagreed with this approach and believed being "heavy handed" would "backfire" and that the British should instead try to persuade people to give up such practices. On this note Cameron said "time and great patience are needed and a realization that attempts at coercion and isolated prohibitions will inevitably cause a revulsion against our culture and our religion and a disposition to reject our help..."

=== Personal life ===
In 1903, Cameron married Gertrude Gittens, the daughter of a sugar planter in Barbados. They had one son who died in an aircraft accident at sea in 1941. Donald Cameron retired in 1935 and died 8 January 1948 in London, aged 75.

== Honours ==
Cameron was appointed a Companion of the Order of St Michael and St George (CMG) in the 1918 Birthday Honours, a Knight Commander of the Order of the British Empire (KBE) in the 1923 New Year Honours, promoted to Knight Commander of the Order of St Michael and St George (KCMG) in the 1926 Birthday Honours, and again to Knight Grand Cross of the Order (GCMG) in the 1932 Birthday Honours.

== Bibliography ==
- Cameron, Donald (1931). Principles of Native Administration and their Application. Government Printer.
- Cameron, Donald (1939). My Tanganyika Service and Some Nigeria. G.Allen and Unwin.

Government offices
Preceded by Horace Byatt	Governors of Tanganyika; 1925–1931	Succeeded by George Stewart Symes
Preceded by Graeme Thomson	Governors of Nigeria; 1931–1935	Succeeded by Bernard Henry Bourdillon
