= Compagnie du chemin de fer du Bas-Congo au Katanga =

Compagnie du chemin de fer du bas-Congo au Katanga
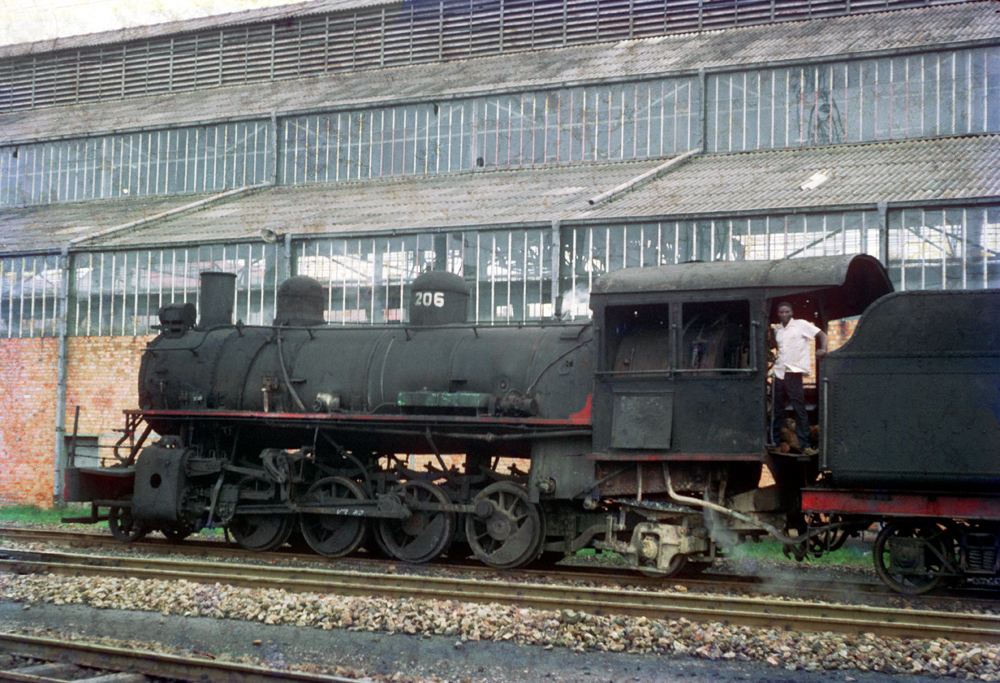
- KDL 200 Series 2-8-2 no. 206 on shunt duty outside Lubumbashi ATC (1972)
- Trade name: BCK
- Type: Railway company
- Founded: 31 October 1906
- Defunct: 1970
- Area served: Congo Free State, Belgian Congo / Democratic Republic of the Congo

The Compagnie du chemin de fer du bas-Congo au Katanga (BCK) was a railway operator in the Congo Free State, Belgian Congo and later in the Democratic Republic of the Congo and Zaire. Most of the lines were in the southern Katanga Province, with links to the Kasai River for transport of mineral exports down to Kinshasa and onward to the port of Matadi, and a link to the Angolan railway network for transport to Lobito on the Atlantic.

== Background ==
The Comité Spécial du Katanga (CSK) created the Compagnie de Chemin de fer du Katanga (CFK) in 1902. It had a capital of 1,000,000 francs. The Congo Free State held 2,400 shares and the businessman and industrialist Robert Williams held 1,600 shares. Théodore Heyvaert was president and Robert Williams was vice-president. The CFK was to build links to the region where the city of Elisabethville (Lubumbashi) would be founded. One line would connect to the Rhodesian railways at Sakania, while another would connect to the port of Bukama on the Lualaba River.

The Union Minière du Haut-Katanga (UMHK) was founded in 1906 to develop mines in Katanga. It was also to participate in building a railway to carry material and equipment to the mines and to take away the extracted minerals.

== Foundation ==
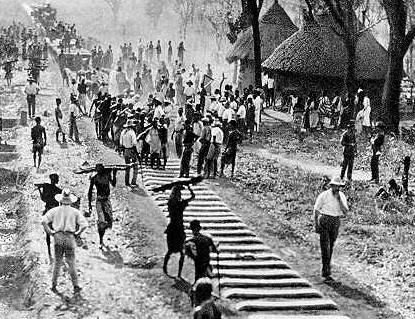
Chemin de fer de Katanga reaches Elisabethville in 1910.

On 31 October 1906 the CSK, the Congo Free State and the Société Générale de Belgique founded the Compagnie du Chemin de fer du Bas-Congo au Katanga (BCK) to build a rail link from Bukama to Port Franqui on the Kasai River and to carry out mining research in a defined area. The UMHK acquired almost 10% of the BCK, but the government was the main shareholder. Jean Jadot, who had built the 2,215 kilometres (1,376 mi) Beijing-Hankow line in China, was made managing director. The BCK controlled the CFK on behalf of the government. The BCK was to:

- Survey, build and operate a railway line from Katanga to Bas-Congo, the Bukama–Port Francqui (Ilebo) line.
- Survey, build and operate a line connecting the Katanga mines to the Portuguese Benguela railway, the Tenke–Dilolo line.
- Take over the Free State's share in the CFK and survey, build and operate a line connecting the navigable part of the Lualaba to the southern border of Katanga, the Sakania–Bukama line.

== History ==
Railways in the Belgian Congo

The line from Elisabethville (Lubumbashi) down to Bukama on the Lualaba River was started in 1911 and completed in 1918. In 1919 the BCK founded the subsidiary Société Minière du Bécéka for mining research.

BCK connected the mines of Southern Katanga, or Shaba, to the port of Ilebo on the Kasai River. The 1,123 kilometres (698 mi) line from Bukama to Ilebo was started in 1923 and completed in 1928. In Ilebo the minerals were transshipped to riverboats and carried to Kinshasa. From there, they were taken on the Matadi–Kinshasa Railway down to the Atlantic port of Matadi for export. In the 1920s it was proposed to build a rail link from Ilebo to Kinshasa, but this was never implemented.

The Société des Chemins de fer Léopoldville-Katanga-Dilolo (LKD) was created through a 16 September 1927 agreement between the government and BCK, and was an administrative and financial vehicle. The government was its main shareholder, and granted it concessions for the three lines: Bukama–Port-Francqui, Tenke–Dilolo and Port-Francqui–Léopoldville. Construction and operation of the lines was subcontracted to BCK. BCK was responsible for all the track, and operated the network and equipment as a whole. The 523 kilometres (325 mi) line from Tenke to Dilolo was completed in 1931. At Dilolo the BCK network connected to the Benguela railway, which carried goods to the port of Lobito on the Atlantic.

In 1952 LKD merged with CFK to form the Compagnie des Chemins de fer Katanga-Dilolo-Léopoldville (KDL). KDL held the rail network concessions in Katanga, while BCK was the operator. Between 1952 and 1956 the Chemins de Fer des Grands Lacs (CFL) built a 246 kilometres (153 mi) line from Kabalo to Kabongo. In September 1955 the CFL converted from 1,000 mm (3 ft 3 3/8 in) to 1,067 mm (3 ft 6 in) gauge to match the KDL gauge. The connecting line from Kabongo to Kamina was built by BCK for the KDL.

The Democratic Republic of the Congo became independent in 1960. In 1961 the BCK was divided into two companies: an old BCK under Belgian law and a new BCK under Congolese law. The latter was taken over in 1970 by the Compagnie de chemin de fer de Kinshasa-Dilolo-Lubumbashi (KDL). On 1 July 1974 KDL was taken over by the state-owned Société Nationale des Chemins de Fer Zaïrois, which now owned all the railways in the Congo.

== Network ==
The railway network was 1,645 kilometres (1,022 mi) long. The gauge of all lines was 1,067 mm (3 ft 6 in), the same as that used in South Africa. They were single track, with passing stations. Gradients were no more than 12.5/1000, with compensation for curves with a radius of less than 1,000 metres (3,300 ft). Between Tenke and Bukama there were gradients of 15/1000 or 20/1000. The minimum radius of curves was 300 metres (980 ft), or in rara cases 200 metres (660 ft).

- Bukama - Port Franqui, 979 kilometres (608 mi), opened July 1928 to passenger traffic.

Bukama - Kamina, 1,452 kilometres (902 mi), opened 20 May 1926
Kamina - Mwene-Ditu, 313.6 kilometres (194.9 mi), opened 1 March 1928
Mwene-Ditu - Kananga, 243 kilometres (151 mi), opened 30 November 1927
Kananga - Mweka, 250 kilometres (160 mi), opened 13 February 1928
Mweka - Port Franqui (Ilebo), 172 kilometres (107 mi), opened 1 March 1928

- Kamina - Kabalo, 445.6 kilometres (276.9 mi),

Kamina - Kabongo, 200 kilometres (120 mi), opened 1 June 1955
Kabongo - Zofu, 235 kilometres (146 mi), opened 11 April 1956
Zofu - Kabalo, 10.6 kilometres (6.6 mi), opened 15 April 1956

By the 1950s, portions of the rail network were electrified.

== See also ==
- Rail transport in the Democratic Republic of the Congo

== Sources ==
- BCK - KDL - Le site des chemins de fer du Katanga, 2010, archived from the original on 2010-12-04
- Bobb, F. Scott (2010), "Railways" (PDF), Historical Dictionary of the Democratic Republic of the Congo (3 ed.), Scarecrow Press, ISBN 978-0-8108-6325-5
- "Les Compagnies ferroviaires", Congo Poste
- N'Lemvo Dedengity, Alain Riche (2008), "Historique de la S.N.C.C.", La problématique de l'audit interne dans la gestion des entreprises publiques en République Démocratique du Congo: Cas de « LA SOCIETE NATIONALE DE CHEMINS DE FER DU CONGO (thesis), Institut supérieur du commerce
- Rixke (18 January 2012), "La compagnie des chemins de fer du Congo supérieur aux Grands Lacs Africains (C.F.L.)", Rixke Rail’s Archives (in French)
- U.S. Dept of Commerce (1974), Trading with the U.S.S.R., U.S. Department of Commerce, Domestic and International Business Administration
