= Société des Chemins de fer Léopoldville-Katanga-Dilolo =

- Trade name: LKD
- Company type: Railway company
- Industry: rail transport
- Founded: 16 September 1927
- Defunct: 1952
- Headquarters: City of Brussels
- Area served: Congo Free State / Belgian Congo
- Parent: Compagnie du chemin de fer du Bas-Congo au Katanga

The Société des Chemins de fer Léopoldville-Katanga-Dilolo (LKD) was a railway concession owner in the Congo Free State, Belgian Congo. The network was built, maintained and operated by the Compagnie du chemin de fer du bas-Congo au Katanga (BCK).

== History ==
Railways in the Belgian Congo

The Société des Chemins de fer Léopoldville-Katanga-Dilolo (LKD) was created through a 16 September 1927 agreement between the government and BCK, and was an administrative and financial vehicle. The government was its main shareholder, and granted it concessions for the three lines: Bukama–Port-Francqui, Tenke–Dilolo and Port-Francqui–Léopoldville. Construction and operation of the lines was subcontracted to BCK. BCK was responsible for all the track, and operated the network and equipment as a whole. The 523 kilometres (325 mi) line from Tenke to Dilolo was completed in 1931. At Dilolo the BCK network connected to the Benguela railway, which carried goods to the port of Lobito on the Atlantic.

In 1952 LKD merged with Compagnie de Chemin de fer du Katanga CFK to form the Compagnie des Chemins de fer Katanga-Dilolo-Léopoldville (KDL). KDL held the rail network concessions in Katanga, while BCK was the operator.

== Network ==
- Dilolo - Tenke, (529.9 kilometres (329.3 mi))
  Dilolo - Kasaji, (137.6 kilometres (85.5 mi)), opened | June 1930
  Kasaji - Manika, Kolwezi, (296.3 kilometres (184.1 mi)), opened 10 March 1931
  Manika - Divuma – Tenke , (86.0 kilometres (53.4 mi)), opened 26 April 1931
- Divuma – Kisenge mines, (29.4 kilometres (18.3 mi)), opened in 1931, branch line

== See also ==
- Rail transport in the Democratic Republic of the Congo

== Sources ==
- BCK - KDL - Le site des chemins de fer du Katanga, 2010, archived from the original on 2010-12-04
- Bobb, F. Scott (2010), "Railways" (PDF), Historical Dictionary of the Democratic Republic of the Congo (3 ed.), Scarecrow Press, ISBN 978-0-8108-6325-5
