= Compagnie des Chemins de fer Katanga-Dilolo-Léopoldville =

Société des Chemins de fer Katanga-Dilolo-Léopoldville
- Trade name: KDL
- Company type: Railway company
- Founded: 1952
- Defunct: 1974
- Area served: Congo Free State / Belgian Congo

The Société des Chemins de fer Katanga-Dilolo-Léopoldville (KDL) was a railway concession owner in the Congo Free State, Belgian Congo. The network was built, maintained and operated by the Compagnie du chemin de fer du bas-Congo au Katanga (BCK).

== History ==
Railways in the Belgian Congo

In 1952 the Société des Chemins de fer Léopoldville-Katanga-Dilolo (LKD) merged with Compagnie de Chemin de fer du Katanga CFK to form the Société des Chemins de fer Katanga-Dilolo-Léopoldville (KDL). The merger of the two companies was the work of Odon Jadot, chairman of the board of both CFK and KDL. The new company was the sole railway concessionary in the Katanga Province. KDL held the rail network concessions in Katanga, while BCK was the operator.

In 1960 the company was nationalized and became the Compagnie des Chemins de Fer Kinshasa-Dilolo-Lubumbashi (KDL). In 1970 the company took over BCK. On 1 July 1974 the Compagnie de chemin de fer de Kinshasa-Dilolo-Lubumbashi was taken over by the state-owned Société Nationale des Chemins de Fer Zaïrois, which now owned all the railways in the Congo.

== Network ==
- Dilolo - Tenke, (529.9 kilometres (329.3 mi))
  Dilolo - Kasaji, (137.6 kilometres (85.5 mi)), opened 1 June 1930
  Kasaji - Manika, Kolwezi, (296.3 kilometres (184.1 mi)), opened 10 March 1931
  Manika - Divuma – Tenke, (86.0 kilometres (53.4 mi)), opened 26 April 1931
- Divuma – Kisenge mines, (29.4 kilometres (18.3 mi)), opened in 1931, branch line

== See also ==
- Rail transport in the Democratic Republic of the Congo

== Sources ==
- BCK - KDL - Le site des chemins de fer du Katanga, 2010, archived from the original on 2010-12-04
- Brion, R.; Moreau, Moreau (2015), "Jadot (Odon)", Biographie Belge d'Outre-Mer, vol. IX, Acad. Roy. Science d'Outre-Mer, pp. col.204–210
- N'Lemvo Dedengity, Alain Riche (2008), "Historique de la S.N.C.C.", La problématique de l'audit interne dans la gestion des entreprises publiques en République Démocratique du Congo: Cas de « LA SOCIETE NATIONALE DE CHEMINS DE FER DU CONGO (thesis), Institut supérieur du commerce
- U.S. Dept of Commerce (1974), Trading with the U.S.S.R., U.S. Department of Commerce, Domestic and International Business Administration
