= Société Nationale des Chemins de Fer Zaïrois =

State railway company of Zaire (1974–1995)

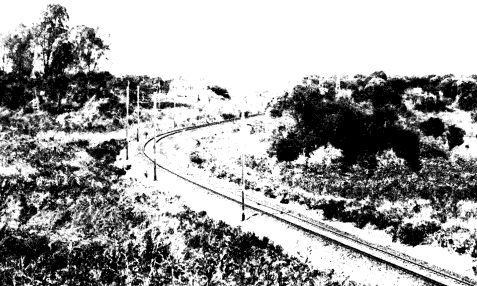
- Railroad track, Lubumbashi, Zaire c.1983
- Trade name: SNCZ
- Type: Railway company
- Founded: 1 July 1974
- Defunct: November 1995
- Area served: Zaire

The Société Nationale des Chemins de Fer Zaïrois (SNCZ) was the state railway company in Zaire (now the Democratic Republic of the Congo) formed in 1974 by combining several privately owned railways. It suffered from lack of maintenance of the tracks and rolling stock, weak management, and external factors such as the Angolan Civil War and the collapse of the economy of Zaire under President Mobutu Sese Seko. Despite two projects funded by the World Bank, it had virtually ceased to function by the 1990s. It was replaced in 1995 by the short-lived private company SIZARAIL, which in turn was replaced by the present Société nationale des chemins de fer du Congo. The main purpose of the railway was to carry minerals from the Shaba mining region to the port of Matadi.

== Background ==
One of the main requirements for transport in Zaire was to carry minerals from Shaba (Katanga) to the port of Matadi on the lower Congo River, a distance of 2,600 kilometres (1,600 mi), and to transport imports in the reverse direction. The railway ran from Shaba to Ilebo on the Kasai River. From there, the Office national des transports (Onatra) took over and carried the minerals by boat down the Kasai and Congo rivers to Kinshasa, then by rail to Matadi, from where they could be shipped overseas.

Alternative routes could take exported minerals from Shaba 2,400 kilometres (1,500 mi) to Dar es Salaam in Tanzania, 3,522 kilometres (2,188 mi) to Durban in South Africa, or 1,200 kilometres (750 mi) to Lobito in Angola. Copper from Zambia was shipped through Zaire lines to the Benguela railway to Lobito on the west coast of Angola, providing foreign exchange that the Shaba railway used to buy fuel and spare parts, and invest in maintenance.

== Formation ==
Railways in the Congo as of 1960

The Société Nationale des Chemins de Fer Zaïrois (SNCZ) was formed on 1 July 1974 by merging five existing railway companies:

- Chemins de Fer Kinshasa-Dilolo-Lubumbashi, formerly Chemins de Fer du Bas-Congo au Katanga (BCK), the longest system at 1,645 kilometres (1,022 mi). It connected the mines of southern Katanga to the port of Ilebo on the Kasai River. The section from Bukama to Ilebo was completed in 1928. The section from Tenke to Dililo connected Katanga to the Angolan Benguela Railway, and was completed in 1931.
- Chemins de Fer des Grands Lacs (CFL). Connected the navigable part of the upper Congo River to the navigable parts of the Lualaba River, bypassing two sections of cataracts, and opened in 1911. It was extended to Kabalo in 1938, and later connected to Kalemia on Lake Tanganyika. It was linked to the KDL system in 1956 by a branch from Kabalo to Kamina.
- Chemins de Fer Vicinaux du Zaïre (CVZ), formerly Chemins de Fer Vicinaux du Congo. A 1,025 kilometres (637 mi) narrow-gauge railway that connected agricultural areas in the northeast to the port of Aketi on the Itimbiri River. In 1973 it was extended to Bumba on the Congo River.
- Chemin de Fer Matadi-Kinshasa (CFMK), the oldest railway line in the Congo, completed in 1898. It connected the ocean port of Matadi with Kinshasa, from where river and rail transport served the rest of the country.
- Chemin de Fer de Mayombe (CFM). A 140 kilometres (87 mi) line that linked the port of Boma on the lower Congo to the Tshela agricultural area near Cabinda.

The network in Shaba was financially viable, but the other networks serving remote agricultural areas in the north and east were not.

The government's stated objectives included ensuring transport flowed smoothly in the Shaba mining area, maintaining and improving the rail facilities, keeping transport costs to the minimum for the mining industry and agricultural producers, and to strengthen management of the consolidated rail network while phasing out foreign staff.

== Deterioration ==
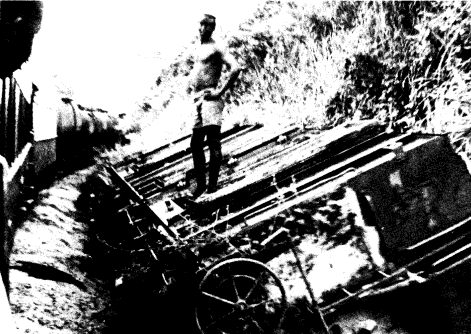
Derailment south of Ilebo, Zaire (note steep drop-off). Derailments were averaging 10 per month along the heavily traveled and badly worn portion of tracks between Tenke and Ilebo in 1983

Under President Mobutu Sese Seko (1965–1997) the railways were neglected. The Lobito line was closed from 1975 by the Angolan Civil War (1975–2002). 800 SNCZ wagons were held in Angola due to the civil war. When the Lobito line closed the Zambian revenue dried up, and SNCZ scaled back on maintenance. Track and equipment deteriorated.

Five different general managers held office between 1976 and 1986. As of 1978 the rail network had been poorly maintained, and had been damaged by the 1977 invasion of Shaba from Angola by rebel Congolese soldiers of the Congolese National Liberation Front (FNLC). In Shaba the track was badly worn, with 80% over 45 years old, and derailments were common. Many of the locomotives were no longer running for lack of spare parts, and 65% of wagons were over 20 years old and needed maintenance.

The World Bank led two projects to upgrade the railway. The first, worth US$20 million, was approved on 29 April 1979 and closed four years behind schedule on 30 June 1986. Its objective was to bring the railway up to reasonably efficient operations, but in fact the railway deteriorated during the project lifespan. The second, worth SDR 25.2 million, was approved on 15 May 1984 and closed three years behind schedule on 31 December 1990. It was meant to prevent the railway from deteriorating further, and to contribute to the Onatra modernization program and to rehabilitation projects for the Matadi and Kinshasa ports. All the funds were paid out, but none of the objectives were met. An ordinance of 3 April 1991 split the SNCZ into four entities. These were SNCZ/Holding, with subsidiaries:

- Office des Chemins de Fer du Sud (OCS)
- Société des Chemins de Fer de l'Est (SFE)
- Office des Chemins de Fer des Uélés (CFU)

== Collapse ==
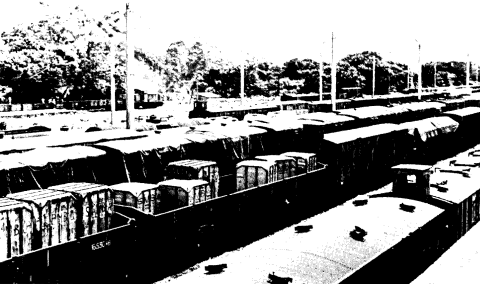
Switching yards in Kamina c. 1983. Almost 20% of SNCZ wagons were over 50 years old. The system largely depended on rented South African wagons.

In the 1990s Gecamines almost ceased to produce copper, while the SNCZ network ceased to function. As of 1993 SNCZ or subsidiaries owned all railway lines in Zaire, including the eastern lines, which were operated by Onatra. This included:

- Branch lines in Shaba that carried ore to concentrate plants, and minerals from these plants to the points where they would be distributed for export.
- The line from Shaba to Ilebo
- The line from Tenke to Sakania, from where exports were routed south via Zambia to South Africa.
- The line from Kamina to Kalemie on Lake Tanganyika, which carried agriculture goods and mineral exports to Tanzania.
- The Northern line, a narrow gauge railway serving the Haut-Zaire and Équateur regions (the Uélé region).

The company also operated the port at Kalemie and transport on Lake Tanganyika, and owned the port of Ilebo on the Kasai.

A World Bank in 1993 blamed the failure of the projects to revive the network on the management of the SNCZ, which used the funds mainly to retain staff and hire new staff rather than to maintain the assets of the railway. The report noted that the railways might not be economically viable. Traffic volumes had been dropping due to reduced production by Gécamines, and political unrest in 1991 had disrupted the economy. The Benguela railway in Angola from Shaba to Lobito might also reopen and divert traffic.

In 1995 prime minister Léon Kengo wa Dondo allowed foreign investment in some of the lines in an attempt to revive them. The Sizarail company was formed with 51% ownership from Belgian and South African investors and 49% government ownership. In November 1995 SNCZ/Holding was dissolved and operation of the railways was ceded to Sizarail. Sizarail invested $6 million in repairs to the lines from Lubumbashi to Ilebo and from Kamina to Kalemie. It earned $66 million gross revenues in its first year, with a profit of $1 million.

In 1997 the Alliance des Forces Démocratiques pour la Libération du Congo (AFDL) began a rebellion, which disrupted Sizarail operations. Sizarail was dissolved in 1997 and all operations were taken over by the Société nationale des chemins de fer du Congo (SNCC). In 1998 the Rassemblement Congolais pour la Démocratie (RCD) began its rebellion. The Second Congo War continued until 2003. When mining began to resume, transport of mineral exports was mostly through the road and rail networks of other southern African countries.

== See also ==
- Rail transport in the Democratic Republic of the Congo

== Sources ==
- Bobb, F. Scott (2010), "Railways", Historical Dictionary of the Democratic Republic of the Congo (PDF) (3 ed.), Scarecrow Press, ISBN 978-0-8108-6325-5
- Director-General Ops Eval (30 June 1993), Memorandum to the Executive Disrector and the President (PDF), World Bank
- N'Lemvo Dedengity, Alain Riche (2008), "Historique de la S.N.C.C.", La problématique de l'audit interne dans la gestion des entreprises publiques en République Démocratique du Congo: Cas de « LA SOCIETE NATIONALE DE CHEMINS DE FER DU CONGO (thesis), Institut supérieur du commerce
- Omasombo Tshonda, Jean (2014), Bas-Uele Pouvoirs locaux et économie agricole : héritages d’un passé brouillé (PDF) (in French), Musée royal de l’Afrique centrale, ISBN 978-9-4916-1586-3
- Pourtier, Roland (2021), "Railroads in Subsaharan Africa, between past days and uncertain reconstructions", Belgian Journal of Geography (1): 189–202, doi:10.4000/belgeo.11266
- U.S. Dept of Commerce (1974), Trading with the U.S.S.R., U.S. Department of Commerce, Domestic and International Business Administration
