= Société nationale des chemins de fer du Congo =

National railway company of the Democratic Republic of the Congo

Société Nationale des chemins de fer du Congo
- Type: Railway company
- Founded: 29 June 2004; 22 years ago
- Area served: Democratic Republic of the Congo
- Website: www.snccsa.com

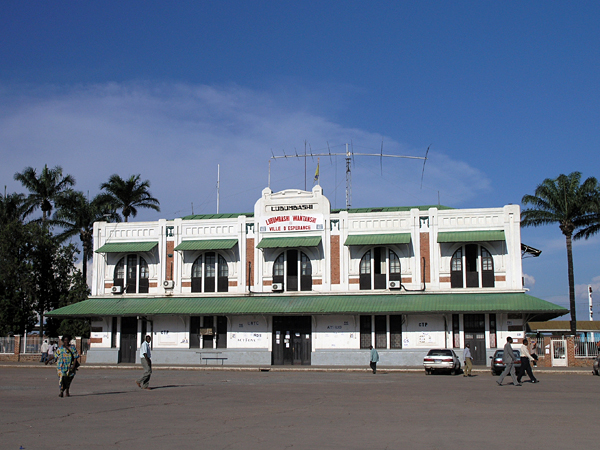
Lubumbashi Central Railway Station

The Société Nationale des chemins de fer du Congo (SNCC; "National Railway Company of the Congo") is the national railway company for the inland railways of the Democratic Republic of the Congo.

== History ==
The railway took over the assets of the Société Nationale des Chemins de Fer Zaïrois (SNCZ; "National Railway Company of Zaire"). Due to the civil war, the railway was not functioning from 1998 until June 29, 2004. During the war, 500 km of railway in the provinces of Maniema and Katanga were destroyed. A million dollar grant from the United States Agency for International Development's Office of Foreign Disaster Assistance is helping to pay for the section's repair. Charities often use the railway to distribute food and other supplies. Despite foreign support, SNCC was again on the brink of collapse in 2010; to prevent this, in June 2010 the World Bank gave a 255 million US dollar grant.

The Matadi-Kinshasa Railway is operated by ONATRA, under an agreement with the CNC.

== Network ==
The railway network of the Belgian Congo, pre-1960

3,641 kilometres (of which 858 kilometres electrified) in Katanga, Kasaï-Occidental, Kasaï-Oriental and Maniema.

Track gauge 1,067 mm (3 ft 6 in) :

- Kamina to Ilebo Only remaining weekly through passenger train is timetabled to take six days. Agreement signed in September 2007 for China to fund an extension to Kinshasa.
- Sakania-Lubumbashi to Kindu (see: Cape to Cairo Railway)
- Tenke (a siding on the Lubumbashi to Ilebo mainline) to Dilolo (Angola border at Luau, rail has connection to the Benguela Railway ending at port of Lobito on the Atlantic Ocean.)
- Kabalo to Kalemie

Track gauge 1,000 mm (3 ft 3 3/8 in) metre gauge:

- Ubundu to Kisangani (portage railway)

== See also ==
- Railway Company of Benguela
- Congo-Ocean Railway
- Rail transport in the Democratic Republic of Congo
- South African Class 32-000
- Chemins de Fer des Grands Lacs
- Transport in the Democratic Republic of the Congo
