= Sizarail =

Private railway company in Zaire (1996-1997)

- Company type: Railway company
- Founded: 1995
- Defunct: 1997
- Area served: Zaire

Sizarail was a railway company formed by foreign investors that briefly operated the railway network in Zaire between 1996 and 1997. It took over from the state-owned operator in an attempt to revive the railway, which had virtually ceased to operate despite being a critical source of revenue from mineral exports. Operations quickly improved, and the company earned a small profit in the first year. However, advancing rebel forces closed it down and re-nationalized the railway.

== Creation ==
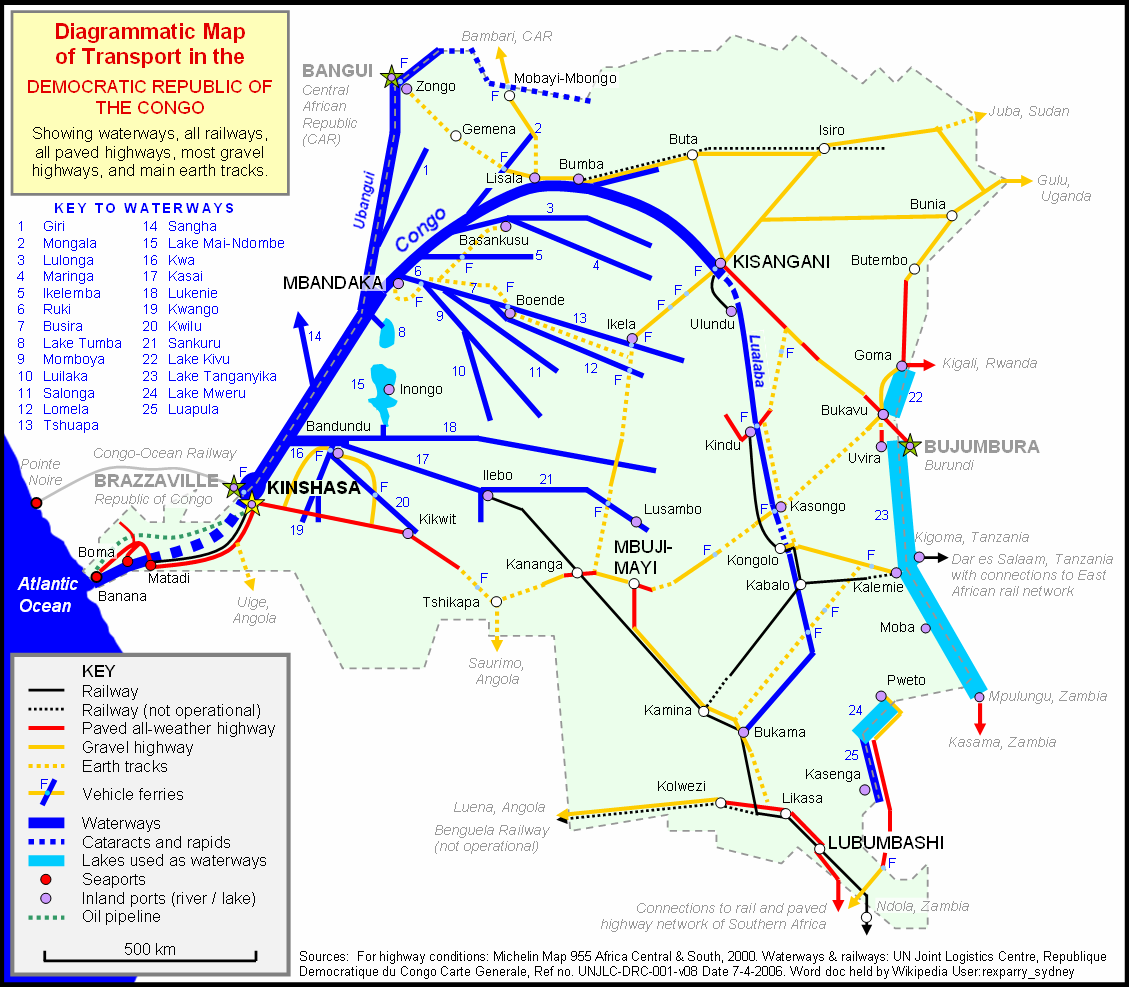
DRC transport map.

In the 1990s the mining company Gécamines almost ceased to produce copper, while the state-owned SNCZ railway network ceased to function. In 1995 prime minister Léon Kengo wa Dondo allowed foreign investment in some of the railway lines in an attempt to revive them. Sizarail was formed in response. It was 51% owned by a joint venture between the state-owned South African company Spoornet and Transurb of Belgium, with 49% held by the state mining companies Gécamines and Societé Minière de Bakwanga, and by Zairean banks. In November 1995 the state railway SNCZ/Holding was dissolved and operation of the national railways was ceded to Sizarail. The South African company Comazar, 64% owned by Bolloré of France, operated the Sizarail network. Spoornet was joint operator The managing director was Patrick Claes. Rolling stock consisted of 10 locomotives worth about $5.61 million, 20 railway trucks and 20 passenger carriages.

== Operations ==
Sizarail invested $6 million in repairs to the lines from Lubumbashi to Ilebo and from Kamina to Kalemie. It earned $66 million gross revenues in its first year, with a profit of $1 million. Sizarail paid regular salaries to its staff, and journeys by rail took days rather than weeks. It reopened the lines to southern Africa for export of Zaire's minerals, key to the economy of the country.

== Closure ==
In 1997 the Alliance des Forces Démocratiques pour la Libération du Congo (AFDL) began a rebellion, which disrupted Sizarail operations. The advancing forces of Laurent-Désiré Kabila closed Sizarail on the basis that the operators were friends of president Mobutu Sese Seko. The result was a backlog of copper and cobalt exports. On 8 May 1997 Spoornet reported that rail operations had halted. The rebels led by Kabila had formed the National Railways of the Congo (CNCC) to take over railway operations on Lubumbashi, the copper mining center. At this stage the rebels were less than 85 kilometres (53 mi) from Kinshasa, while president Mobutu was attending an African summity in Gabon and was not expected to return.

From August 1997 and January 1998, the company's belgian CEO Patrick Claes was arrested by the new Kabila's regime and taken into custody without being specifically charged.

Sizarail was dissolved in 1997 and all operations were taken over by the Société nationale des chemins de fer du Congo (SNCC). On 1 April 1998 it was reported that the government of the Democratic Republic of the Congo had begun to repay a debt of R136m owed to Spoornet. This was to compensate for the seizure of the railway and rolling stock by Kabila's regime.

== See also ==
- Rail transport in the Democratic Republic of the Congo

== Sources ==
- Bobb, F. Scott (2010), "Railways" (PDF), Historical Dictionary of the Democratic Republic of the Congo (3 ed.), Scarecrow Press, ISBN 978-0-8108-6325-5
- Comazar, MBendi, archived from the original on 2007-03-11
- Heale, Jay (October 1998), Democratic Republic of the Congo, Marshall Cavendish, ISBN 978-0-7614-0874-1
- N'Lemvo Dedengity, Alain Riche (2008), "Historique de la S.N.C.C.", La problématique de l'audit interne dans la gestion des entreprises publiques en République Démocratique du Congo: Cas de « LA SOCIETE NATIONALE DE CHEMINS DE FER DU CONGO (thesis), Institut supérieur du commerce
- Pourtier, Roland (2021), "Railroads in Subsaharan Africa, between past days and uncertain reconstructions", Belgian Journal of Geography (1): 189–202, doi:10.4000/belgeo.11266
- "Sizarail seizure settled", Railway Gazette, 1 April 1998
- "Zaire Rlys Halted", Business Standard, 8 May 1997
