= 2016 Eséka train derailment =

Train derailment in Cameroon

- Location within Cameroon

Details
- Date: 21 October 2016; 11:00 WAT
- Location: Eséka, Centre Region
- Coordinates: 03°38′41″N 10°46′17″E
- Country: Cameroon
- Line: Yaoundé - Douala
- Operator: Camrail (Comazar)
- Incident type: Derailment
- Cause: Under investigation

Statistics
- Trains: 1
- Passengers: ~1,300
- Deaths: 79
- Injured: 551

On 21 October 2016, a Camrail inter-city passenger train travelling from Cameroon's capital, Yaoundé, to its largest city, Douala, derailed in Eséka, Centre Region. By 30 October 2016, the official number of casualties had reached 79 dead, with 550 injured. It was the deadliest rail crash on the African continent since the August 2007 Benaleka train accident.

== Background ==
Camrail, which is a subsidiary company of the French Bolloré group, also operates Sitarail, the company that provides rail services in the former French colonies of Burkina Faso and Ivory Coast. Sitarail had a major crash in September 2016 when a bridge collapsed while one of Sitarail's trains travelled across it. The derailment caused the closure of the international rail-link between the West African countries.

The Bolloré group, led by French billionaire Vincent Bolloré (whose son, Cyrille Bolloré, is the director of Bolloré Transports and Logistics and has been responsible for Camrail's operations since January 2016), also has plans to build and operate additional rail lines in French West Africa as part of the West Africa Regional Rail Integration plan.

== Derailment ==
The passenger train involved in the crash was travelling on a Camrail line between the capital, Yaoundé, and the country's largest city and economic hub, Douala. Because of recent heavy rains, a landslide had destroyed a bridge on the main road connecting the two cities, forcing many people to travel by train instead. As a result, Camrail extended the 9-carriage train with eight additional carriages. The number of passengers on board was reported to be around 1,300, more than double the intended capacity of 600 of the unextended train, and the train left Yaoundé at 11:00 local time with a slight delay. A Reuters journalist travelling on the train reported a loud noise and smoke as several of the carriages derailed around midday local time (11:00 GMT) in Eséka, about 120 km (75 mi) west of the capital.

Victims were transported to a local hospital in Eséka, as well as to facilities in Douala. Social media images showed several carriages overturned on a slope beside the rail line, as hundreds of passengers looked on. Because of the derailment and the earlier bridge collapse, Cameroon's main transportation axis was severed.

== Investigation ==
In the immediate aftermath of the crash, Camrail announced they will send investigative teams to the site, and expressed their condolences to the victims' families in a post on the company's official Facebook page. Rail officials said that prior to the train's departure from Yaoundé, eight additional carriages were added to the normally nine-car train in order to accommodate additional passengers, but it was not immediately known if that had caused or contributed to the crash.

On the Tuesday following the crash a Cameroonian court announced that they would begin an investigation into who was at fault for the crash. The following day Bolloré's Africa Chairman announced that the train had been traveling above the speed limit when it crashed.

=== Government commissioned reports ===
The Cameroonian Government commissioned four reports to evaluate the cause of the derailment and planned to release their own findings in a separate report. Reuters reported that at least one of the four confidential investigations found that Camrail had "total and entire responsibility" for crash and that the railroad had improperly inspected the train before its doomed journey. The report found that of the 17 carriages on the train, 13 had malfunctioning braking systems and that Camrail administrators ignored warnings from Camrail personnel before the crash.

== See also ==
- 2014 Katanga train derailment, a similar 2014 accident in the Democratic Republic of the Congo that killed 48
- List of rail accidents (2010–2019)
- Rail transport in Cameroon
