= 2014 Katanga train derailment =

Train derailment in the Democratic Republic of the Congo

Details
- Date: 22 April 2014 between 10:00 and 11:00 local time (UTC+2:00)
- Location: Near Katongola Bridge 8°23′30″S 24°39′49″E
- Country: Democratic Republic of the Congo
- Line: Kamina – Ilebo
- Operator: Société nationale des Chemins de fer du Congo
- Incident type: Derailment
- Cause: Driving over speed limit

Statistics
- Trains: 1
- Deaths: 48
- Injured: 162

On 22 April 2014, a freight train derailed near the Katongola Bridge in Haut-Lomami Province of the Democratic Republic of the Congo. The train was carrying hundreds of illegal passengers at the time of the crash. As a result, 48 people were killed and over 160 injured.

== Background ==
The rail system of the Democratic Republic of the Congo (DRC) is poorly maintained and has fallen into a state of disrepair after years of conflict within the country. Much of the system was built during the colonial period and received few upgrades since the end of Belgian rule in 1960 until a recent program financed by the World Bank. Employees of the Congo Railway Company (SNCC), the country's public rail company, often sell illegal tickets to passengers to boost their income. Other people simply hop on trains as they travel to get around the country. Train crashes are fairly frequent as a result of the overloading and poor infrastructure. In 2007, more than 100 people were killed when a freight train derailed in Kasai Occidental.

== Derailment ==
Derailment site (Democratic Republic of the Congo)

Between 10:00 and 11:00 local time (8:00–9:00 UTC) on 22 April 2014, a freight train derailed near Katongola, about 65 kilometres (40 mi) north of Kamina in the Haut-Lomami Province, Democratic Republic of the Congo. The derailment included the train's two engines and 15 of 19 carriages.

Although not a passenger train, it was carrying hundreds of passengers at the time of the crash. According to eyewitnesses, the train was filled with passengers both on the inside and on the roofs of the train cars. Although the crash occurred in the morning, rescuers did not arrive on scene until the early evening. Army medics and MONUSCO personnel were aided by a heavy crane in their efforts to free people trapped under piles of debris. Initial reports said as many as 63 people had been killed in the accident, but the death toll was later revised to 48. An additional 160 people were injured, 12 of them seriously.

== Cause ==
The initial investigation suggested that the train was traveling at about 60 kilometres per hour (37 mph), which is above the 40 kilometres per hour (25 mph) speed limit. The train was unable to slow sufficiently to get around a curve in the track and derailed. According to a government spokesman, the train apparently was speeding because of an engine failure.

== See also ==
- List of rail accidents (2010–2019)
