= Battle of Kabalo =

Battle of the Congo Crisis

- Part of the Congo Crisis
- Kabalo (Democratic Republic of the Congo)
Date	7–11 April 1961
Location	Kabalo and surrounding area, State of Katanga
Result	ONUC/Luba victory

Belligerents
(United Nations) ONUC: Ethiopia; Luba militia	Katanga

Commanders and leaders
(United Nations) Alemu	William Richard Browne (POW); R. Wauthier

Strength
400 ONUC troops Unknown number of Baluba	1,000+ troops

Casualties and losses
5 ONUC soldiers killed 4 ONUC soldiers wounded Unknown Luba casualties	Unknown gendarmes killed 3 gendarmes wounded 30 mercenaries captured 1 armed ferry sunk

The Battle of Kabalo was fought at Kabalo by United Nations peacekeeping forces and Baluba militias from 7 April to 11 April 1961 against mercenaries and the gendarmerie of the State of Katanga, a secessionist state rebelling against the Republic of the Congo in central Africa. The Katangese forces attacked the town as part of a larger offensive meant to restore their authority in northern Katanga which was challenged by the Baluba. A United Nations Operation in the Congo peacekeeping contingent garrisoning Kabalo, acting under the authority of their mandate to prevent civil war in the country, resisted the initial attack and arrested 30 mercenaries in Katanga's employ. Armed Baluba repelled a Katangese ferry carrying troops as well as an armoured train. The next day the ferry returned but was sunk by UN forces. Fighting continued over the next few days between the Baluba and Katangese until the latter withdrew. The battle led to a deterioration of relations between the Katangese government and the United Nations Operation in the Congo.

== Background ==
=== Katangese secession ===
The Republic of the Congo became independent from Belgium on 30 June 1960. On 5 July, disgruntled soldiers of the Force Publique, unhappy with their lack of advancement relative to civilian politicians, began a nationwide mutiny against their white officers. The rebellions caused widespread instability and led to the flight of much of the Congo's European population, which was of vital importance to the economy. On July 9 the mutinies spread to the southern province of Katanga. Katanga contained the vast majority of the Congo's valuable mineral resources and had attracted significant mining activity under Belgian rule. Many Katangese thought that they were entitled to the revenue generated through the lucrative industry, and feared that under the new central government led by Prime Minister Patrice Lumumba it would be redistributed among the Congo's poorer provinces.

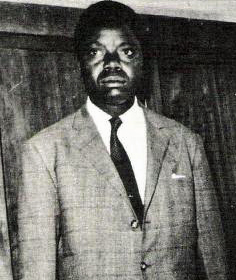
Moïse Tshombe in 1962

On 11 July Belgian metropolitan units were landed across the Congo, without the Congolese government's consent, to disarm the mutinous troops. Moïse Tshombe, President of Katanga Province, declared the independence of the "State of Katanga" and appealed for Belgian assistance. Immediately following the declaration of secession, the Katangese government worked to quickly establish its own armed force. Belgian officers and Katangese rank-and-file of the Force Publique formed the nucleus of the new Katangese Gendarmerie, bolstered by the recruitment of local militias.

Lumumba and President Joseph Kasa-Vubu appealed to the United Nations (UN), requesting that international troops be dispatched to the Congo to replace the Belgian forces and reestablish order. The UN Security Council complied, passing several resolutions calling for the withdrawal of Belgian troops and establishing a large multinational peacekeeping mission, the United Nations Operation in the Congo (known by its French acronym, ONUC). Lumumba demanded that ONUC troops be used to forcibly put down the Katangese secession, but the Security Council resolved that "the United Nations Force in the Congo will not be a party to or in any way intervene in or be used to influence the outcome of any internal conflict." Frustrated, Lumumba appealed to Eastern Bloc nations for military assistance, resulting in a conflict with Kasa-Vubu and ultimately his removal from power in September and eventual murder in January 1961. In response to Lumumba's removal, his political allies gathered in Stanleyville in the eastern Congo and declared a rival regime to the central government in Léopoldville.

The announcement of Lumumba's death created a sense of urgency among the international community and motivated members of the UN Security Council to strengthen ONUC's powers. On 21 February 1961 the UN Security Council passed a resolution permitting ONUC to use military force as a last resort to prevent civil war. As the Congo was already more-or-less in a state of civil war, the resolution gave ONUC significant latitude to act. It also called for the immediate departure of all foreign military personnel and mercenaries from the country, though the use of force was not authorised to carry out that specific measure. Therefore, force could only be used to remove foreign soldiers and mercenaries if it was justified under the reasoning that such action would be necessary to prevent civil war. ONUC Headquarters implemented the resolution by adopting Operational Directive No. 10, which stated that UN troops "should at the earliest opportunity attempt either to interpose themselves between the parties [of an armed conflict] to stop or limit the clash. In doing so, they continue to have the right to defend themselves by force if necessary". ONUC was not authorised to impose a political solution by force or directly intervene in internal Congolese affairs.

=== Conflict in northern Katanga ===
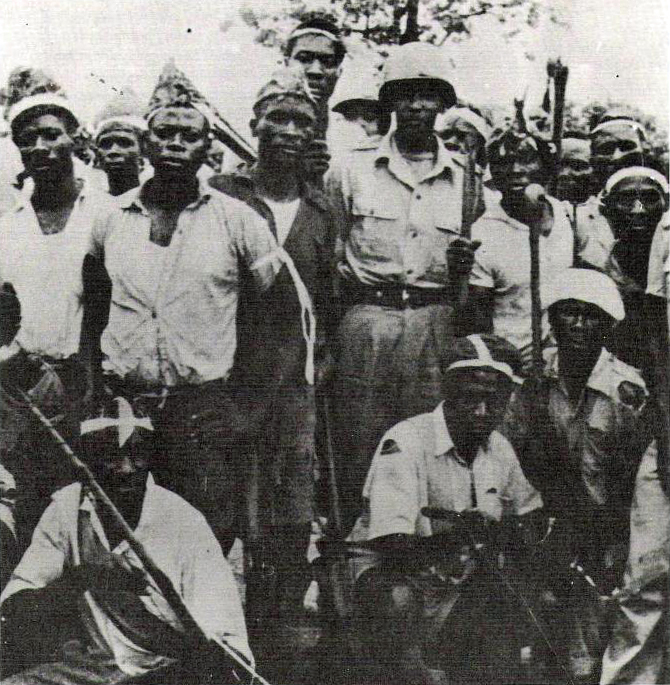
Armed Baluba fought against the Katangese secession.

The secession of Katanga was opposed by the Association Générale des Baluba du Katanga (BALUBAKAT) a political party which represented the Luba people of northern Katanga. Some prominent BALUBAKAT politicians allied themselves with the Stanleyville government. On 7 January 1961 troops from Stanleyville occupied Manono in northern Katanga. Accompanying BALUBAKAT leaders declared the establishing of a new "Province of Lualaba" that extended throughout the region. Since October 1960, northern Katanga was ostensibly a "neutral zone" under the control of ONUC contingents, but in reality they were too weak to exercise authority and were completely surprised by the takeover in Manono. Tshombe and his government accused ONUC of collaborating with the Stanleyville regime and declared that they would no longer respect the neutral zone. By late January groups of Baluba were launching attacks on railways. UN officials appealed for them to stop, but the Baluba leaders stated that they aimed to do everything within their power to weaken the Katangese government and disrupt the Katangese Gendarmerie's offensive potential.

On 11 February 1961, the Katangese government announced that it would begin an offensive to eliminate the Baluba opposition in northern Katanga. Approximately 5,000 troops were earmarked for the operation, which focused on a northward offensive from Lubudi. At the same time, they were to recapture the town of Manono, secure the area south of it, and launch attacks on Kabalo from Albertville to the east and Kongolo to the north. Kabalo served as a port for steamers along the Lualaba River and was connected to the railway from Albertville. The Katangese government disregarded the UN Security Council resolution of 21 February and carried forward with its plans to suppress rebellious Baluba in the northern sections of the province. On 30 March the Katangese Gendarmerie seized Manono. After the town's fall the BALUBAKAT designated Kabalo the "provisional capital" of the Province of Lualaba. About 3,500 Baluba from the surrounding area fled to Kabalo, where they were granted ONUC's protection.

== Prelude ==
The Katangese operation to take Kabalo was organised by Colonel Jean-Marie Crèvecoeur and was chiefly intended to secure the railway. Captain William Richard Browne was to lead a group of 30 mercenaries of the Compagnie Internationale, a Katangese mercenary unit mostly composed of Brits and South Africans, in landing at the Kabalo airstrip via Douglas DC-4, followed by three more planes carrying gendarmes and additional mercenaries. At the same time, a ferry, the Constant de Burlet, carrying Katangese gendarmes with Belgian officers and members of the Compagnie Internationale under Captain R. Wauthier would arrive, as would an armoured train transporting more gendarmes and Compagnie Internationale men. According to two gendarmes later captured by the Baluba, the ferry carried 150 African gendarmes, four white gendarmes, and 11 crewmen. The entire attack force consisted of over 1,000 men. On 27 March the armoured train departed Albertville, collected about 350 gendarmes, and proceeded in the direction of Nyunzu, towards Kabalo. Katangese troops advancing from Kongolo burnt Luba villages as they advanced.

Kabalo was garrisoned by two companies of an Ethiopian battalion serving with ONUC, totaling 400 troops. It was led by Colonel Alemu. According to Katangese mercenary Jerry Puren, ONUC had been warned in advance of the attack when a Belgian officer handed a copy of the Katangese battle plan to UN officials in Léopoldville. One injured BALUBAKAT partisan retreated to Kabalo and reported of fighting in the north.

== Battle ==
On 7 April 1961, the Katangese DC-4 carrying Browne and his mercenaries launched from Kongolo and landed at the Kabalo airstrip at about 10:30 unopposed. The mercenaries disembarked and the plane took off. They then ran to secure the railway station, but found that 200 Ethiopian soldiers had taken up position around the location and trained their guns on them. The mercenaries surrendered to them. They were arrested and imprisoned in the railway station. The next plane circled the airstrip but did not land and ultimately none of the additional aircraft attempted to do so. At about 13:10, the Constant de Burlet attempted to dock at Kabalo but was taken under fire by Baluba partisans positioned on the opposite side of the river. The gendarmes aboard returned fire with machine guns and mortars, killing at least one Muluba and wounding another before withdrawing behind a bend in the river. Baluba also attacked the armoured train at Kitule, 35 kilometers north of Kabalo. Though seven Baluba reportedly died and three were wounded, they inflicted some casualties among the gendarmes and prevented the train from reaching its objective. The Ethiopians then dispatched a patrol to investigate the engagement at the river, which was ambushed by Katangese gendarmes. Three Ethiopians—an officer and two soldiers—were gravely wounded, while a fourth became separated from the patrol. Despite the gendarmerie's failures, the Katangese government declared that its forces had secured Kabalo.

On the morning of 8 April the Ethiopians sent out a patrol to search for their missing soldier. The gendarmes launched another ambush at a bridge eight miles outside of Kabalo, killing two. The Ethiopians managed to wound and capture three gendarmes. The missing soldier was later brought back to the ONUC contingent by Baluba. Meanwhile, the Constant de Burlet made another attempt to dock and was brought under fire from Baluba militia. The Ethiopian troops also fired on the ferry, and sank it when one of their mortar shells landed down the funnel and blew it up. A Katangese boat retrieved the survivors further down the river. One of the mercenaries claimed that an ONUC soldier shot a priest that was accompanying them when he swam to shore and pleaded for a ceasefire. According to Browne, Ethiopians troops at the railway stationed were angered by the death of their two comrades at the bridge, and a lieutenant brought the mercenaries out of their confinement and prepared to execute them with a firing squad. Colonel Alemu arrived and, after accosting the lieutenant, sent the mercenaries back into the station. A Katangese aircraft flew around Kabalo before bombing an outlying village, setting it ablaze. That evening the Baluba and Katangese gendarmes clashed with each other approximately 10 kilometres south of the town.

The ONUC garrison played no further role in the fighting after 8 April. The Katangese made numerous attempts to enter Kabalo during the following days, but were bogged down by heavy resistance from Baluba militia. A number of Baluba villages east of the town were reportedly torched by CONAKAT partisans. On 10 April ONUC flew in an additional Ethiopian company and 400 Malayan peacekeepers to reinforce the garrison. They also transferred the captive mercenaries to Kamina Air Base. On 11 April a gendarmerie helicopter landed near the town and fired on local fishermen, wounding one. Fighting between the Baluba and gendarmes reportedly resulted in the deaths of five of the latter. That day Katangese troops withdrew from the area to focus their operations further south.

== Aftermath ==
Luba casualties from the battle were unknown. Five UN soldiers were killed and four wounded. The ONUC troops arrested 30 white mercenaries, while three Katangese gendarmes were wounded and an unknown number killed. The wounded gendarmes—two of which were of European descent—were treated by ONUC personnel before being flown to Albertville. ONUC interrogated the captured mercenaries. Browne testified that he had only signed up for policing duties and had been "sold up the river" by the Belgian officers in the Katangese Gendarmerie. All admitted participating in the capture of Manono, and the information they provided revealed to ONUC the extent to which Katanga had been recruiting mercenaries in southern Africa; recruiting stations were present in both Rhodesia and South Africa. Following questioning, the mercenaries were transferred to Léopoldville before being deported from the Congo to Brazzaville. The capture of the mercenaries was given a great deal of public attention and affirmed that British nationals had been working in Katanga's employ. In response the United Kingdom government declared that any British national engaged in a military capacity in the Congo outside of service with ONUC would have their passport invalidated.

Due to the action of the ONUC garrison, Kabalo remained the only major town in northern Katanga not controlled by the Katangese Gendarmerie at the conclusion of their offensive. Though ONUC was able to retain control of the locale, it lacked the ability to patrol the surrounding area to intervene in further conflicts. Having been defeated, the Katangese began conducting punitive attacks on Luba villages. Opposed only by poorly armed bands of Baluba, the conflict resulted in the commission of numerous atrocities by both belligerents. Puren attributed the defeat of the attack on Kabalo to the alleged leak of the battle plan to ONUC and Browne's decision to surrender his force instead of resisting the Ethiopians until reinforcements arrived.

The ONUC garrison's resistance to the attack at Kabalo and the arrest of the mercenaries marked peacekeepers' first use of the powers granted to them under the UN Security Council resolution of 21 February. In response to a parliamentary inquiry, the Lord Privy Seal of the United Kingdom wrote that it was the position of the British government that ONUC's action at Kabalo was authorised under the Security Council resolution.

The battle heightened tensions between the UN and the Katangese government. Tshombe penned a letter of protest to Hammarskjöld, accusing the Ethiopians of acting contrary to ONUC's mandate. He also maintained that Katangese gendarmes had only fired upon the ONUC contingent because they wore khaki. He finished by saying, "If the UN units in Katanga do not stop provoking incidents in a country that only desires to work in peace the Katangese government will be obliged to contemplate other measures, whose consequences will be the entire responsibility of certain elements in the United Nations who are pursuing a personal policy in the former Belgian Congo." Tshombe also put further pressure on ONUC contingents in Katanga by encouraging public demonstrations against them and ordering local businesses not to serve ONUC personnel. The failure of the UN to convince the Katangese to peaceably dispel mercenaries from its forces led ONUC to commission Operation Rum Punch in August.
