= Luao River =

- Location within Democratic Republic of the Congo

Location
- Countries: Democratic Republic of the Congo, Angola
- Provinces: Moxico, Angola, Lualaba, DRC

Physical characteristics
- Mouth
  - location: Kasai River
  - coordinates: 10.598500°S 22.311109°E

Basin features
- River system: Kasai River

The Luao River forms part of the boundary between Angola and the Democratic Republic of the Congo. It is a right tributary of the Kasai River.

== Location ==
The Luao River flows from south to north along the border between Moxico Province of Angola and Lualaba Province of the Democratic Republic of the Congo (DRC). It flows between the towns of Luau in Angola and Dilolo in the DRC.

== Border settlement ==
The border agreement between Portugal and Belgium of 25 May 1891 defined part of the border as being a tributary of the Kasai up to Lago Dilolo. However, it was discovered that Lago Dilolo drained southeast into the Zambezi watershed rather than north to the Kasai. The Portuguese claimed that the Luao tributary of the Kasai should be taken as the boundary, while the Belgians were in favor of the Luacano River, a tributary of the Kasai farther to the west. Eventually Belgium ceded a large area west of the Luau River in an exchange of territories agreed on 22 July 1927. In return for the "Dilolo Hook", Belgium gained a smaller area to the northwest which opened an easier railway route from Matadi to Léopoldville.

== Railway bridge ==
A bridge carries the Benguela railway and the EN230 highway across the river between Luau and Dililo. The Benguela railway, built by a subsidiary of Tanganyika Concessions, was completed from Lobito on the Atlantic coast to Dilolo in August 1928. It took another 22 months to complete the 324 miles (521 km) line from Dilolo to Tenke, where it connected with the Katanga network run by the Compagnie du chemin de fer du bas-Congo au Katanga (BCK). The line was officially opened on 1 July 1931.

== Sources ==
- Ball, Peter (11 January 2015), "Benguela - More than just a current", The Heritage Portal, archived from the original on 24 September 2015
- Tanks Group Archive, John Rylands Research Institute and Library
- The Geographer (1972), "Angola-Zaire Boundary", International Boundary Study, US Department of State
- "Way History: Luao (159813487)", OpenStreetMap
