= KDL =

KDL may refer to:

== Technology ==
- Kernel Debugging Land, in Haiku (operating system)
- Cuddly Document Language, a document language like XML or YAML
- Kriegsdampflokomotive (KDL), a steam locomotive class of Kriegslokomotive

== Facilities ==
- Kärdla Airport, Estonia (IATA:KDL)
- Kent District Library, Michigan, USA

== Organizations ==
- Compagnie des Chemins de fer Katanga-Dilolo-Léopoldville, a Belgian Congolese rail company
- Kentucky Data Link, Inc. (KDL), a USA fiber optic services provider acquired by Windstream Holdings
- Kerry District League, Irish football association league
- A former UPN TV station in Branson, MO, USA

== Others ==
- Kevin de León (born 1996), American politician
- Kidal (KDL), Mali, Africa
- Kirby's Dream Land, a 1992 video game
