= LKD =

LKD may refer to:

- Société des Chemins de fer Léopoldville-Katanga-Dilolo (LKD) in the Belgian Congo
- Lithuanian Christian Democrats
