= Sacandica =

Coordinates: 5°59′S 15°57′E

- commune
- Location in Angola
- Country: Angola
- Province: Uíge
- Time zone: UTC+1 (WAT)

Sacandica is a town and commune of Angola, located in the province of Uíge, adjacent to the border with the Democratic Republic of the Congo.

== See also ==
- Communes of Angola
