= Camrail locomotive fleet =

The Camrail locomotive fleet is a fleet of diesel locomotives operated by Camrail which is the operator for the Cameroon Railway system, which is 1000 mm gauge. Not all locomotives in a class remain in service; some locomotives have been on loan.

== Camrail Locomotive fleet ==
class	axles	Power hp	high number	fleet size	built	maker	remarks
BB1000	Bo-Bo	800	1039	1		Locotracteurs Gaston Moyse	Grey-Green Shunter
BB1100	Bo-Bo	870	BB1114	14		Alstom	Red
BB1200	Bo-Bo	1200	BB1210	3		Alstom	Red
CC22	Co-Co	2200	CC2232	32		Bombardier MX620 (CC2201-CC2232)	Remarks
CC25	Co-Co	2500	CC2502	2	2014	NRE	
CC26	Co-Co	hp1	CC2606	6		General Motors	Red
CC33	Co-Co	3300	CC3305AC	5		xx4	Red
GND	Co-Co		GND003	0		xx5	Rem
GPR3000	Co-Co		GPR30-07	9	2015	Grindrod	Red
ZE 504M	Bo'2+2'2'		ZE 505	5		Alstom	DMU
Total; Co-Co; Bo-Bo				. 53; 18			

- Fleet 1
- Fleet 2
- Fleet 3
- Gallery

== See also ==
- Camrail
- Rail transport in Cameroon#Rolling stock
