= Camrail =

Cameroonian railway company

- System map

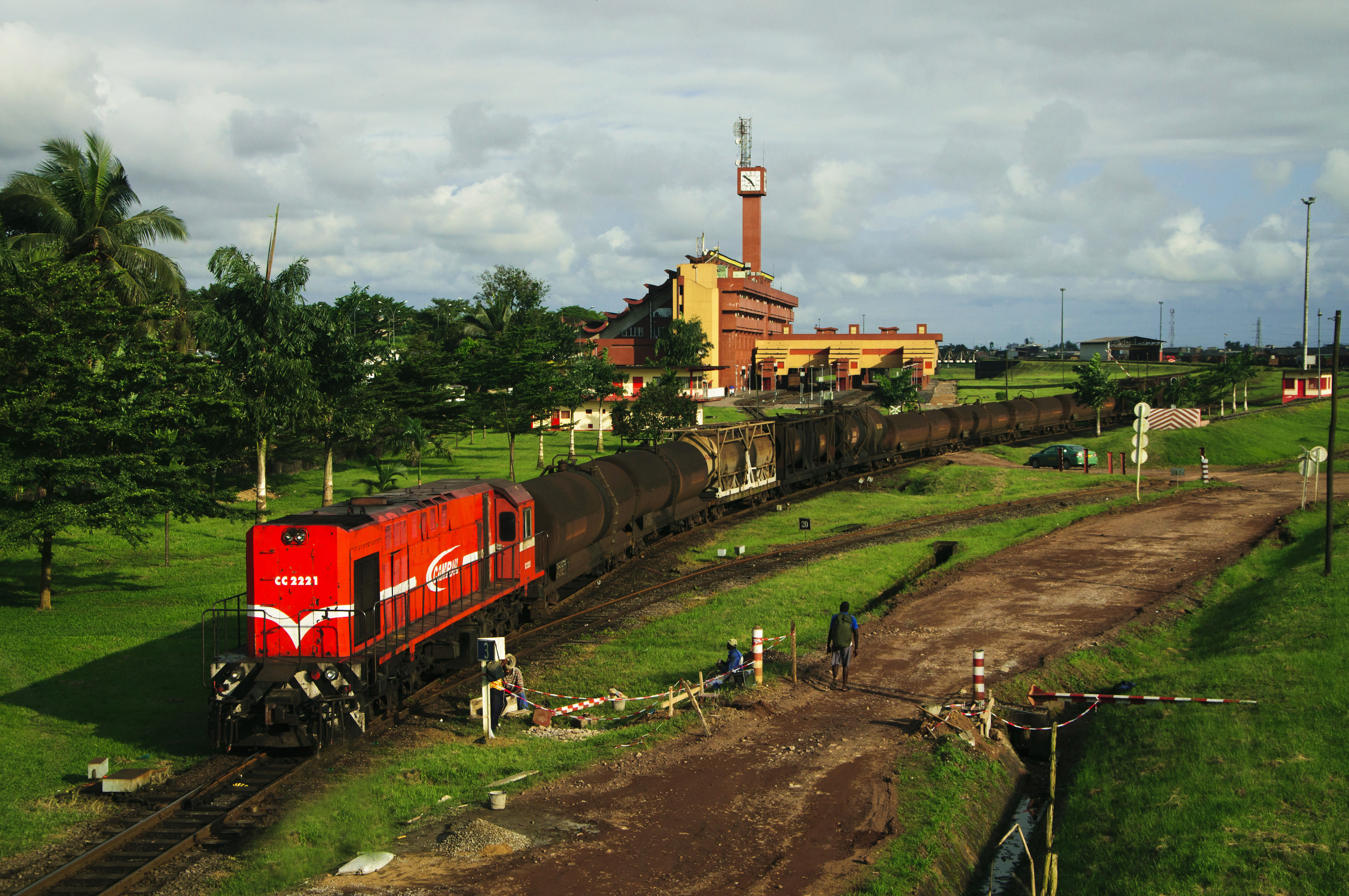

Overview
- Headquarters: Douala
- Dates of operation: 1999–present
- Successor: Régie nationale des chemins de fer du Cameroun

Technical
- Track gauge: 1,000 mm (3 ft 3 3/8 in) metre gauge
- Length: 1,000 kilometres (621 mi)

Other
- Website: www.camrail.net

Camrail is a company operating passenger and freight traffic between the two largest cities in Cameroon and several smaller cities. The company was formed in 1999 and granted a 20-year concession to operate the Cameroon National Railway. The company is a subsidiary of French investment group Bolloré and the railway has been operated by Comazar, a subsidiary of Bolloré, since 1999. According to the Comazar website, the government of Cameroon owns the track while the rolling stock is owned by Camrail.

According to a report by the World Bank in 2011, Camrail ranked relatively high amongst African countries for productivity indicators and was considered a regional leader in terms of implementing a concession to a non-state operator. The 2016 Eséka train derailment took place on Camrail tracks and the company was under investigation by the government and was sued by relatives of the 79 passengers who died in the crash.

== Services ==
=== Passenger ===
As of May 2014, Camrail operated regular daily services on three routes:

- Douala–Kumba
- Douala–Yaoundé
- Yaoundé–Ngaoundéré

=== Freight ===
In 2021, the track including bridges are being upgraded to carry increased bauxite traffic from the Minim, Martap deposits. In the initial stages 5Mt of ore would be carried per annum. A link to the new deepwater port at Kribi is anticipated, requiring a link line from Edéa of about 130 km in length. The mining company concerned is Canyon Resources.

A line between Ngaoundéré and Chad's capital city may start around 2026-2027.This will boost Cameroon and Chad's economic trade

== Characteristics ==
=== Gauge ===
- 1,104 km of 1,000 mm (3 ft 3 3/8 in) gauge track (1995 est.).

=== Loading Gauge ===
- Vertical
- Horizontal

=== Sleepers ===
- mainly concrete sleeper

=== Axle load ===
- Stage 1 upgrade to 25T completed in 2019.

=== Couplers ===
- SA3 for locomotive hauled rolling stock
- Scharfenberg coupler for multiple unit passenger trains

=== Gradients ===
- 1.6% (1 in 63) in loaded and empty directions.

=== Crossing Loops ===
- Average spacing about 40 km.

=== Bridges ===
- 13 bridges renewed

=== Communications ===
- Fibre optic cable

=== Colour scheme ===
- primarily red
- one shunting/branch line loco green and yellow

== Rolling stock ==
- Locomotives: 50
- Railroad cars: 1299
- DMU ~~

== Accidents ==
On 21 October 2016 at approximately 1100 local time, a passenger train derailed close to the town of Eséka. The train, traveling from the capital Yaoundé to the country's main port and economic hub, (Douala), was crammed with people because of road traffic disruption between the two cities and came off the tracks just before reaching Eséka. 79 people were killed and nearly 600 injured. The investigation of the accident revealed that not only speeding but also a dilapidated fleet of equipment and rolling stock of Camrail were the cause of the accident. The express train connection on the route was relaunched in 2021.

== Timeline ==
- Camrail-Canyon Resources cooperation

== See also ==
- Camrail locomotive fleet
