= Dilolo Airport =

- IATA: none; ICAO: FZSI

Summary
- Airport type: Public
- Serves: Dilolo
- Elevation AMSL: 3,378 ft / 1,030 m
- Coordinates: 10°45′30″S 22°20′35″E

Map
- Location of the airport in Democratic Republic of the Congo

Runways
Direction	Length		Surface
Direction	m	ft	Surface
16/34	1,820	5,971	Dirt
- Sources: GCM Google Maps

Dilolo Airport (ICAO: FZSI) is an airstrip in Dilolo, Lualaba Province, Democratic Republic of the Congo. The runway is 7.5 kilometres (4.7 mi) south of the town, near the Angola border.

== See also ==
- Transport in the Democratic Republic of the Congo
- List of airports in the Democratic Republic of the Congo
