= Empresa do Caminho de Ferro de Benguela-E.P. =

State owned Angolan railway company

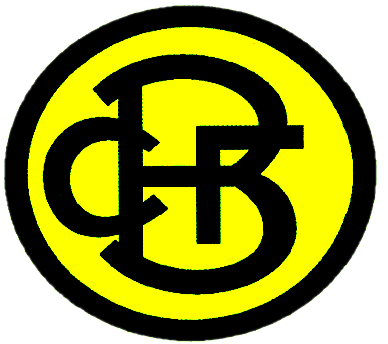
The ECFB-EP logo.

The Empresa do Caminho de Ferro de Benguela-E.P. (ECFB-EP; in English: Railway Company of Benguela) is an Angolan state-owned company responsible for the administration of the Angolan stretch of the Benguela Railway. The company's headquarters are in the city of Lobito.

Between 1902 and 2001 the company was a private limited company, later a limited liability company (SARL), constituted to build and operate the Benguela Railway concession, granted by the Portuguese government through a contract dated 28 November 1902, and approved by decree on the same date. This contract, known as the "Williams Contract", was concluded between the Government of Portugal, represented by António Teixeira de Sousa, who was at the time Minister of the Navy and Overseas, and the Scottish engineer Robert Williams, who in exchange for the concession guarantees was obliged to build and operate a railway line from the port of Lobito to the eastern border of Angola, and respective branches in Angolan territory. Under the terms of that contract, the exploration concession was valid for 99 years and ended on 28 November 2001, reverting to the Angolan State, as successor to the Portuguese State in the respective contract, all fixed and current means of the company.

On 6 September 2003, the Angolan government decreed the re-creation of the company, changing its name to "Railway Company of Benguela-E.P.", in short ECFB-EP, and managed by a Board of Directors appointed by the President of the Republic.

== See also ==
- National Railway Company of the Congo
