= Cape to Cairo Railway =

Proposed but never completed railway connecting British colonies in eastern Africa

Cairo–Cape railway

Overview
- Status: Only a few stretches in operation 5,625 kilometres (3,495 mi)
- Termini: Cape Town, South Africa; Port Said, Egypt

Service
- Type: Heavy rail

Technical
- Line length: 10,489 km (6,518 mi)
- Track gauge: 1,435 mm (4 ft 8 1/2 in) standard gauge 1,067 mm (3 ft 6 in) Cape gauge

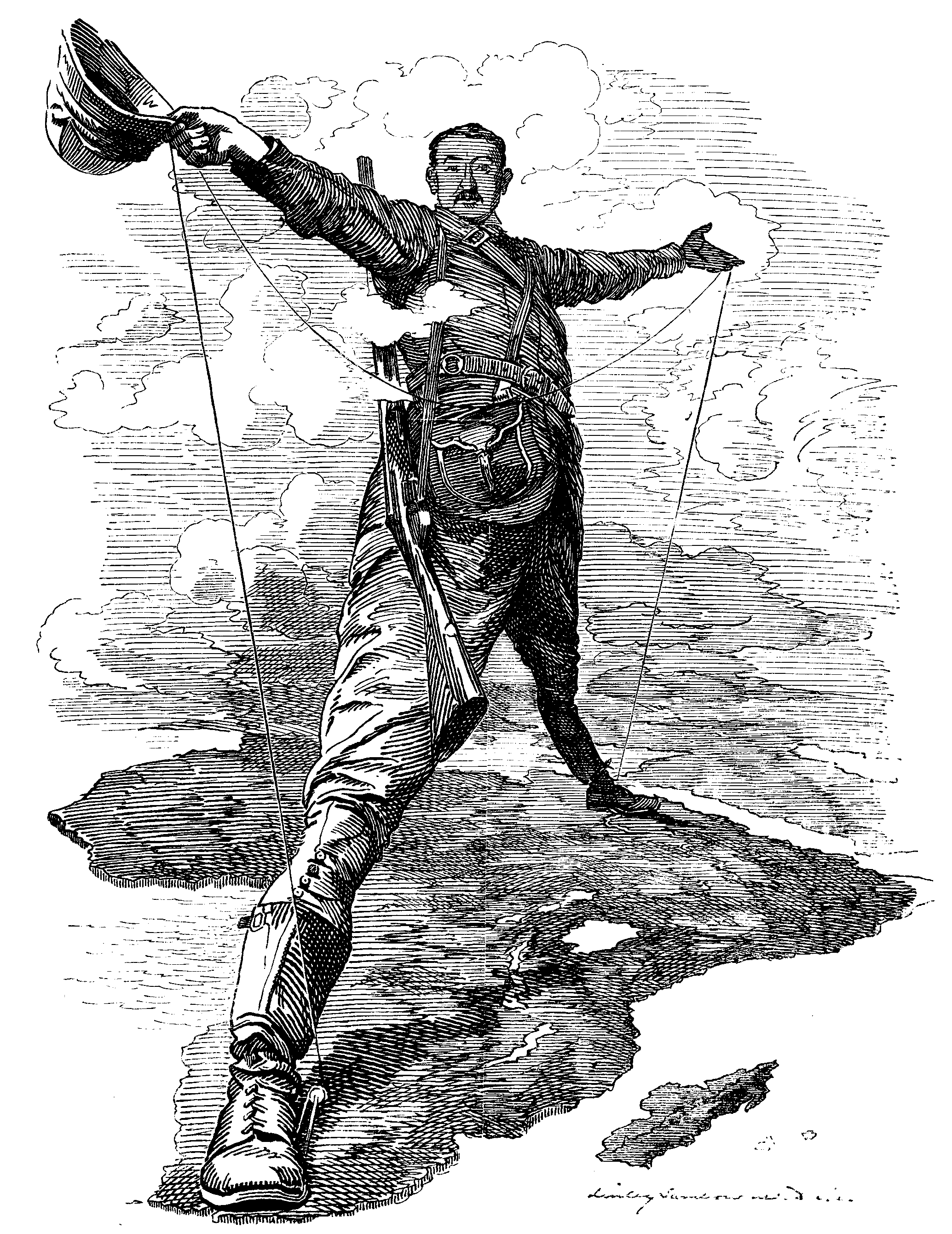
The Rhodes Colossus: Caricature of Cecil John Rhodes, after he announced plans for a telegraph line and railway from Cape Town to Cairo.

Under British control or influence, 1914 This map shows the chain of colonies from the Cape to Cairo through which the railway would run. From 1916, Tanganyika Territory was added, filling in the gap.

Overview of routes discussed. Not all links displayed were finished.

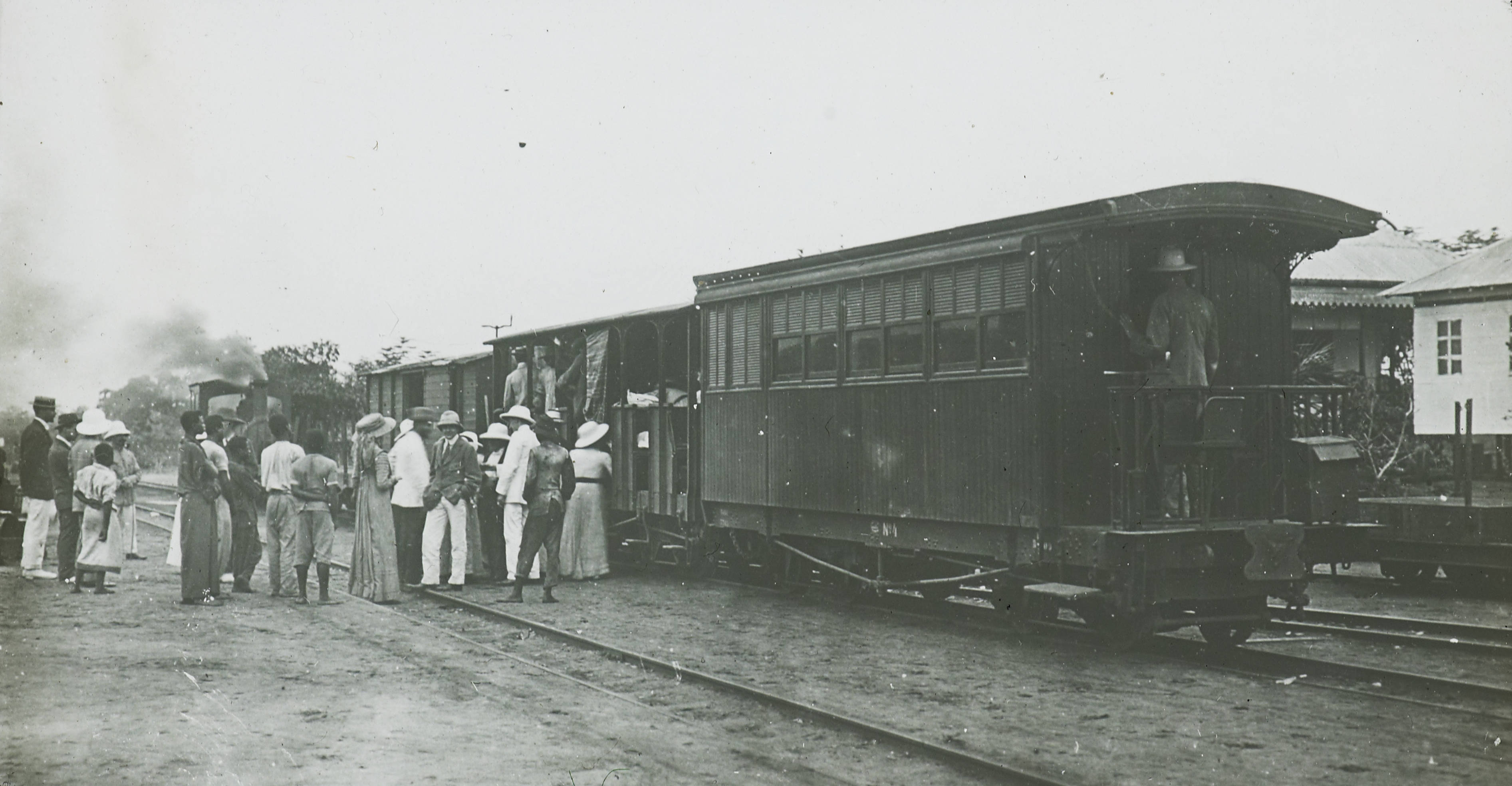
Boarding Cape to Cairo Railway in the Belgian Congo, c. 1900–1915

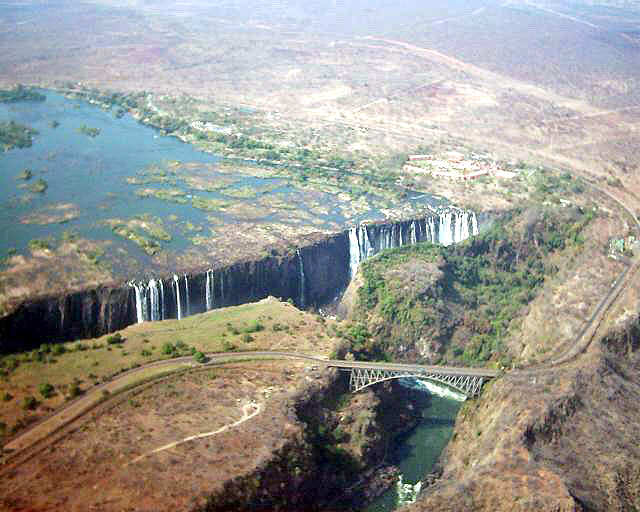
Crossing at Victoria Falls

The Cape to Cairo Railway is an unfinished project to create a railway line from southern to northern Africa. It would have been the largest and most important railway on the continent. It was planned as a link between Cape Town in South Africa and Port Said in Egypt.

The project was never completed. Completed parts have been inoperative for many years, as a result of wars and lack of maintenance by the former colonies and current governments.

The plan was initiated at the end of the 19th century, during the time of Western European colonial rule. It was largely based on the vision of Cecil Rhodes, an attempt to connect African colonies of the British Empire through a continuous railway line from Cape Town, South Africa to Cairo, Egypt.

== Proposal and strategy ==
The original proposal for a Cape Town to Cairo railway was made in 1874 by Edwin Arnold, then the editor of The Daily Telegraph. The proposal for a railroad connecting Cairo with the Cape of Good Hope was later promoted by Cecil Rhodes, who enthused that such a railway could join up the possessions of the British Empire. Lacking government funding, private investors constructed a substantial part of the railroad. However, construction began to stall in the 1920s when air cargo and low cost ship transport provided viable alternatives.

France had a somewhat rival strategy in the late 1890s to link its western and eastern African colonies, namely Senegal to French Somaliland. Southern Sudan and Ethiopia were in the way, but France sent expeditions in 1897 to establish a protectorate in southern Sudan and to find a route across Ethiopia. The scheme foundered when a British flotilla on the Nile confronted the French expedition at the point of intersection between the French and British routes, leading to the Fashoda Incident and eventual French retreat. Another proposed project, the Trans-Saharan Railway, which planned to connect colonial Algeria to sub-Saharan Africa by rail, saw little progress before abandonment.

The Portuguese considered an Angola to Mozambique railway to link west with east and produced the "Pink Map" representing their claims to sovereignty in Africa (to link Angola and Mozambique). These plans ended after the 1890 British Ultimatum.

Egypt has a rail system that, as early as 1854, connected Port Said, Alexandria and Cairo, and currently goes as far south as Aswan. In Egypt the railway is 1,435 mm (4 ft 8 1/2 in) standard gauge. After a ferry link on the Nile, the railway continues into Sudan from Wadi Halfa to Khartoumon a 1,067 mm (3 ft 6 in) Cape gauge (see Northern Africa Railroad Development). This part of the system was started by Lord Kitchener in 1897 to provide supplies during his war against the Mahdist State. Further railway links go south, the most southern point being Wau.

Opposition to British rule in South Africa was settled after the First and Second Boer Wars (the wars ended in 1902, but the new Union of South Africa did not incorporate its two states until 1910).

== Missed completion ==
British interests had to overcome obstacles of geography and climate, and the competing imperial schemes of the French, Portuguese and Germans. In 1891, Germany secured the strategically critical territory of German East Africa, which, along with the mountainous rainforest of the Belgian Congo, precluded the building of a Cape to Cairo railway.

In 1916, during World War I, British, African, and Indian soldiers won the Tanganyika Territory (now Tanzania) from the German Empire. The British continued to rule the territory after the war, which was a League of Nations mandate from 1922. The continuous line of colonies necessary was gained.

The southern section was completed during British rule before the First World War and has an interconnecting system of national railways using the Cape gauge of 1,067 mm (3 ft 6 in). Construction started from Cape Town and went parallel to the Great North Road to Kimberley through Botswana to Bulawayo. From this junction the link proceeded further north. The Victoria Falls Bridge was completed in 1905.

The British Empire possessed the political power to complete the Cape to Cairo Railway, but economics, including the Great Depression of the 1930s, prevented its completion before World War II. After World War II, the decolonisation of Africa and the establishment of independent countries removed the colonial rationale for the project and increased the difficulties, effectively ending it.

== Operating segments ==
South Sudan became independent in 2011. The border between Sudan and South Sudan is closed, and the railways in South Sudan are no longer operational.

Most of Sudan's railway network is in disrepair due to political turmoil and US sanctions. A Khartoum–Atbara railway service began running in 2014 after China provided equipment and supplies. Other railway services have been put into place in Khartoum and surrounding areas.

Currently operational length is 5,625 kilometres (3,495 mi) out of total 10,489 kilometres (6,518 mi). The operational status of sections of the railway is as follows:

- South-western section: starting from Cape Town, passing through Kimberley and Mahikeng in South Africa, Gaborone and Francistown in Botswana, to Bulawayo in Zimbabwe.
- South-eastern section: from Port Elizabeth, passing through Bloemfontein, Johannesburg, Pretoria and Musina in South Africa, to Bulawayo.
- South-central section: Bulawayo to Victoria Falls in Zimbabwe, to Livingstone, Lusaka and Ndola in Zambia, to Sakania, Lubumbashi, Tenke, Bukama, Kamina, Kabalo and Kindu in the DRC.
  - Incomplete stretch from Kindu to Uvira in Congo-Kinshasa, Bujumbura and Kayanza in Burundi, Butare and Kigali in Rwanda, to Kampala in Uganda.
- Central stretch: connects Kampala to Njeru, Busembatia, Tororo and Gulu in Uganda.
  - Incomplete stretch from Gulu in Uganda to Juba and Wau in South Sudan.
  - Dead end at Wau in South Sudan to Babanusa in Sudan, due to local wars (see: Babanusa-Wau Railway).
- North-upper Nile stretch: connects Babanusa to Sennar, Khartoum and Wadi Halfa in Sudan.
  - Incomplete stretch of Wadi Halfa in Sudan to Aswan in Egypt.
- North-lower Nile stretch: connects Aswan to Luxor, Asyut, Cairo and Benha in Egypt.
- North-western section: connects Benha to Alexandria in Egypt.
- North-central stretch: connects Benha to Damietta in Egypt.
- North-eastern section: connects Benha to Port Said in Egypt.

== Connection with other railway systems ==
=== Uganda railway ===
East Africa has a network of narrow gauge 1,000 mm (3 ft 3 3/8 in) railways that historically grew from ports on the Indian Ocean and went westward, built in parallel under British and German colonial rule. The furthest string north was the Uganda Railway. Eventually these networks were linked, so that today there is a continuous rail connection between Kampala, Uganda, on Lake Victoria to the coastal cities of Mombasa in Kenya and Dar es Salaam in Tanzania. Up to the break-up of the East African Community in 1977, these companies operated as East African Railways, but operate today as different national companies.

=== TAZARA link ===
From Dar es Salaam, a 1,860 km rail link to Kapiri Mposhi in Zambia was built from 1970 to 1975 as a turnkey project financed and supported by China. This Tanzania-Zambia-Railway (TAZARA) was built to connect landlocked Zambia and its mineral wealth to a port on the Indian Ocean, independent from port connections in South Africa. At that time, Mozambique was Portuguese-controlled territory. Not intended in the grand picture of the Cape to Cairo Railway, the TAZARA fills a critical link. This connection uses the 1,067 mm (3 ft 6 in) gauge of the southern part of Africa.

=== Benguela-Katanga link ===
In the city of Tenke, in the Democratic Republic of Congo, there is an interconnection of the Cape-Cairo Railway with the Katanga-Benguela railway linking it to the port of Lobito in Angola, on the Atlantic coast.

=== Kidatu connection ===
In 1998, a transshipment hub was built at Kidatu in southern Tanzania to connect the metre gauge Central Line (Tanzania) with the Cape gauge TAZARA line. This also shortened the distance.

=== Railway systems in Mozambique, Zimbabwe and South Africa ===
The railway is connected to the Mozambican, Zimbabwean and South African systems through the Beira-Bulawayo railway, the Limpopo railway and the Pretoria-Maputo railway, reaching the ports of Maputo and Beira.

== Road ==
The Court Treatt expedition, an attempt to travel from Cape to Cairo by road, was made in 1924 using two cars.

The Cairo–Cape Town Highway was planned to connect roughly the same countries. Large sections of it are paved and passable.

== In fiction ==
John Crowley's science fiction novella Great Work of Time features an alternative history in which the British Empire survived to the end of the 20th century and beyond, and the Cape to Cairo Railway was completed. In an early chapter the protagonist travels in comfort the whole route from South Africa to Egypt.

== See also ==
- Cape to Cairo
  - Cape to Cairo Red Line
- Sudan Military Railroad
- Scramble for Africa
- East African Railway Master Plan
- Lamu Port and Lamu-Southern Sudan-Ethiopia Transport Corridor – 2012

== Sources ==
- Freeman, Lewis R. (January 1915). "Rhodes's "All Red" Route: The Effect Of The War On The Cape-To-Cairo And The Control Of A Continent". The World's Work: A History of Our Time. XXIX: 327–355.
- Sölch, Werner (1985). Kap-Kairo: Eisenbahnen zwischen Ägypten und Südafrika. Düsseldorf: Alba Verlag. ISBN 3-87094-101-4. (in German)
- Tabor, George, The Cape to Cairo Railway & River Routes (2003), London: Genta. ISBN 0-9544847-0-3.
