= Kisenge Airport =

- IATA: none; ICAO: FZQP

Summary
- Airport type: Public
- Serves: Kisenge
- Elevation AMSL: 3,412 ft / 1,040 m
- Coordinates: 10°40′01″S 23°10′30″E

Map
- Location of the airport in Democratic Republic of the Congo

Runways
Direction	Length		Surface
Direction	m	ft	Surface
11/29	1,500	4,921	Gravel
- Sources: Google Maps GCM

Kisenge Airport (ICAO: FZQP) is an airport serving the town of Kisenge in Lualaba Province, Democratic Republic of the Congo. The runway is just north of the town.

Kisenge is the site of an old manganese mine, and was a refugee center during the Second Congo War.

== See also ==
- Transport in the Democratic Republic of the Congo
- List of airports in the Democratic Republic of the Congo
