= Comazar =

African railway operator

- Company type: Joint Stock
- Industry: Railways
- Founded: 1995
- Headquarters: Johannesburg
- Key people: Eric Peiffer; Patrick Claes
- Products: Railway operation
- Revenue: ~
- Number of employees: ~
- Website: www.comazar.com

Comazar is a company that operates railways in Africa. Its stock is majority owned by the French investment group Bolloré. Comazar was founded by Eric Peiffer and Patrick Claes in conjunction with Transnet (Spoornet) and Transurb Consult (a Belgian Railways subsidiary) in 1995.

The headquarters are in Johannesburg.

== Related organizations ==
Comazar owns stock in and operates the following privately held railways:

- Camrail - Cameroon - 20 year concession from 1999.
- Sitarail Railways - Côte d'Ivoire and Burkina Faso
- Ethiopian Railways - 25 year concession from 2006.

Comazar is also a ten percent partner in Rift Valley Railways.

== Previous concessions ==
In addition, the company has operated railways in these countries in the past:

- Madarail - Madagascar - The concession passed through a number of hands before, in April 2022, becoming 100% owned by the government of Madagascar.
- Sizarail - Democratic Republic of the Congo - The company obtained a 5-year mandate, starting in 1996, to run the country's rail. Comazar started a commuter rail service in Lubumbashi that carried 2 mm passengers per year. Ridership had more than doubled in 2 years of operation, but the government of the Democratic Republic of the Congo cancelled the company's management mandate and confiscated all assets in 1997.
- Trans Africa Railway Corporation Tanzania Ltd (TARC) - Tanzania - the company withdrew from its participation in this project in 2002, after 4 years of work. See Tanzania Railways Corporation, currently operated by Rites Consortium of India.
