= Chiluage =

Coordinates: 9°31′S 21°48′E

- commune
- Location in Angola
- Country: Angola
- Province: Lunda Sul
- Time zone: UTC+1 (WAT)

Chiluage is a town and commune of Angola, located in the province of Lunda Sul, adjacent to the border with the Democratic Republic of the Congo.

== See also ==
- Communes of Angola
