= Luau, Moxico Leste =

Town and municipality in Angola

Luau
- Town
- Location within Angola
- Coordinates: 10°42′16″S 22°13′42″E
- Country: Angola
- Province: Moxico Leste
- Founder: Sir Robert Williams

Luau is a town and municipality in Angola in the province of Moxico Leste on the border with the Democratic Republic of Congo.

== History ==
Until independence, the town was called Teixeira de Sousa, having been named after the Portuguese Prime Minister António Teixeira de Sousa. The town once had a population of nearly 90,000 due to its creation as a stopping point on the Benguela railway, which continued east to cross the nearby Luao River and enter Dilolo, where it connected to the Katanga rail network. It was developed as a railroad town by Sir Robert Williams, a friend of Cecil Rhodes.

The town has downsized considerably since independence.

== Transport ==
The Benguela railway connects Luau with the port of Lobito, Angola to the rich minerals of the Katanga province of the then Belgian Congo. The railway and town were very successful until the Angolan Civil War, when the infrastructure of Angola, as well as most industry, ceased to be productive. As a result of the war, there are also considerable amounts of mine-fields around the town, making transportation and development considerably difficult. After the war, the railway was slowly rebuilt, and the first train reached Luau in August 2013.

== See also ==
- Benguela railway
- Sir Robert Williams
- Vila Robert Williams
