= Madarail =

Madagascar Railways SA
- Type: Joint stock
- Industry: Rail transport
- Founded: 1999
- Headquarters: Antananarivo
- Key people: Patrick Claes, Managing Director; Patrick Stevenaert, General Manager; Théodore Rasolonjatovo, Operations Manager; Eric Pfeiffer, Chairman of the Board
- Products: Train transport service Infrastructure construction
- Number of employees: ~ 850
- Website: http://www.madarail.mg

Madarail
Overview
- Headquarters: Antananarivo
- Locale: Madagascar
- Dates of operation: 2003–present

Technical
- Track gauge: 1,000 mm (3 ft 3 3/8 in)

The government of Madagascar has granted Madarail a 25-year concession to operate the northern of the two national rail lines. The company is investing in Madagascar's rail system. Operations began in 2003 with one locomotive; 7 more locomotives have been purchased from the Portuguese Comboios de Portugal, the CP Class 9020.

== Overview ==
The shares of this company are hold at 100% by the state of Madagascar after the private investor that hold 75% of the shares desisted in April 2022.

== Business development ==
It is planned to refurbish the line Antanananrivo-Antsirabe (159km) that had been closed in the mid of the 1990's after passage of the Cyclone Ana that damaged a bridge of the river Sasaony, at 19km from Antananarivo. Madarail previews to reopen the freight service between Toamasina and Antsirabe in December 2023.

The line between Antanananrivo and Antsirabe reopened on 2 December 2023.

== Gallery ==
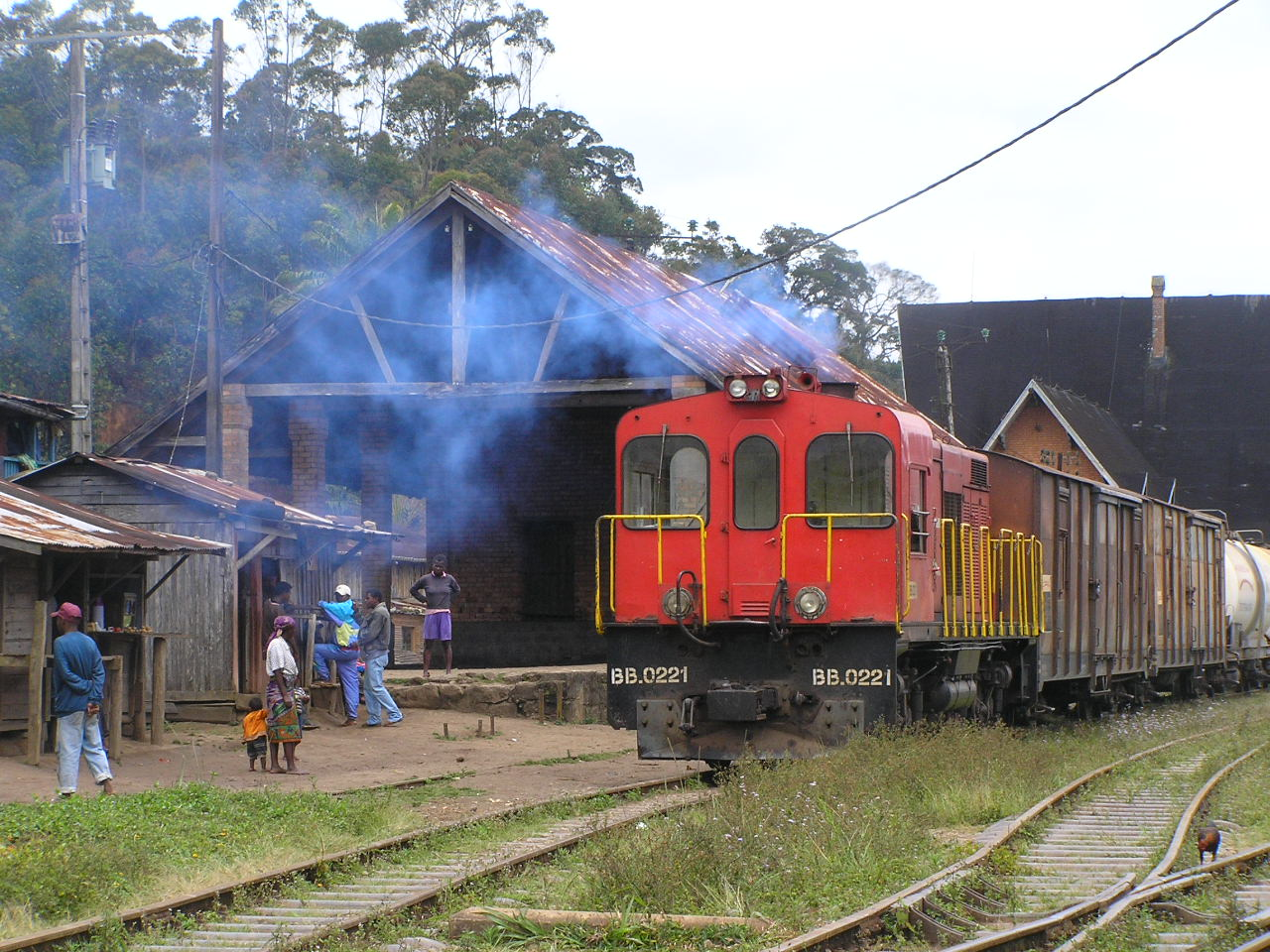
Train waiting at Andasibe station

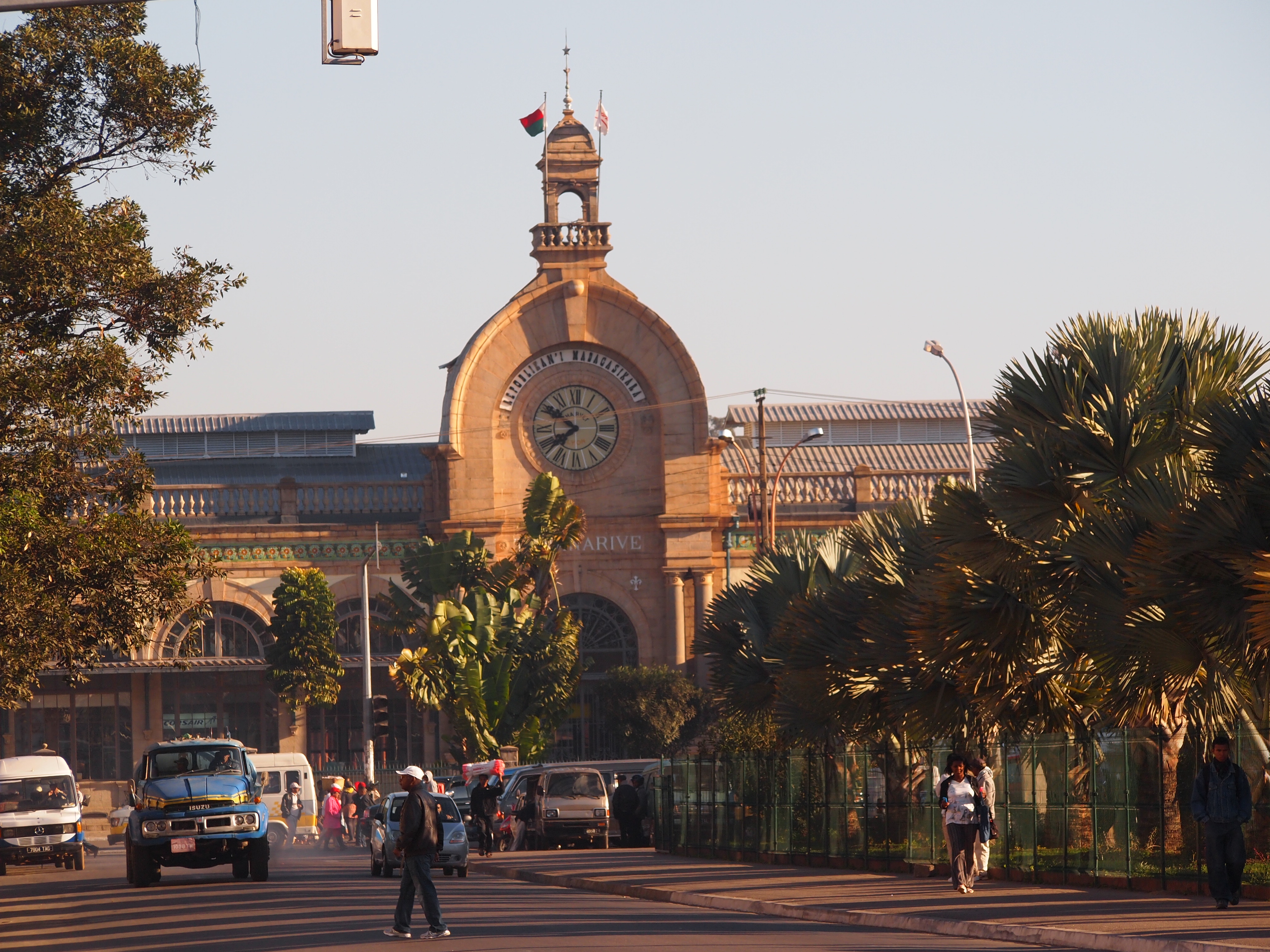
Soarano train station in Antananarivo

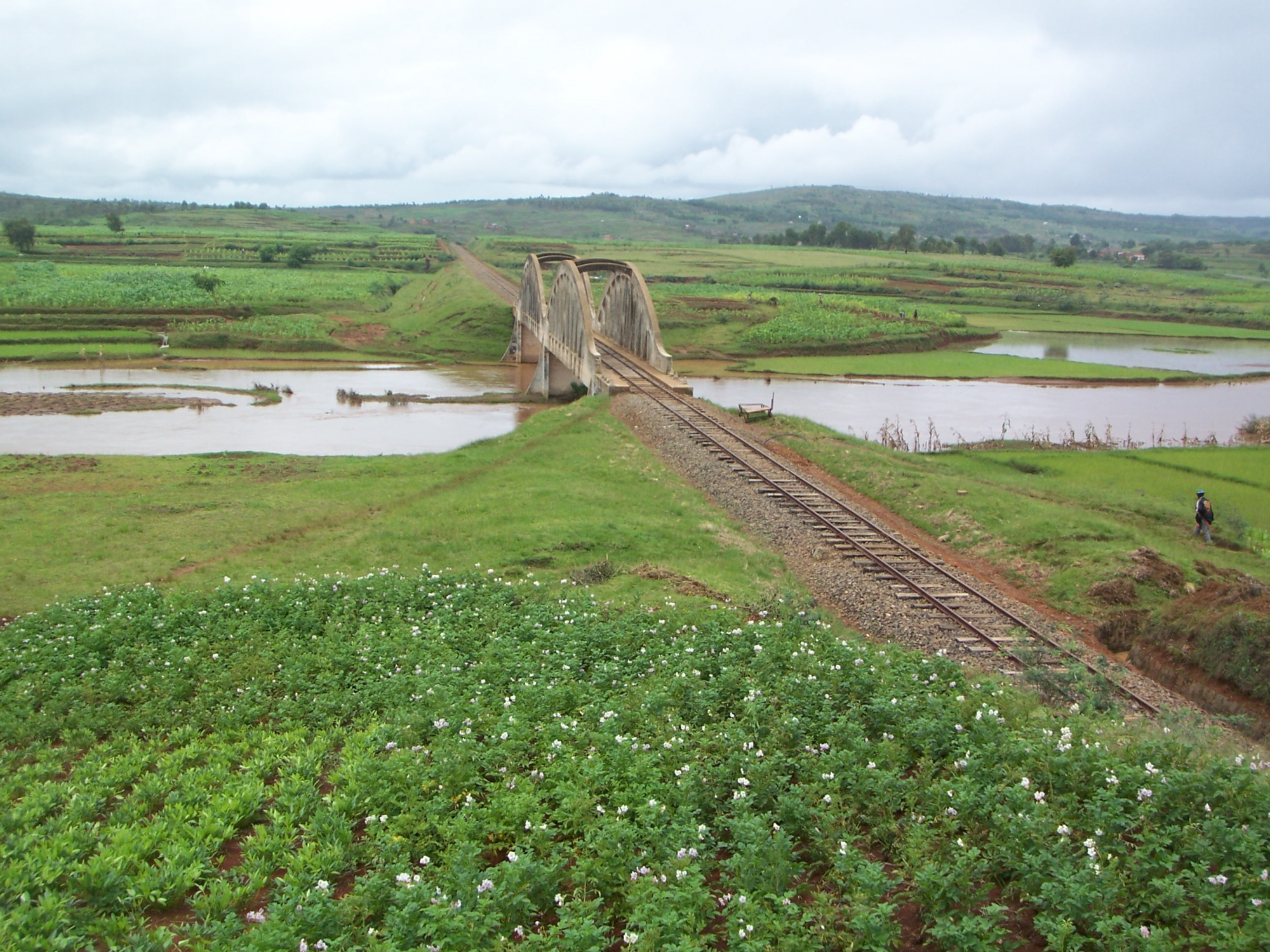
Railroad bridge in Madagascar

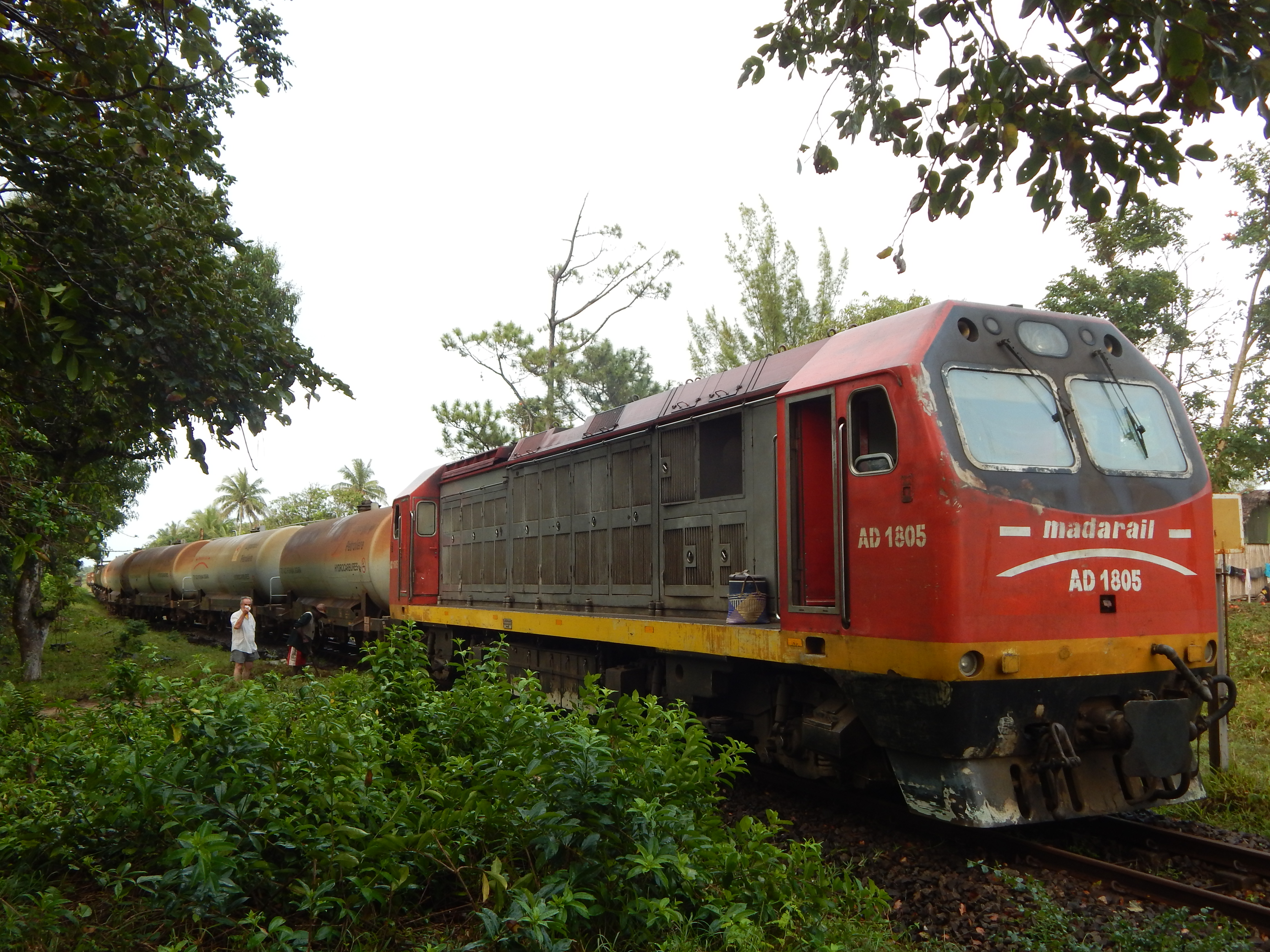
Madarail

== Timeline ==
=== 2007 ===
- Five new SDD9 locomotives delivered. Built by CSR Sifang.

=== 2010 ===
- Six reconditioned locomotives delivered for Dynatec Mining, managed and operated by Madarail on their behalf. Supplied by GE/Motive Power & Equipment Solutions, Inc.

=== 2022 ===
- Four new G20-3 locomotives delivered. Built by Ferrovias Del Bajio S.A (FVB) (Mexico).
- Two BB700 locomotives delivered.

== See also ==
- History of rail transport in Madagascar
- Rail transport in Madagascar
- Transport in Madagascar
- Railway stations in Madagascar
