= Divuma =

Town in the Democratic Republic of the Congo

Coordinates: 10°36′0″S 22°57′0″E

Divuma (or Diongo) is a town in the Lualaba province of the Democratic Republic of the Congo, near the border with Zambia.

== Transport ==
=== Road ===
The city is crossed by Transafican Highway 9 (TAH 9), which connects it to the cities of Dilolo and Kasaji.

=== Rail ===
The city has a train station, which receives trains from the Benguela railway. It is the junction for a short branchline to the south, which connects with the village of Kisenge.

== See also ==
- Railway stations in DRCongo
