= Kisenge =

Village in Lualaba province, Congo

Kisenge is a village in the province of Lualaba, located in the southern Democratic Republic of Congo, close to the border with Angola.

== Climate ==
The climate is tropical and the village is surrounded by dense forests. Between May and September it rains a lot in the village.

== Population ==
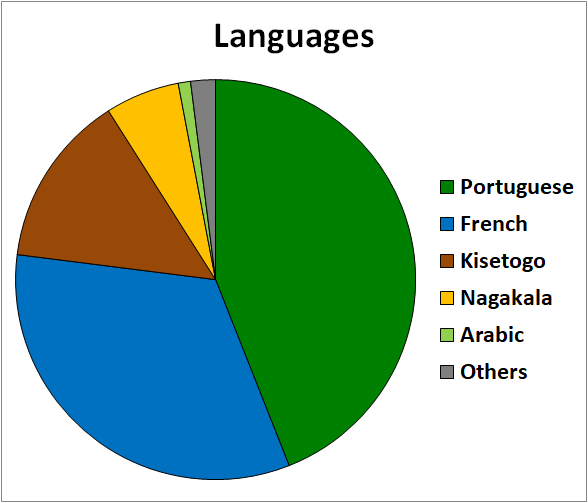
Languages in Kisenge (2019)

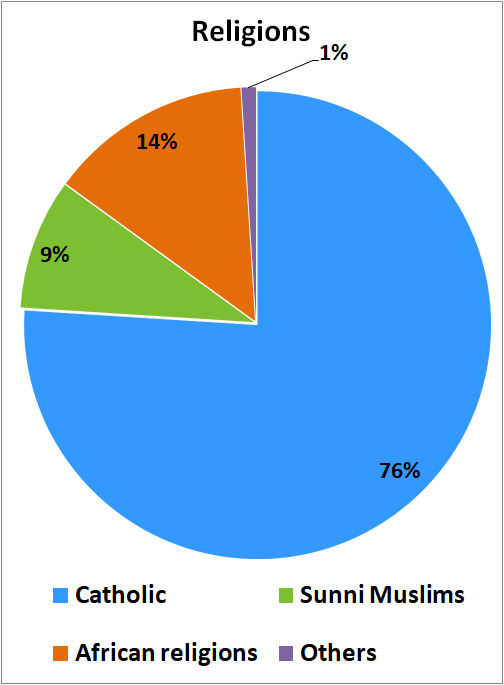
Religions in Kisenge (2018)

There are no accurate data on the village's population. However, it is estimated that the village has 3,500 people.

The vast majority of the village's population is Catholic Christian, however there are small minorities of Sunni Muslims and traditional African religions.

Until 1940 the overwhelming majority of the population spoke Kisetogo or Nagakala, languages based on Bantu. However, after 1940 the French language also began to be present in the village. In 1975, with Portugal leaving its African colonies and with the independence of Angola, dozens of Angolans migrated to Kisenge. Thus, in the last decades the Portuguese language has been assimilated by the population and almost half of the population already speaks Portuguese fluently and as a first language. Another factor for the growing number of Portuguese speakers in the village is the large investment in the village by Brazil and Angola and, less by Portugal.

=== Economy ===
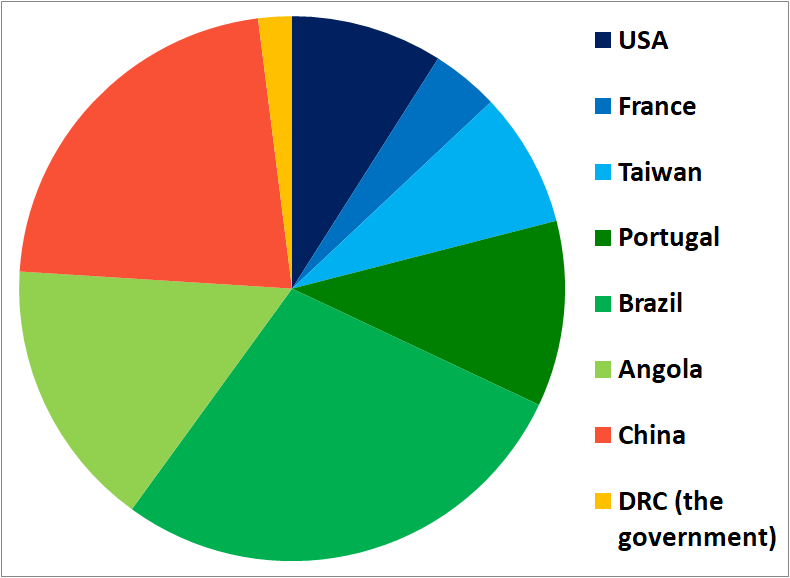
Economic investments in Kisenge - 2019

Kisenge has one of the main mines in the province of Lualaba, with its production being drained through the Kisenge Branch of the Benguela Railway. The project started in 2013, when a Brazilian company built a complex for the exploration of minerals and metals, employing almost 40% of the entire population.

The village's economy is sustained mainly by clearing the forest and selling wood. In 2007, a company with Angolan and Kenyan capital purchased large portions of land for deforestation, employing a large part of the population.

Investments by Portugal and France led to the construction of the first health center and a bilingual school (Portuguese and French). In 2011, Chinese investments led to the construction of a large paint factory, although this factory employed about 25% of the population, it polluted the village's lake. In addition, the company started building a school to learn Chinese and a small apartment complex to house Chinese workers. In 2012, the population revolted due to the pollution of the lake and distrust of Chinese immigrants and the attempt to spread Chinese culture, and destroyed the buildings in construction. Currently, the construction of these buildings has been abandoned.

The United States and Taiwan have invested in improving the village's infrastructure and telecommunications.

== Infrastructure ==
The village has one of the branches of the Benguela Railway, which serves mainly for the transportation of minerals. The branch links the village of Kisenge with the city of Divuma.

The locality has the Kisenge Airport.
