= Kabalo Airport =

Airport in Tanganyika Province, DR Congo

- IATA: KBO; ICAO: FZRM

Summary
- Serves: Kabalo
- Elevation AMSL: 1,840 ft / 561 m
- Coordinates: 6°05′00″S 26°55′00″E

Map
- Location of airport in Democratic Republic of the Congo

Runways
Direction	Length		Surface
Direction	m	ft	Surface
17/35	1,400	4,593	Grass
- Source: GCM Google Maps

Kabalo Airport (IATA: KBO, ICAO: FZRM) is an airport serving the town of Kabalo, in the Tanganyika Province of Democratic Republic of the Congo.

The runway is 2.4 kilometres (1.5 mi) south of the town, paralleling the Lualaba River.

== See also ==
- Transport in the Democratic Republic of the Congo
- List of airports in the Democratic Republic of the Congo
