= Angola–Democratic Republic of the Congo border =

International border

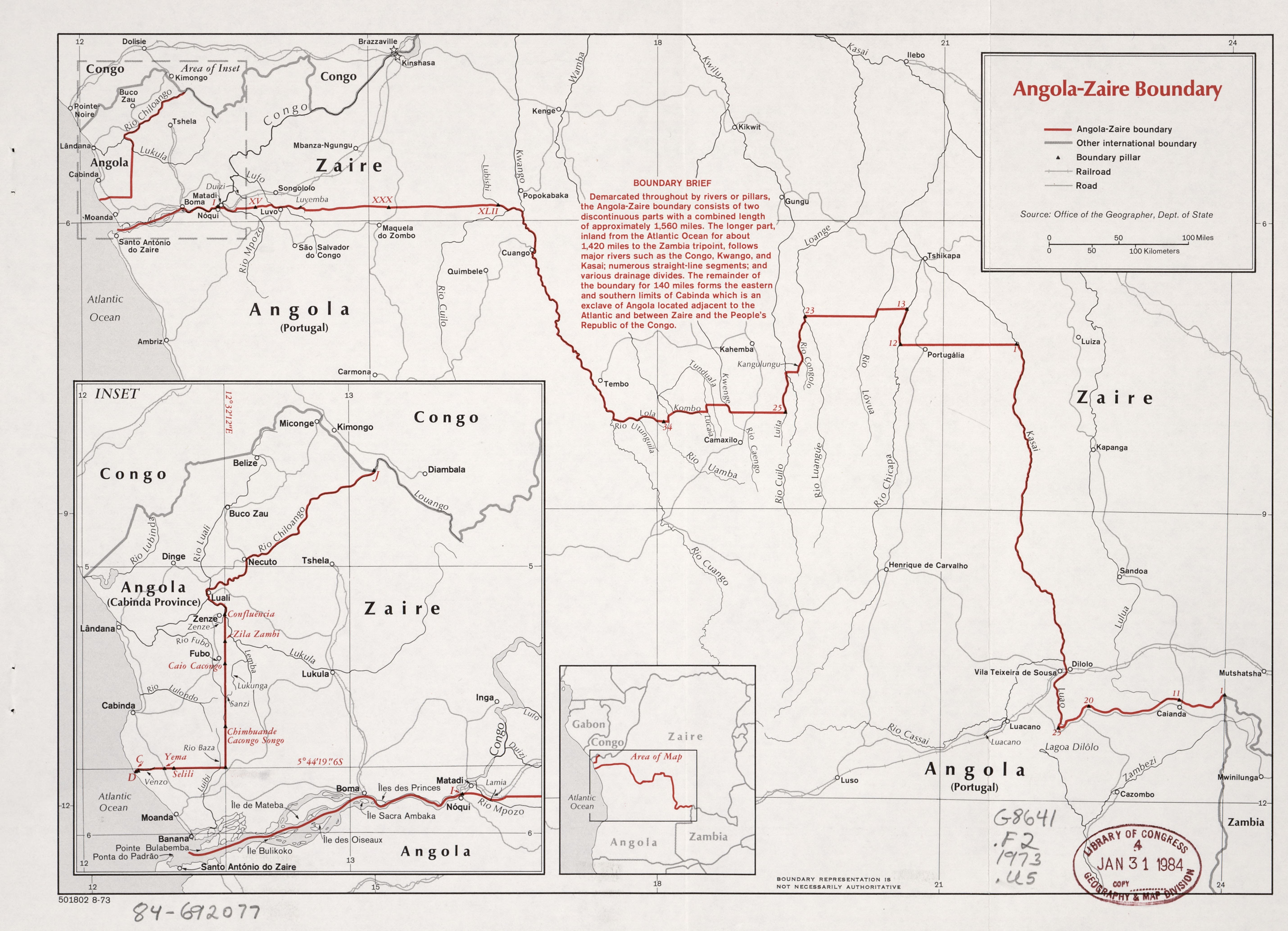
Map of the Angola-DRC border

The Angola–Democratic Republic of the Congo border is 2,646 km (1,644 mi) in length and consists of two non-contiguous sections: a 225 km (140 mi) section along the border with Angola's province of Cabinda, running from the Atlantic Ocean to the tripoint with the Republic of Congo, and a much longer 2,421 km (1,504 mi) section running from the Atlantic to the tripoint with Zambia.

== Description ==
=== Northern (Cabinda) section ===
The border starts in the west on the Atlantic coast, proceeding to the north-east by an irregular and then a straight line, before turning to the north where it then proceeds in a straight line up to Luali river. The border then follows this river north to the confluence with the Chiloango, then following the latter as it flows to the north-east up the tripoint with the Republic of Congo.

=== Southern section ===
The border starts in the west on the Atlantic Coast at the estuary of the Congo River, following this river eastwards for a period before leaving it just north of the Angolan town of Noqui. It then proceeds in a roughly straight line eastwards, occasionally utilising rivers such as the Mpozo, Lufo and Luvemba, before reaching the Lubishi river, following this briefly to its confluence with the Kwango. It then follows the Kwango as it flows to the south, before turning east at the confluence with the Utunguila. The border then proceed eastwards, utilising a number of rivers (notably the Lola, Wamba, Kombo, Lucaia, Kwenge, Luita, Congolo, Lovua and the Chicapa) and straight overland lines (including the 7th parallel south and 8th parallel south), before reaching the Kasai River. The border then follows this river, and then the Luao, as they flow from the south, before turning east and proceeding overland via various irregular lines to the Zambian tripoint.

== History ==
Portugal had begun exploring the coast of modern Angola in the 1480s, and over the following century established a number of coastal settlements, gradually expanding into the interior at the expense of the native kingdoms of Kongo, Matamba, Ndongo and others. Portugal had also established a tentative presence in what is now Cabinda in 1783, a claim recognised in an Anglo-Portuguese treaty of 22 January 1815. In the 1880s numerous European powers sought to create colonies in the continent a process known as the Scramble for Africa; this culminated in the Berlin Conference of 1884, in which the European nations concerned agreed upon their respective territorial claims and the rules of engagements going forward. At this time the area of the modern DRC was controlled by the Congo Free State, held under the personal rule of Belgian King Leopold II, who had sponsored various explorations in the region under the guise of humanitarianism. As a result of the Conference Portugal's claim to Cabinda was recognised, at the expense of Portugal's giving up a short section of coast to the Congo Free State, thereby cutting off Cabinda from mainland Angola. A border between Congo and Cabinda and Congo and Angola as far west as the Kwanga was also agreed upon.

A large number of boundary agreements were signed in the following decades: on 25 May 1891 a treaty was signed which detailed the Cabinda and Atlantic-Kwango sections of the border in further detail. A treaty signed shortly thereafter delimited in a rough form the rest of the border, stating that a more precise line was to be drawn later by a boundary commission. The commission surveyed the middle Kwango-Kasai section in 1893, which was approved by the two governments the following year. The Noqui-Kwango section of the border was demarcated in 1901–02, being finally approved 5 July 1915. The Cabinda-Congo boundary was surveyed in more detail in 1900, being finalised at its current position on 5 July 1913. A final demarcation was later approved on 14 March 1925. The Kasai-Zambia tripoint section was finalised, following a disagreement over which rivers to utilise, in April–July 1910, being demarcated on the ground in 1914–15. The middle Kwango-Kasai section was demarcated on the ground in 1923. Finally, further adjustments were made in the regions of Matadi and Dilolo in July 1927. Attempts to adjust the Congo river section in 1935 were made but never enacted.

Administration of the Congo Free State was taken over by the Belgian government in 1908 following controversies engendered by the atrocities committed by Leopold's forces there. The Belgian Congo gained independence (as the Republic of the Congo, later renamed Democratic Republic of the Congo) on 30 June 1960. Portugal however firmly resisted the wave of decolonisation in Africa, making Angola a legal part of Portugal in 1951. Angolan nationalists began fighting for independence in 1961, achieved in 1975 following a revolution in Portugal. Cabinda meanwhile sought to establish a separate state, kick-starting the Cabinda War. The southern border section has also been unstable for much of this period also, due to civil wars in Angola and Congo, resulting in numerous cross-border incursions and refugee flows.

== Settlements near the border ==
=== Angola ===
- Tando Zinze
- Chimbuande
- Soyo
- Sumba
- Sacandica
- Cuango
- Swa-Kibula
- Caingo
- Sangoia
- Chiluage
- Cubacatanda
- Tambue
- Luao
- Cafungo
- Caianda

=== Democratic Republic of the Congo ===
- Luali
- Banana
- Boma
- Matadi
- Kikuati
- Kasongo Lunda
- Sefu
- Nzadi-Muari
- Tembo
- Kitamga
- Makongo
- Bandangongo
- Mwenilunga
- Sandambi
- Cangombe
- Sambembe
- Safuji
- Dilolo
- Dumba
- Mukosai

== See also ==
- Angola–Brazil relations
- Angola–Democratic Republic of the Congo relations
