= Kamina =

- Provincial Capital and city
- Ville de Kamina
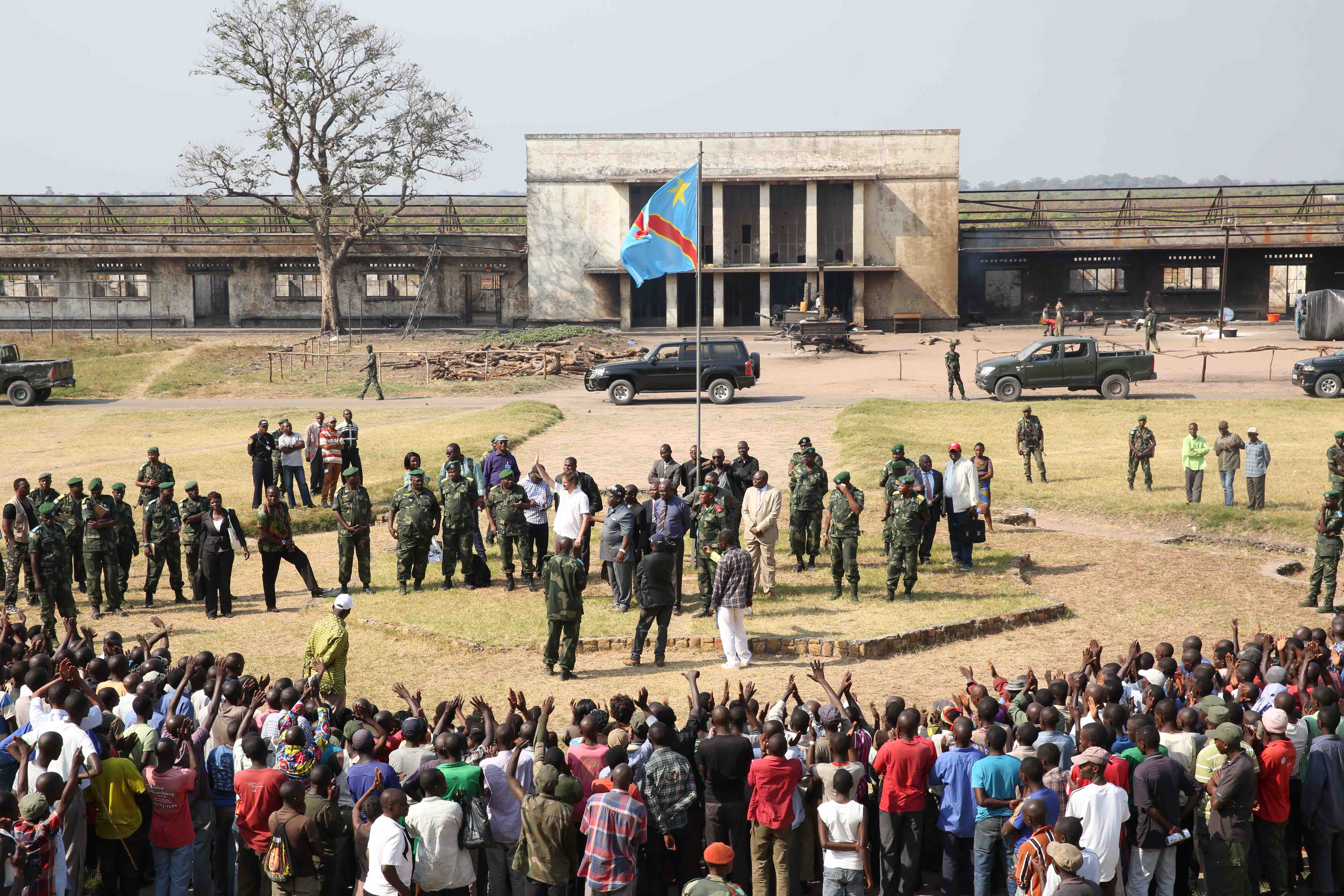
- Government troops in Kamina, 2015

- Location in Democratic Republic of the Congo
- Coordinates: 8°44′19″S 24°59′26″E
- Country: DR Congo
- Province: Haut-Lomami
- Communes: Dimayi, Kamina, Sobongo

Government
  - Mayor: Miky Umba
- Elevation: 1,100 m (3,600 ft)

Population (2012)
  - Total: 156,761
- Time zone: UTC+2 (Central Africa Time)
- National language: Swahili
- Climate: Aw

Kamina is the capital city of Haut-Lomami Province in the Democratic Republic of the Congo.

== Transport ==
Kamina is known as an important railway node; three lines of the DRC railways run from Kamina toward the north, west, and south-east. The main railway line, the operating sections of the Cape to Cairo Railway, links the city with Tenke and Lubumbashi to the south and Kabalo and Kindu to the northeast. It has two airports, one civil (Kamina Airport) and one military (Kamina Base Airport). It lies along National Road 1 (N1) and Regional Road 630 (R630).

== Military ==
The Belgian Armed Forces established a large military base in Kamina after the Second World War. The large base complex consisted of Base 1, an air base used for flying training, and Base 2, a paratroop training facility. From September 1953 to 1960, the Advanced Pilots' School of the Belgian Air Force operated some 60 North American Harvards from the base.

When the Congo gained independence in June 1960, Belgium initially retained control of Kamina, under agreement with the Congolese government, but in October 1960 control of the base was taken over by the United Nations. The base was never under Katangese control, although Katangese troops occupied the nearby town of Kaminaville.

In early 1964, the UN handed over Kamina to the Congolese Armed Forces. It is now a 'brassage' centre for the slowly forming Army of the Military of the Democratic Republic of the Congo. Brassage is the process whereby fighters of the former DRC warring factions are brought together into new combined units.

== Sports ==
In 2019, the Governor of Haut-Lomami inaugurated the "Stade Joseph Kabila Kabange", a modern sports arena. The stadium was started in 2008, with 2 Million US dollars of funding from Katanga Province. After work on the stadium halted for nearly a decade, the Governor announced that the stadium was completed as a gift from then-President Joseph Kabila to the population of Haut-Lomami.

== See also ==
- University of Kamina
- Railway stations in DRCongo
