= Manika, Kolwezi =

Commune of the city of Kolwezi in the Democratic Republic of the Congo

Manika
- Commune
- Location within Democratic Republic of the Congo
- Coordinates: 11.0006°S 26.7571°E
- Country: Democratic Republic of the Congo
- Province: Lualaba
- City: Kolwezi

Manika is a commune of the city of Kolwezi in the Lualaba Province of the Democratic Republic of the Congo.

Stade Dominique Diur, a football stadium, is located within Manika. It is the home ground for multiple teams in the Linafoot, the top division of men's football in the DRC. These include AS Simba and Blessing FC.

It is also home to the National Institute of Professional Preparation, a training center for trade workers, especially miners. Illegal artisanal mining has taken place in the commune, with multiple residential buildings in the Kasulo neighborhood collapsing after being destabilized by mines in 2014.
