= Sakania =

Town of the Democratic Republic of the Congo

- Location within Democratic Republic of the Congo
- Coordinates: 12.7496°S 28.5594°E
- Country: DR Congo
- Province: Haut-Katanga

Sakania is the seat of Sakania Territory in Haut-Katanga Province in the far south of the Democratic Republic of Congo. It is in the Congo Pedicle, near the border with Zambia. The town sits at the high altitude of 1,278 metres (4,193 ft) above sea level, and accordingly has a relatively cool climate. Between 1935 and 1939 it recorded one of the lowest temperatures in the history of the country, −1.5 °C (29.3 °F).

The town is close to Frontier copper mine, one of the largest in the country.

On the other side of the DRC-Zambian border is the city of Ndola in Copperbelt Province.

== Transport ==
The city is served by the operating sections of the Cape to Cairo Railway. It has a station on the railway between Ndola in the south and Lubumbashi in the north-west.

== See also ==
- Transport in DRC
