= Dilolo =

City in Lualaba province of Congo

Coordinates: 10°28′00″S 22°28′00″E

Dilolo is a town in Dilolo Territory, Lualaba province, Democratic Republic of the Congo. It lies within five miles of the eastern bank of the Luao River, the DRC-Angolan border, and the Angolan town of Luau, at an altitude of 3510 ft (1069 m).

== Transport ==
=== Road ===
The city is crossed by Trans-African Highway 9 (TAH 9), which connects it to the cities of Luau and Divuma.

=== Rail ===
The city has a train station, which receives trains from the Benguela railway.

=== Airport ===
The town is served by Dilolo Airport, and by Luau International Airport (Luau, Angola)
