= Benguela railway =

Railway line in Angola

Benguela Railway
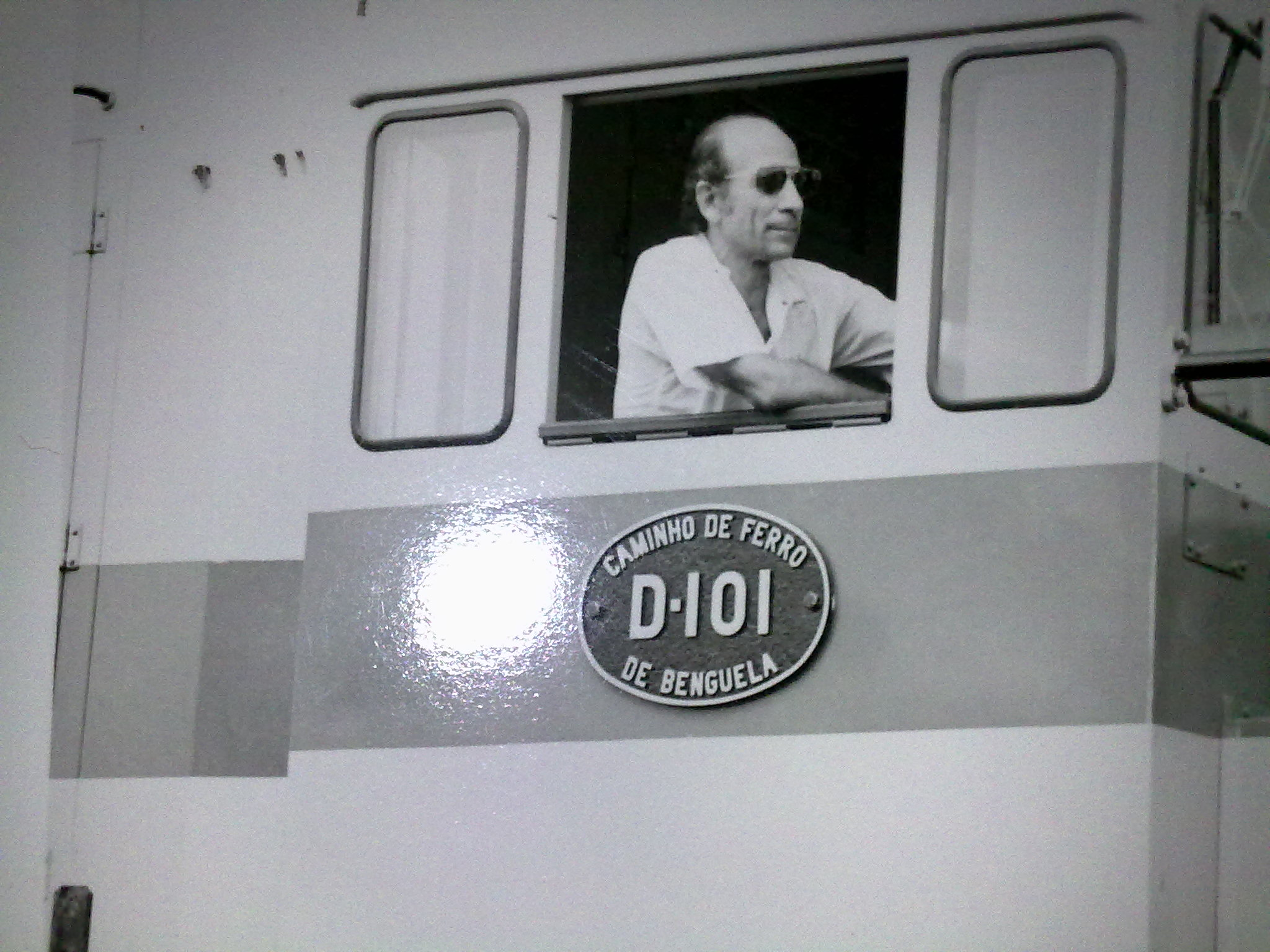
- CFB Diesel locomotive, in 1973

Overview
- Status: Operational
- Locale: Angola and D.R. Congo
- Termini: Lobito; Tenke

Service
- Type: Heavy rail

History
- Opened: 1905

Technical
- Line length: 1,866 km (1,159 mi)
- Track gauge: 1,067 mm (3 ft 6 in)
- Operating speed: 90 km/h (56 mph)
- Highest elevation: 6,082 ft (1,854 m)
Angola-Congo-Zambia railway network
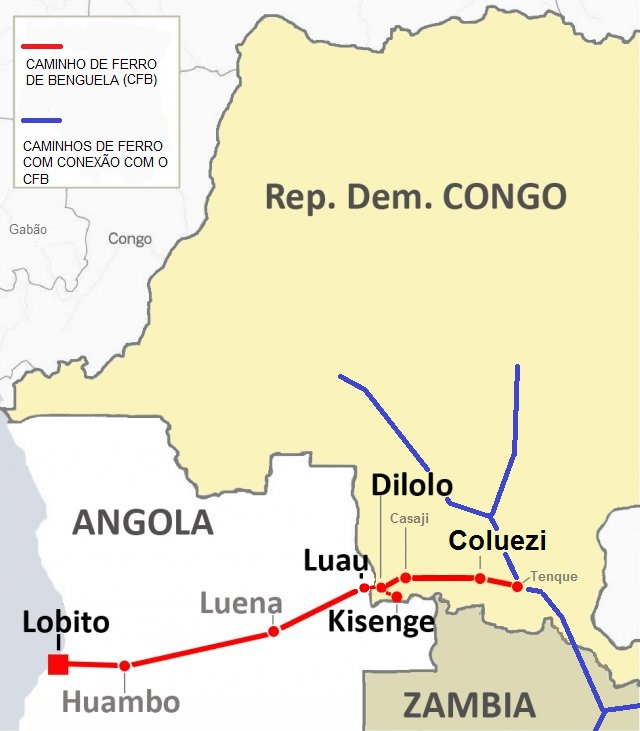

The Benguela Railway (Portuguese: Caminho de Ferro de Benguela (CFB)) is a Cape gauge railway line that runs through Angola from west to east, being the largest and most important railway line in the country. It also connects to Tenke in the Democratic Republic of the Congo (DRC), and to the Cape to Cairo Railway (connecting the city of Kindu (DRC) to the city of Gqeberha (formerly Port Elizabeth) in South Africa).

The line terminates at the port of Lobito on the Atlantic coast, from where Angola exports a wide variety of products, including minerals (from the Copperbelt region), food, industrial components and livestock.

The section from Lobito to Luau is run by the Empresa do Caminho de Ferro de Benguela-E.P. It crosses the Luao River, which lies on the border, to Dilolo (DRC). From there to Tenke, the railway is operated by the Société nationale des Chemins de fer du Congo.

== Specifications ==
The railway is Cape gauge, 1,067 mm (3 ft 6 in), which is used by most mainline railways in southern Africa. The maximum design speed is 90 km per hour. The design capacity is 20 million tons of cargo and 4 million passengers per year. There are 67 stations and 42 bridges along the route of the railway.

The highest point on the railway is 1,854 metres (6,083 ft).

== Equipment ==
=== Locomotives ===
Type	Manufacturer	Notes	Source
CKD8F	CNR Dalian, Dalian, China	None serviceable	15 ordered in 2012
C30ACi	GE Transportation, Erie, Pennsylvania, U.S.	35 in freight service, 10 in passenger service	100 ordered for 2016–2019 delivery; 45 to CFB

== History ==
The railway line roughly follows old trade routes between the ancient trading centre of Benguela and its hinterland of the Bié plateau. In 1899, the Portuguese government initiated the construction of the railway to give access to the central Angolan plateau and the mineral wealth of the then Congo Free State. A concession, running for 99 years, was granted to Sir Robert Williams on 28 November 1902. His Benguela Railway Company took over the construction which commenced on 1 March 1903. Messrs Pauling & Co. and Messrs Griffiths & Co were contracted to build sections of the railway. By 1914, when World War I started, 500 kilometres (310 mi) had been completed. Construction was halted until 1920 after which the railway's connection to Luau at the border to the Belgian Congo was completed in 1929. The primary purpose was to facilitate export trade, while "the domestic Angolan traffic would be of secondary importance."

Passenger trains also ran between Lubumbashi and Lobito, connecting with passenger ship services to Europe. This provided a shorter route for Europeans working in the Katangan and Zambian Copperbelt, and the name "Benguela Railway", or also "Katanga-Benguela railway", was sometimes used loosely to refer to the entire Lubumbashi–Lobito route, rather than the Tenke–Lobito section to which it strictly applies.

In its heyday, the Benguela Railway was the shortest way to transport mineral riches from the Congo to Europe. The line proved very successful and profitable, especially in the early 1970s after Zambia closed its border with the then Rhodesia. The railway reached an operational peak in 1973 when it transported 3.3 million tons of cargo, generated freight revenues of $30 million, and had 14,000 employees. Until the early 1970s, the railway was operated entirely by steam locomotives, oil-fired from the coast to Cubal, and then wood-fired from Cubal to the interior. Wood was supplied by eucalyptus trees grown on company-owned tree plantations. Steam locomotives outnumbered diesels as late as 1987.

Soon after Angola gained its independence from Portugal in 1975, the Angolan Civil War broke out. The railway was heavily damaged during the war and progressively fell into disuse. The workshops in Huambo were destroyed. Ballast cars had to be coupled to the front of locomotives to detonate mines. By 1992, only 340 km (210 mi) of the railway remained in operation. When the 99-year concession expired in 2001, only 34 km (21 mi) remained in service, along the coast from Benguela to Lobito.

=== Rehabilitation and extension ===
The railway was 90% owned by Tanganyika Concessions (Tanks), a London-based holding company. Société Générale de Belgique purchased a minority share in Tanks in 1923 and acquired a controlling interest in 1981. The Belgian company remained the controlling owner of the railway when the concession expired in 2001, at which point ownership of the railway passed to the Angolan government.

After the Angolan Civil War ended in 2002, the railway was reconstructed between 2006 and 2014 by the China Railway Construction Corporation at a cost of $1.83 billion. 100,000 Angolans were employed on the railway reconstruction. Trains reached Huambo in 2011, Kuito in 2012, and Luau near the Congolese border in 2013. The rebuilt railway was formally inaugurated in February 2015.

According to Jornal de Angola in May 2012, Empresa do Caminho de Ferro de Benguela-E.P. employed 1,321 workers, and transported 129,430 passengers and 5,640 tons of goods in 2011. Two trains per day run between Lobito and Benguela, one per week to Huambo, and three per week between Lobito and Cubal.

On 5 March 2018, ore transport was restarted from the Tenke Fungurume Mine, in the DRC, from where copper and cobalt are extracted, and the cargo transported to the port of Lobito. From that date the railway went into full operation, connecting the city of Tenke to the city of Lobito.

In April 2023 the Angolan government confirmed funding to build a new 260km railway from Luena on the Benguela Railway to Saurimo, the capital of Lunda Sul province. The project includes eleven bridges and eight railway stations and construction began in January 2026, expected to take five years.

=== Lobito Atlantic Railway ===
On 4 July 2023, the Lobito Atlantic Railway company secured a 30-year concession for railway services. This joint venture involved Trafigura, a Singapore-based company, Mota-Engil, headquartered in Portugal, and Vecturis SA, a Belgium-based rail operator. The concession agreement encompassed the entire 1,300km railway line in Angola, extending to the 400km line into the Democratic Republic of the Congo (DRC) (up to Kolwezi), and also includes any potential service extensions in Zambia. To support their operations, the company committed to investing US$455,000,000 in Angola and up to US$100,000,000 in the DRC. The awarding of the concessions took place in the presence of Presidents João Lourenço of Angola, Félix Tshisekedi of the DRC, and Hakainde Hichilema of Zambia.

Expected to operate at least 1555 wagons and 30 locomotives in Angola, an initial 275 wagons were ordered by contract from South Africa in June 2024. Operations launched at the LAR mineral terminal at the Port of Lobito the following month, with the docking of MV Lindsaylou, a bulk cargo vessel, on 12 July 2024, with cargo later transferred to train cars to journey to the DRC.

== Accidents ==
In the Tolunda rail accident on 22 September 1994, damaged brakes caused a train to plunge into a canyon, killing 300.

== See also ==
- Lobito Corridor
- Congo Railway Company
- Luanda Railway
- Moçâmedes Railway
- Rail transport in Angola
- History of rail transport#Africa
- History of rail transport in Angola
