= Kabalo =

Town in Tanganyika Province, DRC

Coordinates: 06°03′00″S 26°55′00″E

Kabalo is a town in the Democratic Republic of the Congo. It is in Tanganyika province on the Lualaba River and is the administrative center of Kabalo territory.

== Transport ==
Kabalo is the junction of railway lines to the north and to Lake Tanganyika in the east.

It is served by Kabalo Airport.

== See also ==
- Railway stations in DRCongo
