= Ilebo =

- Location in Democratic Republic of the Congo
- Coordinates: 4°19′S 20°36′E
- Country: Democratic Republic of the Congo
- Province: Kasai
- Climate: Aw
- National language: Tshiluba

Ilebo, formerly known as Port-Francqui, is a town in Kasai province in the Democratic Republic of Congo, lying at the highest navigable point of the Kasaï River. It is an important transport hub for ferries to Kinshasa and trains to Lubumbashi.

== Overview ==
Ilebo was founded in the 17th century as a trading center and residence of the local rulers. It flourished in the 19th century and was, prior to the arrival of the Belgians, the largest settlement in the Central Congo with an estimated population of 5000 people. Ilebo was connected to other settlements via the river and several sand roads that were passable by porters. In 1901 the Belgian colonial administration renamed Ilebo Port-Francqui.

The city rapidly grew under the Belgian colonial administration, especially after the railway line to Lubumbashi was opened. There were plans to extend the railway line to Kinshasa, and the construction of a bridge over the Kasai river began in 1935, but was stopped after the unfinished bridge collapsed on 12 September 1937. During the Second World War the city grew massively in size, due to the influx of workers to the local industry manufacturing arms for the war effort. After independence the original name of the city was restored.

== Railways ==
In September 2007 an agreement was signed for China to fund the construction of a railway from Ilebo to Kinshasa. about 700 km.

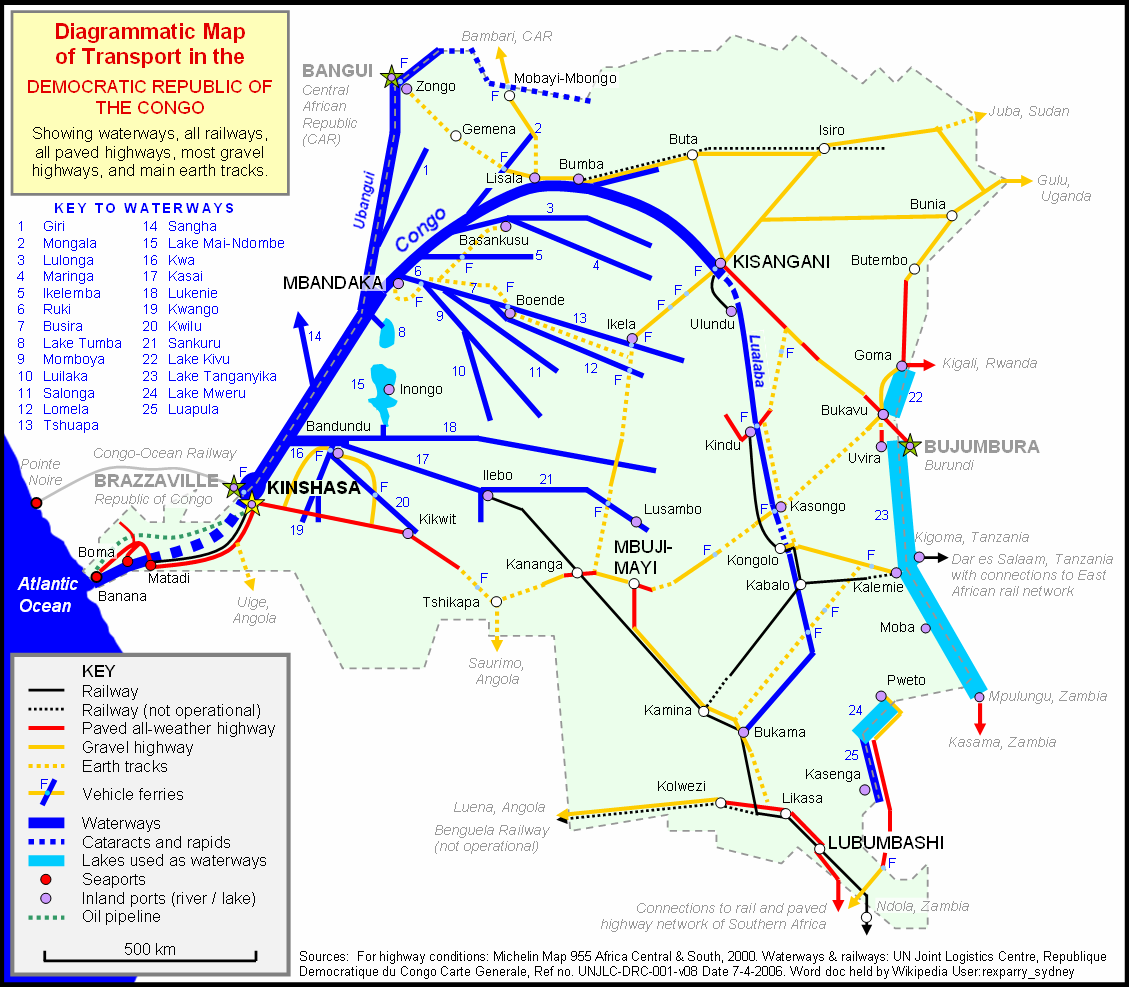
Diagrammatic Map of rail and other methods of surface transport in the DRC

== Namesakes ==
There are a number of other towns in Congo sharing this name.

== See also ==
- Railway stations in DRCongo
