= Tenke, Democratic Republic of the Congo =

Tenke
- Location in the Democratic Republic of the Congo
- Coordinates: 10°35′00″S 26°07′00″E
- Country: DR Congo
- Province: Lualaba
- Time zone: UTC+2 (Central Africa Time)

Tenke is a town in the Lualaba province of the Democratic Republic of the Congo.

== Economy ==
The main economic activity of the city is mining, mainly from the Tenke Fungurume Mine.

Another important economic activity is logistics services.

== Transport ==
=== Road ===
The city is crossed by Transafican Highway 9 (TAH 9), which connects it to the cities of Likasi and Kolwezi.

=== Rail ===
It is the junction of the national railway network of Congo, connecting the Benguela railway to the Cape to Cairo Railway.

== See also ==
- Railway stations in DRCongo
