= Kamatanda =

Region of the Democratic Republic of the Congo

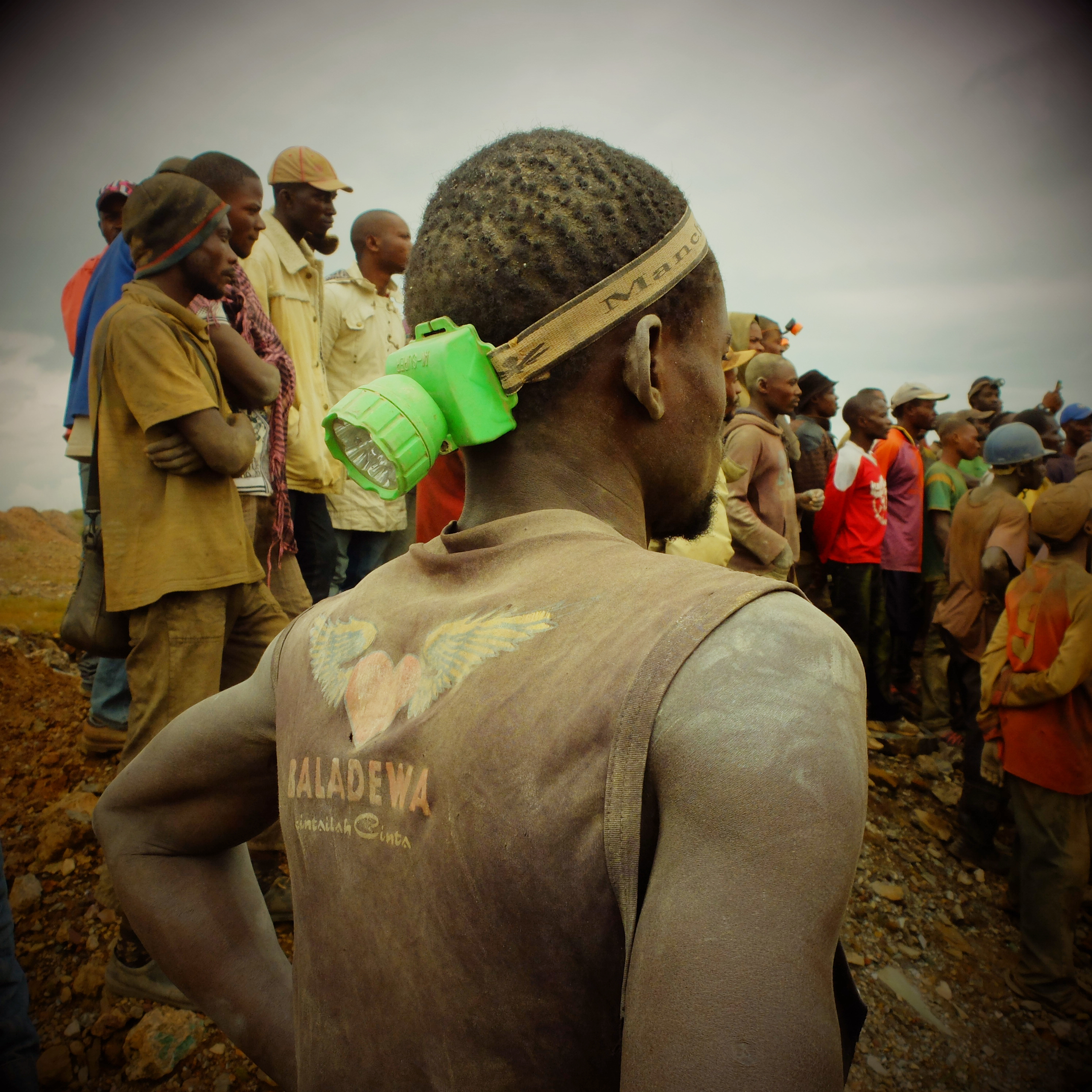
- Miners from Kamatanda

- Location within Democratic Republic of the Congo
- Location: Likasi, Haut-Katanga Province, Democratic Republic of the Congo; 10.953004°S 26.772802°E
- Products: Copper, cobalt
- Type: Open pit

Kamatanda is a region just north of Likasi in the Haut-Katanga Province of the Democratic Republic of the Congo. It gives its name to an open-pit copper mine, a railway junction, an abandoned airport and a residential area of Likasi.

The Sanga people mined copper at Kamatanda in the pre-colonial period. The Belgian Union Minière du Haut-Katanga (UMHK) was established in 1906 and took over the mine. In 1966 possession passed to the state-owned Gécamines. Gécamines allowed artisanal miners to operate the mine, working in dangerous conditions for very low pay. The miners established an informal residential community around the mine, which suffered from lack of clean water and power, lack of drainage and pollution. Starting in 2016 Gécamines began modernizing the operation. A new ore crushing plant came into operation in 2019.

== Location ==
In the early days Kamatanda was also called Sofumwango. It is in the Kambove District of Haut-Katanga Province. It is a few kilometers northeast of Likasi. The Köppen climate classification is Cwa : Monsoon-influenced humid subtropical climate.

== Transport ==
The Kamatanda junction on the Sakania–Bukama section of the Compagnie du chemin de fer du bas-Congo au Katanga (BCK) railway was at an elevation of 3,962 feet (1,208 m). As of 1944 it had branches leading to Jadotville (Likasi), Kambove and Panda. The 29.6 kilometres (18.4 mi) branch line from Kamatanda Junction to the mines of Kambove opened on 15 June 1913. The complete 114.3 kilometres (71.0 mi) line from Jadotville via Kamatanda Junction and Tenke to Tshilongo opened on 15 July 1914. The abandoned Kamatanda Airport is to the north of the mine. It is at an elevation of 1,299 metres (4,262 ft) above sea level.

== Mining ==
=== Pre-colonial ===
Long before the Belgians arrived in Katanga the Sanga people engaged in copper mining there. Sanga mines in the area between the Lufira and the Lualaba included Kamatanda, Likasi, Kambove, Msesa, Kalabi and Kakanda. From 1850 to 1910 they may have produced about 700 tonnes of the metal. When the Belgians took over, the traditional chiefs lost significant powers.

=== Colonial era ===
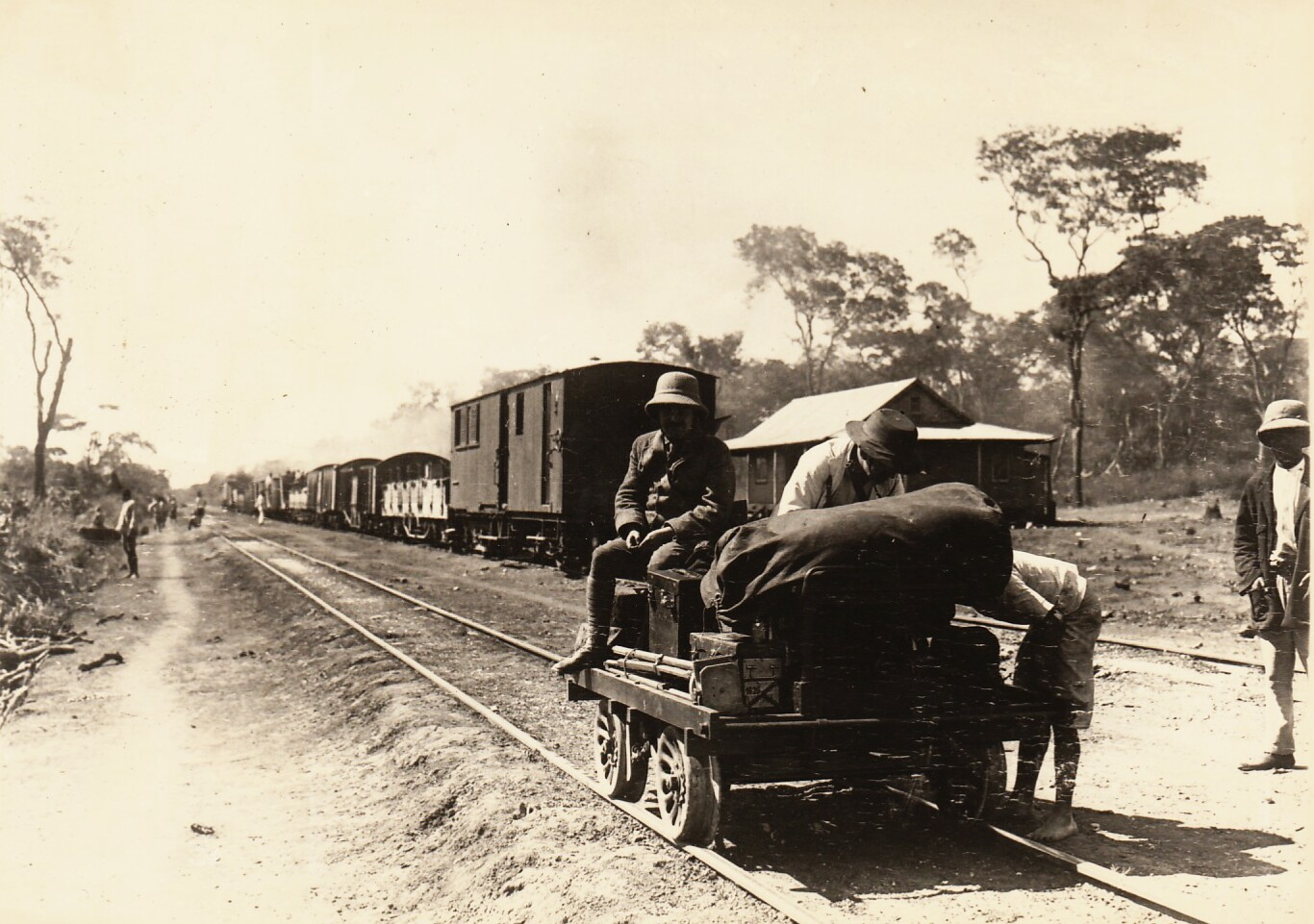
Congo Railways - Kamatanda - A view of the train station area c. 1910

John R. Farrell, an American mining engineer employed by Robert Williams, managing director of Tanganyika Concessions, produced a detailed report based on his "personal examination" of the Kamatanda mine and others in the region during the dry season of 1902. However, there is some doubt about whether he actually visited the mine. The Union Minière du Haut-Katanga (UMHK) was founded in 1906 as a joint venture by the Compagnie du Katanga, the Comité Spécial du Katanga and Tanganyika Concessions.

Émile Richet issued a report for UMHK in 1923 that discussed prospecting in the Kamatanda block. Plans of the Kamatanda polygon and mine by the UMHK from 1914–1923 have been preserved. A 1932 report described results of prospecting in the Kamatanda area with three wells of 20 metres (66 ft) depth, galleries and trenches. Mineralization was mainly found in foliated siliceous rocks.

A call for a general strike of mineworkers spread through the region in November and December 1941. Some of the workers at Kamatanda, Kolwezi and Kamoto, influenced by millennial sects like the Watchtower movement, saw the call for a strike as a millennial wake.

=== Gécamines ===
Joseph-Désiré Mobutu seized power in a bloodless coup in 1965. In December 1966 he seized the assets of UMHK, and in January 1967 transferred them to a parastatal called Générale Congolaise des Minérais (Gecomin). This was renamed Générale des Carrières et des Mines (Gécamines) in 1971.

As of 2003 the Kamatanda Mine had estimated annual capacity of 57,000 metric tons of copper and 4,000 metric tons of cobalt. In 2005 the Chinese company COBEC began talks with the Ministry of Mines over reviving mining in Kamatanda and rehabilitating three ore processing units there. A residential area grew up around the mine. In 2005 Groupe Bazano set up a pyrometallurgic plant in Kamatanda on the Abattoirs Avenue. The inhabitants of the residential quarter complained of the dust and smoke emitted by the plant's furnaces. As of 2012 the residential area had no drainage system for rainwater or wastewater. There were no connection to the REGIDESO drinking water supply, so water had to be carried from older neighborhoods. There were no connections to the SNEL electric network.

A 2008 Bloomberg Markets report described the 2.5 square kilometres (0.97 sq mi) mine as an area of land in which pits and holes up to 25 metres (82 ft) deep had been dug by freelance men, women and children. The diggers climbed down into the holes without ladders, barefoot and only lightly dressed. They used head torches and candles to see as they dug out ore from horizontal corridors using hammers and chisels, small shovels and pickaxes and bare hands. They sold the ore to middlemen who paid others to screen it in the river and then sold it to a smelter in Lubumbashi. The owner, Gécomines, was not involved in the process. Saesscam, a state agency, charged the workers 18 cents per 110 pounds (50 kg) bag of ore. The ore was purchased by a subsidiary of Zhejiang Huayou Cobalt.

In March 2008 there was a violent clash between diggers and riot police in Lukasi. Police had forcibly removed some of the miners from Kamatanda. Later police fired on several hundred miners who were protesting in Likasi. 32 were injured and one died. The diggers were protesting against plans by Gécamines to evict them and reclaim the mine. Early in 2009 there were further protests at Kamatanda, this time against Vanger, a processing company that was trying to get EMAK to grant it a monopoly on buying ore. As of 2010 about 400 children from Kamatanda and the surrounding villages were helping about 2,000 diggers. The children sorted, carried and cleaned the ore for wages of under US$4 per day. Parents often relied on the income and encouraged their children to leave school and work at the mine.

In February 2014 Martin Kobler, head of the United Nations Mission in the Democratic Republic of the Congo (Monusco), visited the mine. There were about 400 artisanal miners working in the area, mostly from 15 to 49 years old, but before the visit police had chased away younger children who usually carried the ore from the workings to wash it in a nearby stream. In the dry season, when there is less risk of landslides, as many as 2,000 people may be working the deposits. Kobler was told that the miners were producing about 8 tonnes of ore daily, fetching an average of $200 per ton. Typical earnings are $4 per day, but workers have to pay over 50 cents to public officials or unions to enter the site.

In August 2016 Gécamines said it planned to increase copper production by up to 40%. This would be achieved by a new concentrator at the Kambove site, new electrical lines and an ore-crushing machine at the Kamatanda mine. A $17 million crushing plant was installed in Kamatanda that became operational at the start of 2019. The crushed ore is fed to the Heap Leach Unit in Panda, then the copper-containing solution is taken to the electrolysis room at the Shituru Factories, where high-quality copper electrodes are produced.

== Sources ==
- AFP (17 July 2010), "DR Congo children quit school for mines", Dawn
- AFP (8 February 2014), "RDC: les creuseurs de Kamatanda s'accrochent à "leur" mine malgré tout", Jeune Afrique (in French)
- Beauvent, Emiy (June 2017), "Tintin a Lubudi ?" (PDF), Mémoires du Congo et du Ruanda-Urundi (42)
- Brion, René; Moreau, Jean-Louis, Inventaire des archives du groupe de l'Union Minière (1906 - 1986) (in French), Archives de l'État en Belgique
- Bwenda, Christian (December 2012), Mining Exploitation in Katanga Province: Local's Communities Given Up (PDF), PREMICONGO
- Clark, Simon; Smith, Michael; Wild, Franz (September 2008), Young Workers, Deadly Mines (PDF), vol. China in Africa: Special Report, Bloomberg Markets
- Coakley, George J. (2003), "The Mineral Industry of Congo (Kinshasa)" (PDF), U.S. Geological Survey Minerals Yearbook
- De Koning, Ruben (October 2009), Artisanal Mining and Postconflict Reconstruction in the Democratic Republic of the Congo (PDF), SIPRI
- Dolay Tshimanga (16 April 2019), "Le nouveau visage de Gécamines", Business et Finances (in French), Likasi
- Higginson, John (1989), A Working Class in the Making: Belgian Colonial Labor Policy, Private Enterprise, and the African Mineworker, 1907-1951, Univ of Wisconsin Press, ISBN 9780299120702
- Jean Omasombo Tshonda (2018), Haut-Katanga (PDF) (in French), Musée Royal de l'Afrique Centrale, ISBN 978-9-4926-6907-0
- "Kamatanda Airport (FZQI)", ourairports.com
- "Kamatanda, Province du Haut-Katanga, Democratic Republic of the Congo", mindat.org
- "Kobaltminen im Kongo – In der Grube wartet der Tod", Cicero (in German)
- Lithostratigraphy and deposit description, prospection work and tectonic (breccia) in the Kamatanda area, UMHK
- Naval Intelligence Division (April 1944), The Belgian Congo, Geographical Handbook
- Oliver, Roland; Sanderson, G.N., eds. (1975), The Cambridge History of Africa, Cambridge University Press, ISBN 978-0-521-22803-9
- "Congo state miner says to increase copper output 40 pct this year". Reuters. 13 August 2016.
- Särkkä, Timo (2016), The Lure of Katanga Copper : Tanganyika Concessions Limited and the Anatomy of Mining and Mine Exploration 1899–1906 (PDF), UNISA Press; Taylor & Francis
- Timothy Mwangeka Makori (June 2015), When the Future is in Reverse: Temporality in the aftermath of Industrialism in Democratic Republic of Congo (PDF), Dakar, Senegal: CODESRIA
- "Way: Kamatanda Airport (abandoned) (702689526)", OpenStreetMap
- Yav, André (1990), Johannes Fabian (ed.), History from Below: The Vocabulary of Elisabethville by André Yav : Texts, Translation, and Interpretive Essay, John Benjamins Publishing, ISBN 9027252270
- Young, Crawford; Turner, Thomas Edwin (2013), The Rise and Decline of the Zairian State (illustrated, reprint ed.), Madison: University of Wisconsin Press, ISBN 9780299101138
