= Compagnie de Chemin de fer du Katanga =

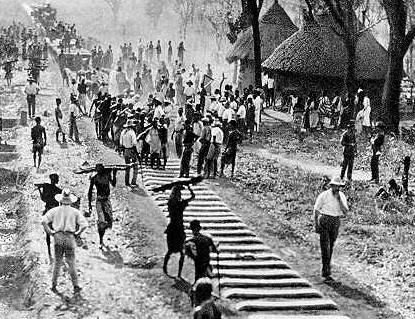
- Chemin de fer de Katanga reaches Elisabethville in 1910
- Trade name: BCK
- Type: Railway company
- Founded: 11 March 1902
- Defunct: 1952
- Area served: Congo Free State / Belgian Congo

The Compagnie de Chemin de fer du Katanga (CFK) was a railway company in the Congo Free State and Belgian Congo between 1902 and 1952. It held the railway concession that linked the port of Bukama on the navigable section of the Lualaba River through the mining region and the town of Elisabethville (Lubumbashi) to Sakania, where it connected with the Rhodesian railway network. Operations were subcontracted to the Compagnie du chemin de fer du bas-Congo au Katanga (BCK).

== Background ==
The Compagnie du Katanga was founded in 1891 to explore the southeast of the Congo Free State. Under agreements of March 1891 and May 1896 the company was to occupy and develop Katanga, and in return gained full ownership of 1/3 of the land in Katanga Province and a 99 year license to exploit the minerals in the granted land. Given the difficulty of determining the land boundaries, in 1900 the Compagnie du Katanga and the Congo Free State created the Comité Spécial du Katanga (CSK) to manage all the territory, with profits shared between the Compagnie du Katanga (1/3) and the Free State (2/3).

Katanga had huge mineral potential but was completely isolated from the ocean. Railways were needed to carry exports to overseas markets. To the south, railways were built from South Africa to Bulawayo in Rhodesia (Zimbabwe), and from Mozambique to Salisbury (Harare) in Rhodesia, a link from Bulawayo to Salisbury was started and a northern extension was planned.

== Creation ==
Railways in the Congo

The Comité Spécial du Katanga (CSK) created the Compagnie de Chemin de fer du Katanga (CFK) on 11 March 1902. It had a capital of 1,000,000 francs. The Congo Free State held 2,400 shares and the businessman and industrialist Robert Williams held 1,600 shares. Théodore Heyvaert was president and Robert Williams was vice-president. The CFK was to build links to the region where the city of Elisabethville (Lubumbashi) would be founded. It would create a line from the south of Katanga to a point to be defined between a confluence of the Lufira and the Lualaba where it would connect to the Rhodesian network.

== History ==
The Commandant Alphonse Jacques, future general and Baron de Dixmude, led an expedition in 1903 to find a route linking the navigable part of the Lualaba to the southern border of Katanga. He decided against using the Lufira valley, and recommended the port of Bukama on the Lualaba as the terminus of the line. The line would pass through what became Elisabethville (Lubumbashi) and connect to the Rhodesian railway at Sakania.

On 31 October 1906 the CSK, the Congo Free State and the Société Générale de Belgique founded the Compagnie du chemin de fer du bas-Congo au Katanga (BCK) to build a rail link from Bukama to Port Franqui on the Kasai River and to carry out mining research in a defined area. Jean Jadot, who had built the 2,215 kilometres (1,376 mi) Beijing–Hankou railway in China, was made managing director. The BCK controlled the CFK on behalf of the government. BCK was responsible for all the track in Katanga, and operated the network and equipment as a whole, while CSK owned the concession.

In 1952 the Société des Chemins de fer Léopoldville-Katanga-Dilolo (LKD) merged with CFK to form the Société des Chemins de fer Katanga-Dilolo-Léopoldville (KDL). KDL held all the rail network concessions in Katanga, while BCK was the operator.

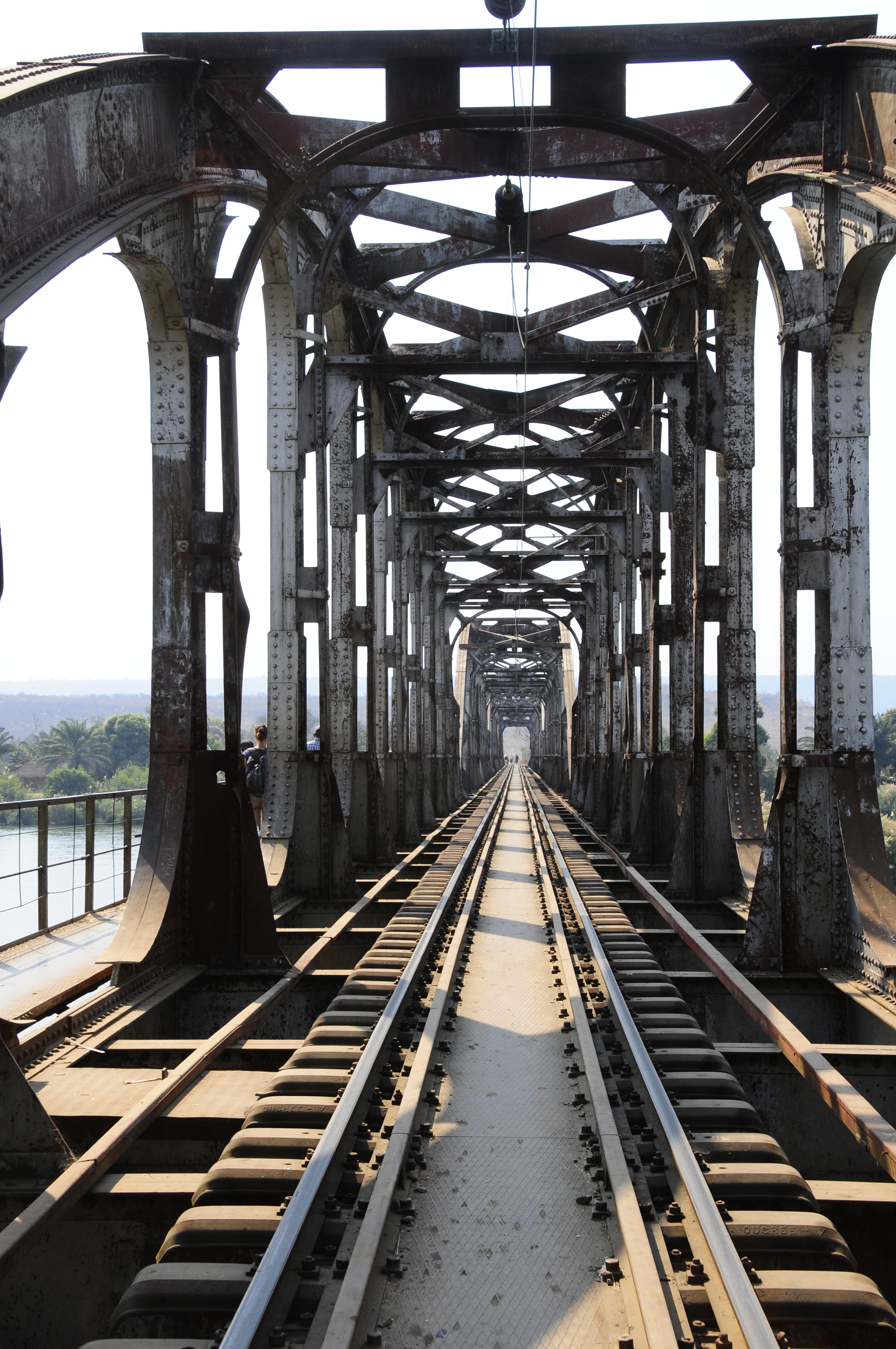
Bukama bridge

== Network ==
- Sakania – Lubumbashi (Elisabethville), 241.7 kilometres (150.2 mi) opened 1 October 1910
- Lubumbashi – Ruashi Mine, 15.2 kilometres (9.4 mi), opened 1 November 1910 (branch line)
- Lubumbashi – Bukama
  - Lubumbashi – Likasi (Jadotville), 140.5 kilometres (87.3 mi), opened 15 June 1913
  - Likasi - Kamatanda Junction,
  - Kamatanda Junction – Tenke - Tshilongo River, 114.3 kilometres (71.0 mi), opened 15 July 1914
  - Tshilongo River – Lubudi, 89.4 kilometres (55.6 mi), opened 1 April 1918
  - Lubudi – Bukama, 114.4 kilometres (71.1 mi), opened 22 May 1918
- Kamatanda Junction – Kambove mines, 29.6 kilometres (18.4 mi), opened 15 June 1913 (branch line)
- Kambove – Kamfundwa Mine, 8.9 kilometres (5.5 mi), opened 1924 (branch line)
- Likasi – Panda – Kakontwe, 6.6 kilometres (4.1 mi), opened 1928 (branch line)

== See also ==
- Rail transport in the Democratic Republic of the Congo

== Sources ==
- BCK - KDL - Le site des chemins de fer du Katanga, 2010, archived from the original on 2010-12-04
- Bobb, F. Scott (2010), "Railways" (PDF), Historical Dictionary of the Democratic Republic of the Congo (3 ed.), Scarecrow Press, ISBN 978-0-8108-6325-5
- "Les Compagnies ferroviaires", Congo Poste
