= Tanganyika Concessions Limited =

Former British mining and railway company in Africa

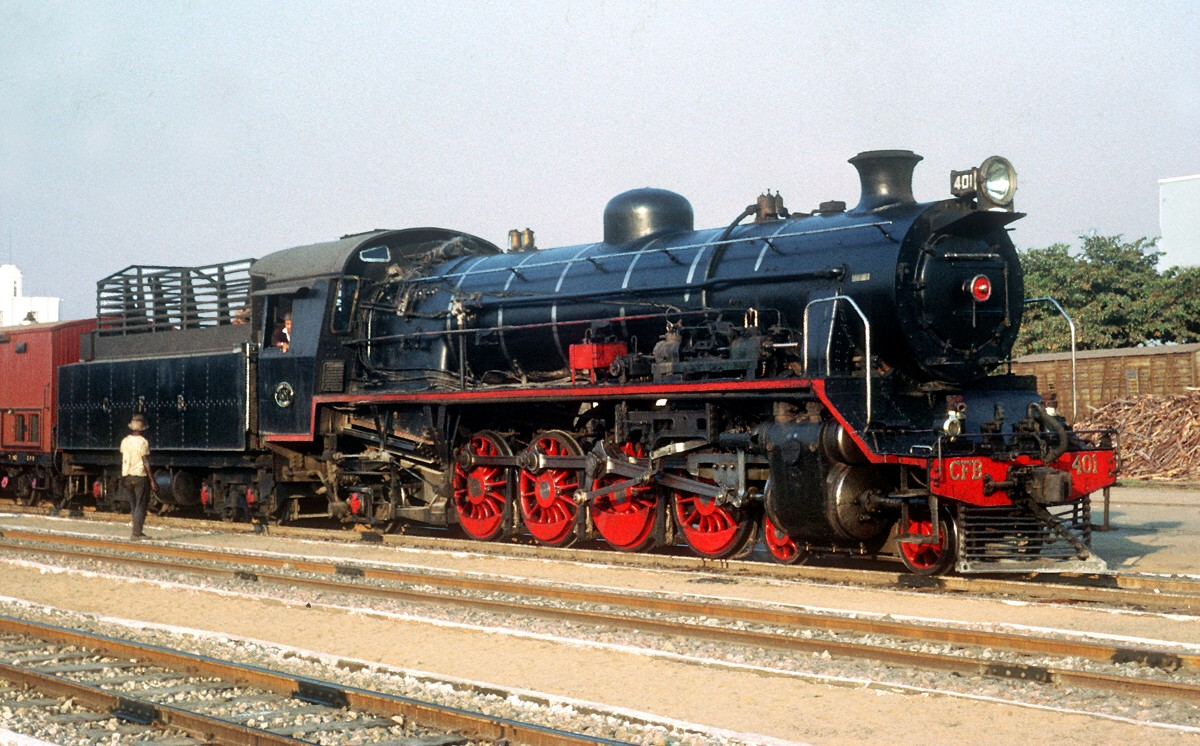
- Benguela railway, coal fired 11th Class 4-8-2 no. 401 at Lobito Station in Angola
- Trade name: TCL, Tanks
- Type: Mining and railway
- Industry: mining financial service activities, except insurance and pension funding
- Founded: 1899
- Founder: Robert Williams
- Headquarters: London, United Kingdom
- Area served: Congo Free State, Belgian Congo / Democratic Republic of the Congo
- Parent: Zambesia Exploring

Tanganyika Concessions Limited (Note: The name refers to Lake Tanganyika, which was bordered by Northern Rhodesia, the Congo Free State and German East Africa. After World War I (1914–1918) German East Africa was divided into the Belgian territory of Ruanda-Urundi and the British territory of Tanganyika.) (TCL or Tanks) was a British mining and railway company founded by the Scottish engineer and entrepreneur Robert Williams in 1899. The purpose was to exploit minerals in Northern Rhodesia and in the Congo Free State. Partly-owned subsidiaries included the Union Minière du Haut-Katanga (UMHK), which undertook mining in the Katanga portion of the copperbelt, and the Benguela railway, which provided a rail link across Angola to the Atlantic Ocean. Belgian banks eventually took over control of the company. The Angolan railway concession was returned to the state of Angola in 2001.

== Foundation and concessions ==
Tanganyika Concessions Ltd. was created on 20 January 1899 by Robert Williams, an associate of Cecil Rhodes. Originally all the shareholders were British. Daisy Greville, Countess of Warwick, (Note: Lady Warwick was a mistress of Albert Edward, Prince of Wales. Cecil Rhodes had advised her to invest in TCL.) was one of the shareholders. The purpose was to exploit minerals in Northern Rhodesia and in the Congo Free State. Williams intended to secure a mining concession that the British South Africa Company had granted on 26 May 1898. It covered more than 2,000 square miles (5,200 km^{2}) north of the Zambezi river with exclusive rights for prospecting and locating 1,000 claims. The Zambesia Exploring Company Limited (ZE) acquired the majority of the shares, and ZE and TCL were run as one company. Tanganyika Concessions share prices were very unstable in the early years. During one period of a few days the price went from 2 1/4 to 13 pounds per share and then crashed.

In 1900 the Compagnie du Katanga and the Congo Free State created the Comité Spécial du Katanga (CSK) to manage all the territory in Katanga, with profits shared between the Compagnie du Katanga (1/3) and the Free State (2/3). On 8 December 1900 the Comité Spécial du Katanga granted TCL exclusive prospecting rights for five years in an area of 60,000 square miles (160,000 km^{2}) of Katanga adjoining Rhodesia, and an annual subsidy of £10,000. TCL was authorized to exploit the mines that were found with CSK for 30 years. The term was eventually extended to 89 years. The CSK reserved the rights to 60% of the profits from any mines that might be opened.

== Early explorations ==
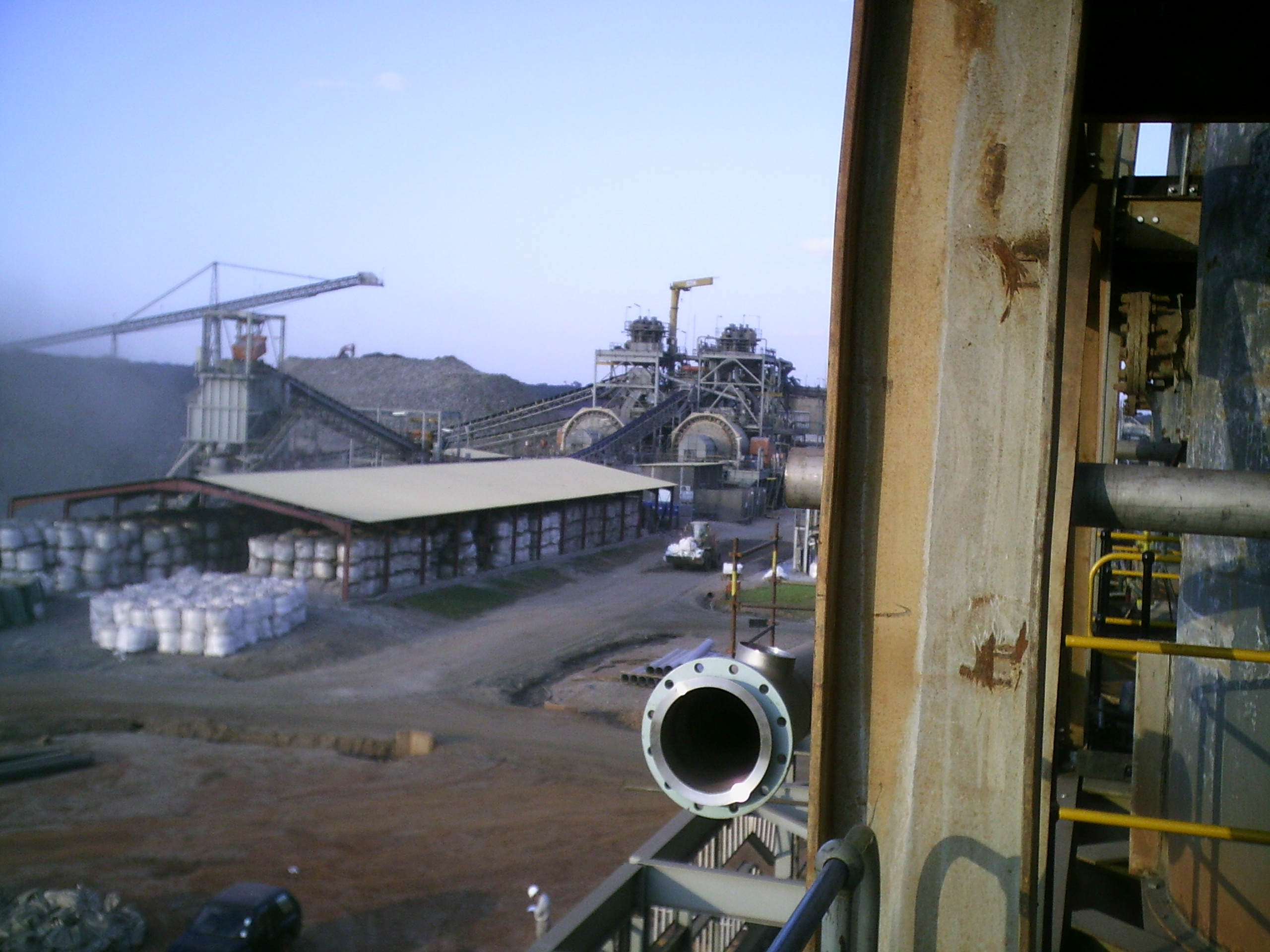
Kansanshi copper mine

Williams sent an exploratory team which set out for the Congo-Zambesi watershed on 5 April 1899. There were five Europeans and 35 Africans led by the geologist George Grey (1868–1911), younger brother of Sir Edward Grey. About´10 miles (16 km) south of the border they found the workings of the ancient Kansanshi copper mine, and on 6 September 1899 staked claims there for TCL. Grey returned to Bulawayo to cable his findings to Williams on 24 November 1899, and indicated that the bulk of the ore seemed to be in Katanga. He described the copper deposits as "scandalously rich". Williams tried unsuccessfully to interest King Leopold II of Belgium in full-scale exploitation of the copper belt. Leopold was starting to earn high returns from rubber and ivory exports, and resented British criticism of his brutal treatment of the local people, so held back.

After TCL had gained the CSK concession, on 15 April 1901 a larger second expedition set out to Kansanshi. Another expedition left for Katanga via Abercorn (Mbala), and set up camp at the Kambove mine. Between June and October 1902 prospectors staked 50 claims in Katanga. There were many ancient copper workings, which were located by the simple method of asking local people where they could find copper.

== Later history ==
The CSK created the Compagnie de Chemin de fer du Katanga (CFK) in 1902. It had a capital of 1,000,000 francs. The Congo Free State held 2,400 shares and Robert Williams held 1,600 shares. Théodore Heyvaert was president and Robert Williams was vice-president. The CFK was to build links to the region where the city of Elisabethville (Lubumbashi) would be founded. One line would connect to the Rhodesian railways at Sakania, while another would connect to the port of Bukama on the Lualaba River.

In early 1903 Williams discussed building a railway from Lobito on the Atlantic coast of Angola to the copper mines with the contractors Pauling & Co., but the costs proved excessive. Instead, the Rhodesian railway was extended north from Bulawayo via the Wankie (Hwange) coal fields and Victoria Falls, reaching Kalomo in 1905 and Broken Hill (Kabwe) in 1906. The TCL concession in Katanga expired on 28 October 1906 and the Union Minière du Haut-Katanga (UMHK) was formed to exploit the deposits. The Compagnie du Chemin de fer du Bas-Congo au Katanga was founded on 31 October 1906 to build and operate a line linking Bukama to Port Francqui (Ilebo) on the Kasai River, from where minerals could be shipped to the Atlantic via Léopoldville (Kinshasa). Robert Williams took only a minimal direct stake, while the UMHK had almost 10%, and the state became the main shareholder.

The Société Générale de Belgique and the associated Banque d'Outremer purchased a minority share in TCL in 1923. In 1946 the French Government transferred 1,667,961 Ordinary shares of 10s. each in Tanganyika Concessions Ltd to the Bank of England, which the Bank agreed to sell to an Anglo-Belgian group. These were about 19% of the voting power of all shareholders. As of 1946 TCL held 20% of the voting power in Union Minière du Haut-Katanga and 90% of the voting power in the Benguela Railway.

In 1950 the company headquarters were moved to Salisbury, Rhodesia (Harare, Zimbabwe). As of 1978 the headquarters were in Nassau, Bahamas, and shareholders included the Oppenheimer Group, the Rockefeller Group and other American interests. In 1981 Société Générale de Belgique acquired a controlling interest in TCL, which still owned 90% of the Benguela Railway.

== Subsidiaries ==
=== Partial list ===
The structure of the TCL group was complex and fluid, Subsidiaries included:

- Union Minière du Haut Katanga
- Benguela Railway Company
- Benguela Estates Ltd
- Rhodesia-Katanga Company Ltd
- Kentan Gold Areas Ltd
- Geita Gold Mining Company Ltd
- Nile Congo Divide Syndicate Ltd
- Zambesia Exploring Company Ltd.

=== Union Minière du Haut-Katanga ===
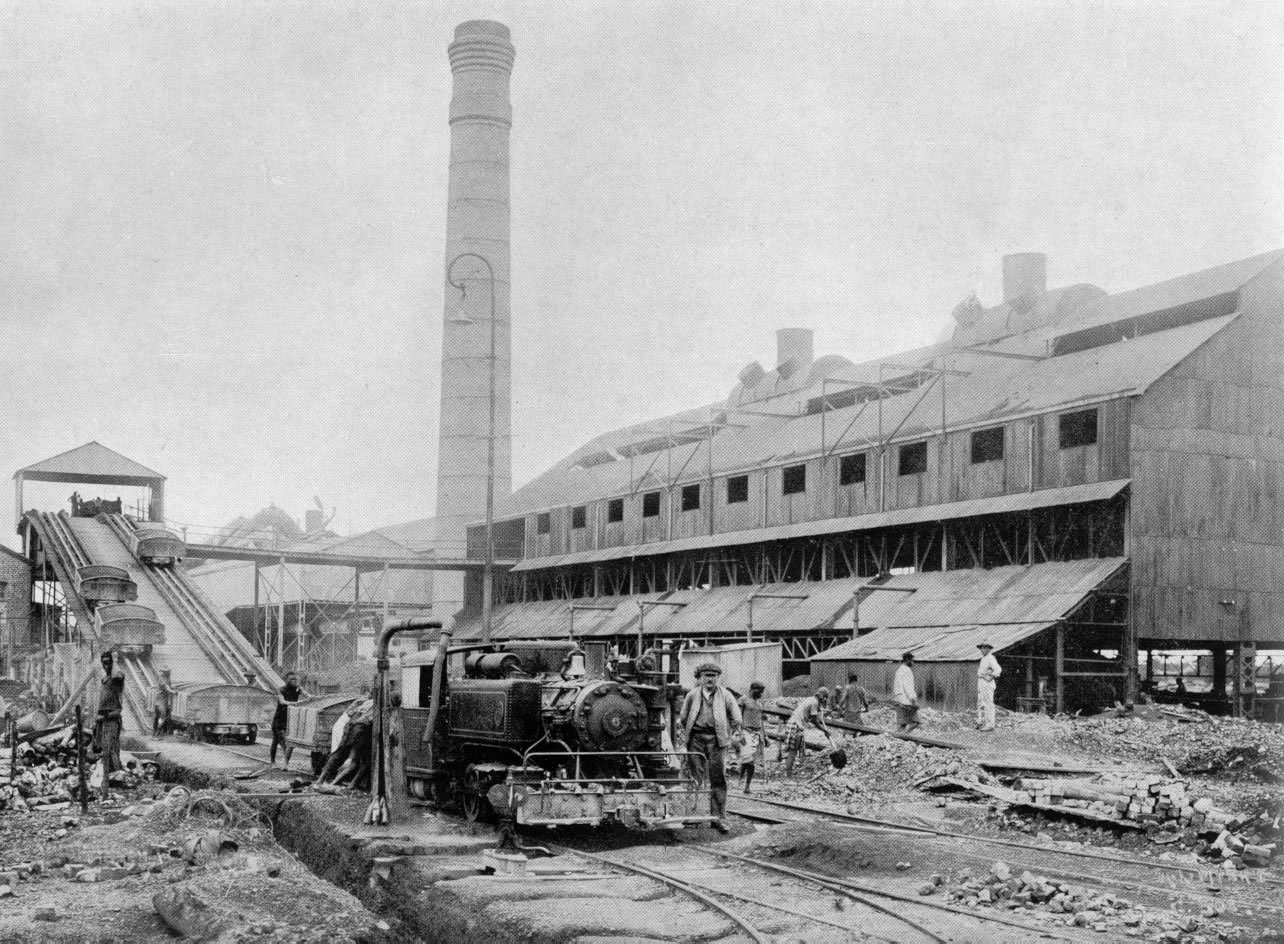
UMHK ore processing in Élisabethville (modern-day Lubumbashi) in 1917

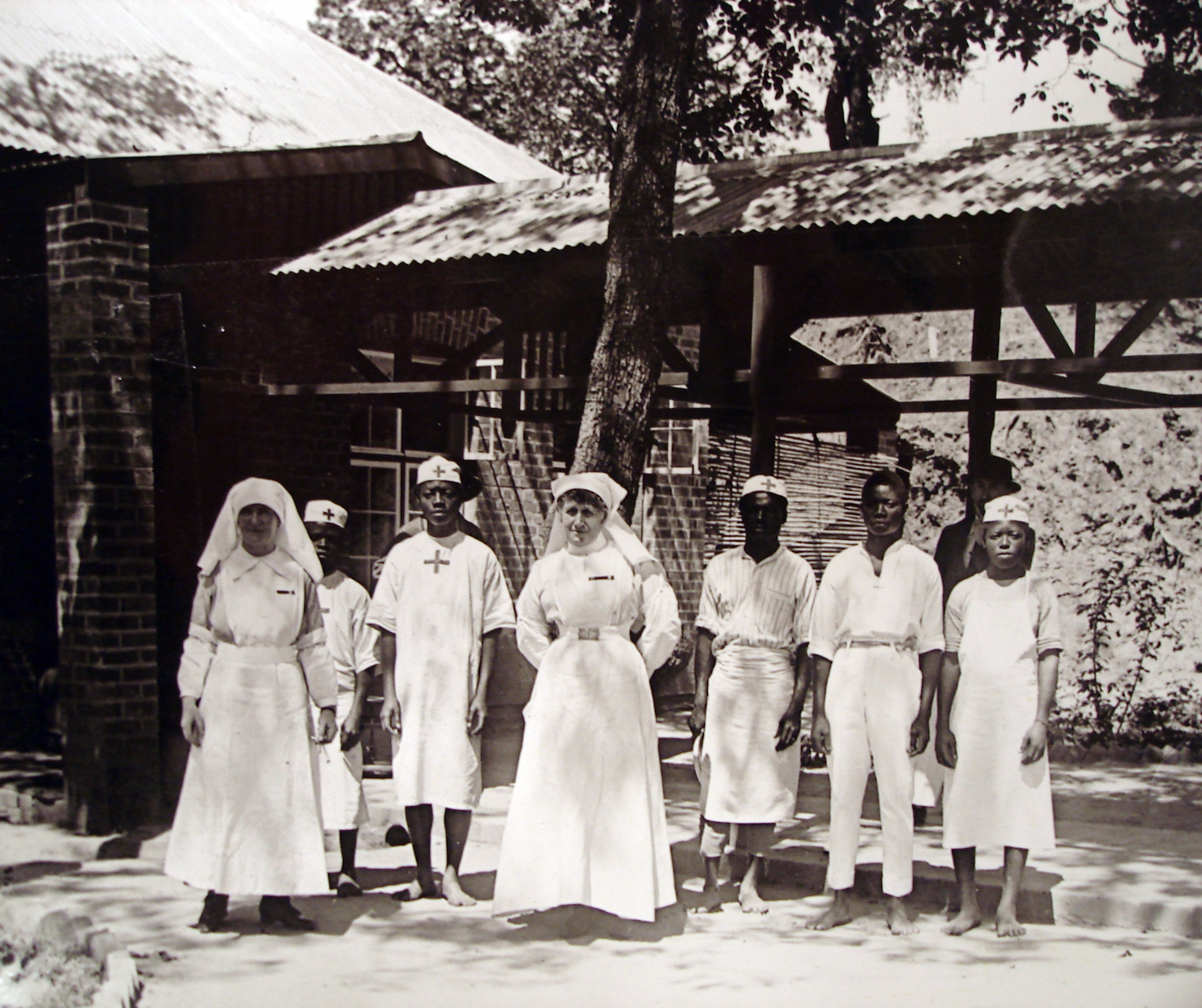
UMHK Nurses and assistants 1918

TCL was a partner with the Société Générale de Belgique, a Belgian investment holding, in the Union Minière du Haut-Katanga (UMHK), which exploited copper deposits in Katanga Province. The UMHK was founded in 1906 to develop mines in Katanga. It was also to participate in building a railway to carry material and equipment to the mines and to take away the extracted minerals. The Société Générale participated in setting up the UMHK under the direction of Jean Jadot.

The UMHK was the result of a compromise between the Free State and the Compagnie de Katanga as owners of the mineral deposit (through the CSK), the TCL who had found the mines, and the TCL and Société Générale de Belgique who would fund their exploitation. UMHK was founded as a joint venture between the Compagnie du Katanga, the CSK and TCL. The Compagnie du Katanga was in turn a subsidiary of the Compagnie du Congo pour le Commerce et l'Industrie (CCCI), which was controlled by the Société Générale de Belgique.

UMHK became the third largest copper producer in the world, the largest cobalt and radium producer and one of the largest producers of germanium. Ownership was complicated and often changed. The Société Générale effectively controlled the UMHK from its inception to 1960. As of 1946 TCL held 20% of the voting power in the UMHK. The president of TCL sat on the UMHK board, as did one TCL administrator. In 1960, just before independence of the Democratic Republic of the Congo and the dissolution of the CSK, ownership was:

Shareholder	Shares	Votes
General public	53.99%	36.12%
CSKꜛ	25.41%	35.73%
TCL	14.47%	20.21%
Société Générale	4.64%	6.94%
Cie du Katanga	1.49%	1.00%
ꜛCSK was owned 2/3 by the state and 1/3 by the Cie du Katanga.

In December 1966 President Mobutu Sese Seko announced that a new company (later named Société Génerale Congolaise de Minerais (Gécamines) would take over from UMHK as of 2 January 1967. The new company have headquarters in Lubumbashi and would be owned 55% by the state. 15% would be offered to TCL and 30% would be offered to the public. TCL declined to participate, and eventually Gécamines became 100% state-owned.

=== Benguela railway ===
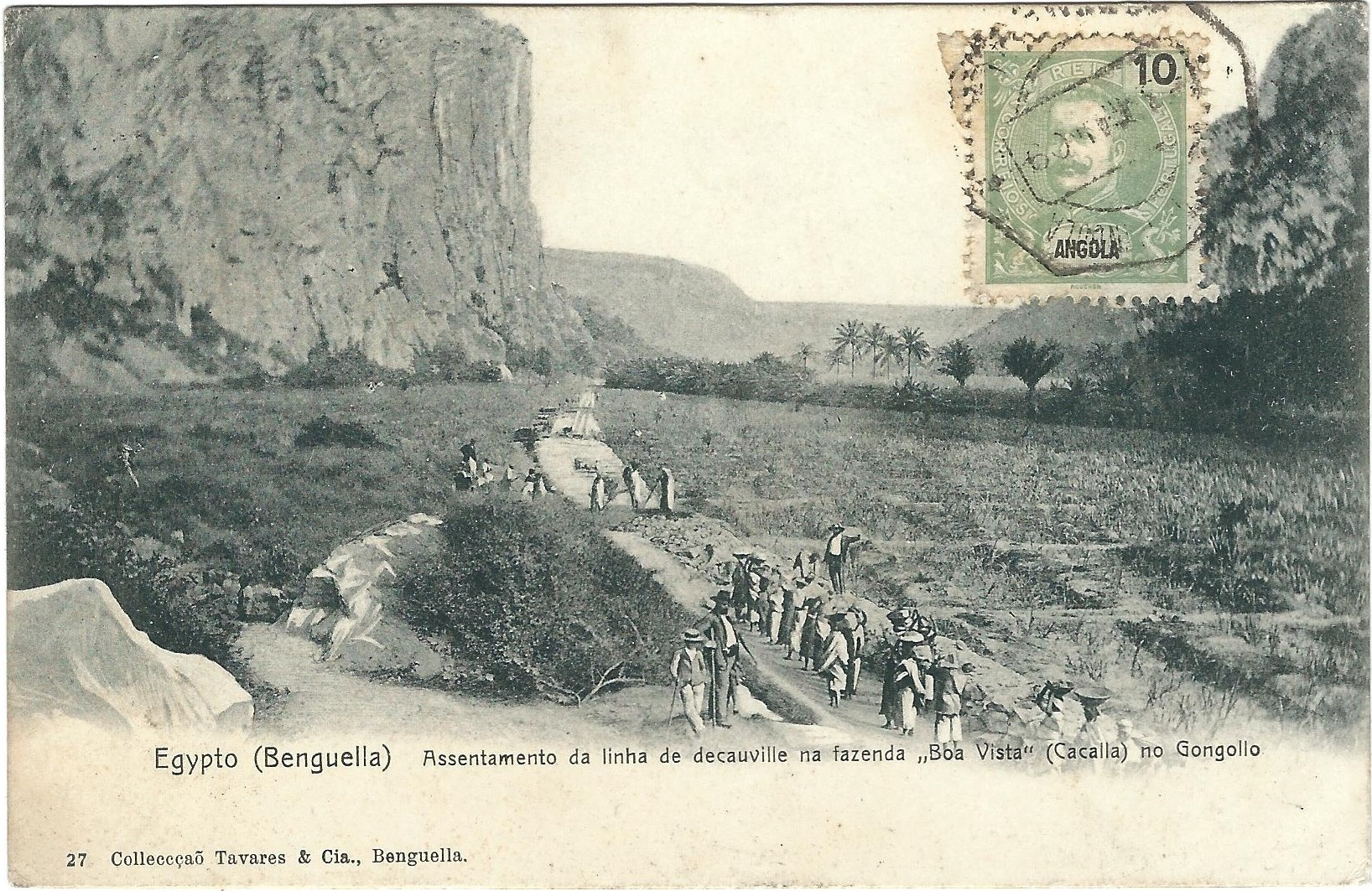
Laying a section of the Benguela line

Williams became involved in building the Benguela railway, which was to carry minerals from the copper belt to the Atlantic port of Lobito near Benguela. The Caminhos de Ferro de Benguela (CFB) was incorporated in Portugal in 1902, with a 99-year concession to build and operate the 1,345 kilometres (836 mi) railway. Its main purpose was to carry minerals for export. It ran from Lobito to Texeira de Sousa (Luau), then crossed the Luao River into the Belgian Congo at Dilolo. Construction lasted from 1903 to August 1928. It took another 22 months to complete the 324 miles (521 km) line from Dilolo to Tenke, where it connected with the Katanga network. The line was officially opened on 1 July 1931.

The Benguela railway was less successful than had been hoped, and most of the minerals were carried east by the Chemin de Fer du Bas-Congo au Katanga (BCK) and the Rhodesian railway to Beira, Mozambique. In 1975 the Benguela railway was closed in the unrest that followed independence. During the subsequent Angolan Civil War (1975–2002) the railway remained closed and the tracks, bridges and rolling stock were destroyed. The railway concession expired in 2001 and ownership passed to the Angolan government.

=== Benguela Estates ===
The Benguela Estates Company and the Zambezi Exploring Company, subsidiaries of TCL, controlled the largest agricultural enterprise in Angola. By 1933 they held 475,678 acres (192,500 ha) in the highlands, worth £214,000. The Benguela railway wanted to expand wheat production in the Ovimbundu region for export to the world market, and in 1932 made a considerable investment in developing more suitable strains of wheat for the government to distribute to Ovimbundu producers.

=== Rhodesia-Katanga Company ===
TCL made an agreement in 1908 with the government of the Belgian Congo to build a railway from Broken Hill to the Katanga Border. The Rhodesia-Katanga Junction Railway & Mineral Company was formed for this purpose, and also took over the Kansanshi mine and TCL's other copperbelt holdings. The company became the Rhodesia-Katanga Company in 1929.

=== Kentan Gold Areas ===
TCL learned that gold prospectors were having success in the area near Mgusu, southwest of Lake Victoria, and in 1934 formed Kentan Gold Area Limited to develop these finds. It did so through its subsidiaries Saragura Development Company Limited and Geita Gold Mining Company Limited. The Saragura Development Company explored holdings in the Saragura area of the Mwana District in Tanganyika in the 1930s. Saragura Development transferred the Geita Mine to the Geita Gold Mining Company. In 1958 Tanganyika Holdings Ltd. was providing office space and secretarial services to other companies in the group, had a large portfolio of investments including a sizable stake in Kentan, and was conducting an exploration program with companies that were not part of the group. On 7 October 1958 Kentan Gold Area and Zambesia Exploring announced that they were discussing amalgamation.

=== Geita Gold Mining Company ===
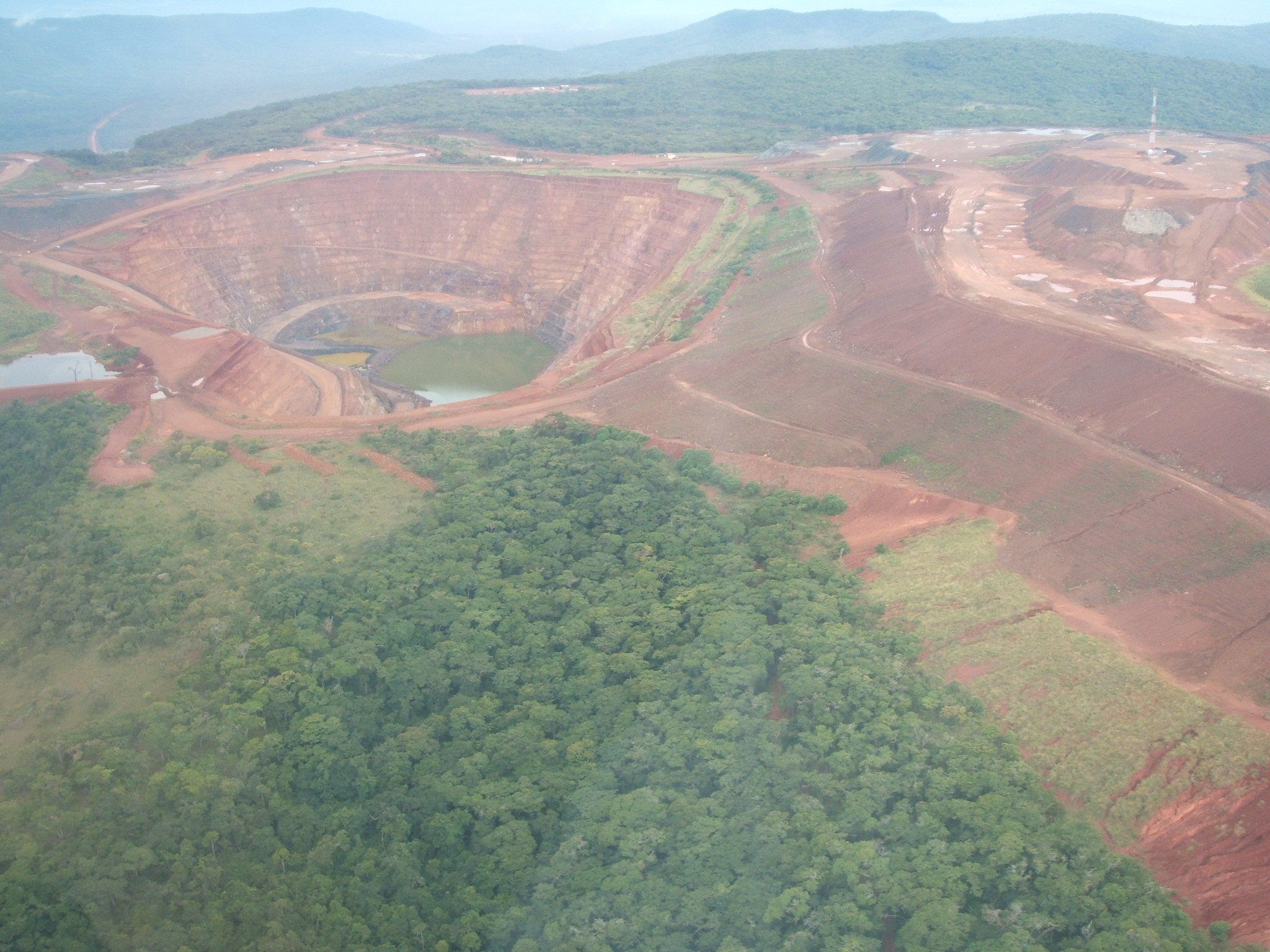
Geita open pit mine

The Geita Gold Mining Company was set up to operate the Geita Gold Mine in Tanganyika, which was transferred to it from the Sagura Development Company, a subsidiary of Kentan Gold Areas. Production began in 1936. A 1937 report said it hoped to soon start crushing 500 tons per day, and could well become the largest gold producer in East Africa. The company had built a road from the mine to Lake Victoria, where it had built a jetty. It had built housing, medical facilities, set up a private wireless station and subsidized a weekly air service. Gold milling began in Geita in December 1938.

In the early 1950s Geita employed about 2,000 men and produced more than half of the gold mined in Tanganyika, although this was much less than the peak production before World War II (1939–1945). Geita struggled with financial problems until it closed in 1965, and seems to have been a net liability to TCL. The mine produced over 1 million ounces of gold between 1936 and 1966. As of 2021 it was owned and operated by AngloGold Ashanti.

=== Nile Congo Divide Syndicate ===
The Nile Congo Divide Syndicate prospected for gold and tin in the Anglo-Egyptian Sudan and Uganda. The syndicate explored the Hofrat en Nafas Copper Mine in southern Darfur between 1918 and 1922, sinking shafts and boreholes, but eventually abandoned the effort. When the Kilo-Moto gold mines opened in the northeast Congo in 1920 the Nile Congo Divide Syndicate was among the prospecting companies that rushed to the region. They failed to find worthwhile gold deposits, but did find low-grade copper in the Manya area of West Madi County, Uganda.

=== Zambesia Exploring Company ===
Robert Williams and Cecil Rhodes founded the Zambesia Exploring Company (ZEC) in 1891 to explore and extract mineral deposits in Southern Rhodesia. The ZEC followed the guidance of Rhodes, and did nothing without his approval. In 1895 it was reported that the Zambasia Exploring Company had placed a large number of shares in United Rhodesia Goldfields in Paris. The ZEC was a subsidiary of TCL in 1922. The ZEC and TCL recruited thousands of workers from the northeast of Northern Rhodesia to work for the UMHK between 1917 and 1922.

== Sources ==
- Abbeloos, Jan-Frederik (2008), Belgium's Expansionist History between 1870 and 1930: Imperialism and the Globalisation of Belgian Business (PDF), Ghent University, hdl:1854/LU-436257
- Annual Review, Mining Journal., 1959
- Ball, Peter (11 January 2015), "Benguela - More than just a current", The Heritage Portal, archived from the original on 24 September 2015
- BCK - KDL - Le site des chemins de fer du Katanga, 2010, archived from the original on 2010-12-04
- "Billions lost as colonialists ferry minerals out of Uganda", Daily Monitor (Uganda), 31 January 2015
- Bryceson, Deborah Fahy; Fisher, Eleanor; Jønsson, Jesper Bosse; Mwaipopo, Rosemarie (2013-10-15), Mining and Social Transformation in Africa: Mineralizing and Democratizing Trends in Artisanal Production, Routledge, ISBN 978-1-135-05198-3
- Clarence-Smith, W.G. (1985). The Third Portuguese Empire, 1825–1975: A Study in Economic Imperialism. Manchester University Press.
- "Compagnie du Congo pour le Commerce et l'Industrie. CCCI", Africa Museum (in French)
- "Comité spécial du Katanga. CSK", Africa Museum
- Cripps, S. (27 April 1950), "Tanganyika Concessions, Ltd(Shares Sale)", Hansard, vol. 474
- Dietz, Sarah (2020-12-30), Entrepreneurship in the Age of Empire: Colonialism, Collaboration and Exploitation, Taylor & Francis, ISBN 978-1-00-029961-8
- GB Colonial Office (1937), Tanganyika Under United Kingdom Administration: Report by Her Majesty's Government in the United Kingdom of Great Britain and Northern Ireland to the General Assembly of the United Nations, H.M. Stationery Office
- "Geita Mine", Mindat
- Hanlon, Joseph (1986), Beggar Your Neighbours: Apartheid Power in Southern Africa, Indiana University Press, p. 168
- Heywood, Linda M. (April 1987), "The Growth and Decline of African Agriculture in Central Angola, 1890-1950", Journal of Southern African Studies, 13 (3), Taylor & Francis, Ltd.: 355–371, doi:10.1080/03057078708708150, JSTOR 2636387
- Higginson, John (1989), A Working Class in the Making: Belgian Colonial Labor Policy, Private Enterprise, and the African Mineworker, 1907-1951, Univ of Wisconsin Press, ISBN 978-0-299-12070-2
- Kovar, Robert (1967), "La congolisation de l'Union minière du Haut-Katanga", Annuaire français de droit international (in French) (13): 747–748
- "Mining Market", The Statist: A Journal of Practical Finance and Trade, Published at "The Statist" Office, 1895
- Noble, Kenneth (13 November 1989), "Railroad in Angola to Be Revived", The New York Times
- Oliver, Roland; Sanderson, G.N., eds. (1975), The Cambridge History of Africa, Cambridge University Press, ISBN 978-0-521-22803-9
- Paul Charles Cuthbert Cayley, NMRS Northern Mine Research Society
- Radmann, Wolf (October–December 1978), "The Nationalization of Zaire's Copper: From Union Minière to Gecamines", Africa Today, 25 (4, Development for Whom?), Indiana University Press: 25–47, JSTOR 4185805
- Roberts, A. D. (October 1986), "The Gold Boom of the 1930s in Eastern Africa", African Affairs, 85 (341), Oxford University Press on behalf of The Royal African Society: 545–562, doi:10.1093/oxfordjournals.afraf.a097817, JSTOR 722296
- Särkkä, T. (2016), "The Lure of Katanga Copper : Tanganyika Concessions Limited and the Anatomy of Mining and Mine Exploration 1899–1906.", South African Historical Journal, 68 (3): 318–341, doi:10.1080/02582473.2016.1153707, S2CID 148541558
- Schilderman, Theo (December 2017), "Minerals of the Congo" (PDF), Les Congolâtres (31): 5–88
- Tanks Group Archive, John Rylands Research Institute and Library
- "The Game of Speculation", The Quarterly Review, 197: 88–114, January 1903
- US Bureau of Mines (1961), Mineral Trade Notes, U.S. Department of the Interior, Bureau of Mines.
- Wilson, Eric, ed. (2016), The Dual State: Parapolitics, Carl Schmitt, and the National Security Complex, Routledge, ISBN 9781317035220
