= Tshilongo =

- Location within Democratic Republic of the Congo

Location
- Country: Democratic Republic of the Congo

Physical characteristics
- Source
  - coordinates: 10°32′29″S 26°02′09″E
- Mouth: Kando River
  - coordinates: 10°48′40″S 26°02′52″E

Basin features
- River system: Lualaba River

The Tshilongo River (French: Rivière Tshilongo) is a river in the southeast of the Democratic Republic of the Congo.

== Course ==
The watershed of the Tshilongo River, which flows from north to south, is west of the watershed of the Dipeta and Mofia rivers. The Tshilongo River originates just south of the village of Tshilongo and flows south-east to Tenke. Along this stretch the RP615 provincial highway and the Lubudi–Tenke railway run parallel to the river. The Tshilongo River then runs south from Tenke to join the Kando River. The Kando flows west to join the Lualaba River near Kolwezi.

A new plant species, Streptocarpus malachiticola, was found along the Tshilongo in the rocks bordering the right bank near Kabwe village in 1980.

== History ==
The Compagnie de Chemin de fer du Katanga opened the 114.3 kilometres (71.0 mi) section of the Lubumbashi – Bukama line that ran from Kamatanda Junction to Tenke and the Tshilongo River on 15 July 1914. The 89.4 kilometres (55.6 mi) section from the Tshilongo River to Lubudi opened on 1 April 1918. The Benguela Railway ran 837 miles (1,347 km) through Portuguese West Africa (Angola) from Lobito Bay on the Atlantic to the border of Katanga province in the Belgian Congo. It opened to the border on 10 June 1929. The next step was construction of the 335 miles (539 km) section from the frontier to the Tshilongo at Tenke. The Dilolo–Tenke line opened on 26 April 1931.

During Operation Grandslam, where United Nations peacekeeping forces attacked the secessionist State of Katanga, on 17 January 1963 forward elements of the 99th Brigade reached the Tshilongo River where they were ordered to halt. That afternoon Moïse Tshombe formally surrendered.

== Sources ==
- Avenent 2014 de l'évaluations des impacts environnementaux er sociaux (PDF) (in French), Tenke Fungurume Mining, July 2014
- "Editorial Notes", Journal of the Royal African Society, 28 (112), Oxford University Press on behalf of The Royal African Society: 405–412, July 1929, JSTOR 717303
- Fischer, Eberhard; Darbyshire, Iain (24 June 2021), "Five new species of Streptocarpus (Gesneriaceae) from Katanga, D.R. Congo", Plant Ecology and Evolution, 154 (2), Royal Botanical Society of Belgium and the Botanic Garden Meise: 264–280, doi:10.5091/plecevo.2021.1824, JSTOR 27029816, S2CID 237856662
- Golder Associates (March 2007), Environmental Impact Assessment Tenke Fungurume Project (PDF), vol. E
- Praval, K. C. (2012), Indian Army After Independence, Lancer Publishers, ISBN 9781935501619
