= Jean Bosco Mwenda =

Congolese musician (1930 –1990)

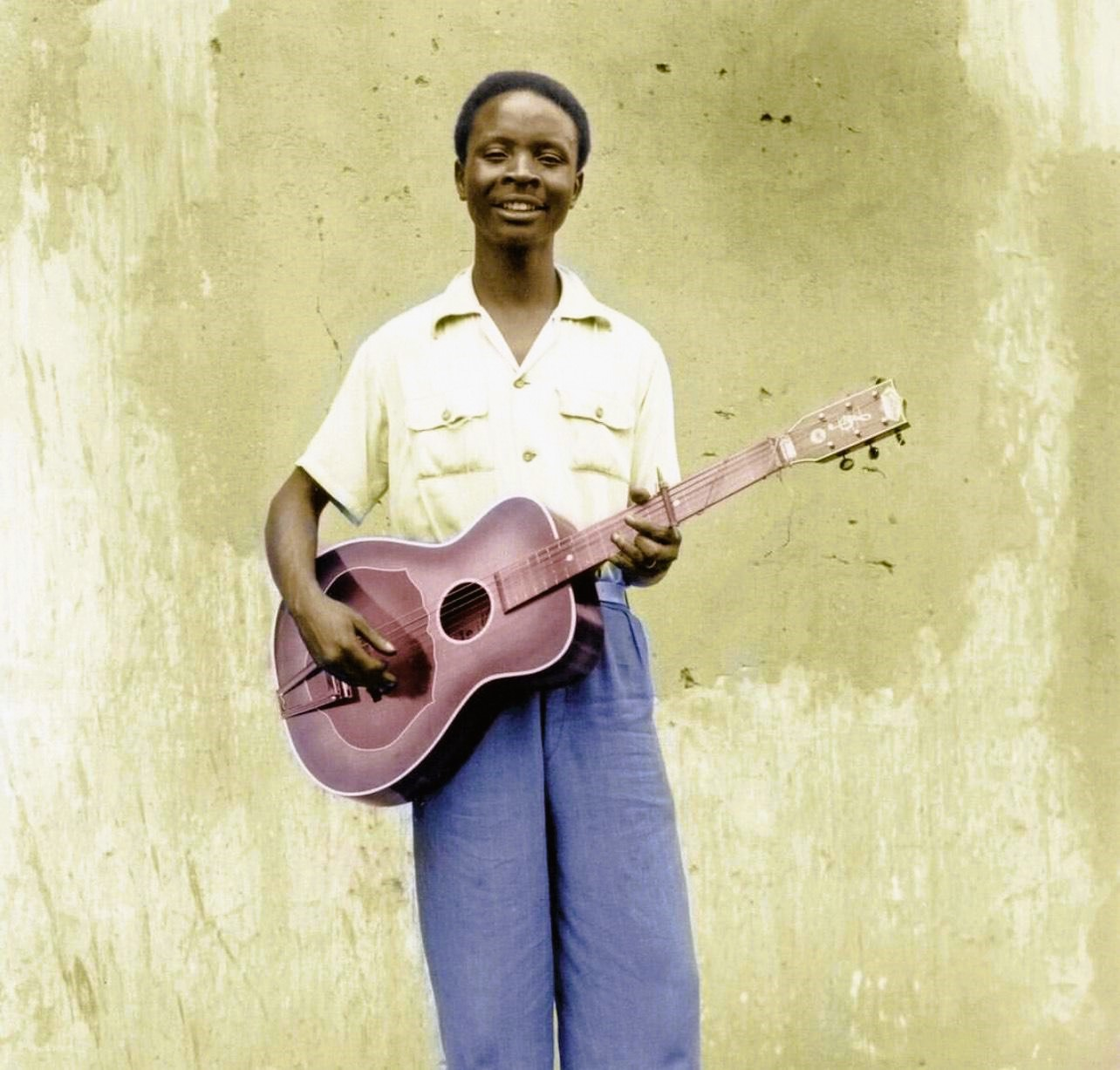
- Jean-Bosco Mwenda performing in Katanga, Belgian Congo, in 1952

Background information
- Also known as: Mwenda wa Bayeke
- Born: Jean-Bosco Mwenda c. 1930; Bunkeya, Belgian Congo (modern-day Democratic Republic of the Congo)
- Died: September 1990 (aged 59-60) Zambia
- Genre: Congolese rumba
- Occupations: Singer; guitarist; songwriter
- Instruments: Guitar vocals
- Years active: 1950s–1990

Jean-Bosco Mwenda (Note: also known as Mwenda wa Bayeke) (c. 1930 – September 1990) was a Congolese guitarist and musician, and pioneer of Congolese fingerstyle acoustic guitar music. He was popular in the Congo as well as other African countries, particularly in East Africa, and in the late 1950s and early 1960s was briefly based in Nairobi, Kenya, where he had a regular radio show and became a profound influence on a generation of Kenyan guitarists.

== Background ==
Jean-Bosco Mwenda was born in 1930 at Bunkeya (now part of Lualaba Province) in what was then the Belgian Congo, but lived most of his life in Lubumbashi, where in addition to playing music he had a job in a bank and with the local mining company, managed other bands, and owned a hotel on the Zambian border. He died in September 1990 in a car accident in Zambia.

Mwenda used the name Mwenda wa Bayeke, claiming descent from the Sanga noble clan of Bayeke. His music draws on various sources including the traditional music of his Luba/Sanga people. He was one of the few Congolese to obtain a Western education during the colonial era due to his father's position in the Catholic Church. Mwenda worked at first as a clerk for the Likasi administration but soon achieved huge success as a guitarist, issuing his first recordings in 1952.

Along with his friend and sometime partner Losta Abelo, and his cousin Edouard Masengo, Bosco defined the Congolese acoustic guitar style. His song "Masanga", recorded by Hugh Tracey, became particularly influential, because of its complex and varied guitar part. His own influences included traditional music of Zambia and the Eastern Congo, Cuban groups such as the Trio Matamoros, and cowboy movies.

A 1982 video field recording by Gerhard Kubik exists in a compilation of influential African guitarists artists entitled Native African Guitar. A 1982 CD with booklet (text by Gerhard Kubik, also in English, including the Kiswahili song texts), is available from the Museum für Völkerkunde, Berlin. The recordings include the complete concert Bosco gave at June 30, 1982, at the Museum für Völkerkunde, Berlin. In 1988 Cape Town-based record label Mountain Records recorded a studio album of Mwenda's music and issued it in 1994. The album is entitled Mwenda wa Bayeke - African guitar legend.

== See also ==
- African fingerstyle guitar
- African music
