= Kamatanda Airport =

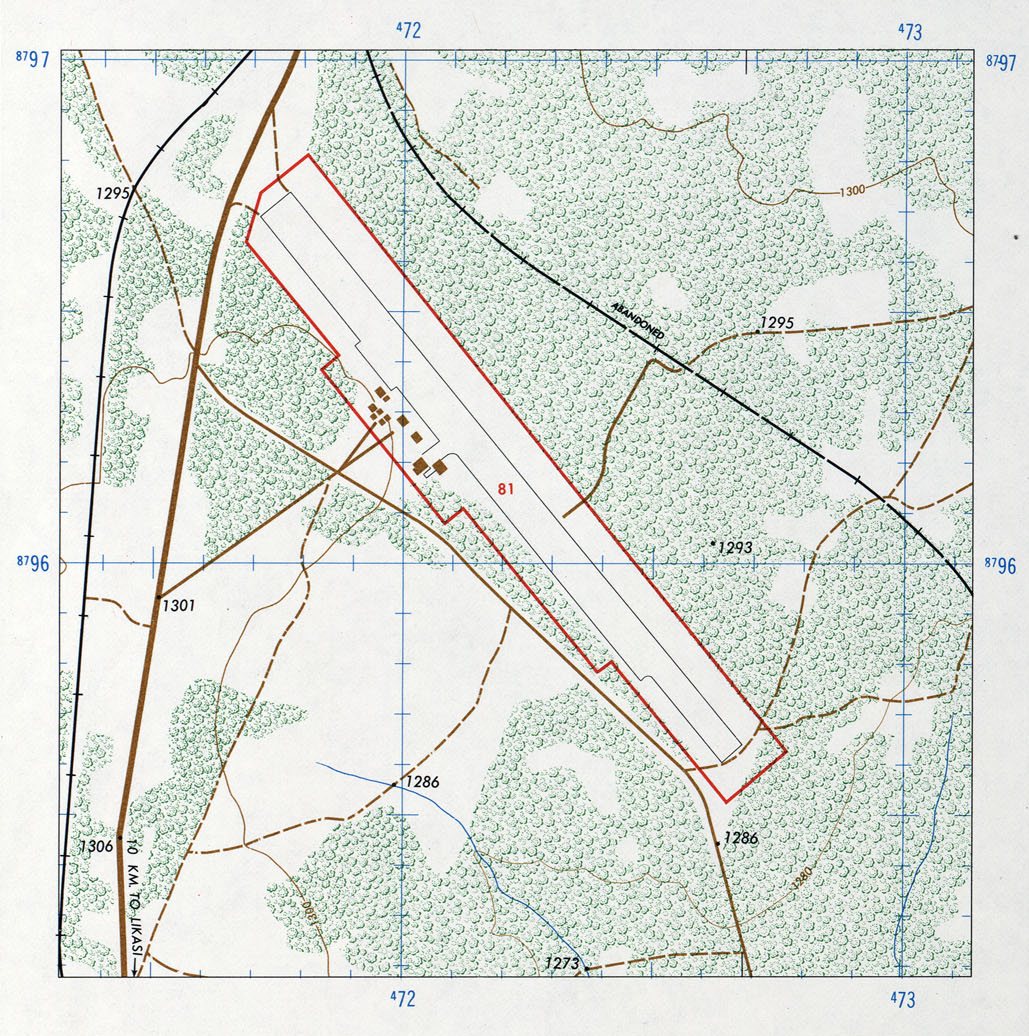
- Map of the airport in 1980
- IATA: none; ICAO: FZQI

Summary
- Airport type: Closed
- Serves: Likasi
- Elevation AMSL: 4,261 ft / 1,299 m
- Coordinates: 10°53′30″S 26°44′40″E

Map
- Location of the airport in Democratic Republic of the Congo

Runways
Direction	Length		Surface
Direction	ft	m	Surface
Closed
- Sources: Google Maps

Kamatanda Airport (ICAO: FZQI) is an abandoned airport near the town of Likasi in Democratic Republic of the Congo. It used to serve the Kamatanda mining area.

== See also ==
- Transport in the Democratic Republic of the Congo
- List of airports in the Democratic Republic of the Congo
