= Sanga people =

Regions with significant populations
- Katanga Province, Democratic Republic of the Congo: 431,000 (1991)

Languages
- Sanga language

The Sanga people (also Luba-Garenganze, Luba-Sanga or Southern Luba) are an ethnic group that lives mostly in the Katanga Province of the Democratic Republic of the Congo.

The missionary Frederick Stanley Arnot relates that a copper trader named Kalasa became a close friend of the old chief of Sanga. At one point Kalasa's son Msidi (Msiri) visited the Sanga country instead of his father, where he found the people at war with the Baluba people, who were invading from the north. Msiri's party had four guns, unknown weapons in the area at that time, and a few shots from the guns put the Baluba to flight. The old chief was grateful, gave Msiri increasing power, end eventually made him his successor. Mziri founded the state of Geranganze with its capital at Bunkeya and took the title of king in 1870. Shortly after this the Sanga people revolted against Msiri's rule, led by their chief Mpande.

In the 1890s the Sanga put up a strong resistance to the colonial Force Publique of King Leopold II of Belgium. In one notorious incident, rebels led by a chief called Mulume Niama killed a Belgian officer. The rebels were pursued by Congo Free State troops and trapped in a large chalk cave. When they refused to surrender, despite attempts to smoke them out, the cave was blocked up. Three months later, troops entered the cave and found 178 bodies. The soldiers triggered landslides to cover the cave and destroy all evidence of what could come to be seen as a martyrdom.

In the 1950s many of the Sanga people obtained work in the mines of the Katanga copperbelt.

Mwenda Jean Bosco was the leading guitarist in Congo in the 1950s. His other name is Mwenda wa Bayeke, based on a claim of descent from the Sanga noble clan of Bayeke. His music draws on various sources including the traditional music of his Luba/Sanga people. In 1991 the estimated population of Sanga people was about 431,000, scattered through the Lubudi, Mitwaba, and Pweto territories. The Tumbwe people, a small group of about 100,000 people whose homeland is in the Kalemie Territory on the west shore of Lake Tanganyika, take their name from a hereditary chief of the Sanga people.

== Sources ==
- Arnot, Frederick Stanley (1969). Garenganze: or, Seven years' pioneer mission work in central Africa. Routledge. ISBN 0-7146-1860-8.
- Kisangani, Emizet F.; Bobb, F. Scott (2010). Historical Dictionary of the Democratic Republic of the Congo. Scarecrow Press. ISBN 978-0-8108-5761-2.
- Kubik, Gerhard (2010). Theory of African Music. Vol. 1. University of Chicago Press. ISBN 978-0-226-45691-1.
- Ngondji, Fungula Fumu (2011). The Kongo of My Ancestors: In the Memory of Tata Kimbangu and Patrice Lumumba. Tate Publishing. ISBN 978-1-61739-916-9.
- "Sanga - A language of Democratic Republic of the Congo". Ethnologue.
- Vail, Leroy (1989). "The Creation of Tribalism in Southern Africa". London Berkeley: Currey University of California Press.
