= Kikula =

Commune in the city of Likasi, Democratic Republic of the Congo

- Commune
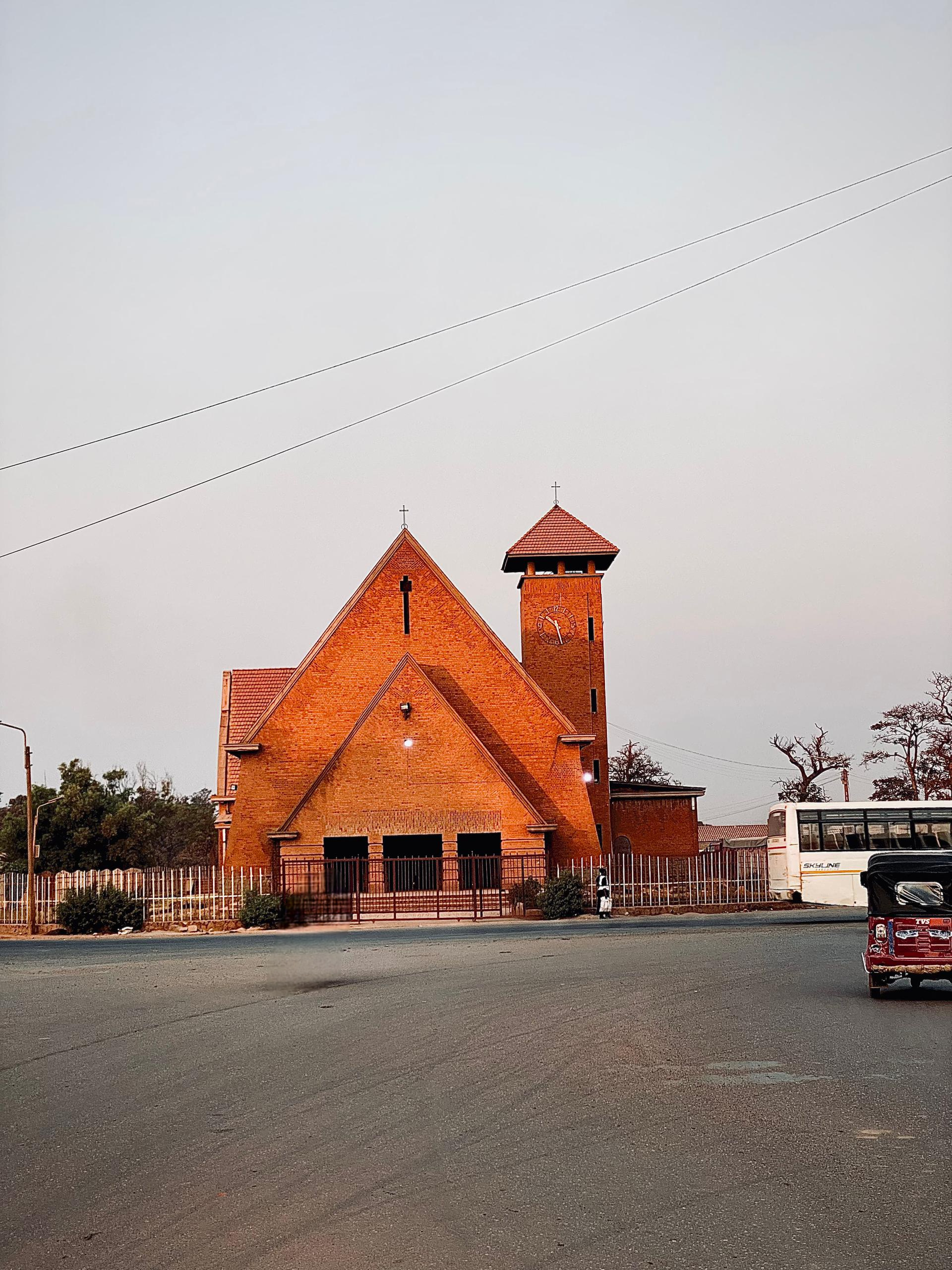
- A Catholic church in Kikula

- Location within Democratic Republic of the Congo
- Coordinates: 10°58′25″S 26°43′11″E
- Country: Democratic Republic of the Congo
- Province: Haut Katanga
- City: Likasi

Kikula is a commune of the city of Likasi, which is located in the Haut-Katanga Province of the Democratic Republic of the Congo. It is the most populous commune in Likasi. The commune contains a health center.
