= Comité Spécial du Katanga =

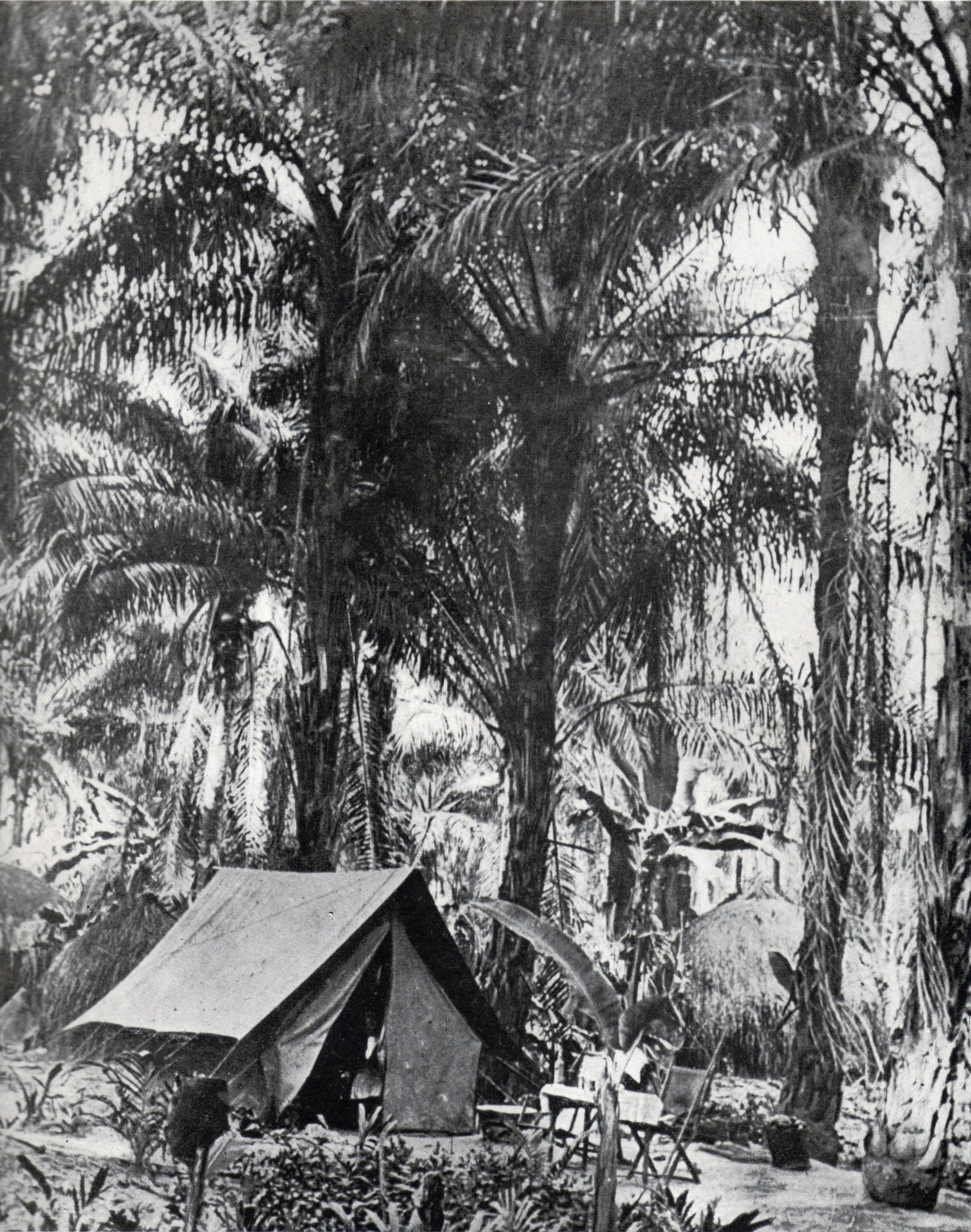
- Camp of Commandant Léon Tonneau, Director of the Comité Spécial du Katanga, in Bukama between 1903 and 1906
- Abbreviation: CSK
- Formation: 1900
- Dissolved: June 1960; 65 years ago
- Type: Parastatal
- Location: Congo Free State

The Special Committee of Katanga (French: Comité Spécial du Katanga, or CSK) was a parastatal body created in 1900 by the Congo Free State and the Compagnie du Katanga. At first it was responsible for administering the huge Katanga Province on behalf of the Free State and for exploiting the province's mineral resources. Mineral exploration and mining were soon delegated to separate companies. After the Belgian Congo took over from the Free State in 1908, the CSK handed over its administrative powers to the provincial government. However, as a parastatal it remained responsible for many aspects of development in Katanga until independence in 1960, when it was dissolved.

== Creation (1900) ==
The Compagnie du Katanga was founded in 1891 to explore the southeast of the Congo Free State. Under agreements of March 1891 and May 1896 the company was to occupy and develop Katanga, and in return gained full ownership of 1/3 of the land in Katanga Province and a 99-year license to exploit the minerals in the granted land. Given the difficulty of determining the land boundaries, in 1900 the Compagnie du Katanga and the Congo Free State created the Comité Spécial du Katanga (CSK) to manage all the territory, with profits shared between the Compagnie du Katanga (1/3) and the Free State (2/3). The Congo Free State and the Compagnie du Katanga entrusted the CSK with their shared land and mineral rights, and authorized the CSK with managing this property.

The CSK was created with a 99-year term. It was given economic and administrative rights over a territory of 450,000 square kilometres (170,000 sq mi). A decree of 6 December 1900 delegated the authority of the state to the CSK in Katanga. The CSK was given all the mines in Katanga, which it could manage directly or subcontract to concessionary companies. The CSK had complete powers of administration, management and alienation over the territory.

== Early years (1900–1910) ==
In 1900-1901 the CSK signed an agreement with the entrepreneur Robert Williams and the British Tanganyika Concessions (TCL). TCL was authorized to prospect for minerals in Katanga for five years, and to exploit the mines that were found with CSK for 30 years. The term was eventually extended to 89 years.

The CSK created the Compagnie de Chemin de fer du Katanga (CFK) in 1902. It had a capital of 1,000,000 francs. The Congo Free State held 2,400 shares and Robert Williams held 1,600 shares. The CFK was to build rail links to the region where the city of Elisabethville (Lubumbashi) would be founded. One line would connect to the Rhodesian railways at Sakania, while another would connect to the port of Bukama on the Lualaba River.

Under the direction of Jean Jadot of the Société Générale de Belgique, this bank participated in setting up three mining-related companies in the Congo Free State: the Union Minière du Haut-Katanga (UMHK), the Société Internationale Forestière et Minière du Congo (Forminière) and the Compagnie du Chemin de Fer du Bas-Congo au Katanga (BCK).

The UMHK was founded in 1906 to develop mines in Katanga. It was also to participate in building a railway to carry material and equipment to the mines and to take away the extracted minerals. The UMHK came from a compromise between the Free State and the Compagnie de Katanga as owners through the CSK, the TCL who had found the mines, and the TCL and Société Générale de Belgique who would fund their exploitation. UMHK was founded as a joint venture between the Compagnie du Katanga, the CSK and TCL. The Compagnie du Katanga was in turn a subsidiary of the Compagnie du Congo pour le Commerce et l'Industrie (CCCI), which was controlled by the Société Générale de Belgique.

The BCK was founded on 31 October 1906 by the CSK', the Congo Free State and the Société Générale de Belgique to build a rail link from Bukama in Katanga to Port Franqui on the Kasai River, from where mining products could be shipped down to Léopoldville. Jadot was made managing director of the BCK.

With the creation of the UMHK the CSK was no longer directly involved in mining. It was also released from having to administer the territory, and became mainly concerned with asset management. Émile Wangermée was made representative of the CSK, effectively governor of Katanga, in 1906. Later he became representative in Kafubu. In 1910 he became governor of Katanga, holding office until 1917.

== State agency (1910–1960) ==
Belgium took over the Congo Free State in 1908. In 1910 the state powers granted to the CSK were revoked, and local powers were handed over to the provincial governors. Many of the CSK employees and leaders joined the colonial service. After World War I (1914–1918) the CSK provided support of demography, geology, forestry, agriculture, colonization, veterinary medicine and experimental farming. From 1933 the CSK promoted all activities associated with colonization of Katanga, as well as agriculture, commerce and mining. The CSK was the main shareholder of the UMHK (1906), Compagnie Géologique et Minière des Ingénieurs et Industriels belges (GEOMINES, 1910) and the livestock company Compagnie Pastorale du Lomani (1928).

The CSK was dissolved in June 1960 when the Democratic Republic of the Congo became independent.

== Sources ==
- Abbeloos, Jan-Frederik (2008), Belgium's Expansionist History between 1870 and 1930: Imperialism and the Globalisation of Belgian Business (PDF), Ghent University
- BCK - KDL - Le site des chemins de fer du Katanga, 2010, archived from the original on 2010-12-04
- "Compagnie du Congo pour le Commerce et l'Industrie. CCCI", Africa Museum (in French)
- "Comité spécial du Katanga. CSK", Africa Museum
- Oliver, Roland; Sanderson, G.N., eds. (1975), The Cambridge History of Africa, Cambridge University Press, ISBN 978-0-521-22803-9
- "Wangermée, Émile", Africa Museum
