= Compagnie du Katanga =

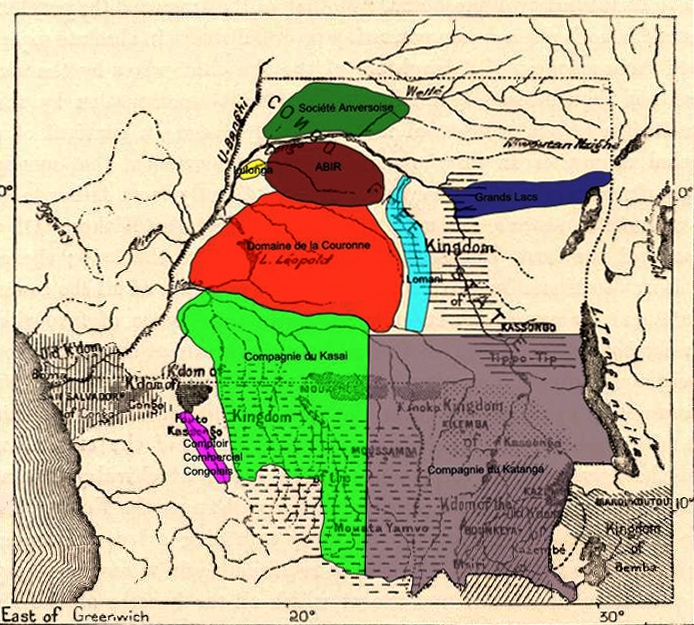
Congo Free State concession companies, Compagnie du Katanga shown in grey

The Compagnie du Katanga was a concession company of the Congo Free State that engaged in mining in the Katanga Province.

== History ==
The company was founded by Leopold II in 1891 to occupy part of the Free State in order to dissuade a British claim on the land. It was formed by the Compagnie du Congo pour le Commerce et l'Industrie (CCCI) and a group of English investors. The company received 99-year mineral exploitation right on one third of the land and preferential rights for twenty years on the remainder. The company explored the area and found rich deposits of copper.

In 1899 the company and the Free State government formed the Comité Special du Katanga (CSK) to administer the whole province, with its own police force. In many ways the CSK was independent of the administration at Boma and reported directly Brussels. The CSK hired Robert Williams of Tanganyika Concessions (TCL) to prospect for minerals. In 1906 the Compagnie du Katanga, the CSK and the TCL formed the mining company Union Minière du Haut-Katanga (UMHK).

== Bibliography ==
- "Compagnie du Congo pour le Commerce et l'Industrie. CCCI", Africa Museum (in French)
- Fage, JD; Oliver, Roland Anthony; Sanderson, GN (1985), The Cambridge history of Africa, Volume 6, Cambridge University Press, ISBN 9780521228039
- Harms, Robert (1975), "The End of Red Rubber: A Reassessment", The Journal of African History, 16 (1): 73–88, doi:10.1017/S0021853700014110, JSTOR 181099
