= Union Minière du Haut-Katanga =

Belgian mining company

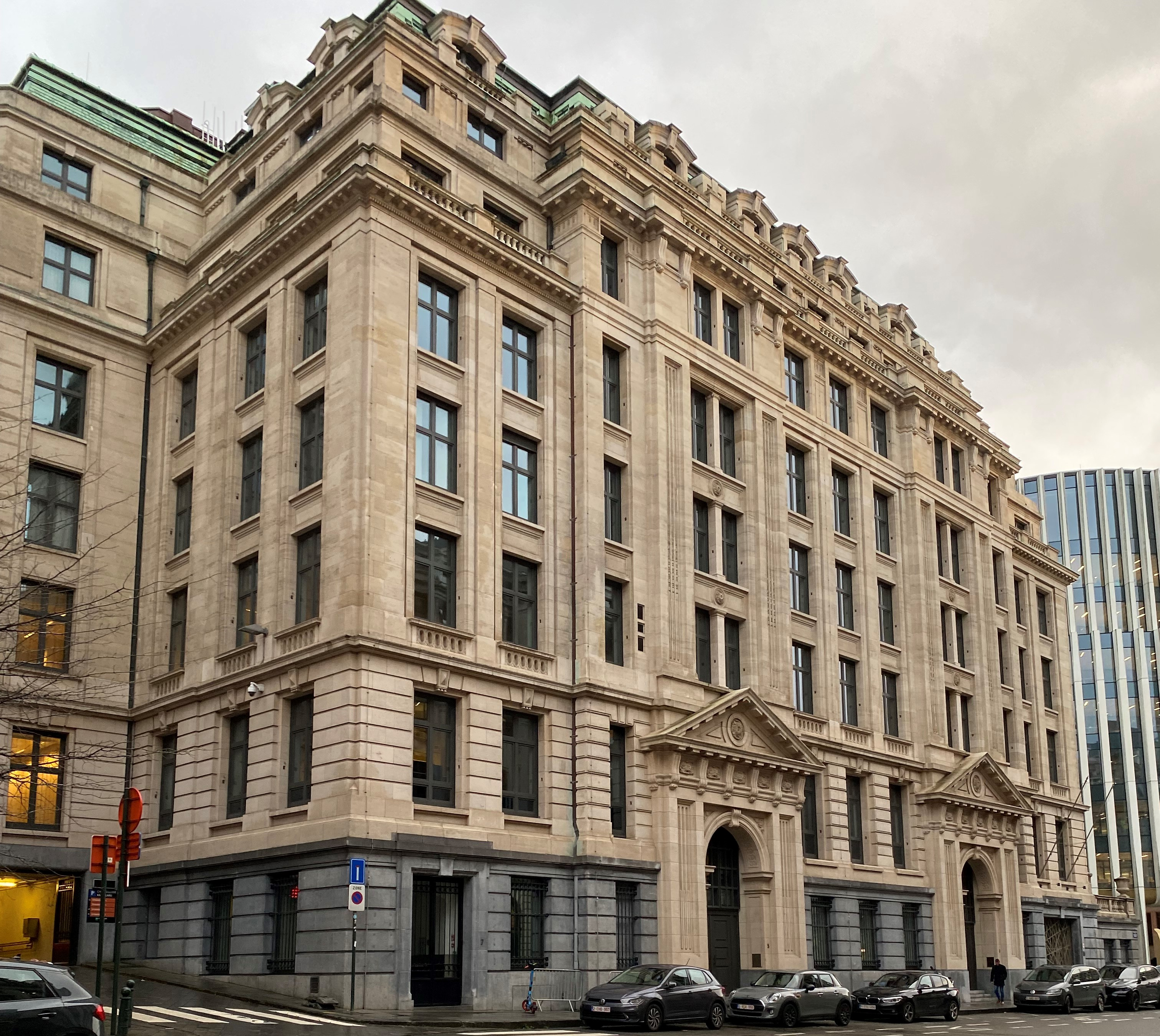
Former head office in Brussels from 1931 to 1994

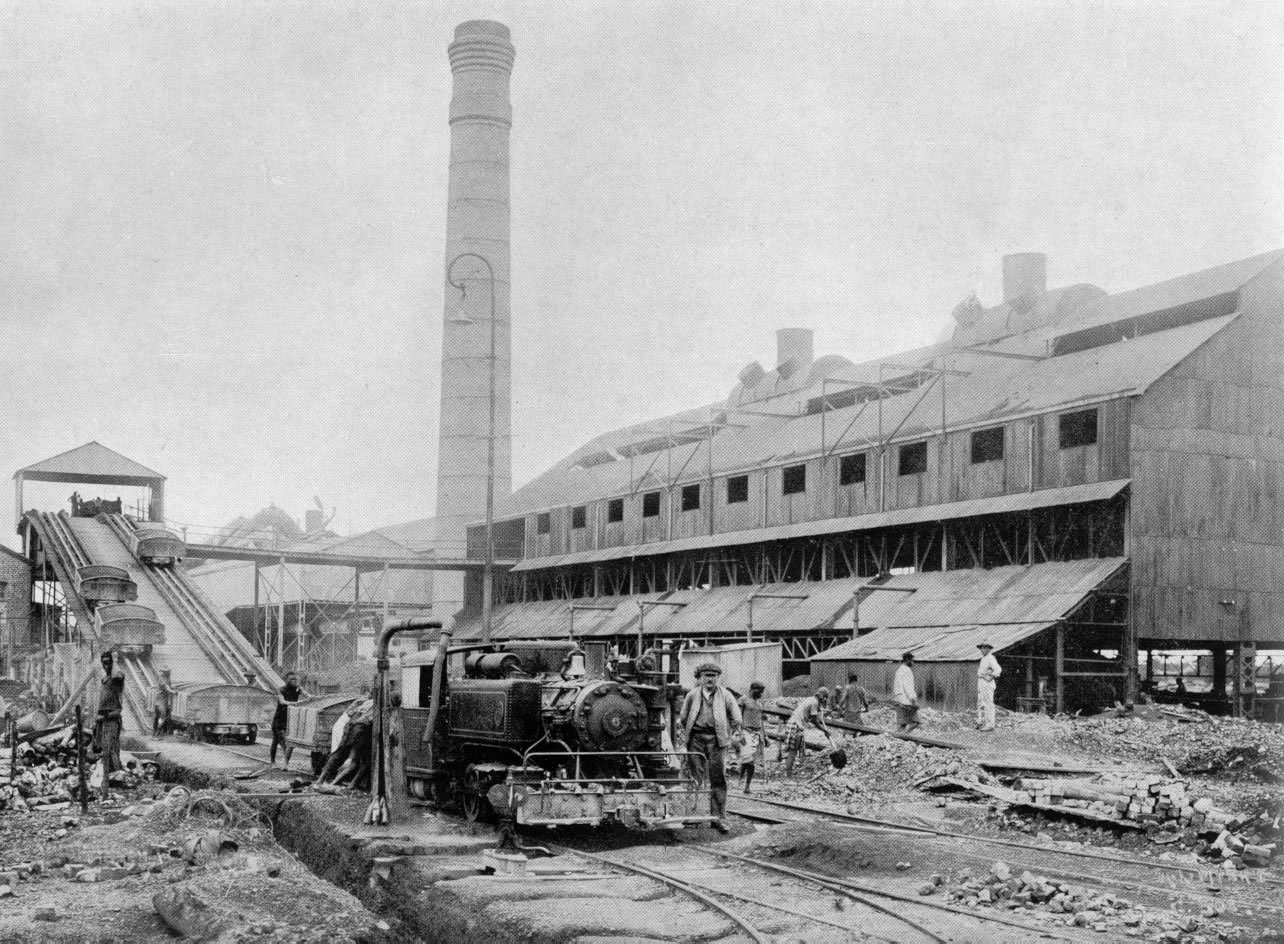
UMHK ore processing in Élisabethville (modern-day Lubumbashi) in 1917

Union Minière du Haut-Katanga (UMHK, lit. 'Mining Union of Upper Katanga') was a mining company active in Belgian Congo and especially its Katanga Province. It controlled and operated the mining industry in the copperbelt region, now part of the Democratic Republic of the Congo, between 1906 and 1966.

Created in 1906, the UMHK was founded as a joint venture of the Belgian Compagnie du Katanga, the Belgian Comité Spécial du Katanga and Tanganyika Concessions Limited (TCL, also known as "Tanks"). The Compagnie du Katanga in turn was a subsidiary of the Compagnie du Congo pour le Commerce et l'Industrie (CCCI). With the support of the colonial state, the company was allocated a 7,700 square miles (20,000 km^{2}) concession in Katanga.

Its primary product was copper, but it also produced tin, cobalt, radium, uranium, zinc, cadmium, germanium, manganese, silver, and gold. UMHK was part of a powerful group of global copper producers. By the start of World War II, the Société Générale de Belgique, which controlled about 70 percent of the Congolese economy, exercized preponderant influence over the Comité spécial and effectively controlled the UMHK.

In 1968, following nationalization of its Congolese mining operations two years earlier, the UMHK reorganized and rebranded itself as Union Minière (UM). UM in 1989 absorbed other entities and in 2001 renamed itself Umicore.

== Colonial era ==
=== Copper ===
Cheap copper has no terrors for the great Mid-African mines of the Union Minière du Haut Katanga, world's biggest producer... Elements in Katanga's strength are: tremendously rich ores; cheap native labor; big production of cobalt and radium (over 82%, of world radium supply) on the side; and, most recent, the newly opened Benguela Railway, which connects Katanga with the Atlantic, saves hundreds of rail miles, thousands of nautical miles for Katanga copper on its long journey to European markets.

Copper's Travail, 10 August 1931, Time

During its years of operation, the UMHK greatly contributed to the wealth of Belgium, and, to a lesser extent, Katanga—which developed more than the surrounding regions without similar mineral resources. The company could be considered harshly capitalistic, but its motto at the time, best expressing their opinion of development was "good health, good spirits, and high productivity." Possibly it was because of this approach, and in order to keep and placate the workforce, that the Union introduced an accident compensation scheme as early as 1928. Katanga's mineral wealth led to the construction of railways (including the Benguela railway) to connect it with the Angolan coast which took place in 1911, other rail lines connected Katanga to Northern Rhodesia. Thereafter, mineral production, especially of copper, took off. For instance, in 1911, the Ruashi Mine, owned by the UMHK, began operation, supplying 997 tonnes of copper on its first year. By 1919, annual production had risen to 22,000 tonnes, produced by seven furnaces. In 1935, the Union was party to the World Copper Agreement. One of its prominent figure were Belgian financier and lawyer Felicien Cattier and businessman Emile Francqui. In the 1950s, Congo was the world's fourth largest copper-producing country.

=== Other metals ===
In addition to the copper for which it is known, Katanga was also rich in other minerals. The company controlled the exports of cobalt (the UMHK was responsible for 75 percent of world production during the 1950s), tin, uranium and zinc in its mines, among the richest in the world. Henri Buttgenbach, a Belgian metallurgist and board member of UMHK from 1911, described cornetite, fourmarierite, cuprosklodowskite and thoreaulite. The finding of radium deposits in Katanga at the same time eventually led to a Belgian radium-extracting industry. In July 1919, UMHK formed the Société Générale Métallurgique d'Hoboken (SGMH) to refine non-ferrous metals, named after the district of Hoboken, Antwerp, where Metallgesellschaft had initially established a plant in 1887. SGMH built a separate facility at Olen that was the first to produce Radium on an industrial basis, based on the findings of Marie Curie. In 1923, the UMHK also established a separate entity named Le Radium Belge to commercialize the production of the Olen plant, initially as a joint venture with the Radium Company of Colorado (RCC), in which UMHK had 60 percent of equity and RCC 40 percent. RCC, however, ceased operations in 1924. Le Radium Belge, led by Gustave Lechien, remained a stand-alone company for some time, but by early 1929 it had been converted into a mere department of UMHK.

Johannes F. Vaes, who studied minerals coming from the UMHK, is responsible for the discovery of billietite, masuyite, renierite, richetite, schuilingite-(Nd), sengierite, studtite and vandendriesscheite. Gaston Briart, after whom Briartite is named, was a UMHK consultant.

=== Uranium ===
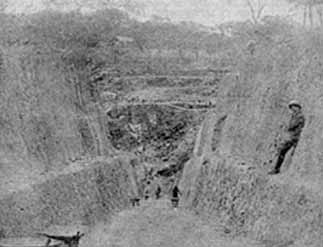
Shinkolobwe mine

In 1922, the UMHK built its first refinery for uranium ore, and by 1926 had a virtual monopoly of the world uranium market (holding most of the deposits known at the time), to be broken only by the German invasion of 1940. This uranium was mostly refined at Olen by the UMHK-controlled Société Générale Métallurgique de Hoboken. In 1939, Frédéric Joliot-Curie, head of the French newly established Centre National de la Recherche Scientifique (CNRS), arranged for the UMHK to provide his organization with 5 tonnes of uranium oxide, technical assistance with the construction of a reactor and a million francs, in exchange for having all discoveries made by the CNRS patented by a syndicate, with profits shared between the CNRS and the UMHK. This uranium oxide was transferred to England before German troops entered Paris.

The United States of America obtained uranium for the atomic bomb from the Union Minière. At a meeting on 18 September 1942 between Edgar Sengier, head of UMHK, and United States General Kenneth Nichols of the Manhattan Project, Nichols purchased the 1500 tonnes of uranium (mostly mined at Shinkolobwe mine, near the town of Jadotville) the project required. This was already in the United States, and additional ore was shipped from the Congo. The mine had a "tremendously rich lode of uranium pitchblende. Nothing like it has ever again been found"; the ore was 65% uranium and even the waste piles were 20%; "after the war the MED and the AEC considered ore containing three tenths of 1 percent as a good find". Some 1200 tonnes of uranium stored at the Olen refinery were captured by the Germans in 1940, and only recovered by US troops at the end of the war.

=== Social policy and influence ===
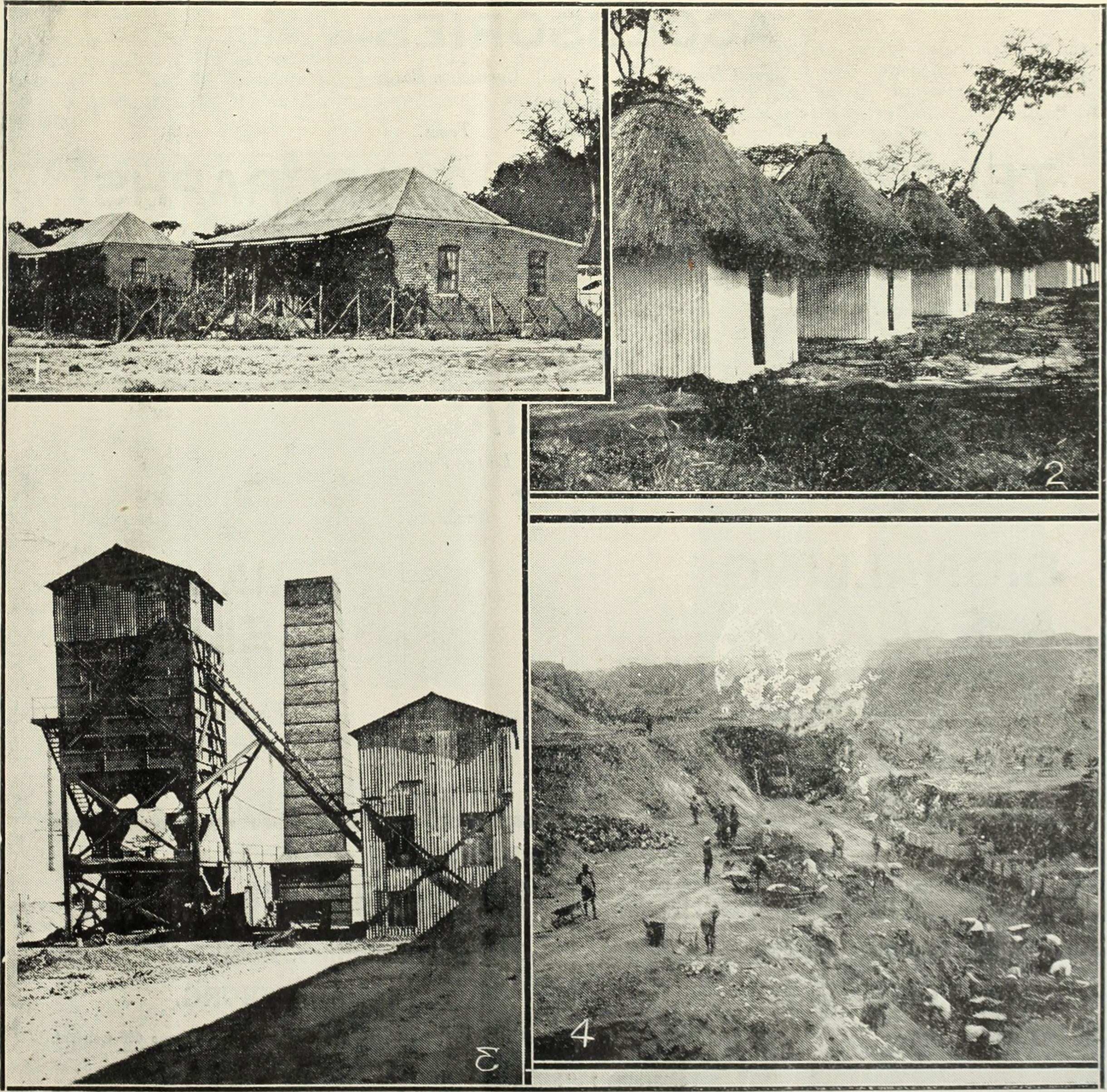
Mining by the Union Minière du Haut Katanga, 1922

During its heyday, the UMHK held quasi governmental power in Katanga, and operated schools, dispensaries, hospitals and sporting establishments, and had enjoyed virtually unlimited funds. In 1959, Belgian profits from the Union Miniere were in excess of 3.5 billion Belgian francs, and export duties paid to the Congolese government constituted 50% of the government's revenue. There were times when the Belgian colony's tax on the UMHK accounted for up to 66% of its revenues. It is reported that in 1960, the UMHK had annual sales of $200 million USD, had produced 60 percent of the uranium in the West, 73 percent of the cobalt, and 10 percent of the copper, and had in the Congo 24 affiliates including hydroelectric plants, chemical factories and railways.

== Congo Crisis ==
The Belgian Congo became independent in June 1960. After a brief period of political unrest, Katanga Province seceded unilaterally from the Congo to form the State of Katanga under Moïse Tshombe. Fearing that the Congo's left-leaning political leaders, especially Patrice Lumumba, would nationalise its holdings, the UMHK supported Tshombe and became a major force within the new state, and still allowed for Belgian and international control. During the province's secession, the Union transferred 1.25 billion Belgian francs (35 million USD) into Tshombe's bank account, an advance on 1960 taxes which should in fact have been paid to Lumumba's government. The Congolese government was a significant minority shareholder of UMHK, as it had inherited the 18-percent stake previously owned by the Belgian colonial government of Congo, but that holding was "held in trust" under Belgian control during the Congo Crisis. In 1963, the secession ended and Katanga was finally reintegrated into the Congo.

Göran Björkdahl (a Swedish aid worker) wrote in 2011 that he believed that the death of the-then United Nations Secretary-General Dag Hammarskjöld was a murder committed in part to benefit mining companies like Union Minière, after Hammarsköld had made the UN intervene in Congo's Katanga crisis after a call for intervention by prime minister Lumumba. Björkdahl based his assertion on interviews with witnesses of the plane crash near the border of the DRC with Zambia, and on archival documents.

== Expropriation from Congo and rebranding as Union Minière ==
On 31 December 1966, the Congolese government, under President Joseph-Désiré Mobutu, took over all possessions and activities of UMHK in Congo, transforming them into Gécamines (Société générale des Carrières et des Mines), a state-owned mining company. In response, UMHK canceled the Congolese state's ownership stake in May 1967, and announced that its future development would be pursued outside Congo. Mismanagement and failure to adopt modern standards of mining (rather than mining depletion), as well as outright theft by Mobutu, meant that Gécamines' mining production was greatly reduced, with production rate sinking as much as 70%.

In 1968, UMHK was reorganized and rebranded as Union Minière. It kept operating under that name until after the 1989 merger that created what in 2001 became known as Umicore.
