= Sir Robert Williams, 1st Baronet, of Park =

British businessman

Sir Robert Williams, 1st Baronet
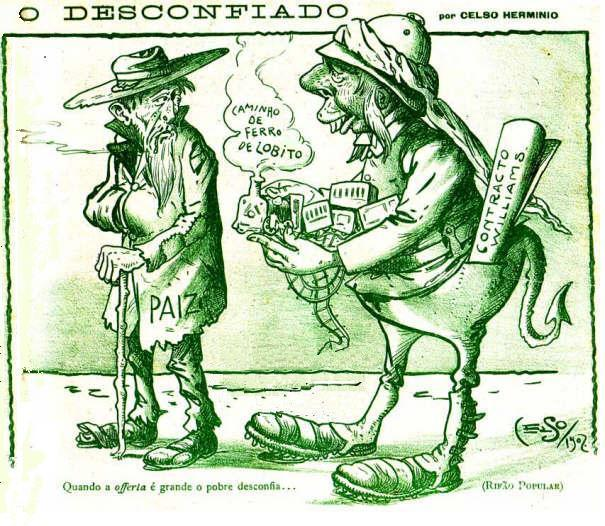
- Caricature by Celso Herminio showing Robert Williams, a contract in his pocket, giving Portugal a railway line in Lobito.
- Born: January 21, 1860; Aberdeen, Scotland
- Died: April 25, 1938 (aged 78)

Sir Robert Williams, 1st Baronet, JP, DL (21 January 1860 – 25 April 1938) was a Scottish mining engineer, pioneering explorer of Africa, entrepreneur, and railroad developer who was chiefly responsible for the discovery of the vast copper deposits in Katanga Province (now incorporated in the Democratic Republic of Congo) and Northern Rhodesia (now Zambia).

== Life ==
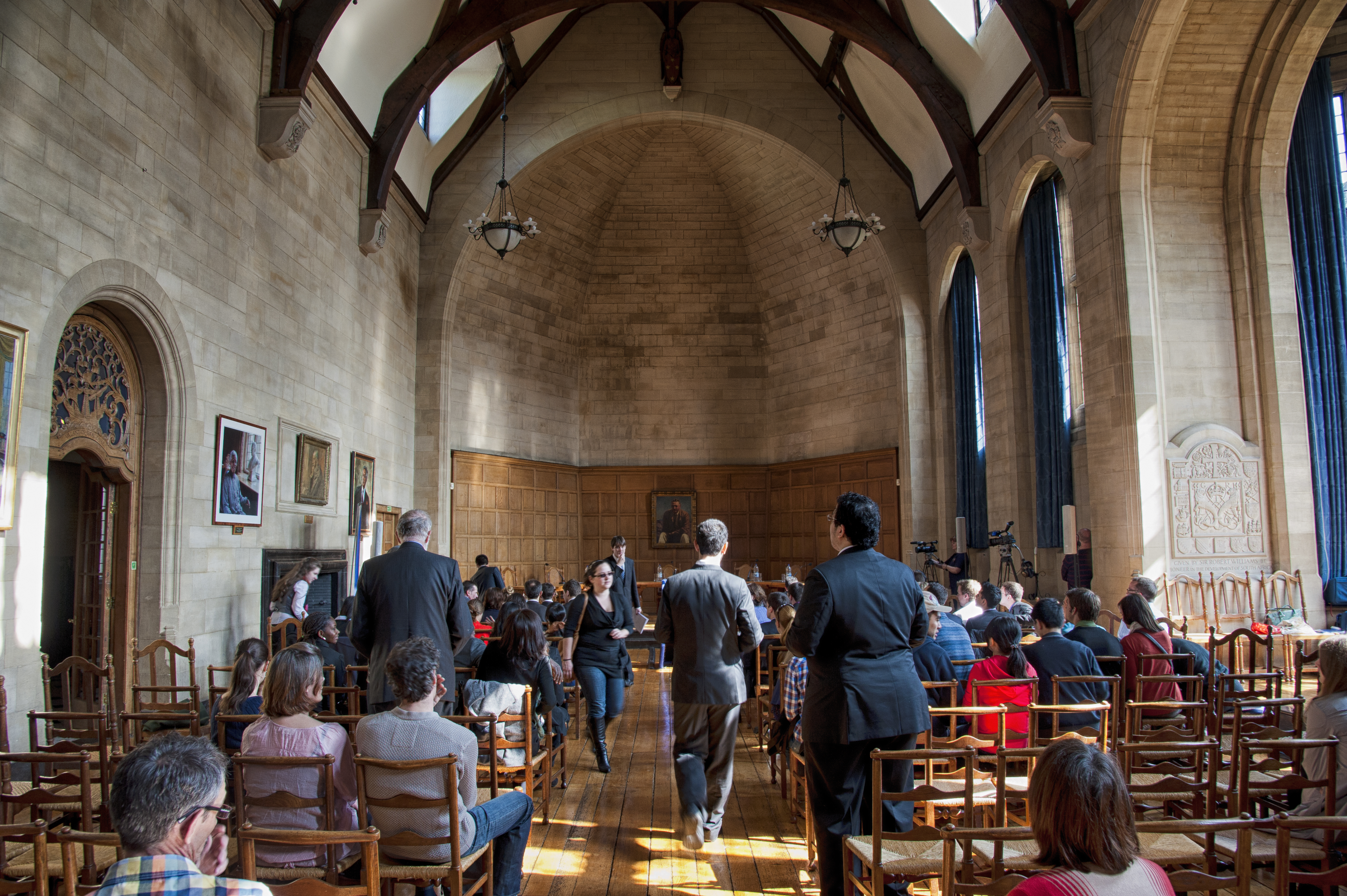
Sir Robert Williams Bt inscription at Rhodes House, Oxford.

Robert Williams was born and educated in Aberdeen.

Williams was closely associated, variously as an employee of, advisor to, and partner with Cecil Rhodes in his many enterprises from the time of their first meeting in 1885 at the De Beers diamond mine in Kimberley until Rhodes's death in 1902. Williams planned and executed the creation of the Benguela railway through then Portuguese West Africa (now Angola). In 1902, Williams took over the construction and completed the connection to Luau at the border to the Belgian Congo in 1929.

Williams was the managing Director of Tanganyika Concessions. founded in 1889. He promoted a market for European goods within southern Africa which was part of a change in trading from barter to currency.

He was vice-president of the Belgian Compagnie de Chemin de fer du Katanga (CFK) when it was founded in 1902.

He was also joint founder, with King Leopold II of Union Minière du Haut-Katanga in 1906.

After World War I he bought Park House, a mansion with several hundred acres of land at Drumoak in Aberdeenshire. He was granted the Freedom of the City of Aberdeen, and was created a baronet in 1928, of Park, Aberdeenshire. He also became a grand officer of the Order of the Crown (Belgium) and commander of the Royal Order of the Lion of Belgium and a knight commander of the Portuguese order of Christ.

== See also ==
- Vila Robert Williams
- Central African Copperbelt

Baronetage of the United Kingdom
New creation	Baronet (of Park); 1928–1938	Extinct
