= Panda, Likasi =

Commune of Likasi, Democratic Republic of the Congo

Panda
- Commune
- Location within Democratic Republic of the Congo
- Coordinates: 11°01′07″S 26°44′07″E
- Country: Democratic Republic of the Congo
- Province: Haut Katanga
- City: Likasi

Panda is a commune of the city of Likasi, which is located in the Haut-Katanga Province of the Democratic Republic of the Congo.

Mining pollution has been a problem in the commune, including uranium contaminating local water supplies.
