= Kambove =

Town in Haut-Katanga, Democratic Republic of the Congo

Coordinates: 10°52′35″S 26°35′49″E

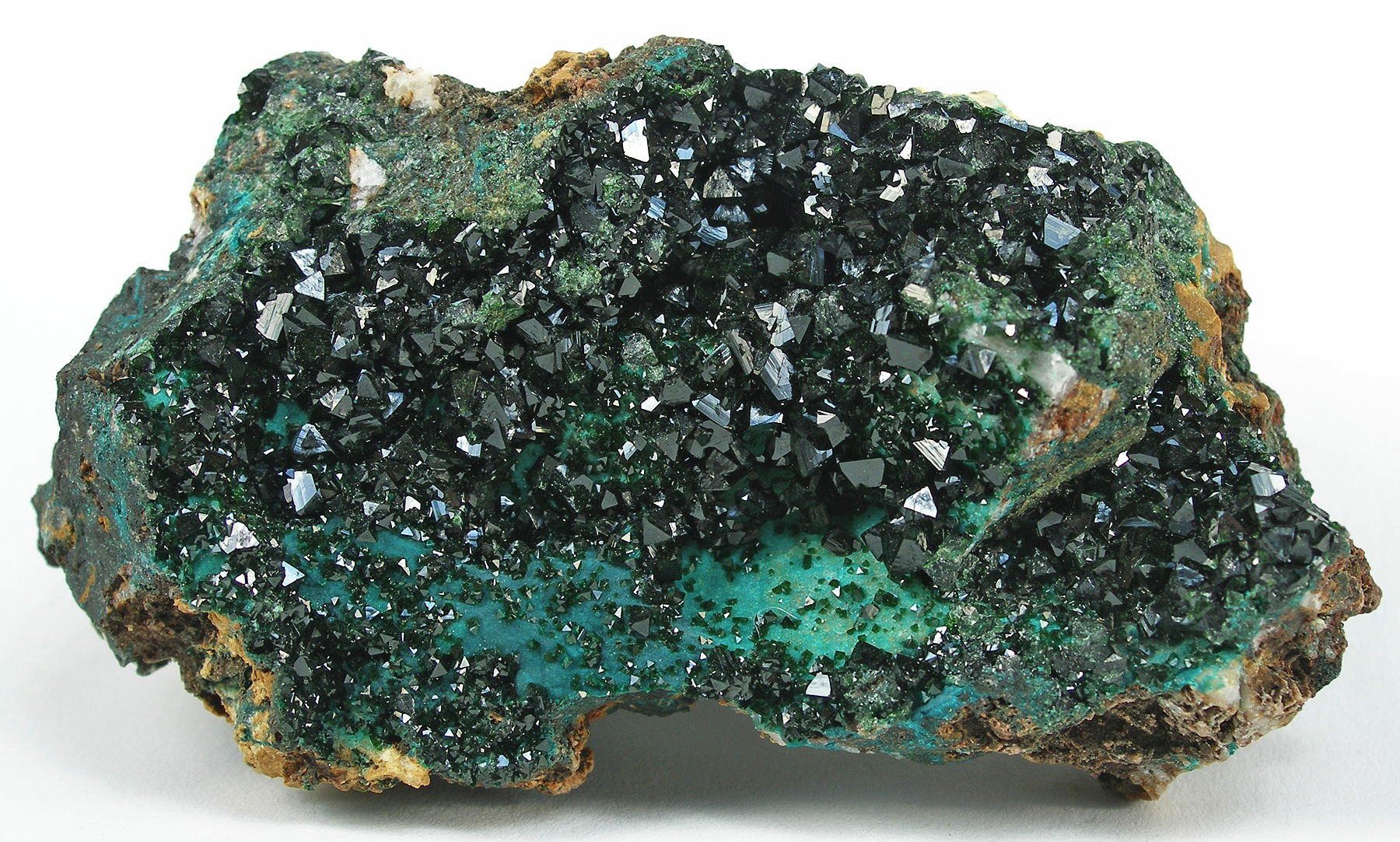
Libethenite crystals to 3 mm from Kambove. Specimen size: 8.0 x 4.6 x 3.3 cm.

Kambove is a town in the Haut-Katanga Province of the Democratic Republic of the Congo.

Kambove lies at an altitude of 1457m (4783 ft). Economic activity in the area includes cobalt processing. Kambove is the center of the Kambove mines region. Gécamines, a state-owned mining company, owns the Kamoya central, Kamoya south, Shangolowe and Kamfundwa mines. Ore from these mines is transported to the concentrator at Kambove for extraction of copper and cobalt.

== Climate ==
Kambove has a humid subtropical climate (Köppen: Cwa).

Climate data for Kambove
Month	Jan	Feb	Mar	Apr	May	Jun	Jul	Aug	Sep	Oct	Nov	Dec	Year
Daily mean °C (°F)	21.1 (70.0)	21.1 (70.0)	21.1 (70.0)	20.4 (68.7)	18.3 (64.9)	16.0 (60.8)	15.6 (60.1)	17.8 (64.0)	20.8 (69.4)	22.3 (72.1)	21.9 (71.4)	21.2 (70.2)	19.8 (67.6)
Average precipitation mm (inches)	206 (8.1)	198 (7.8)	216 (8.5)	67 (2.6)	6 (0.2)	0 (0)	0 (0)	1 (0.0)	10 (0.4)	70 (2.8)	183 (7.2)	224 (8.8)	1,181 (46.4)
Source: Climate-Data.org

== Notable births ==
Cécile Kyenge an Italian minister of Letta Cabinet was born in Kambove.
