= Lubudi Territory =

Lubudi Wilaya ya Lubudi (Swahili)
- Territory
- Interactive map of Lubudi
- Location within Democratic Republic of the Congo
- Coordinates: 9.951593°S 25.963064°E
- Country: DR Congo
- Province: Lualaba Province
- Time zone: UTC+2 (CAT)

Lubudi is a territory in the Lualaba Province of the Democratic Republic of the Congo.

The territory holds the main factory of Ciments et materiaux de construction du Katanga (CIMENKAT).
