= Bukama =

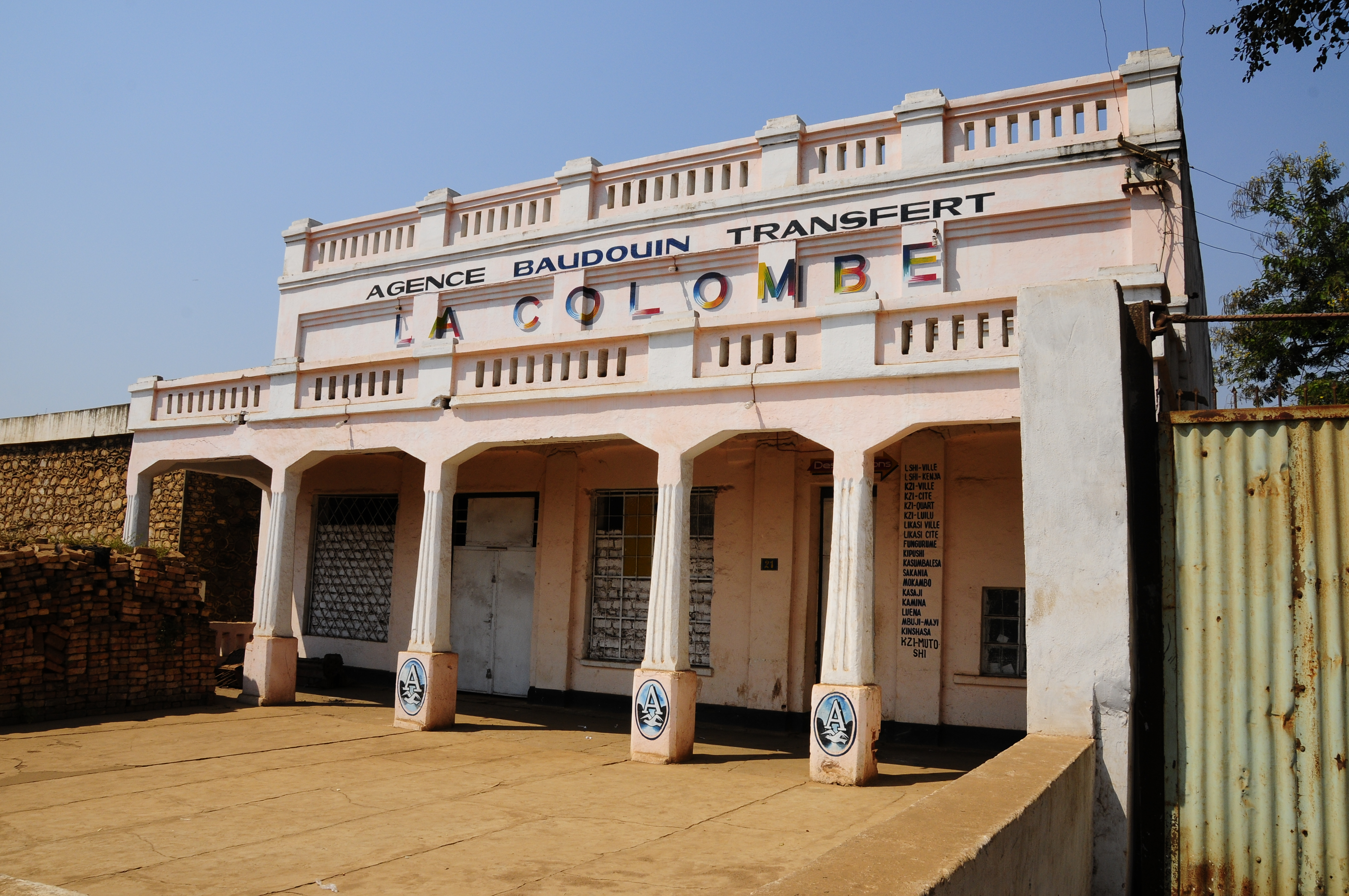

- Location in the Democratic Republic of the Congo
- Coordinates: 9°12′S 25°50′E
- Country: Democratic Republic of the Congo
- Province: Haut-Lomami
- Elevation: 578 m (1,896 ft)

Population (2009)
  - Total: 42,718
- Time zone: UTC+2 (Lubumbashi Time)
- Climate: Aw

Bukama is a town in Haut-Lomami Province of south-eastern Democratic Republic of the Congo. As of 2009 it had an estimated population of 42,718.

== History ==
On 11 January 2026, Mai Mai Kata Katanga attacked a FARDC position at Bukama, reportedly resulting in 13 deaths.

== Climate ==
Köppen-Geiger climate classification system classifies its climate as a tropical savanna climate (Aw).

Climate data for Bukama
| Month | Jan | Feb | Mar | Apr | May | Jun | Jul | Aug | Sep | Oct | Nov | Dec | Year |
|---|---|---|---|---|---|---|---|---|---|---|---|---|---|
| Mean daily maximum °C (°F) | 29.8 (85.6) | 29.9 (85.8) | 30.7 (87.3) | 31.1 (88.0) | 31.8 (89.2) | 30.6 (87.1) | 31.3 (88.3) | 32.6 (90.7) | 34.0 (93.2) | 32.8 (91.0) | 31.5 (88.7) | 29.9 (85.8) | 31.3 (88.4) |
| Daily mean °C (°F) | 24.8 (76.6) | 24.9 (76.8) | 25.5 (77.9) | 25.5 (77.9) | 24.6 (76.3) | 22.6 (72.7) | 22.8 (73.0) | 24.3 (75.7) | 26.2 (79.2) | 26.2 (79.2) | 25.9 (78.6) | 24.9 (76.8) | 24.8 (76.7) |
| Mean daily minimum °C (°F) | 19.9 (67.8) | 20.0 (68.0) | 20.4 (68.7) | 20.0 (68.0) | 17.5 (63.5) | 14.6 (58.3) | 14.4 (57.9) | 16.1 (61.0) | 18.4 (65.1) | 19.6 (67.3) | 20.3 (68.5) | 20.0 (68.0) | 18.4 (65.2) |
| Average precipitation mm (inches) | 95 (3.7) | 77 (3.0) | 86 (3.4) | 39 (1.5) | 4 (0.2) | 0 (0) | 0 (0) | 2 (0.1) | 9 (0.4) | 34 (1.3) | 71 (2.8) | 88 (3.5) | 505 (19.9) |
Source: Climate-Data.org, altitude: 578m

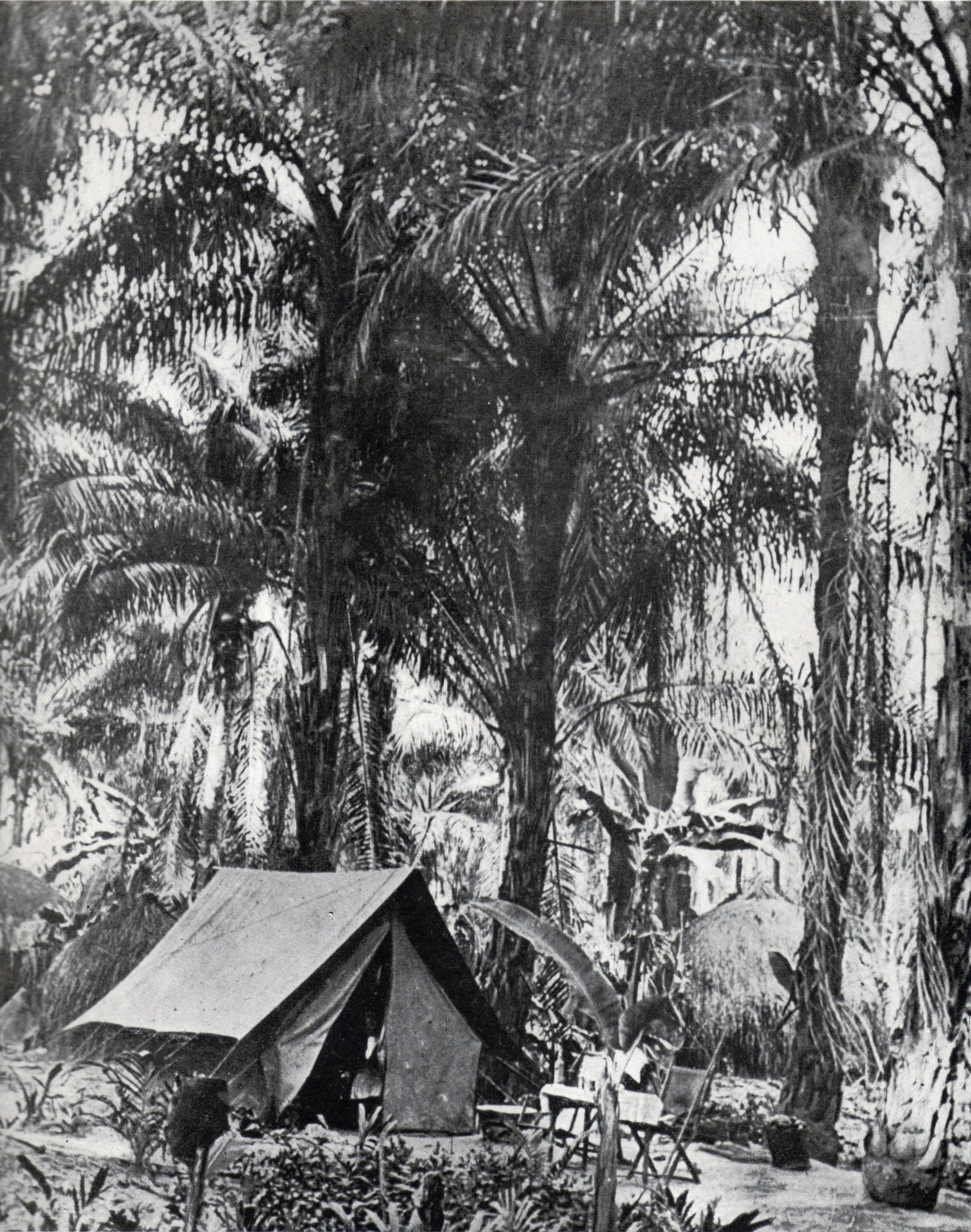
Commandant Léon Tonneau (1863-1919) camp, in his inspection round in Bukama (Katanga) between 1903 and 1906. Tonneau was director of the Comité Spécial du Katanga
