= Likasi =

- City
- Ville de Likasi
- Location in the Democratic Republic of the Congo
- Coordinates: 10°58′53″S 26°44′00″E
- Country: DR Congo
- Province: Haut-Katanga Province
- Communes: Kikula, Likasi, Panda, Shituru

Government
  - Mayor: Henri Mungoma

Area
  - City: 245 km^{2} (95 sq mi)
- Elevation: 1,318 m (4,324 ft)

Population (2015)
  - City: 635,463
  - Density: 2,590/km^{2} (6,720/sq mi)
  - Urban: 495,000
- Time zone: UTC+2 (Central Africa Time)
- Climate: Cwa

Likasi (formerly official names: Jadotville (French) and Jadotstad (Dutch)) is a city in Haut-Katanga Province, in the south-east of the Democratic Republic of Congo.

== Demographics ==
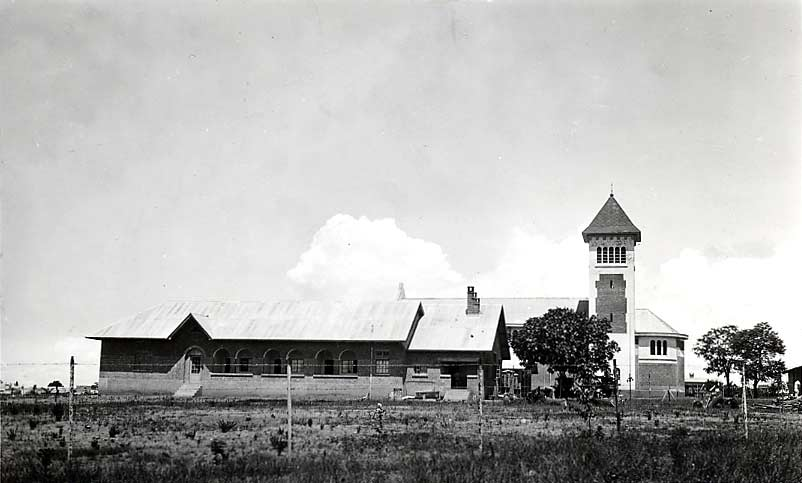
View of Jadotville (Likasi), circa 1930.

Likasi has a population of around 635,000 (2015). During the 1990s the United Nations set up feeding centres and refugee centres in and around Likasi to assist with the refugees fleeing ethnic violence in Shaba, whose arrival had increased the population of the town some 41,000.

== History ==
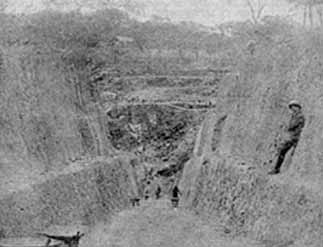
Open cut mine Shinkolobwe by Likasi in the 1920s, men with wheelbarrows pushing ore while an overseer looks on ("Chalux" 1925).

Shinkolobwe mine, 20 km west of Likasi (then called Jadotville), was described by a 1943 Manhattan Project intelligence report as the most important deposit of uranium yet discovered in the world. The uranium from this mine was used to build the atomic bombs used in Hiroshima and Nagasaki in 1945. In 1961, during the United Nations intervention in the Katanga conflict, a company of Irish UN troops deployed to Jadotville fought valiantly, but was besieged and eventually surrendered to troops loyal to the Katangese President Moïse Tshombe.

== Economy ==
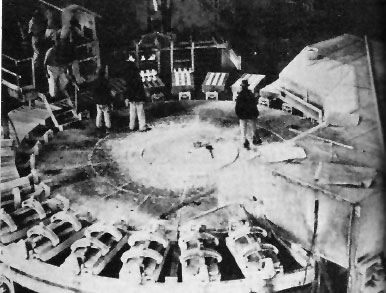
Interior of a factory in Jadotville, Belgian Congo circa 1942

Likasi remains a centre for industry, especially mining, and is a transport hub for the surrounding region. There are mines and refineries supplied by nearby deposits of copper and cobalt. A $17 million crushing plant was installed in nearby Kamatanda that became operational at the start of 2019. The crushed ore is fed to the Heap Leach Unit in Panda, then the copper-containing solution is taken to the electrolysis room at the Shituru Factories in Likasi, where high-quality copper electrodes are produced. There is also an abandoned gold mine in Likasi, which has been commercially depleted but is still dug by artisanal miners.

== Transport ==
Likasi is served by a station on the national railway system. The trains are mostly cargo trains and not passenger trains.

== Climate ==
Likasi has a humid subtropical climate (Köppen: Cwa).

Climate data for Likasi
Month	Jan	Feb	Mar	Apr	May	Jun	Jul	Aug	Sep	Oct	Nov	Dec	Year
Daily mean °C (°F)	21.4 (70.5)	21.5 (70.7)	21.5 (70.7)	20.9 (69.6)	18.6 (65.5)	16.2 (61.2)	15.9 (60.6)	18.1 (64.6)	21.3 (70.3)	22.8 (73.0)	22.3 (72.1)	21.7 (71.1)	20.2 (68.4)
Average precipitation mm (inches)	212 (8.3)	205 (8.1)	214 (8.4)	62 (2.4)	6 (0.2)	0 (0)	0 (0)	0 (0)	8 (0.3)	65 (2.6)	177 (7.0)	226 (8.9)	1,175 (46.2)
Source: Climate-Data.org

== See also ==
- Railway stations in DRCongo
- Siege of Jadotville
