= Jadot =

Jadot (/ʒəˈdoʊ/, French: [ʒado]) is a French or Belgian surname. It may refer to:

== People ==
- Jean Jadot (1909–2009), Belgian prelate of the Roman Catholic Church
- Jean Jadot (banker) (1862–1932), Belgian railway engineer and banker
- Jean Jadot (footballer) (1928–2007), Belgian football player
- Lambert Jadot (1875–1967), Belgian railway engineer and executive
- Maxime Jadot (born 1957), Belgian banker
- Odon Jadot (1884–1968), Belgian railway engineer and administrator
- Yannick Jadot (born 1967), French environmentalist and politician

== Other ==
- Maison Louis Jadot, a French winery
