= Odon Jadot =

Belgian railway engineer and administrator

- Born: 13 April 1884; Liège, Belgium
- Died: 16 April 1968 (aged 84); Kraainem, Belgium
- Occupation: Railway engineer

Odon Jadot (French: [ɔdɔ̃ ʒado]; 13 April 1884 – 16 April 1968) was a Belgian railway engineer and administrator. He was responsible for building more than 1,650 kilometres (1,030 mi) of railroad in the Belgian Congo. The lines helped carry copper mined in the Katanga Province to the sea via the ports of Matadi in the Congo, Dilolo in Angola and Beira in Mozambique. They also supported troop movements during World War I (1914–1918) and World War II (1939–1945).

== Family ==
Odon Jadot was born on 13 April 1884 in Liège, Belgium. His parents were Odon Jadot (born 1850) and Adeline Leroy. His uncle Jean Baptiste Jadot (1839–1887) was father of Jean Jadot and Lambert Jadot. Both of them later had distinguished careers as engineers and colonial businessmen. His aunt Christine Jadot (1841–1911) was mother of Alexis Bertrand (1870–1946), who became a senior colonial administrator in the Belgian Congo.

== Early career (1906–1914) ==
Railways in the Belgian Congo

Odon Jadot joined the army, studied at the School of Practical Artillery and Engineering and graduated with a diploma in civil engineering in 1906. He went on to the Montefiore Institute in Liège, where he obtained a diploma as an electrical engineer in 1908. He was a second lieutenant in engineering when he left the army in July 1909 and joined the Compagnie du chemin de fer du bas-Congo au Katanga (BCK). Although he had an assured career as an army engineer, he wanted to emulate his cousins in their work overseas.

The Comité Spécial du Katanga (CSK), the Congo Free State and the Société Générale de Belgique had founded the BCK on 31 October 1906. The Union Minière du Haut-Katanga (UMHK) acquired almost 10% of the BCK, but the government was the main shareholder. Odon Jadot's cousin Jean Jadot was made managing director. The BCK was to survey, build and operate a railway line from the navigable part of the Lualaba to the southern border of Katanga where it could connect to the Rhodesian network. It was also to survey, build and operate railway lines to Port Franqui on the Kasai River, from where river boats could carry ore to Léopoldville and Bas-Congo, and to the Portuguese Benguela railway.

During Odon Jadot's first term in the Belgian Congo from 1909 to 1912 he worked under the British contractor Pauling & Co., which had built the line from Beira to Broken Hill (Kabwe) in Rhodesia, and had been contracted by the BCK to extend the line to the UMHK's Etoile copper mine. Jadot learned his trade during this project, in which the line was often extended by 5 kilometres (3.1 mi) or more in a single day. He later wrote that he learned from the English how they planned and built railways in Central Africa, and applied these practices with no significant change to build 1,650 kilometres (1,030 mi) of railroad in the Congo. Jadot carried out initial studies for the line from Elisabethville (Lubumbashi) to the Kambove copper mine in 1911, and in 1912 was involved in the start of construction of this section.

Jadot returned to Southampton in 1912, where his brother met him with a letter from his cousin Jean Jadot offering him charge of an expedition to find a river and rail route from the Léopoldville (Kinshasa)) on the Stanley Pool (Pool Malebo) to Katanga. The railroad would extend southeast from the highest navigable point on the Kasai River or its left tributaries. Odon Jadot led 25 soldier and 100 porters on this mission, which had to face several attacks from the local people. The project was abandoned and the expedition dissolved at the start of World War I (1914–1918).

== World War I (1914–1918) ==
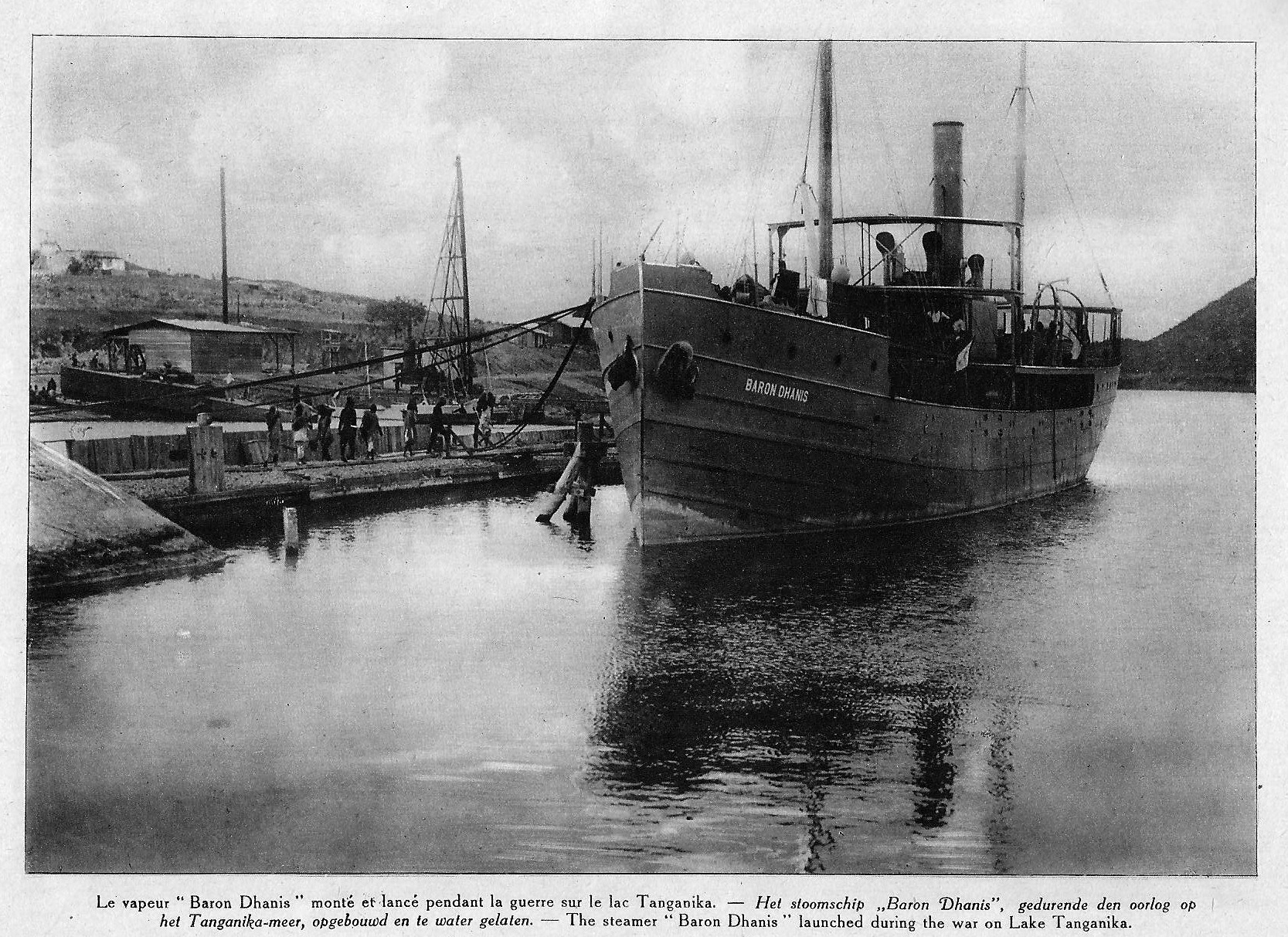
Baron Dhanis on the lake, c. 1916.

The Germans were masters of Lake Tanganyika when the war began, although they soon lost control due to combined operations by the British and Belgians. However, to support the armies fighting east of the lake a railway was needed between Kabalo on the Lualaba River and Albertville (Kalemie) on the west shore of the lake. Jadot was mobilized in 1915 and assigned to the troops stationed on the shores of Lake Tanganyika, where he drafted plans for building the port of Albertville. Commandant Jadot organized and directed the service engineers in construction of the Albertville naval base. In January 1916 Georges Moulaert was given command of a unit on Lake Tanganyika. In April 1916 he was promoted to lieutenant-colonel of the Force publique. Moulaert built the dry dock and port.

The Compagnie du chemin de fer du Congo supérieur aux Grands Lacs africains (CFL) had the railway concession in this region. The section from Kabalo to AIbertville (Kalemie) ran along the rocky Lukuga River valley, and had been started in April 1911. Progress was slow, and an outbreak of beriberi at the start of 1914 caused further delays. Jadot quickly completed the railway. Construction was completed in 1915, and a navigation service was established on Lake Tanganyika. The boat Baron Dhanis was brought up by rail, assembled and put into service on the lake on 17 November 1916. Temporary wooden bridges had been replaced by permanent bridges by 1921.

The companies depended for meat on subcontractors of Italian, Greek, English or Scottish origin, who organized teams of native hunters recruited from Rhodesia and the Lake Bangwelo region. According to Jadot,

Each subcontractor maintained several native hunters who approached easily, in the savannah, these not very shy animals, at least in the beginning. In each camp, porters were seen arriving every day, announcing themselves with often very beautiful songs, bringing antelopes, zebras or wild pigs, butchered or whole depending on their size. All of this was immediately cut up and distributed to black workers.

After the Belgian victory at Tabora Jadot was responsible from repairing the central line from Kigoma to Tabora. He then returned to Belgium where he commanded a company of engineers on the Yser front.

== Bukama to Port-Francqui (1920–1928) ==
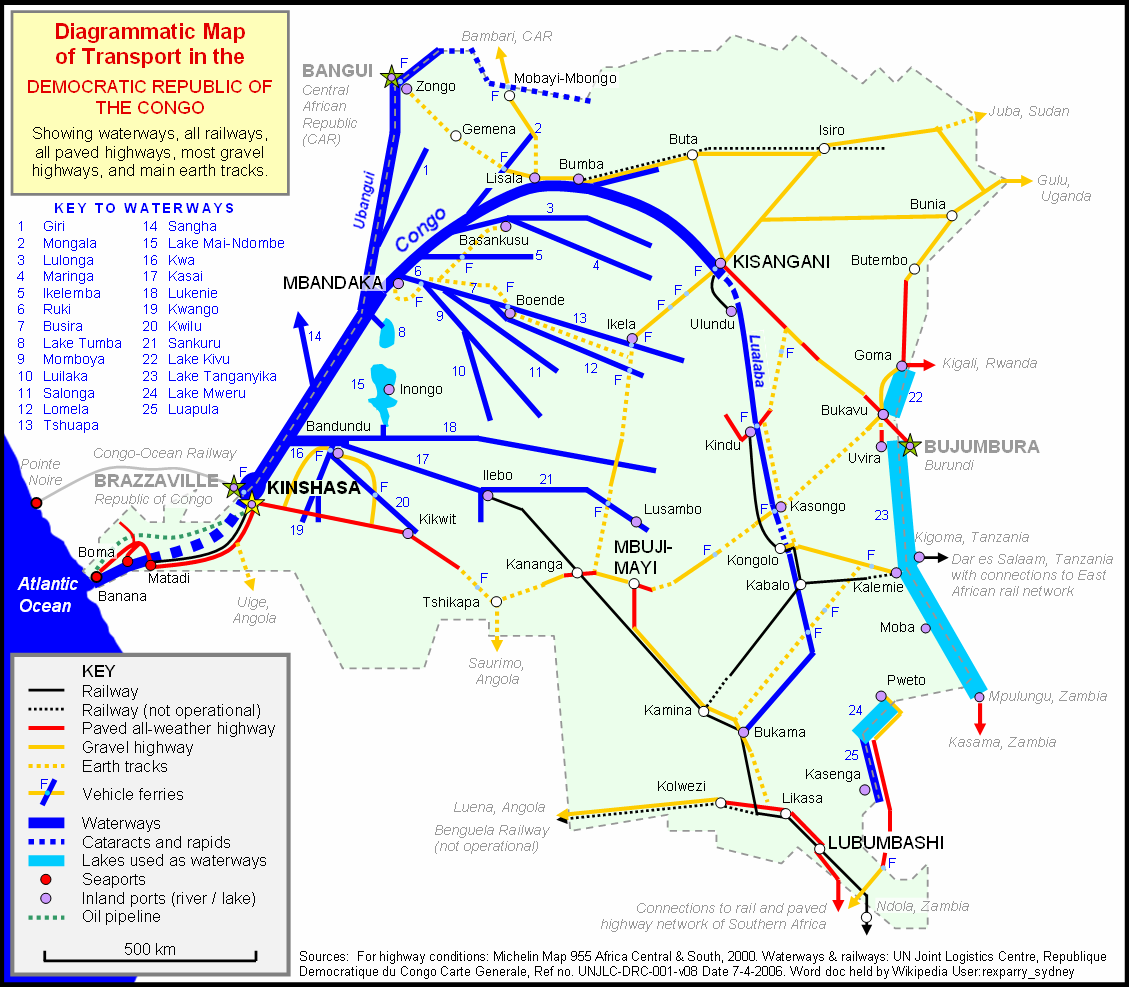
Diagrammatic map of the river and rail network

In 1920 Jadot undertook a temporary assignment for the UMHK.

Odon Jadot's cousin Lambert Jadot was managing director of the BCK, which had continued to expand during the war. The line from Elisabethville (Lubumbashi) northwest to Bukama on the Lualaba River had been started in 1911 and completed in 1918. The route leading south up the Lualaba River from Stanleyville (Kisangani) had reached Bukama in 1919, beyond which the Lualaba was not navigable. However, the Elisabethville–Stanleyville–Léopoldville–Matadi route involved three river sections and four rail links to avoid non-navigable sections, and was not an economical solution for export of copper from Katanga.

In 1921 the minister Louis Franck obtained permission from parliament to start work on a one-stop rail / river link running northwest from Bukama to Léopoldville, the project that Odon Jadot had abandoned in 1914. Odon Jadot was charged by Lambert Jadot with resuming this project. The railway line would run from Bukama to the navigable part of the Kasai River. There the minerals would be transshipped to riverboats and carried to Léopoldville (Kinshasa). From there, they would be taken on the Matadi–Kinshasa Railway down to the Atlantic port of Matadi for export. (Note: The Elisabethville–Port Francqui–Léopoldville–Matadi route was superior to the Elisabethville–Stanleyville–Léopoldville–Matadi route, but still involved two transshipments.)

To reduce cost, the new route was to avoid crossing the Kasai tributaries, and instead was to follow a ridge line to the head of navigation. Originally Charlesville (Djoko Punda) had been planned as the terminus on the Kasai, but Jadot did not believe the water would be deep enough for shipping throughout the year. Jadot prospected a 1,123 kilometres (698 mi) route to Port-Francqui (Ilebo) near the confluence of the Sankuru River with the Kasai. It had to pass through 200 miles (320 km) of tropical forest, cutting across the Kuba Kingdom, but by the end of 1922 the company and the government had agreed on this route. Jadot planned the construction project carefully with the full cooperation of the territorial administration.

Jadot was asked to start construction of the central section in April 1923. Separate teams were building the 178 kilometres (111 mi) section from Ilebo to Mweka, and the southern section near Bukama. Early on there was a smallpox outbreak in the laborer's camps at Ilebo and Mweka, but it was swiftly contained and followed by campaigns to vaccinate the laborers. To attract workers from employment by Forminière, Jadot offered better wages and living conditions, and built a service road so that fresh food could be supplied by truck. The Kuba king cooperated, growing surplus maize and manioc to feed the workforce, helping to clear the forest along the route, and providing laborers to build roads, rest houses and auxiliary airfields.

In 1924 Jadot inspected progress near Bukama before taking leave in Europe. Émile Francqui, chairman of the BCK, arranged for Jadot to be appointed general manager of the BCK in July 1924. Construction of the "national road" continued under Jadot's leadership at over 200 kilometres (120 mi) per year. More than 170,000 tons of material were imported for the project. 1,000 Europeans and 100,000 Congolese worked on construction of the BCK, although there were no more than 15,000 local workers at any given time. The railway was built in five years, with little loss of life compared to other projects in the region. The railway had a major impact on the economy, politics and demography of the region it crossed, and caused the emergence of the Luba tribal grouping. At first it was a drain on the Société Générale's profits. In April 1927 the Société des Chemins de fer Léopoldville-Katanga-Dilolo (Léokadi or LKD) was founded to take over the railway concession. In July 1928 the line was formally inaugurated by King Albert I of Belgium, Queen Elisabeth and the governor of the Société Générale.

== BCK senior executive ==
=== Pre.war (1928–1939) ===
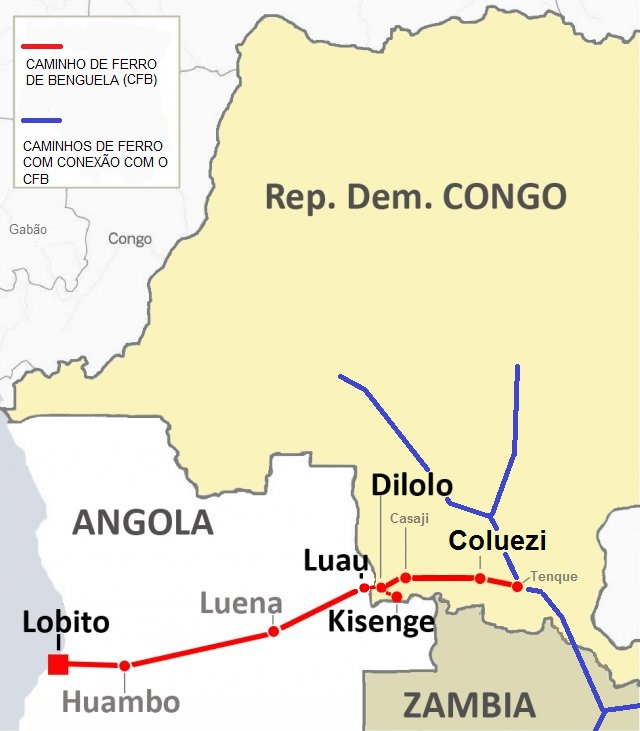
Benguela railway and Katanga link

Jadot was appointed administrator of the BCK later in 1928 and at once began construction of a 522 kilometres (324 mi) link to the Benguela railway, built by the British Tanganyika Concessions and extending from Lobito on the Atlantic coast of Angola to Dilolo on the border with Katanga. Construction began in March 1929 and was completed in two years, opening a third and much more economical link from Katanga to the sea when compared with the BCK and the Beira line. During the Great Depression of the 1930s the Congo economy suffered badly, affecting profitability of the BCK and Benguela lines. Jadot suggested that the state should help the indigenous peasantry by providing agricultural implements and seeds, and tried to promote exports of corn from the Lomami-Kasaï region to Belgium.

As of 1936 Jadot was managing director of LKD, under Guilleaume Olyff as president, and administrative director of CFK under Lambert Jadot as president. In June 1937 Jadot was appointed managing director of BCK. In July 1937 the CFL began a line from Kongolo to Kabalo, which was inaugurated on 31 December 1939. There was now a continuous railway line from the river port of Kindu to Albertville on Lake Tanganyika. Jadot started to explore the possibility of linking the BCK to the CFL, which would open a route from Katanga to the Indian Ocean via Lake Tanganyika. A road was built from Kamina to Kabalo in preparation for building the rail link, but the project was put on hold when World War II (1939–1945) began. The road was useful for transport of troops between South Africa, Rhodesia and the East African territories.

=== World War II (1939–1945) ===
Jadot remained in the Congo throughout the war, and ensured that the BCK and Société minière du Bécéka (Note: In 1919 the BCK had founded the subsidiary Société Minière du Bécéka for mining research.) made a full contribution to the war effort. The UMHK exported uranium ore, described as "special crude ore", to the United States via the port of Matadi. Governor Pierre Ryckmans was uncertain about what it was to be used for, but supported the shipments. Soon after the invasion of Belgium a meeting was held in the Elisabethville home of Jules Cousin, administrative head of UMHK, where ways of supporting Hitler and Léopold III were discussed. Odon Jadot was present, as were Jean-Félix de Hemptinne, vicar apostolic of Katanga, and Delannoy, head of the local court of appeals. They decided to write to Ryckmans asking him keep the Congo neutral, willing to trade with America, England and Germany, and not to make any anti-German gestures. However, Jadot backed out at the last minute, noting that his brother was a prisoner of war in Germany, and that in his view the letter would be unpatriotic. Soon after, Jadot came out firmly in support of Ryckmans, which was key to ensuring the uranium shipments over the BCK line went ahead. He may have been influenced by the fact that the United States was facilitating and partly funding new cranes, sidings and wagons and repairs to existing equipment. Rail traffic doubled, and in 1943–1944 Jadot had the BCK quays, stores and warehouses expanded to meet anticipated post-war demand.

=== Post-War (1945–1968) ===
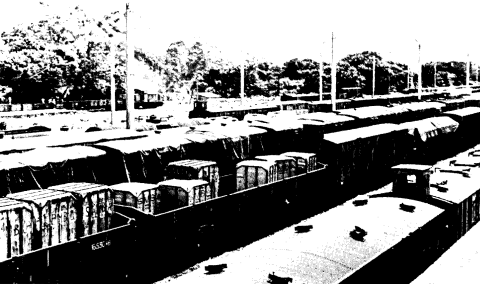
Rolling stock, Kamina switching yards

Jadot returned to Belgium in July 1945, and from now on only visited the Congo for short trips. He was appointed president of the CFK (Kamina–Kabalo line) and LKD in 1949. LKD held the rail network concessions in Katanga, while BCK was the operator. Jadot sponsored studies of the link between Kamina and Kabalo in 1948–1949. The Minister of Colonies authorized construction in 1951, and Jadot resigned as managing director of BCK but remained vice-chairman of the board. On 29 February 1952 the BCK and CFMK formally merged to form the Compagnie des Chemins de fer Katanga-Dilolo-Léopoldville (KDL).

Between 1952 and 1956 the CFL built a 246 kilometres (153 mi) line from Kabalo to Kabongo. The line from Kabongo to Kamina was built by the BCK for the KDL. In September 1955 the CFL converted from 1,000 mm (3 ft 3 3/8 in) to 1,067 mm (3 ft 6 in) gauge to match the KDL gauge. Jadot also pressed for construction of a line from Port-Francqui to Léopoldville, bypassing the Kasai river section, but was unable to gain support for this project.

Odon Jadot died on 16 April 1968 in Kraainem, Belgium at the age of 84.

== Acronyms ==
Acr.	Founded	Full name	Description
BCK	1906	Compagnie du chemin de fer du bas-Congo au Katanga	Operator of rail and river transport in Katanga founded in 1906
CFK	1902	Compagnie de Chemin de fer du Katanga	Operator of railway line in Katanga from the Lualaba down to the Rhodesian border. Controlled by the BCK from 1906
CFL	1902	Compagnie du chemin de fer du Congo supérieur aux Grands Lacs africains	Operator of rail and river transport south of Stanleyville (Kisangani) to Lake Tanganyika
CFMK	1887	Chemin de Fer Matadi-Kinshasa	Matadi–Kinshasa Railway
CSK	1900	Comité Spécial du Katanga	Parastatal responsible for administering and developing Katanga
KDL	1952	Compagnie des Chemins de fer Katanga-Dilolo-Léopoldville	Holding company for all Katanga railway concessions: BCK and CFK
LKD	1927	Société des Chemins de fer Léopoldville-Katanga-Dilolo	Holding company for the BCK concessions
UMHK	1906	Union Minière du Haut-Katanga	Mining company in Katanga

== Sources ==
- "Archives du groupe Empain" (PDF), Africa Museum.be (in French)
- BCK - KDL - Le site des chemins de fer du Katanga, 2010, archived from the original on 2010-12-04
- "Belgian Congo (1)", World Survey of Foreign Railways, United States. Foreign and Domestic Commerce Bureau, 25 September 1936
- Bobb, F. Scott (2010), "Railways" (PDF), Historical Dictionary of the Democratic Republic of the Congo (3 ed.), Scarecrow Press, ISBN 978-0-8108-6325-5
- Brion, R.; Moreau, J.-L. (2007), "Jadot (Odon)", Biographie Belge d'Outre-Mer, vol. IX, Acad. Roy. Science d'Outre-Mer, pp. col.204–210
- Dellicour, M. F. (1948), "Le Général Tombeur de Tabora" (PDF), Bulletin des Séances (in French), Institut Royal Colonial Belge
- Ergo, A.´B. (2013), WANGERMEE Emile Antoine Marie (1855-1924) (PDF)
- Jacquemin, H. (June 1965), "Operations Navales sur le Lac Tanganika au course de la Premiere Guerre Mondiale" (PDF), Neptunus (in French), Oostende
- Lederer, A. (June 1965), "Scheepswerven in de Kongolese Demokratische Republiek Vandeeg en Morgen" (PDF), Neptunus (in Dutch), Oostende
- Pierfit, "Odon JADOT", Geneanet
- Pierfit2, "Jean Baptiste JADOT", Geneanet
- Rixke (18 January 2012), "La compagnie des chemins de fer du Congo supérieur aux Grands Lacs Africains (C.F.L.)", Rixke Rail’s Archives (in French)
- Translations on Sub-Saharan Africa, Issues 2019-2023, United States. Joint Publications Research Service, 1978
- Van Schuylenbergh, Patricia (2009), "Entre Délinquance et Résistance au Congo Belge : L'Interprétation Coloniale du Braconnage", Afrique & histoire (in French), vol. 7, Verdier, pp. 25–48, doi:10.3917/afhi.007.0025, ISBN 9782864325826, ISSN 1764-1977
- Vansina, Jan (2010), Being Colonized: The Kuba Experience in Rural Congo, 1880–1960, Univ of Wisconsin Press, pp. 342 pages, ISBN 9780299236434
- Vanthemsche, Guy (29 April 2013), "MOULAERT (George Brunon)", Biographical Dictionary of Overseas Belgians (in French), ARSOM
- Vanthemsche, Guy (19 November 2019), "BERTRAND (Alexis Félicien)", Biographie Belge D'Outre-mer, Academie Royale des Sciences D'Outremer – via RAOS
- Williams, Susan (2016), Spies in the Congo: America's Atomic Mission in World War II, Hachette UK, pp. 432 pages, ISBN 9781610396554
