= Firmin Van Brée =

Belgian engineer

- Born: 28 May 1880; Anderlecht, Brussels, Belgium
- Died: 26 March 1960 (aged 79); Saint-Jean-de-Luz, Pyrénées-Atlantiques, France
- Occupation: Company administrator

Firmin Van Brée (28 May 1880 – 26 March 1960) was a Belgian engineer who played a leading role in developing the Belgian companies that exploited the mineral and agricultural resources of the Belgian Congo. Although involved in a wide range of activities, his primary interest was in diamond mining. During World War II it was suspected that he helped supply the Germans with diamonds from the Congo. After the war he retired to Saint-Jean-de-Luz in the south of France, where he owned three villas and had a small chapel and a crypt built, where he is buried.

== Early years (1880–1914) ==
Firmin Van Brée was born on 28 May 1880 in Anderlecht, Brussels, Belgium. He attended the Université catholique de Louvain and graduated in 1903 with a degree in civil engineering and a license in commercial and consular sciences. He joined the Compagnie du chemin de fer du Congo as an engineer, and sailed to the Congo Free State (later to become the Belgian Congo, today the Democratic Republic of the Congo), where he worked on the newly completed railway line from Matadi to the Stanley Pool (Pool Malebo). By the end of his two-year term he had been promoted to head of the movement and traction department.

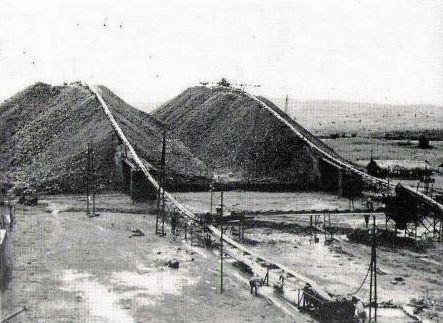
Slag heaps at Forminière's diamond installations in Kasai, c.1959

On his return to Belgium Van Brée was employed by Jean Jadot as technical secretary. Jadot was one of the founders of the three "1906 companies", the Union Minière du Haut-Katanga, the Compagnie du chemin de fer du bas-Congo au Katanga (BCK) and Forminière, and was to become governor of the Société Générale de Belgique. Van Brée's primary responsibility was with Forminière, a large and diversified enterprise involved in forestry, mining, agriculture, industry, commerce and finance, with prospecting rights over one third of the Congo Free State. Van Brée organized and led several prospecting expeditions in the districts of Kasai, Maniema, Uele, Lac Léopold II, Bas-Congo and Kwango. For five years the results were disappointing, but in October 1911 diamond deposits were found in Kasai. Exploitation began at once, and the first shipment of diamonds reached Antwerp at the end of 1913, a few months before the start of World War I.

== World War I (1914–1918) ==
After the outbreak of war, on 1 September 1914 the Central Committee for the Supply of Brussels was formed with Dannie Heineman as chairman. Other members were Firmin Van Brée, Maurice Despret of the Banque de Bruxelles, Baron Janssen of the Générale de Banque and the electrical industrialist Count Carlo Cicogna Mozzoni. On 5 September an Executive Committee was set up under Émile Francqui, with a mandate that soon expanded to cover all of Belgium, which became the National Committee for Relief and Food (Comité National de Secours et d'Alimentation: CNSA). Van Brée served as deputy to Francqui on the CNSA. He was praised for his services by the future American president Herbert Hoover, who had established the Commission for Relief in Belgium (CRB) to provide food to the CNSA. He was made an Officer of the Legion of Honour.

== Interwar period (1918–1940) ==
Belgian Congo in 1954 showing the main language groups

After the war Van Brée participated in establishing many mining, industrial, agricultural and commercial companies in the Congo. His main interest continued to be the diamond companies. Forminière was restructured with its Forescom subsidiary taking over forestry, agriculture and commerce operations, and its Société Minière de la Tele subsidiary taking over gold and tin mining. Forminière concentrated on exploiting diamond deposits in the Tshikapa region of Kasai, and also worked deposits on behalf of other companies such as the Société minière du Bécéka from 1919. In 1924 Van Brée became a director of the Société Générale de Belgique.

Diamond production in the Congo grew from 215,000 carats in 1918 to 8,360,000 carats in 1939, two thirds of world production. Mostly these were industrial diamonds. Van Brée cooperated with Ernest Oppenheimer of South Africa, and in 1927 struck an agreement for a world organization for diamond sales. Van Brée pioneered establishment of medical facilities, maternity wards, child care and schools for the families of Forminière workers. The iron and copper ores found in the Congo contained uranium and radium, which were used for treatment of cancers, and this drew him into an interest in cancer research. He took over management of the Société Générale de Belgique in 1934.

Van Brée was involved in creation and management of about sixty companies in the Belgian Congo. He helped found the Société Générale Métallurgique d'Ioboken, the Société Générale des Minerais (Sogemin), the Compagnie Cotonnière Congolaise (Cotonco), the Société Générale des Forces Hydro-électriques du Katanga (Sogefor), the Société d'Elevage et de Culture, the Compagnie foncière du Katanga and the Minoteries du Katanga. He was president of most of these companies. He also became president of the Compagnie du Katanga and vice president of the Compagnie du Congo pour le Commerce et l'Industrie.

Outside the Société Générale group he was president of the Compagnie du chemin de fer du Congo supérieur aux Grands Lacs africains (CFL), the Compagnie Minière des Grands-Lacs (MGL), the Societé anonyme belge d'Exploitation de la Navigation aérienne (Sabena) and a director of many other enterprises in Belgium, the Congo and elsewhere. Van Brée was also involved in the University of Louvain, the University Foundation, the Cancer Research Institute, the Père Damien Foundation for the fight against leprosy, the Institute of Tropical Medicine and the Hoover Foundation for development of the University of Louvain.

== World War II (1940–1945) ==
When Belgium was invaded in May 1940 during World War II (1939–1945) Van Brée left for the Congo, where he took responsibility for the companies of the Société Générale de Belgique. These companies produced strategic materials such as copper, cobalt, uranium, industrial diamonds, manganese, fibers and rubber. During the war there were frequent rumors that some Belgian industrialists involved in colonial enterprises were covertly aiding Germany. American officials found working with Belgo-Congolese mining companies to secure industrial diamonds to be difficult. According to the Belgian government, by 1942 the colony's entire output of industrial diamonds was being shipped to the United Kingdom. In reality, many industrial diamonds were smuggled to Nazi Germany for use in the German war effort. Most Congolese diamonds were mined by Forminière, a subsidiary of the Société Générale de Belgique, which was in turn a member of the De Beers Diamond Syndicate. In 1940, the Syndicate reported that the Congo annually produced 10.9 million carats of diamonds. Immediately after the outbreak of war reported production sharply declined, and by 1942 production had officially fallen to 5 million carats–roughly the original production number minus the amount exported to Germany before the war.

Believing that a large volume of diamonds were being smuggled out of the colony, American intelligence officials convinced British agents to inspect the security of the mines. The officer tasked with overseeing the inspection teams concluded that proper security measures were lacking and that Forminière and Société minière du Bécéka personnel fostered a "sinister atmosphere" during the tours. Van Brée was widely suspected of maintaining German sympathies. In 1943 Germany paid the Société Générale $10.5 million for diamonds. American and British agents ultimately uncovered a wide smuggling network that brought diamonds out of the Congo and to German-occupied Europe by air and sea. Proposals by the Americans to stifle the illicit trade were dissuaded by the British Ministry of Economic Warfare, whose Diamond Committee was dominated by members of the De Beers Diamond Syndicate. After the end of the war the Belgian government demanded that Germany pay $25 million owed to the Société Générale for 576,676 carats of diamonds.

== Last years (1945–1960) ==
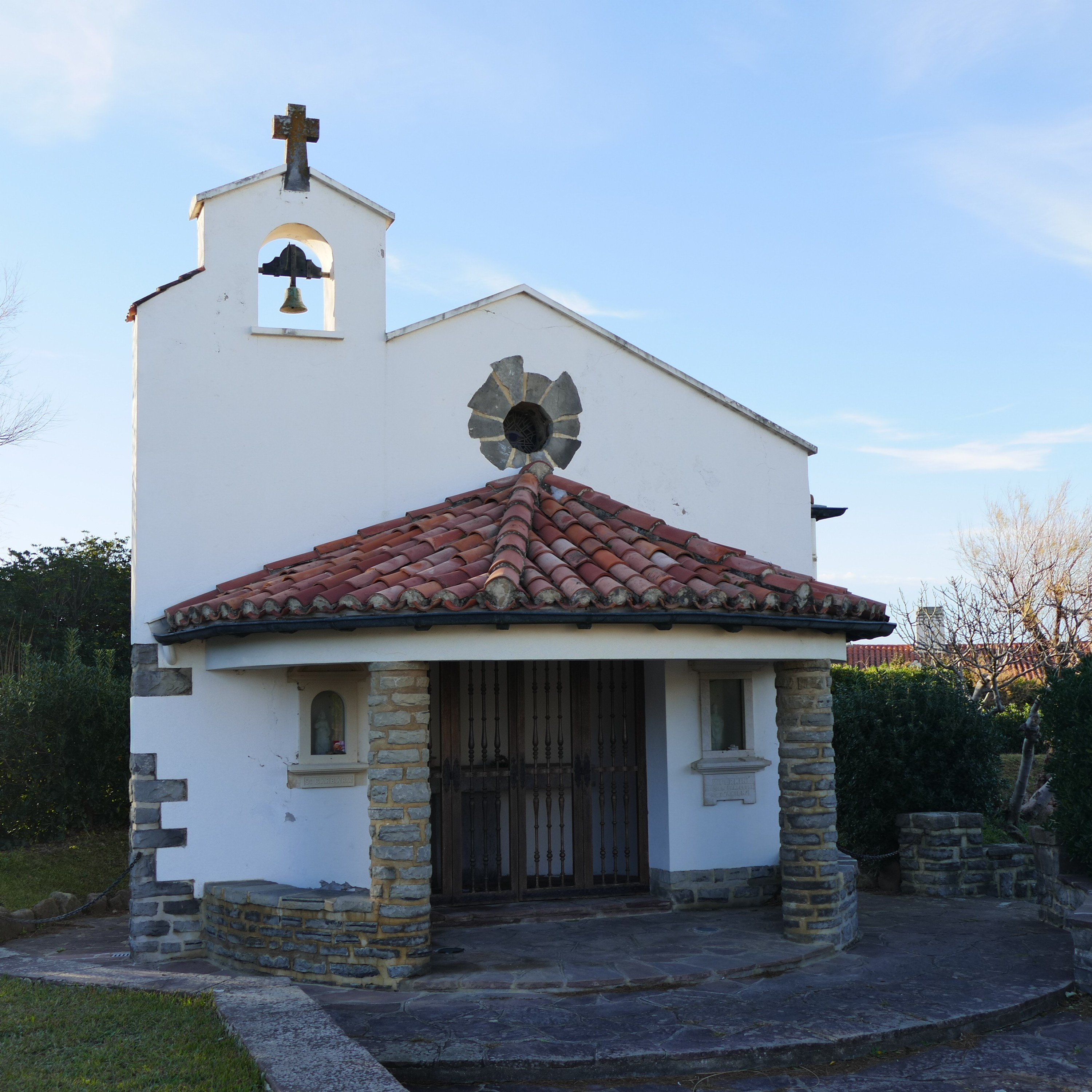
The Firmin Van Brée chapel constructed by André Pavlovsky

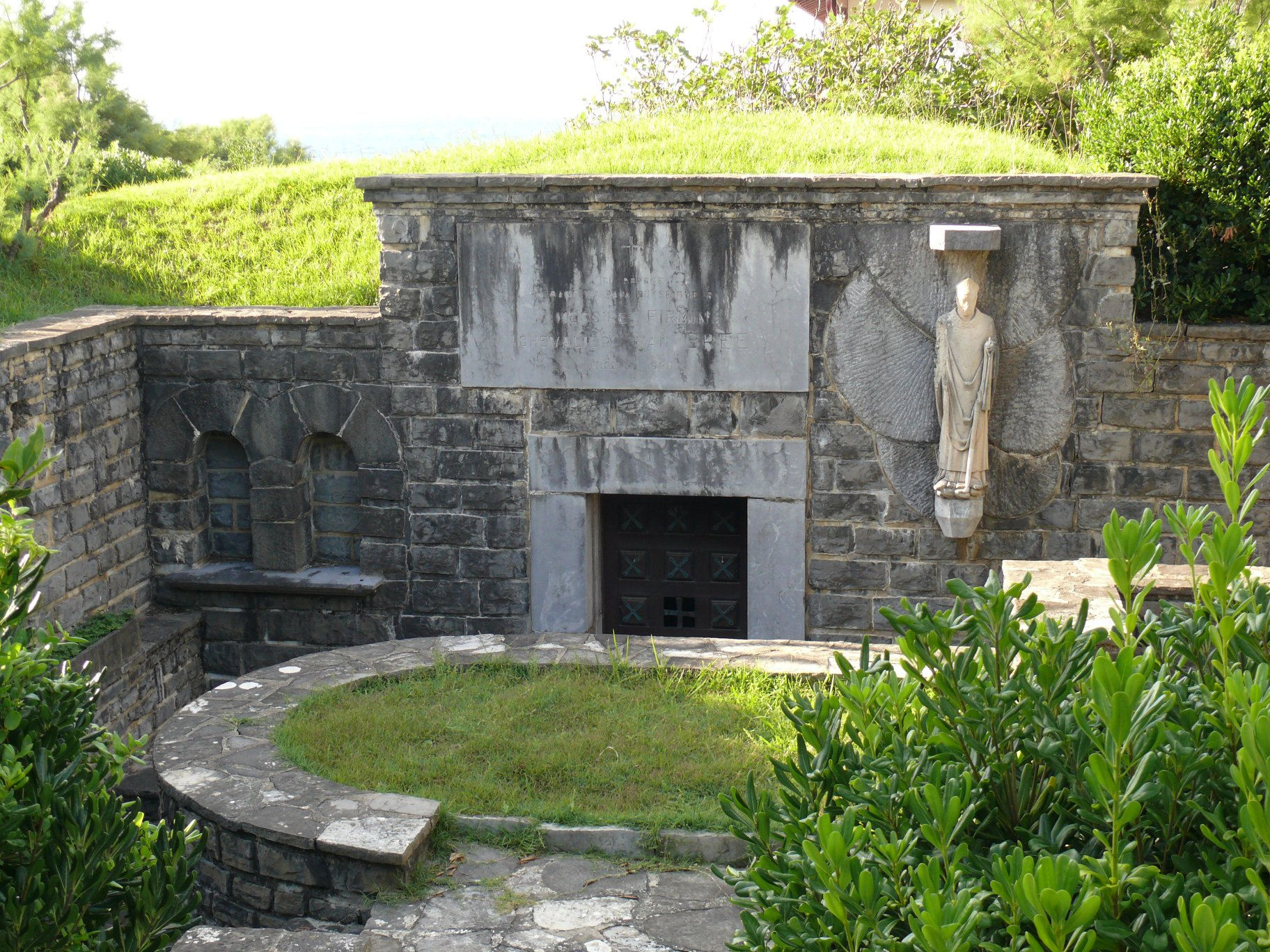
Crypt of Firmin Van Brée in Saint-Jean-de-Luz

From 1944 to 1947 Van Brée was chairman of the Union Minière du Haut-Katanga, based in Brussels. After World War II Van Brée gradually withdrew from involvement in business and became more interested in educational and scientific institutions. He was a patron of the Catholic University of Leuven, funding the Special Schools, the Congolese Home and the Pius X College He played a large role in the creation of Lovanium University in the Congo. In August 1948 he was awarded an honorary doctorate in applied sciences by the University of Louvain for his work in the Congo. He was a member of the General Council of the University and the Board of Directors of the Hoover Foundation for Development at the University of Leuven. He was also a director of the University Foundation and of the National Cancer Foundation.

In the 1920s Van Brée had bought land in the Sainte Barbe district of Saint-Jean-de-Luz in the Pyrénées-Atlantiques department in the extreme south of France where he had three very well designed and comfortable neo-Basque villas built by the architect André Pavlovsky. Van Brée used to spend summers there between his trips to the Congo. Van Brée did much to help the development of Saint-Jean-de-Luz, including construction of Basque motels, and was named an honorary citizen of the town. In the last years of his life Van Brée settled in one of the villas in Saint-Jean-de-Luz.

In the late 1950s a tiny chapel and a crypt were built there to the design of his friend André Pavlovsky. The small neo-Basque chapel is built of local rocks and is covered by a semi-circular roof with a steeple topped by a small cross. It has two Art Deco stained glass windows designed by Francis Chigot (1879–1960), a master glass maker from Limoges. The crypt is similar to the crypt of Saint Fermin in Amiens, with a statue of Fermin beside the entrance. It has a door made of Wengé wood inlaid with three Katangese crosses. The interior has a rose window that represents Saint Fermin. The left wall has a 2 by 1.8 metres (6 ft 7 in by 5 ft 11 in) azulejo mosaic from the Fábrica Sant'Anna in Lisbon. It represents the miraculous discovery of the body of Saint Fermin, surrounded by a crowd. Among the crowd there are the faces of people known to Van Brée, including craftsmen, carpenters, bishops, local authorities of Saint-Jean-de-Luz, and Firmin Van Brée himself kneeling near the saint.

In July 1959 the king of Belgium made Firmin Van Brée a knight. He died on 26 March 1960 in Saint-Jean-de-Luz. He is buried in the crypt there.

== Sources ==
- Archives de Firmin Van Bree (in French), UCLouvain
- Cassis, Youssef (2002), Finance and Financiers in European History 1880-1960, Cambridge University Press, ISBN 9780521893732
- "Crypt of Van Bree, a famous Belgium Industrialist", Minube
- Druelle, Clotilde (2019), Feeding Occupied France during World War I: Herbert Hoover and the Blockade, Springer, ISBN 9783030055639
- Farrell-Robert, Janine (2007), Glitter & Greed: The Secret World of the Diamond Cartel (revised ed.), Red Wheel Weiser, ISBN 9781609258801
- Horn, Max, The Belgian Congo in the War, New York: Belgian Information Center
- Miller-La Cerda, Anne de (4 March 2021), "Saint-Jean-de-Luz : la chapelle du Chevalier Firmin Van Bree", BasKulture (in French)
- Van der Straeten, E. (9 October 1970), "BREE (van) (Firmin)", Biographie Belge d'Outre-Mer, vol. VII–A, Académie Royale des Sciences d'Outre-Mer
- Williams, Susan (2018), Spies in the Congo: The Race for the Ore that Built the Atomic Bomb, Oxford University Press, ISBN 9781787380653
