= Alexis Bertrand =

Alexis Félicien Bertrand

Interim Deputy-governor general of Orientale Province
- In office July 1916 – August 1917
- Preceded by: Justin Malfeyt
- Succeeded by: Adolphe de Meulemeester

Personal details
- Born: 25 May 1870 Uccle, Belgium
- Died: 20 September 1946 (aged 76) Uccle, Belgium
- Occupation: Soldier, colonial administrator

Alexis Félicien Bertrand (25 May 1870 – 20 September 1946) was a Belgian soldier and senior colonial administrator. He left the colonial service in 1918 after falling out with his superiors, and later became known as a vocal critic of the brutal treatment of the Congolese workers.

== Life ==
Alexis Félicien Bertrand was born in Uccle on 25 May 1870. His family was prosperous. His father was Alexis Joseph Bertrand (1840-1923), a senior civil servant in the state railway administration who served as burgomaster of La Hulpe from 1912 to 1921. His mother was Christine Jadot (1841-1911), aunt of Jean Jadot, Lambert Jadot and Odon Jadot, each of whom later had distinguished careers as engineers and colonial businessmen.

== Military career ==
Bertrand entered the Royal Military School in 1888. As a lieutenant, he joined the colonial service of the Congo Free State on 21 August 1897. He spent his first term in the Congo from 1897 to 1901, mostly in the northeast region, and in the Lado Enclave in particular. He returned to the Congo in 1902–1905, 1906–1909, 1909–1912 and 1913–1917. He was a district commissioner in Ubangi District, then in Équateur District and Uélé District. In 1910 he became commissioner general, and in 1913 permanent inspector in Uélé. He became deputy to the deputy-governor general of the Orientale Province.

In 1911 Sir Arthur Hardinge described him as "a dedicated 'humanitarian' and strongly–perhaps too strongly–'pro-native'". In January 1914 Bertrand wrote of "caravans ... composed of women, sometimes carrying children, who travel distances of over 50km" to bring provisions to the Kanua mining camps of Forminière. He reported that at least half their pay was in salt or trade goods of trifling value and at rates one-third below the going rate. In 1915–1916 Bertrand was responsible for logistics for the Belgian troops fighting the Germans in East Africa. Bertrand was interim vice-governor general of the Orientale Province after Justin Malfeyt left in July 1916, handing over to Adolphe de Meulemeester in August 1917.

In his private correspondence and his official reports Bertrand criticized the brutal treatment of the African workers, often forced to work and severely mistreated in places such as the Kilo-Moto gold mines. He was concerned about the real or potential decline in the population, and attacked what he saw as the inadequate "indigenous policy" of the colonial authorities. He fell out with the governor general, Eugène Henry, and left the Congo at the end of 1917. On 1 March 1918 he formally left the colonial service. On 27 March 1918 he was promoted to colonel, as was normal for an officer seconded to the colonial service. He became an army pensioner on 22 September 1919 at the age of 49.

== Later career ==
In 1920 Bertrand began working on manpower policy for Forminière, a powerful colonial company that was very active in the Kasaï region. His first cousin Jean Jadot was the chairman. Forminière was notable for its opposition to forced recruitment of African workers. In 1921 Bertrand became president of the Kasaï Labor Exchange, and in 1927 he became president of the Katanga Labor Exchange. These two private organizations, sanctioned by the authorities, regulated recruitment of Congolese workers by European employers. Betrand became known as an expert on the Congo in some official and political circles. In 1922 the House of Representatives elected Bertrand as a member of the Colonial Council, a position he held until the end of his life. In 1924 he reported on the Congolese workforce to the Belgian Colonial Congress. He became a member of the Commission for the Study of Manpower in the Belgian Congo in 1924. He became an associate member of the Royal Belgian Colonial Institute in 1930, and a full member in 1931.

In 1930 a labor commission under Major Alphonse Cayen (Note: Major Alphonse Cayen was a member of the Committee of Experts on Native Labour. He was Director of the International Forestry and Mining Company of the Congo (Forminière) and Reporter-General of the Advisory Committee on Labour in the Belgian Congo.) was appointed after missionaries had complained about the effect of rapid economic development on African Societies. The commission made field investigations in 1931-32 and issued reports on each of the four provinces, and a general report. Bertrand wrote the report on the Orientale Province, which was much the most detailed and seems to have had a strong influence on the overall recommendations in the general report. A basic assumption, as in other reports, was that the Africans were a resource like wild animals. Quotas had to be set and enforced on how many Africans could be recruited so the general population could be maintained at a healthy level. Betrand wrote a 1932 report that strongly criticized the practices at the Kilo-Moto gold mines, leading to a heated argument with General Georges Moulaert, the head of the company and an influential person in the colonial establishment. Bertrand became increasingly viewed as a gadfly for his criticism.

In 1939 Bertrand married Jeanne Tercafs, a young sculptor 28 years younger than him, who received artistic grants for several trips to the Mangbetu country in the Congo between 1935 and 1940. Bertrand was also interested in African arts, and was a member of the commission for the protection of indigenous arts and crafts, which had been created in 1935. He presented the work of his future wife, Jeanne Tercafs, to the Royal Colonial Institute from 1937.

During World War II Bertrand was among those Belgians who considered that German victory was inevitable, and they should make the best they could of the new situation. As a result, he associated himself with leaders of the Kolonialpolitisches Amt, the colonial service of the Nazi Party. His wife died prematurely in 1944. After the liberation of Belgium he was investigated and then charged in July 1945, although he was not arrested. He resigned from his position at the Royal Colonial Institute. He died in Uccle on 20 September 1946, the day after leaving the Colonial Council.

== Sources ==
- Northrup, David (1988), Beyond the bend in the river : African labor in eastern Zaire, 1865-1940, Boston College Libraries, ISBN 9780896801516
- The Recruiting of Labour in Colonies and in Other Territories, Geneva: International Labour Conference, 1935
- Vanthemsche, Guy (19 November 2019), "BERTRAND (Alexis Félicien)", Biographie Belge D'Outre-mer, Academie Royale des Sciences D'Outremer – via RAOS
