= Joseph Mbuyi =

Congolese politician

Minister of Middle Classes of the Republic of the Congo
- In office 24 June 1960 – September 1960

Personal details
- Born: 12 August 1929 Mikalaye, Luluabourg, Belgian Congo
- Died: 1960/1961 near Charlesville, Republic of the Congo
- Party: Mouvement National Congolais-Lumumba

Joseph Mbuyi (12 August 1929 – 1960/1961) was a Congolese politician. He served as the Minister of Middle Classes of the Republic of the Congo (now the Democratic Republic of the Congo) in 1960.

== Biography ==
Joseph Mbuyi was born on 12 August 1929 in Mikalaye, Luluabourg, Belgian Congo.

Mbuyi joined the Mouvement National Congolais (MNC), and when the party split he joined Patrice Lumumba's wing and became the secretary of its national committee. He initially attended the 1960 Belgo-Congolese Round Table Conference in Brussels as a delegate for the MNC-Lumumba. He was replaced and left in early February before the conference ended and returned to Léopoldville. He served as Minister of Middle Classes in Lumumba's government, which was officially invested by Parliament on 24 June 1960. The government planned on eventually making him the Congo's first ambassador to the United States. On 22 July Lumumba left the Congo for New York City. Mbuyi accompanied him as part of a special economic delegation. Belgian Ambassador to the Congo Jean van den Bosch established a confidential line of contact with Mbuyi, since he was regarded as more politically moderate than some other members of the government. Throughout August Lumumba increasingly withdrew from his full cabinet and instead consulted officials and ministers he trusted, including Mbuyi.

On 5 September President Joseph Kasa-Vubu announced the dismissal of Lumumba, along with several of his ministers and declared that a new government would be formed. A political deadlock ensued, and on 14 September, Colonel Joseph-Désiré Mobutu launched a coup to install his own government. Lumumba then began planning to relocate to Stanleyville in the east to reestablish his government. Mbuyi attempted to go but was killed in the Charlesville region in 1960 or 1961.
