= MIBA Aviation =

Cargo airline of the Democratic Republic of the Congo

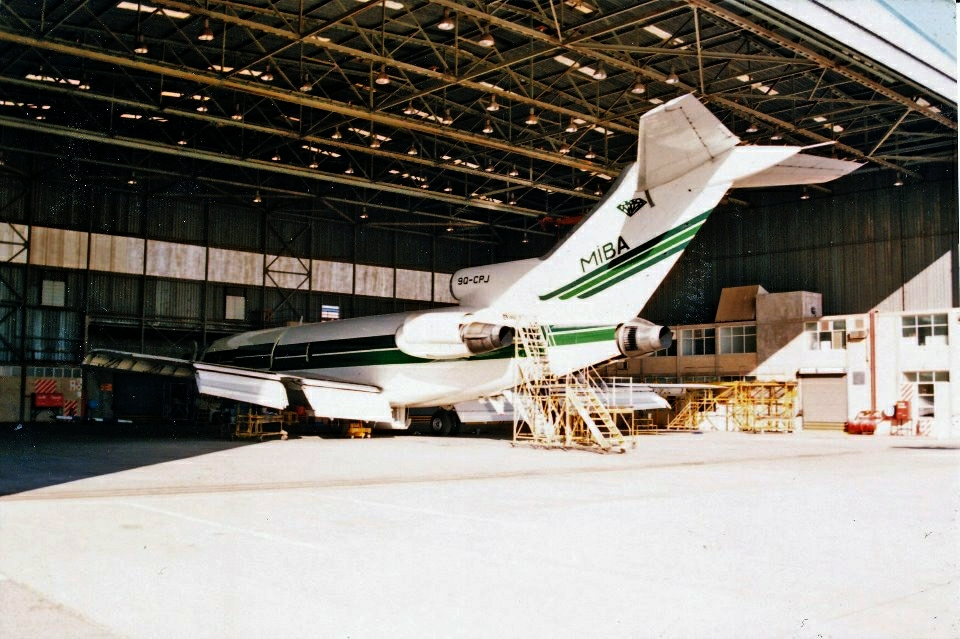
IATA	ICAO	Call sign
-	-	-
- Founded: 1994
- Ceased operations: late 2005
- Fleet size: 1
- Headquarters: Mbuji-Mayi, Democratic Republic of the Congo

MIBA Aviation was a cargo airline based in the Democratic Republic of the Congo. It was established and started operations in 1994 and was an ad hoc and charter cargo operator. The airline operated the Boeing 727 but ceased to exist in 2005 after a Boeing 727 of the airline was written off. The airline also operated a Hawker Siddeley HS 125.

The airline was a subsidiary of the mining company Société Minière de Bakwanga. Its sole HS 125 would later go on to the airline Forrest Aviation which would later be impounded in Lanseria.

== Fleet ==
The MIBA Aviation fleet included the following aircraft in April 2008:

- 1 Boeing 727-100F

== Accident ==
A MIBA Boeing 727 crashed in October of 2005 and was written off

== See also ==
- Transport in the Democratic Republic of the Congo
