= Lambert Jadot =

Belgian civil engineer and executive

Lambert Paul Jadot
- Born: 21 December 1875; On-lez-Jemelle, Marche-en-Famenne, Wallonia, Belgium
- Died: 17 December 1967 (aged 91); Brussels, Belgium
- Occupations: Civil engineer, executive
- Known for: Katanga railroads

Lambert Paul Jadot (/ʒəˈdoʊ/ zhə-DOH, French: [lɑ̃bɛʁ ʒado]; 21 December 1875 – 17 December 1967) was a Belgian civil engineer and executive who was active in railways, mining and other enterprises in China, Canada and the Belgian Congo during the colonial era.

== Family ==
Lambert Paul Jadot was born on 21 December 1875 in On-lez-Jemelle, Marche-en-Famenne, Wallonia, Belgium. His parents were Jean Baptiste Jadot (1839–1887), an entrepreneur and merchant who became mayor of On-lez-Jemelle, and Marie Elise Cousin (1841–1922). His brother, Jean Jadot (1862–1932) was an engineer and pioneer of railway construction in China, Egypt and the Belgian Congo. (Note: The town of Jadotville (now Likasi) in the Congo was named after Jean Jadot until 1960.) His cousin Alexis Bertrand (1870–1946) became a senior colonial official. Jean Baptiste Jadot died prematurely in 1887, and his oldest son Jean assumed parental responsibility for his brothers Jules and Lambert, 11 and 13 years younger than him, who both also became engineers.

== Far East ==
Jean Jadot moved to China in 1898 to direct construction of the Beijing–Hankou railway. Émile Francqui returned to China in 1901 to negotiate resumption of the Kaiping coal mines for his Compagnie Internationale d'Orient. He hired Lambert Jadot as his assistant to make initial technical studies for draft contracts. Lambert Jadot reached Shanghai at the end of April 1901. His first task was to study the Hanyang factories. Their owner, Sheng, wanted to entrust management to a European company. Lambert completed his study in August 1901 to the great satisfaction of Francqui and Sheng. Sheng proposed that Jean Jadot take over general management of Hanyang, and when he refused proposed that Lambert Jadot take the job under the control of his older brother, but Jean would not accept this either.

Jadot undertook several mission in Korea and Japan, gaining the full confidence of Francqui, and as Jean Jadot's brother was respected in Chinese circles. In April 1904 Lambert Jadot became general manager of the company created to operate the Tianjin tramway concession, and began the construction work, which was completed in 1906. He later returned to Europe, then in 1909 was appointed managing director of the Tianjin Tramways and Lighting Company (Compagnie des Tramways et de l’Eclairage de Tientsin). He would soon become involved in Belgian enterprises in Canada and the Congo. The Belgo-Canadian Pulp and Paper Company, based in Brussels, was founded on 6 October 1900 to manufacture wood pulp and paper. In 1913 the president was Georges de Laveleye. Lambert Jadot was a member of the board representing the Société Générale for its enterprises in Canada. As of 1918 he was also still involved with the Belgo Canadian Pulp & Paper Co.

== Congo ==
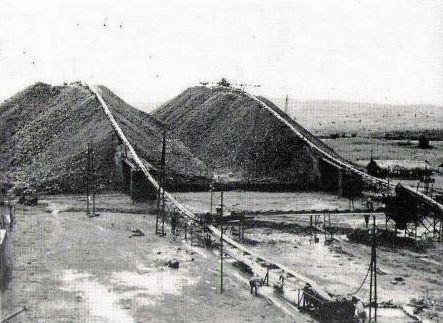
Slag heaps at a diamond mine in Bakwanga, Kasai

Lambert Jadot became managing director of the Compagnie du chemin de fer du bas-Congo au Katanga (BCK) shortly before World War I (1914–1918). In 1916 he founded and became first president of the Association des intérêts coloniaux belges (AICB), a lobby group for private enterprises in the Congo. During the war he oversaw an expansion of the BCK rail network in Katanga. In 1919 the line from Elisabethville (Lubumbashi) reached Bukama, the head of navigation on the Lualaba River. In 1921 the minister Louis Franck obtained permission from parliament to start work on a one-stop rail / river link running northwest from Bukama to Léopoldville, the project that Lambert's cousin Odon Jadot had abandoned in 1914. Odon Jadot was charged by Lambert Jadot with resuming this project.

Jadot was an administrator of the Union Minière du Haut-Katanga (UMHK) from 1932 to 1946. As of 1936 Lambert Jadot was president of the Compagnie de Chemin de fer du Katanga (CFK), while Odon Jadot was administrative director. In 1937 Lambert was succeeded as administrative director of the BCK by his nephew Paul Gillet (1891–1964).

Diamant Boart, a subsidiary of Union Minière du Haut-Katanga, was founded on 3 February 1937 to manufacture diamond-tipped grinding machines, chaired by Lambert Jadot. (Note: Boart is a diamond that is not suitable for jewelry due to its color and crystallization.) Its initial capital of 5 million francs was soon increased to 150 million francs. During the 1950s it created subsidiaries in France, Italy and Canada. In 1954 Jadot was managing director of the Société minière du Bécéka. Directors included Odon Jadot and Pierre Jadot. In 1954 the Bécéka diamond mining concession in the Bakwanga area produced 60% by weight of the world's supply of all types of diamond, and provided almost the entire supply of crushing bort for the United States. As of 1960 Jadot was an honorary advisor of the Société Générale de Belgique.

== Home life ==
Lambert married Gabrielle Flanneau (1888–1972) on 26 January 1909. Gabrielle was the daughter of the architect Octave Flanneau. Their son Jean Jadot (born 1909) became director of the Pontifical Mission Societies. Other children included Françoise (1912–2003), Gabrielle and Noëlle (1918–2006). In 1924 Jadot bought a house in the Cygne district of Ixelles, where he lived with his family for forty years. It was a comfortable, fairly new house in the neo-Louis XV style, with pediment and stone tympanum, with a stable, saddlery and greenhouses. (Note: The house at Rue du Bourgmestre 15, named the Hôtel Edmond Canonne after its first owner Edmond Canonne, was built in 1914. From 1984 the Hôtel Edmond Canonne was occupied by the Musée des Enfants. It was designated classé on 18 February 2016.) He had an annex facing the street added to the main building in 1931–32.

Lambert Jadot died on 17 December 1967 in Brussels at the age of 91. He is buried beside his wife in the cemetery of Ixelles.

== Sources ==
- "Belgian Congo (1)", World Survey of Foreign Railways, United States. Foreign and Domestic Commerce Bureau, 25 September 1936
- Brion, R.; Moreau, J.-L (2007), "Jadot (Odon)", Biographie Belge d'Outre-Mer, vol. IX, Acad. Roy. Science d'Outre-Mer, pp. col.204–210
- Cassiman, Ruben (2011), L'association des Intérêts Coloniaux Belges. Over de Relatie Tussen Bedrijfswereld en Koloniaal Bestuur in Belgisch Congo (1940-1960) (PDF) (thesis) (in Dutch)
- Composition du Conseil d'Administration de la Société Générale de Belgique (PDF) (in French)
- "Diamant Boart S.A.", Les archives de l'État en Belgique
- "Hôtel Edmond Canonne", Région de Bruxelles-Capitale INVENTAIRE DU PATRIMOINE ARCHITECTURAL (in French)
- Jean Jadot, the engineer banker, Source d'Histoire, 2021
- Jonge d'Ardoye, Yves de; De Cloedt, Marinette; Van Gossum, Paul, À la découverte de l'histoire d'Ixelles (PDF) (in French), Ixelles Elsene
- Kurgan-Van Hentenryk, G. (1965), JEAN JADOT Artisan de l'expansion belge en Chine (PDF) (in French), Brussels: Acad. Roy. Science d'Outre-Mer
- Kurgan-van Hentenryk, Ginette (2005), "GILLET, Paul, Louis, Jean, Joseph" (PDF), Biographie Belge d'Outre-Mer (in French), vol. 8, Acad. Roy. Science d'Outre-Mer
- Les dirigeants de la société UMHK depuis sa création (1906 - 1956) (in French)
- Murdock, Thomas G. (June 1955), "Bécéka's Industrial Diamond Mining Operations at Bakwanga", Mineral Trade Notes, Supplement No. 46, United States Department of the Interior Bureau of Mines
- Pierfit, "Lambert JADOT", Geneanet
- Recapitulation of transactions for year 1918, United States. Congress. Senate. Special Committee to Investigate the Munitions Industry, 1934
- "The Belgo-Canadian Pulp and Paper Company", Journal d'Ypres (in French): 3, 24 May 1913
- Vanthemsche, Guy (19 November 2019), "BERTRAND (Alexis Félicien)", Biographie Belge D'Outre-mer, Academie Royale des Sciences D'Outremer – via RAOS
