= Djokupunda =

Coordinates: 5.451105°S 20.970154°E

Djokupunda, also spelt Djoko Punda and known in colonial times as Charlesville, is a small town in Kasai province of the Democratic Republic of the Congo. A Mennonite mission of the Congo Inland Mission was founded there in 1912 and became a centre for establishing further missions in the region. The town is close to the upper Kasai River, at the limit of navigation on that river, and is connected by dirt tracks to Luebo, 64 km east-north-east and Tshikapa, 150 km south. Djokupunda has schools and health clinics but no paved roads and no facilities for travellers. Until 1955, the Forminière company operated a 600 mm railway more or less along the river Kasai, South to Makumbi.
