= André Pavlovsky =

French architect (1891–1961)

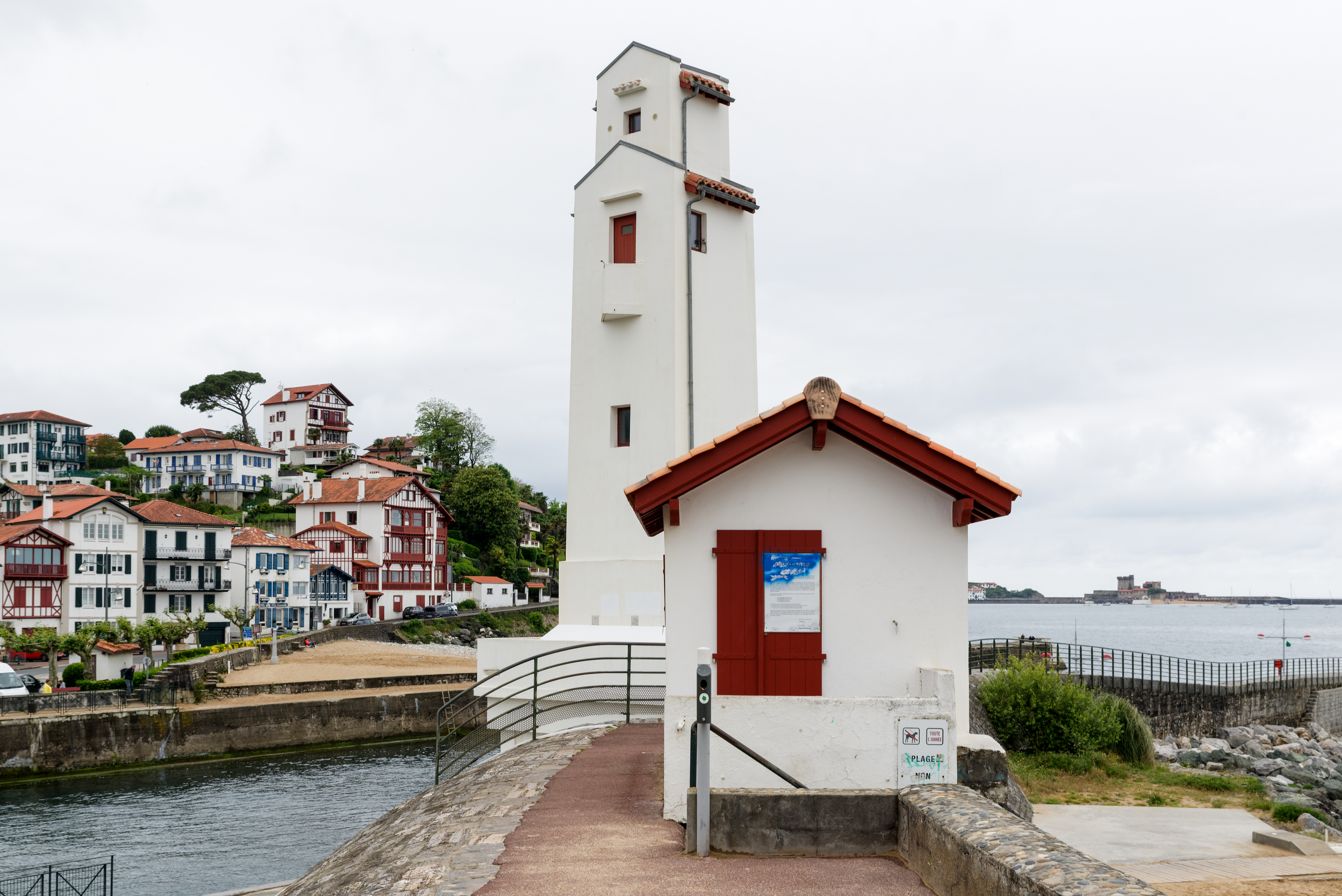
- Lighthouse in Saint-Jean-de-Luz
- Born: 7 September 1891; Paris, France
- Died: 12 February 1961 (aged 69); Saint-Jean-de-Luz, France
- Occupation: Architect

André Pavlovsky (7 September 1891 – 12 February 1961) was a French architect.

== Life ==
André Pavlovsky was born in the 17th arrondissement of Paris on 7 September 1891. His parents were exiled in France for their opposition to the Tsarist regime. His father, Isaac Pavlovski, was a journalist and his mother, Theodosia Vassilievna Vandacourova, was a dental surgeon. André Pavlovsky, after secondary studies at the Lycée Carnot in Paris, joined the architecture section (Chifflot studio) of the Beaux-Arts de Paris.

In 1915 Pavlovsky and his brothers Nicolas and Jean joined the Legion of Russian Volunteers to fight alongside French troops. He was a driver in the service of the “Russian Ambulances to the French Armies” of Tsarina Alexandra Fedorovna of Russia. Subsequently, he became an artillery lieutenant, an observer on board biplanes flying over the front.

At the end of the war, in 1918, he continued his studies of architecture. After obtaining his diploma he worked with his friend Louis Quételart in reconstruction of the cities of Méteren and Vieille-Chapelle in the North of France.

In 1925 he settled on the Basque coast in Saint-Jean-de-Luz where he married Yvonne Longi in 1930. The couple had three children: Claude-Marie, Marc and Jacques.

In this region with its strong Basque identity, he tried to free himself from tradition without forgetting the past. He first joined the neo-Basque movement whose leader was the architect Henri Godbarge, then favored more modernist compositions. He refused to concede to the picturesque, stayed away from fashion and gave himself freedom of interpretation. The wealthy and cosmopolitan clientele that frequented Biarritz and Saint-Jean-de-Luz was receptive to his innovation. Very much in demand, Pavlovsky built many villas, including the Villa Zortziko for the violinist Jacques Thibaud, the villas San Firmin, Santa Barbara and Los Escudos for Firmin van Bree, and Lacostenia for René and Simone Lacoste.

From 1932, André Pavlovsky was the departmental architect of the Basses-Pyrénées for the district of Bayonne.

During the World War II he joined the French Liberation Army in North Africa, landed in Provence and took part in the Western Allied invasion of Germany.

Upon his return, there was less demand for large houses. He built public buildings and apartment buildings, created, in collaboration with Firmin van Bree, the Motels Basques, luxurious apartments inspired by American hotel structures. He devoted part of his time to photography, his second passion. From 1946 to 1961, he chaired the Regional Council of the Order of Architects for the Arrondissement of Pau.

He died on 12 February 1961 in Saint-Jean-de-Luz. On the 15 September 2007, on the occasion of Heritage Days, the mayor of Saint-Jean-de-Luz, Peyuco Duhart, inaugurated a heritage plaque, affixed in front of the town's lighthouse, in his memory.

== Principal works ==
- School, town hall and church of Méteren with Louis Quételart, 1920-1927
- Church of Vieille-Chapelle with Louis Quételart, 1925
- Redevelopment of the Villa Andaluccia, built by Charles Siclis, avenue du Parc d'Hiver, Biarritz, 1925
- Villa Zortziko, 1926
- Villa l'Ayguette, avenue du doctor Claisse, Biarritz, 1926
- Villa La Chozita, 1927
- Villas Etche Soua, Gaïneko, Artea, Lacostenia and Yoko Erdian around the Chantaco golf course, 1929
- Villa Meridiana, Lachepaillet district Bayonne, 1933
- Reconstruction of the spire and repair of the bell tower of the Saint-Pierre parish church in Uhart-Mixe, 1935-1937
- The two lighthouses at the entrance to the port of Saint-Jean-de-Luz and Ciboure, 1936,
- Maison Orenetchea
- Villa Mugalde, road from Dancharia to Urrugne, 1938
- Villa Atlanta in Saint-Jean-de-Luz, 1949
- Chapel de Socoa, 76 chemin de Bizargorra à Urrugne, 1955

== Awards ==
André Pavlovsky was a reserve lieutenant-colonel, decorated with the 1939–1945 war cross, president of the regional council of the order architects and member of the Rotary Club.

- Chevalier des Arts et des Lettres
- Médaille des Évadés (1946)
- Chevalier de la Légion d'honneur (1950)
