= Société Minière du Bécéka =

Former mining company in Congo

The Société Minière du Bécéka, also known as Mibéka, was a Belgian colonial company founded in 1919 to manage the mining concessions of the territory of the Compagnie du chemin de fer du Bas-Congo au Katanga (itself known as BCK or Bécéka). In the post-World War II period, Mibéka was the largest diamond producer in the world by volume, albeit overwhelmingly extracting industrial diamonds and bort. Until the end of 1960 it did not operate its mines directly, but contracted out their operation to the Forminière, a related company of the loose group of entities controlled by the Société Générale de Belgique.

Upon Congolese independence in mid-1960, Mibéka was involved in the turmoil of secessionist South Kasai, in the course of which it terminated its contract with Forminière and formed a Congolese subsidiary, the Société Minière de Bakwanga, or Miba. Miba took over all Mibéka's Congolese mining operations, centered on the eponymous city of Bakwanga, renamed Mbuji-Mayi in 1963. Meanwhile Mibéka rebranded itself in 1962 as the Société d'Entreprises et d'Investissements du Bécéka, in shorthand Sibéka.

Sibéka, based in Brussels, remained active for decades with investments mostly in Congo/Zaire and in Belgium. It was eventually liquidated in late 2023.

== Creation and colonial era ==
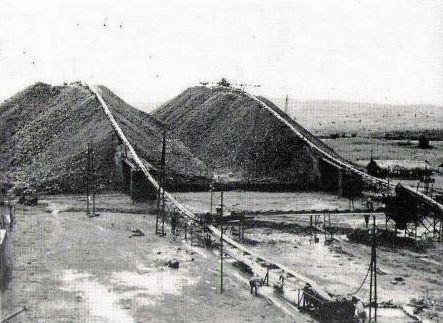
Diamond mining slag heaps in Bakwanga, Kasai, 1950

In May 1916 George Young, a Scottish geologist employed by the Compagnie du chemin de fer du bas-Congo au Katanga (BCK), discovered a diamond in the Lulua River basin in the area covered by the BCK concession, and in August 1918 his team found diamonds at the Lukilenge location by the Mbuji-Mayi River, northeast of the town of Bakwanga. The Société minière du Bécéka (referred to by the shorthand Mibéka, sometimes also simply as Bécéka) was founded in 1919 with the specific purpose of exploiting the mineral riches in the Bakwanga area. The Société Générale de Belgique (SGB) held a controlling stake in Mibéka from the start. Mibéka owned the BCK concession's mining rights, but contracted out the operation to the Belgian government-controlled Forminière, which already had experience in diamond mining in the Kasai District, by agreement of 28 January 1920.

At the start, the mining production centered on the Lulua River basin, but its center of gravity soon moved east to the Mbuji-Mayi River basin upstream from its confluence with the Lubilash. The latter zone, known as the Mibéka's "Lubilash Sector", surpassed the "Lulua Sector" in diamond extraction volume already in 1924. In 1925, a major diamond-extraction site was identified at Bakwanga Hill, which subsequently became the core of the Mibéka's operations. Also in 1925, Mibéka formed a three-way agricultural joint venture together with the BCK and Forminière, the Société d'Élevage et de Culture au Congo (S.E.C.).

In the 1930s, Mibéka developed a strategic partnership with the Anglo American group controlled by Ernest Oppenheimer. In 1936, the Anglo American Corporation of South Africa Ltd, via its London-based intermediate holding company Anglo American Investment Trust Ltd, took a 16.6 percent stake in Mibéka, partly by acquiring a block of shares sold by the SGB-affiliated Banque de l'Union Parisienne. In February 1937, the Oppenheimer Group and Mibéka together formed a Brussels-based precision-tools manufacturing venture, Diamant Boart, in which Mibéka held a 80-percent stake with intent to expand the market for industrial diamonds. In 1957, Anglo American transferred its ownership stake in Mibéka to the Kimberley-based Diamond Corporation Ltd, an investment subsidiary established in 1930 by the Oppenheimer-controlled De Beers, which simultaneously acquired additional shares and raised its stake to 19.1 percent. The partnership between Mibéka and its successor Sibéka with De Beers would last until the early 2000s.

In 1946, geologists located the kimberlite pipes that were the original source of the Bakwanga diamonds. Nine of the ten pipes in the Mbuji Mayi cluster were located within the "Polygon" mining license owned by Mibéka. In 1956, Mibéka also discovered the Tshibwe cluster of kimberlite pipes, and mined these for a while. In 1950, Mibéka separately established Bécéka-Manganèse, a subsidiary that mined manganese in the Dilolo region (south of Kasai).

In the 1950s, it was estimated that the city of Bakwanga and its surrounding area had the world's most important deposit of diamonds, with at least 300 million karats. While about 95% of the diamonds found near Bakwanga were relatively low value bort, the grade was very high and relatively cheap to mine. In 1959, the last full year before Congolese independence, Forminière extracted 14.1 million karats of diamonds for Mibéka.

== Congo Crisis ==
On 23 June 1960, days ahead of Congo's independence, the Société Minière du Bécéka decided to relocate its place of registration from Bakwanga to Brussels, and to form a fully-owned subsidiary in the newly sovereign country to which it would transfer its local assets and operations.

On 27 August 1960, the Bakwanga mine was temporarily closed due to the invasion of South Kasai, and its head Gérard Cravatte was briefly detained by Congolese forces loyal to the central government led by Patrice Lumumba. It reopened in October. On 1 January 1961, Mibéka took over direct management of the mine from Forminière. 1961 set a record production rate, with 18 million karats of diamonds. During that year, Mibéka paid about $12 million in taxes and royalties to the secessionist regime of Albert Kalonji in South Kasai, which had authority over its area of operations. Also in 1961, Kalonji decreed that the local population would have the right to engage in artisanal diamond mining, thus effectively terminating Mibéka's extraction monopoly.

On 13 December 1961, Mibéka finally formed its Congolese subsidiary named the Société Minière de Bakwanga, in shorthand Miba. From then on, Miba operated the mines in Congo, while Mibéka provided management and expertise from Brussels. On 31 January 1962, Bécéka-Manganèse, which like Mibéka had opted for registration in Brussels in June 1960, similarly formed a Congolese subsidiary, the Société Minière de Kisenge. The name change from Mibéka to Sibéka, a few months later on 21 March 1962, reflected the new division of roles. Also in 1962, Miba terminated its mining activity in its western ("Lulua") sector.

== Mobutu Era ==
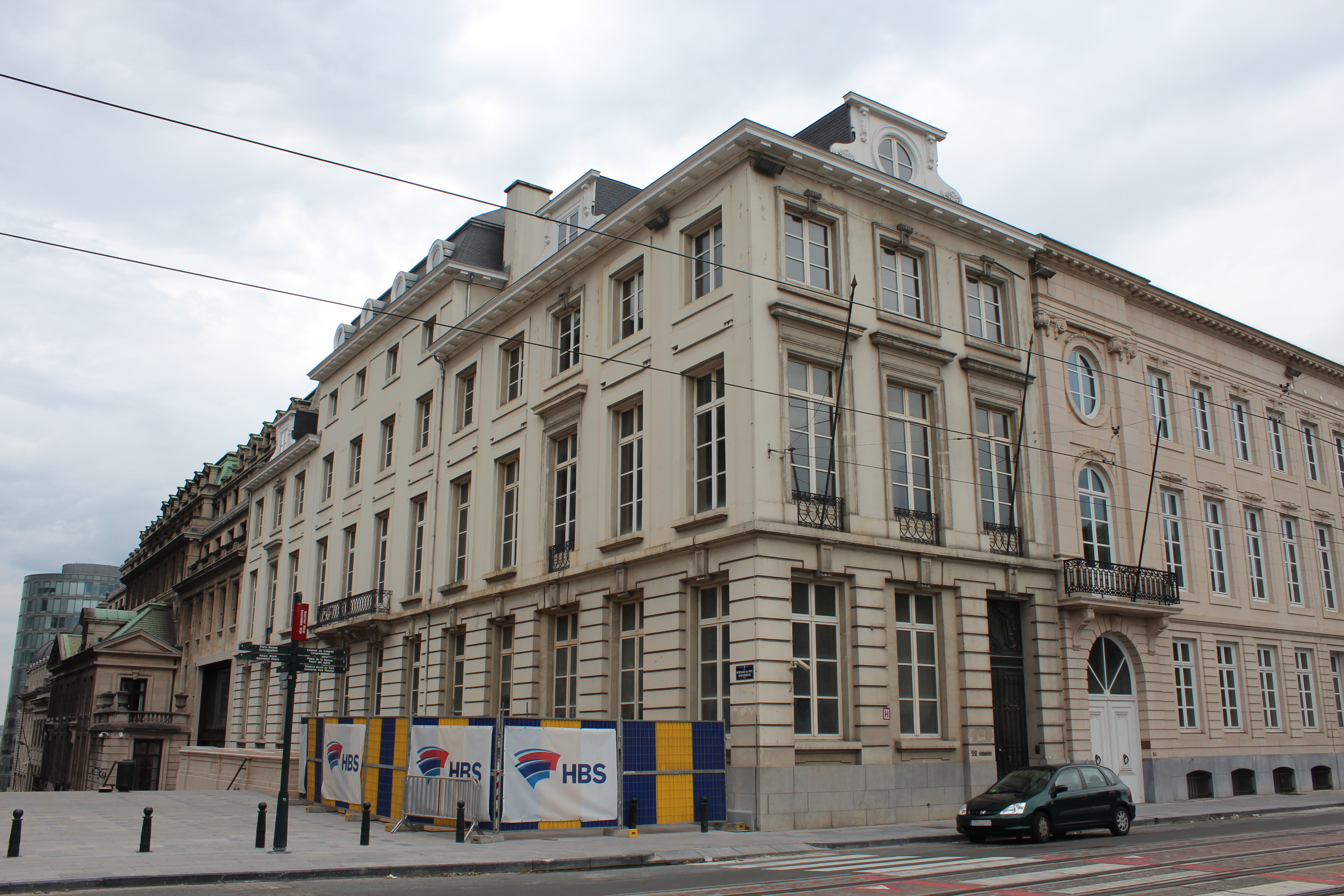
Building at Rue Royale 52 in Brussels, head office of Sibéka from the late 1960s to the early 2000s

Mibéka had a longstanding association with the group of companies controlled by the Oppenheimer family, which had been among its shareholders since its inception and in which it also held a minority interest by the 1960s. Oppenheimer-controlled De Beers still held a 20-percent stake in Mibéka, and was involved in the marketing of its diamonds. In 1967, following changes in Congolese labor legislation, all remaining Sibéka employees in Congo were transferred to the payroll of Miba. That same year, Miba transferred the task of selling its diamonds from Sibéka to an affiliate of De Beers, British Congo Diamond Distributors Ltd. De Beers's marketing and distribution arm, the Central Selling Organisation, simultaneously opened an office in Kinshasa.

In 1969, in exchange for new mining rights, the Congolese state took a 50 percent equity stake in Miba, while Sibéka retained the other half. On 30 November 1973, the authorities of the newly renamed Zaire fully nationalized Miba. By then, Sibéka had no remaining interest in Miba. Mobutu then returned a 20-percent ownership stake to Sibéka, by agreement of 22 May 1978 which also stipulated that the Zairian authorities would appoint 5 members, and Sibéka 3 members, of Miba's board of directors. The agreement gave Zaire a right of first refusal which resulted in Sibéka retaining the 20-percent minority stake in Miba until its liquidation 45 years later. In 1989, the number of members of Miba's board of directors was reduced from eight to seven, with only two still appointed by Sibéka. Meanwhile, Bécéka-Manganèse was wound up on 27 December 1983, with its residual assets and liabilities taken over by Sibéka.

The ownership structure of Sibéka subsequently evolved. In 1990, the SGB sold its stake (by then 54.4 percent) in Sibéka to Union Minière, in which the SGB itself held a 82-percent majority stake. In 1998, Union Minière delisted Sibéka through an exchange offer by which it raised its ownership stake to 80 percent, while De Beers retained its 20-percent interest. By then, Sibeka still owned Entrinvest, the former Société d'Élevage et de Culture au Congo Belge which had been established by Forminière in 1925, as well as non-Congo-related investments. Entrinvest ceased activity in 2001.

== Later developments ==
The First Congo War disrupted Miba and thus also affected Sibéka. In 1997, the AFDL forces led by Laurent-Désiré Kabila took over the Kasai region where Miba had its head office and main operations. In March 1997, the ADFL ended De Beers's monopoly on marketing Miba's production.

In 1999, Sibéka sold its precision-tools subsidiary Diamant Boart, of which it owned all shares by then. Diamant Boart was eventually acquired by Husqvarna Group in 2002, and its brand was phased out twenty years later.

Union Minière, which renamed itself in 2001 as Umicore, eventually decided to part ways with Miba. In 2005, Umicore took over from Sibeka its stake in Element Six Abrasives (previously known as Megapode, and based in Ireland), a joint venture with Element Six producing synthetic industrial diamonds. Around the same time, Sibeka sold Royale 52, a property company that owned its head office building in Brussels, to Générale de Banque. As a result, Sibeka became an empty shell aside from its 20 percent stake in Miba.

As it could not sell Sibéka's 20 percent stake under the terms of the 1978 agreement, Umicore opted to sell Sibéka altogether after having bought out De Beers's minority stake. Thus in 2006, Sibéka was acquired by Mwana Africa, an entity then controlled by Kasai businessman Kalaa Katema Mpinga. Sibéka subsequently relocated its Brussels head office, which in previous years had been hosted by Umicore at Broekstraat 31, to new premises at Place du Champ de Mars 5. In 2012, China International Mining Group Corporation (CIMGC, a Cayman Islands entity associated with Hong Kong businessman Yat Hoi Ning) became a shareholder of Mwana Africa, which in 2015 rebranded itself as Asa Resources Group, by then controlled by CIMGC.

By 2023, Sibéka, still controlled by CIMGC via Asa Resources Goroup, was found in breach of its obligations under Belgian law. In December 2023, it was placed into liquidation by the Belgian judicial authorities.

== Leadership ==
- Jean Jadot, chairman (président) 1919-1932
- Lambert Jadot, CEO (administrateur délégué) 1919-1959
- Alexandre Galopin, chairman 1932-1944
- Gaston Blaise, chairman 1944-1960
- Gérard Cravatte, CEO 1959-1967
- Gérard Haveaux, CEO 1967-1969
- Bruno Morelli, CEO ca. 1971-1997
- Étienne Davignon, chairman ca. 1997-2006
- Etienne Denis, CEO 1997-2008

== Production statistics (1925-1953) ==
These are, until 1953, from the United States Bureau of Mines, and after that date, from Mibéka's reports to shareholders.

Mibéka diamond production
Year	Production (carats)	Fraction of World Production
1925	579,888	12.3%
1926	771,358	12.4%
1927	655,373	8.2%
1928	1,232,029	15.4%
1929	1,407,095	17.8%
1930	1,969,332	25.5%
1931	2,885,601	40.8%
1932	3,189,014	52.6%
1933	1,736,465	45.6%
1934	2,727,939	49.5%
1935	2,377,069	31.0%
1936	3,836,324	46.0%
1937	4,120,918	39.6%
1938	6,435,362	55.0%
1939	7,556,848	58.8%
1940	8,870,142	68.0%
1941	5,188,310	57.0%
1942	5,402,457	56.3%
1943	4,393,316	50.5%
1944	7,037,227	59.8%
1945	9,863,086	68.6%
1946	5,520,146	54.5%
1947	4,933,767	50.6%
1948	5,273,752	51.0%
1949	9,099,472	63.8%
1950	9,604,129	63.1%
1951	10,027,065	58.9%
1952	11,025,430	59.3%
1953	12,056,057	59.7%
1954	12,050,758	
1955	12,413,198	
1956	13,383,508	
1957	15,015,816	
1958	16,004,150	
1959	14,196,261	
1960	13,046,563	
1961	18,010,568	

== See also ==
- Mining industry of the Democratic Republic of the Congo
