= Société Minière de Bakwanga =

Mining company in the Democratic Republic of the Congo

Société minière de Bakwanga SA
- Industry: Diamond mining
- Founded: 1961
- Owners: Government of the Democratic Republic of the Congo (80%)
- Website: mibardc.net

Société minière de Bakwanga, widely referred to by the shorthand MIBA, is a state-owned diamond mining company based in Mbuji-Mayi (known until 1963 as Bakwanga), Kasaï-Oriental, Democratic Republic of the Congo.

MIBA was formed in late 1961 as a Congolese subsidiary of the Brussels-based Société Minière du Bécéka (also known as Mibéka), and took over the diamond mining facilities that had been operated in the Bakwanga region until end-1960 by Forminière. It went through several episodes of disruption, and stopped production altogether in 2009-2010. Its activity since then has been a shadow of its former self.

As of 2023, 80 percent of MIBA's stock was owned by the Congolese government, with the remaining 20 percent owned by Sibéka (the former Mibéka, renamed in 1962), itself by then a Belgian subsidiary of the Chinese-controlled Asa Resources Group. Sibéka was placed into liquidation in December 2023, generating uncertainty about the future governance of MIBA.

== Establishment and early years ==
Since the establishment of the Société Minière du Bécéka (also known as Mibéka) in 1919, its mining rights in and around Bakwanga had been operated by Forminière under an outsourcing contract. In anticipation of Congolese independence on 30 June 1960, colonial companies had to opt to relocate in Belgium or stay in the newly independent country. On 23 June 1960, Mibéka opted to relocate to Brussels, whereas Forminière remained in Congo. Mibéka simultaneously decided to form a fully-owned Congolese subsidiary to which it would transfer its local assets and operations.

These plans, however, were soon disrupted by the fast-developing Congo Crisis. In early August 1960, Albert Kalonji proclaimed the independence of South Kasai. The central government responded with its invasion of South Kasai, during which the Bakwanga mine had to temporarily close on 27 August 1960. Mibéka then terminated the longstanding contract with Forminière, and took over direct operation of the Bakwanga mines on 1 January 1961. Eventually on 13 December 1961, Mibéka implemented its 1960 decision and formed MIBA with head office in Bakwanga, while Mibéka in Brussels kept MIBA's European expatriate staff on its payroll and was directly involved in the sale of MIBA's diamonds outside Congo. On 21 March 1962, Mibéka renamed itself as Société d'Entreprises et d'Investissements du Bécéka, or Sibéka.

In 1962, MIBA produced only 1.4 million karats of diamonds (almost all of them industrial diamonds), less than a tenth of its record output of 18 million karats in 1961. At that time, 4 to 6 million karats of diamonds were sourced yearly by diamond smugglers, in contrast with the pre-independence era when Belgian colonial administrators were in charge of enforcing the Forminière’s extraction monopoly. Despite the smuggling and regional turmoil, the company remained dominant in the world's diamond trade. MIBA produced 80 percent of the world's industrial diamonds and 57 percent of all diamonds in the early 1960s. However, from 1961 to 1967 nearly all of the production was exported illegally through neighboring countries, such as the Republic of Congo.

== Mobutu era (1965-1997) ==
In 1967, following changes in Congolese labor legislation, all remaining Sibéka employees in Congo were transferred to the payroll of MIBA. That same year, MIBA transferred the task of selling its diamonds from Sibéka to an affiliate of De Beers, British Congo Diamond Distributors Ltd. De Beers's marketing and distribution arm, the Central Selling Organisation, simultaneously opened an office in Kinshasa. In 1969, in exchange for new mining rights, the Congolese state took a 50 percent equity stake in MIBA. On 30 November 1973, the authorities of the newly renamed Zaire fully nationalized the MIBA. That date coincided with the start of a collapse in Miba's output, which until then had held relatively steady from its record levels of the early 1960s.

Mobutu then returned a 20-percent ownership stake to Sibéka, by agreement of 22 May 1978 which also stipulated that the Zairian authorities would appoint 5 members, and Sibéka 3 members, of MIBA's board of directors. He entered agreements with the Belgian-American businessman, Maurice Tempelsman, and together they held significant interests in MIBA. Tempelsman helped Mobutu set up a relationship with De Beers consortium, allowing the Oppenheimers to import the DRC's diamonds to London. Starting in 1967, exclusive purchasing rights for Zaïre's diamonds was given to British Diamond Distributing Ltd. (Britmond). Britmond was a subsidiary of the Central Selling Organization (CSO). However, in April 1981, Mobutu announced that the Zaïre's state-owned Société Zaïroise de Commercialisation des Minérais (Sozacom) would be taking over international marketing of the country's diamond production, ending the arrangement with Britmond. Also in 1981, Mobutu liberalized the "artisanal" extraction of diamonds by locals in Kasai, further undermining Miba's previous dominance of diamonds production in the country.

Marketing arrangements through De Beers were reëstablished in early 1983. Sozacom was dissolved in 1984, due to its tendency to divert receipts from the Zaïre treasury. In 1986, Mobutu appointed Jonas Mukamba Kadiata Nzemba as chief executive officer of MIBA. Mukamba remained in the position for more than ten years, up through the First Congo War. In 1989, the number of members of MIBA's board of directors was reduced from eight to seven, with only two still appointed by Sibéka.

In 1994, the economy of Mbuji-Mayi (as Bakwanga had been renamed in 1963) was increasingly disconnected from Mobutu's central government. Residents rejected the 1993 New Zaïre and supported opposition leader Étienne Tshisekedi. Conditions at the mine deteriorated, with production falling by more than half over five years. An employee estimated only 30% of gem quality stones reached the end of the production line, due to theft. Due to the lack of involvement from the central government, by the 1990s MIBA maintained much of the infrastructure in the city of Mbuji-Mayi, including water, electricity, roads, schools and hospitals.

== Congo Wars (1997–2003) ==
During the First Congo War in March 1997, the ascendant Alliance of Democratic Forces for the Liberation of Congo (ADFL) ended the arrangement under which De Beers had a monopoly on marketing all the production from MIBA, allowing other buyers to purchase some of MIBA's production at monthly auctions.

In February 2000, the Tshibwe cluster, an 800 square kilometer diamond mining area just south of Mbuji-Mayi in the which contained MIBA's best kimberlite deposits was transferred from MIBA to the joint venture Sengamines, an entity connected with the Zimbabwe Defence Forces. After a failed bid to float the Oryx company on the Alternative Investment Market by selling to Petra Diamonds in June 2000, Sengamines claimed it had sold off equity in the company, 49% to the Cayman Islands-based Oryx Natural Resources, controlled by Omani businessman Thamer Bin Said Ahmed Al-Shanfari, 35% for COMEX Congo, and 16% for MIBA. However, no buyout actually occurred, and the ultimate beneficiary of Oryx's stake was the Zimbabwe Defence Forces, through its subsidiary Operation Sovereign Legitimacy (OSLEG). Rather than a commercial sale, the transfer was a means for Laurent Kabila to help finance Zimbabwe's military interventions in the DRC. MIBA took back control of the Sengamines area in August 2005.

In 2000, MIBA hired a British-South African security consultant, Nigel Morgan, to work in security for the company. Morgan claimed to find irregularities in the company, including that at least five MIBA officials were engaging in stealing high value stones, and appealed to president Kabila to intervene. Morgan then left the country after receiving death threats.

In July 2000, the DRC government announced a ban on diamond exports, granting International Diamond Industries-Congo (IDI), a firm owned by Dan Gertler, an exclusive 18 month monopoly on exports from the country. However, following the assassination of Laurent Kabila, the deal was revoked in April 2001.

MIBA chairman and chief executive officer Jean-Charles Okoto was among those named in an October 2002 report from the United Nations Security Council report describing pillaging of the DRC's resources. Also in October 2002, Amnesty International reported that dozens of people were being shot every year on the MIBA concession. In response to the UN report, DRC president Joseph Kabila suspended Okoto.

== Emaxon contract and collapse (2003–2008) ==
In April 2003, Emaxon Finance International provided MIBA $15 million in financing in exchange for the right to purchase 88 percent of MIBA's diamond production. While the offtake agreement was initially signed in secret, the arrangement ended up being publicized three months later during a dispute between the Congolese minister of mines and his deputy; the previously unclear owner of Emaxon was revealed to be Dan Gertler's DGI Group.

This deal was criticized by a 2005 Congolese parliamentary commission headed by Christophe Lutundula who recommended the contract be renegotiated. The offtake agreement with Emaxon expired at the end of 2007.

At that point, Umicore (as the Union Minière had renamed itself in 2001), the owner of 80 percent of Sibéka, decided to part ways with MIBA. Sibéka could not sell its MIBA shares because of a right of first refusal clause negotiated in 1978; instead, Umicore sold Sibéka altogether in 2006 to Mwana Africa, an entity then controlled by Kasai businessman Kalaa Katema Mpinga (later renamed as Asa Resources Group).

In 2007, diamond exports fell by 80%. There was significant insecurity at the mine, with an engineer responsible for running a new $10 million dragline excavator, and a security guard both murdered. About 10,000 artisanal miners trespassed onto the mining site every day, and employees had not been paid for more than four months.

In October 2008, MIBA employees went on strike several times for not being paid for more than 20 months. Production was suspended between November 2008 and March 2011.

== Recent developments ==
By the early 2010s, Miba still maintained an office in Kinshasa but, out of insolvency, had closed its former offices in Lubumbashi, Ndola in Zambia, Johannesburg in South Africa, and Brussels.

Since 2013, MIBA has handed over management of the Tshibwe cluster to Société Anhui-Congo d’Investissement Minier Sprl (SACIM), a joint venture between MIBA and the Chinese Anhui Foreign Economic Construction Group.

In 2020, the government of the DRC voted to remove MIBA's governing board and restructure the company, after a May 2020 audit found significant irregularities. In August 2020, at the behest of the Félix Tshisekedi administration, the state miner Gécamines gave MIBA $5 million to revamp operations.

According to the Congolese Ministry of Mines, MIBA is one of only two industrial diamond mining companies in the DRC in 2023. However, the vast majority of diamond production in the country is attributed to artisanal miners or the other industrial miner, Anhui Congo Mining Investment Company (SACIM).

== Subsidiary operations ==
=== Energy production ===
MIBA has a subsidiary, Energie du Kasaï (Enerka) which operates the Tshiala hydroelectric power station to power mining activities, and also provides power to the nearby city of Mbuji-Mayi. The plant was previously installed with twelve turbines and 18 megawatt total capacity. These consisted of the 1.4 MW Tshiala 1, 7 MW Lubilanji 1, and 10.08 MW Lubilanji 2. The Lubilanji 2 expansion of the plant was finalized after a $5 million contract with Anglo Belgian Corporation in July 2000.

In 2012, MIBA ended a contract with the company Hydroforce Congo which had managed the hydropower plant for over four years.

In 2021, president Félix Tshisekedi recommended the plant be transferred to the national electricity company SNEL, and a Tshiala II project bring the plant up to combined 8 MW.

As of 2022, only two of the turbines were still working, at a capacity of 3.2 megawatts.

=== Air transportation ===
From 1994 to 2005, MIBA operated a one-aircraft cargo airline known as MIBA Aviation.

== Leadership ==
- Gérard Cravatte, chairman (président) 1961–1967
- Fernand Van Wynsberghe, CEO (administrateur délégué) 1961-1966
- Jacques Barthélémy, CEO 1966-ca. 1970 then chairman
- Gérard Haveaux, chairman 1967-1969
- Bruno Morelli, chairman 1971-1972 then CEO after 1978 and until 1997
- Yav Ikum, chief executive 1973-1977
- Lomboto Is’a Lomboto, chairman (président du conseil d'administration) 1978-1981
- Atundu Molengi, chairman 1982-1985
- Jonas Mukamba Kadiata Nzemba, chairman and managing director (président administrateur délégué) 1986-1997
- Jean-Pierre Moritz, CEO 1997-1999
- Trudon Katende Muya, chairman 1998-1999
- Michel Haubert, administrateur délégué (AD) 2000-2001 then CEO until 2008
- Jean-Charles Okoto Lolakombe, chairman and CEO (président directeur-général) 2000-2002
- Gustave Luabeya Tshitala, chairman 2002-2007
- Paul Kabongo Mfuila, chairman 2007-2009
- Marie-Christine Tusse Daumbo, CEO 2008-2010
- Katende wa Ndaya Muledi, chairman 2010-2013
- Geoffrey Ovian, CEO 2010-2012
- Jean-Pierre Katshidikaya, chairman 2014–2017
- Dieudonne Mbaya Tshakani Tshabantu, acting CEO in 2016 and chairman 2017-2019
- Albert Mukina Kanda Kanda, CEO 2017-2019
- Albert Kalonji Ditutu, acting CEO 2019
- Paulin Lukusa Mudiayi Kalonji, CEO 2019-2023
- Jean-Charles Okoto Lolakombe, chairman since July 2023
- André Kabanda Kana, CEO since September 2023

== Production statistics 1975-2020 ==
MIBA diamond production
Year	Production (carats)
1975	12,400,000
1979	8,100,000
1987	8,200,000
1990	9,556,436
1996	6,500,000
1997	6,500,000
1998	6,400,000
1999	4,800,000
2000	4,5000,000
2001	6,200,000
2002	5,560,000
2003	6,700,000
2004	7,240,000
2005	5,800,000
2006	2,510,000
2009	0
2010	0
2011	243,522
2012	500,726
2013	174,000
2014	289,600
2015	273,300
2016	188,376
2017	72,262
2018	119,000
2019	19,683
2020	38,788

== See also ==
- Mining industry of the Democratic Republic of the Congo
