= Zuri, Africa =

City and bishopric in Roman North Africa

Zuri was a city and bishopric in Roman North Africa, which remains a Latin Catholic titular see.

== History ==
Zuri, possibly identical with present Aïn-Djour, near Carthage in Tunisia, was among the many cities of sufficient important in the Roman province of Africa Proconsularis, to become a suffragan diocese of its Metropolitan capital Carthage's archbishopric. It faded completely, plausibly at the seventh century advent of Islam.

Its only historically recorded bishop, Paulinus, participated as one of the Catholic bishops of Roman Africa in the Council of Carthage in 411, with the schismatic Donatist bishops, which condemned their heresy.

== Titular see ==
The diocese was nominally restored in 1928 as Latin titular bishopric of Zuri (Latin = Curiate Italian) / Zuritan(us) (Latin adjective).

It has had the following incumbents, of the fitting Episcopal (lowest)rank with an archiepiscopal exception:

- Franz Joseph Fischer (1929.12.19 – death 1958.07.24) as Auxiliary Bishop of Rottenburg (Germany) (1929.12.19 – 1958.07.24)
- Auguste-Callixte-Jean Bonnabel (1961.02.13 – 1967.11.07) as emeritate, previously Bishop of Gap (France) (1932.08.16 – 1961.02.13)
- Titular Archbishop: Jean Jadot (1968.02.23 – 2009.01.21) (Belgian) as papal diplomat : Apostolic Delegate to Thailand (1968.02.23 – 1969.08.28), Apostolic Delegate to Laos, Malaysia and Singapore (1968.02.23 – 1971.05.15), Apostolic Pro-Nuncio to Thailand (1969.08.28 – 1971.05.15), Apostolic Pro-Nuncio to Cameroon (1971.05.15 – 1973.05.23), Apostolic Pro-Nuncio to Gabon (1971.05.15 – 1973.05.23), Apostolic Delegate to Equatorial Guinea (1971.05.15 – 1973.05.23), Apostolic Delegate to United States of America (1973.05.23 – 1980.06.27), Permanent Observer (multilateral ambassador) to Organization of American States (OAS) (1978 – 1980.06.27), Pro-President of Secretariat for Non-Christians (1980.06.27 – retired 1984.04.08), died 2009
- Father Gerhard Maria Wagner (2009.01.31 – death? 2009.03.02) as Auxiliary Bishop of Diocese of Linz (2009.01.31 – 2009.03.02)
- Guerino Di Tora (2009.06.01 – ...) (Italian) as Auxiliary Bishop of the Vicariate of Rome (Roma, Italy) (2009.06.01 – ...).

== See also ==
- List of Catholic dioceses in Tunisia
