= Bindura Nickel Corporation =

Zimbabwean mining company

Bindura Nickel Corporation (BNC) is a mining company based in Zimbabwe's Mashonaland Central.

Bindura operates mines and a smelter complex in the area of Bindura, Zimbabwe. BNC is operated and majority-owned Mwana Africa plc, an African multinational mining company based in Johannesburg. BNC is listed on the ZSE and the VFEX.

== History ==
=== Creation of company ===
The company's founding CEO was Kalaa Mpinga.

In 2003, Anglo American sold its stake in the company, selling its 52.9% stake in Bindura Nickel Corporation to Mwana Africa Holdings for $8 million. In 2004, ASA Resource Group acquired the majority share of BNC from Anglo American Corporation, owning about 75%. BNC's debts subsequently went over $31 million.

After the murder of BNC's chairman Leonard Chimimba in May 2006, there were media reports speculating foul play by the Botswana government. BNC hired an investigation firm in South Africa, and said there was "nothing unusual" about his death in a carjacking.

After a plunge in nickel prices, in 2008 BNC began operating on "care and maintenance," i.e. sans production. At the time of its shutdown, it was the only integrated nickel miner, smelter and refinery in Africa. The cost of resuming the Trojan mine was estimated at $50 million, and the Bindura complex at $150 million. Mwana owned 53% of the company.

The shut down of BNC in 2008 resulted in many job losses without compensation and with employees being told not to look for other jobs as they would be reinstated once the mine re-opens. Employees who were retrenched received a stipend of $50 a month. Given that many employees have families, many left the mines with no compensation and have since struggled to make a living with very little consequence to the company.

Mwana was considering delisting BNC from the Zimbabwe Stock Exchange in 2009, as it sought to raised up to $150 million to restart operations in Bindura under CEO Kalaa Mpinga. In September 2011, the company received a $10 million dollar loan to pay for operations while the company sought restart funding. In 2012, after it was closed, BNC stated that it would again begin underground operations at Trojan Nickel Mine. In 2012, China International Mining Group Corporation spent $21 million to recapitalise BNC.

A $43.7 million impairment charge for Bindura Nickel Corporation’s operations in Zimbabwe resulted in huge losses for its parent company, Mwana Africa in 2013. The losses totaled $42.5 million, more than $35 million more than the previous year. At the time, the CEO of BNC was Kalaa Mpinga. Prior to the impairment, the company had shown its first profit since 2007, with revenues in 2013 of $109 million. In 2013, Mpinga stated that a plan to develop Bindura's " refinery and smelter at Mwana's nickel operations" would be enacted by 2014. The mine and plant had been put on hold in 2008 due to weak nickel prices, but had been restarted in 2012.

=== 2014-2015 ===
BNC in 2014 was operating the Freda Rebecca gold mine in Zimbabwe. The mine was complying with a law newly enforced by Zimbabwe that required 51% of the company be held by black nationals of the country.

The company was the best performer on the Zimbabwe Stock Exchange in 2014. After a dip in Bindura Nickel Corporation's share price in 2015, there were reports that the Zimbabwe Stock Exchange had struggled as a result, with the mining index dropping 50% that year. BNC that year was the second worst performer on the exchange.

In 2015, ASA gained control of the company and its assets, after acquiring BNC's holding company Mwana Africa and expelling founder Kalaa Mpinga from the company. The "coup" was orchestrated by Chinese International Mining Group Corporation (CIMGC), BNC's largest shareholder, and CIMGC chairman Yot Hoi Ning. BNC was 75% owned by Mwana Africa in August 2015, with Kalaa Mpinga bidding to retain his position as BNC chairman despite being forced out of Mwana on June 10 after clashes with shareholders.

In 2015, the company stopped its Trojan Mine restart program and re-deep project. The company continued a restructuring in 2015, firing 350 workers, with intent to reduce headcount by up to 1,150 people. Yat Hoi Ning was serving as executive chairman. In 2016, the company cut production costs, increasing gross production and increasing profit by 261%. The following year, their Trojan mine smelter was stalled over a lack of funding. At the time, it was still Africa's only integrated nickel producer.

=== Sale by ASA ===
After 2017, Chinese group ASA Resources Group said it was selling its stake in Bindura Nickel Corporation. At the time, ASA operated Trojan Nickel Mine through BNC. In January 2017, Asa Resources owned 76% of BNC.

By July 2018, the company was in the red, with assets of $28 million and liabilities totaling $32.7 million. At that point, the smelter restart project at Bindura had been suspended due to funding constraints, and was 83% complete. At that time, the company pointed to hobbling power costs in Zimbabwe, and was pressing the government for a "standstill on electricity costs in order to keep the industry viable."

In 2019, BNC was lobbying the Reserve Bank of Zimbabwe to change forex rules relating to mining companies. In 2019, it was saying that its Trojan Mine smelter would be operational by October 2020. The company had recently been acquired by Sotic International.

In 2019, it was working on a feasibility study of a $200 million Hunters Road mine, which was estimated to have 200,000 tons of nickel. In September 2019, BNC was evaluating takeover bids. In 2020, BNC was headed by CEO Batirai Manhando.

== Key people ==
The chairman is Muchadeyi Masunda.

== Operations ==
Mines

- Shangani Mine - Zimbabwe
- Trojan Nickel Mine - Bindura

Products include nickel, copper and cobalt.

Smelter

- The Bindura Smelter and Refinery Complex is located south of the town of Bindura. The smelter produces nickel cathodes, copper sulphide and cobalt hydroxide.

== See also ==
- Nickel mining and extraction
- Copper mining and extraction
