= Jeanne Tercafs =

Belgian artist

- Born: 1898
- Died: 1944 (aged 45–46)
- Known for: Sculpture

Jeanne Tercafs (1898–1944) was a Belgian artist.

== Biography ==
Tercafs was born in 1898. She was married to Alexis Bertrand. She studied at the Académie royale des beaux-arts de Liège and the Académie Royale des Beaux-Arts in Brussels. In 1935 she applied for and received from the grant from the Belgium Ministry of Colonies to travel to the Congo. She was the first woman to receive a grant of this type. From 1935 through 1940 she made 3 trips to the Belgian Congo (now the Democratic Republic of the Congo). Tercafs died in 1944.

== Gallery ==
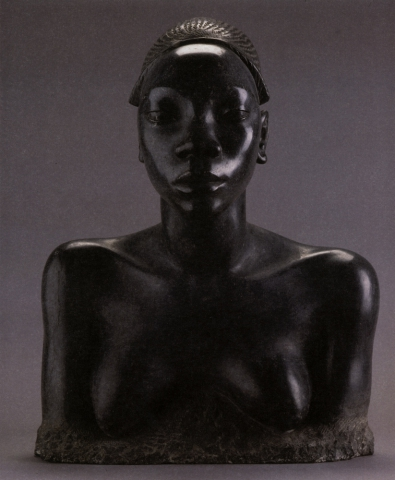
Nito Mayogo woman

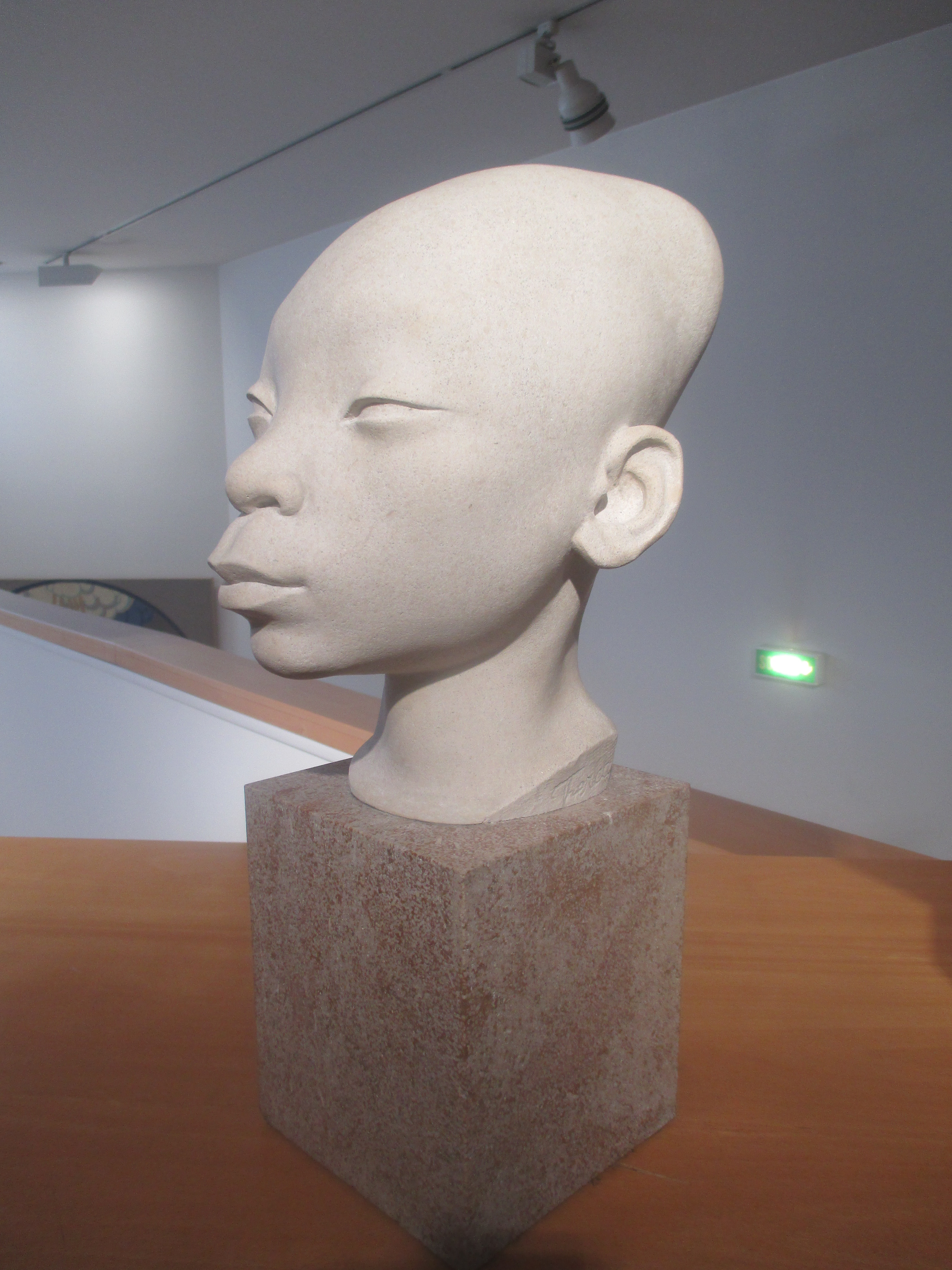
African Mangbétu
