= Asa Resources Group =

Mining company in South Africa and England

Asa Resources Group PLC
- Type: Public limited company
- Traded as: AIM: ASA (until 2018)
- Industry: Mining
- Predecessor: Mwana Africa; African Gold
- Founded: September 27, 1987; 38 years ago in City of London, United Kingdom
- Headquarters: City of London, United Kingdom
- Revenue: ▼US$121.3 million (2016)
- Net income: ▼US$−4.76 million (2016)
- Total assets: ▲US$235.5 million (2016)
- Total equity: ▼US$135.5 million (2016)
- Website: www.asaresource.co.uk

Asa Resources Group is a mining company based in Johannesburg and London. According to the company's website, it is the first African-owned and African-managed business to be listed in the Resources sector of the London Stock Exchange's Alternative Investment Market. Asa was founded in 1987.

== History ==
=== 2003-2015: Beginning of the company ===
ASA founded in 2003 by a consortium of businesspeople, including Kalaa Katema Mpinga, David Fish, Tim Wadeson, Oliver Mandishona Chidawu and Douglas Tawanda Munetsi. Then Mwana Africa, in 2003 ASA became the majority shareholder in Bindura Nickel Corporation after acquiring it from Anglo American Corporation. The following year, it acquired the majority share in Freda Rebecca Gold Mine. It is based in the United Kingdom.

China International Mining Group Corporation (CIMGC) became an ASA shareholder in 2012 when it injected $21 million into restarting Bindura Nickel Corporation (BNC). In 2012, ASA injected $23 million into BNC, allowing it to refurbish its Trojan Mine. Between 2003 and 2015, ASA loaned $11 million to Freda Rebecca Gold Mine, with ASA placed under administration in the United Kingdom. The firm had a poor financial performance in 2013, with losses totaling $42.5 million, more than $35 million more than the previous year. This was due to a $43.7 million impairment charge for its Bindura Nickel Corporation (BNC) operations in Zimbabwe. In October 2013, Asa appointed Yim Chiu Kwan as its finance director.

In 2014, Mwana Africa fired chairperson Mark Wellesley-Wood "amid suspicion he was an agent for a hostile takeover" by Centar Mining. Mwana Africa in September 2015, rebranded as Asa Resources, with Mwana Africa changing their name after the exit of Mwana founder Kalaa Mpinga. Mawana acquired BNC in 2015.

=== 2016-2018 ===
In 2016, it owned 85% of the Freda Rebecca gold mine, based in Zimbabwe. ASA between 2015 and April 2017 was accused of mismanagement due to the dominance of its shareholder China International Group Corporation. In Zimbabwe, there were disputes between Freda Rebecca Gold Mine employees and Asa Resources over salary drops and management changes, with workers giving notice of intention to strike.

In April 2017, ASA chairman and CEO Yat Hoi Nang was fired over allegations of fraud. He had been appointed executive chairman in mid-2015. In July 2017 as well, ASA's shares on the London exchange were suspended, after alleged improper accounting of assets among subsidiaries.

In 2017, a manhunt was triggered by Zimbabwean authorities for two former ASA Resource Group executives, over allegations of fraud. At the time, the former CEO and finance director had been missing for several months. $4.3 million were reported unaccounted for, but the company said operations would continue. It was reported that Asa was facing a hostile takeover by Rich Pro, a Chinese firm allegedly connected to the two missing executives. The Rich Pro bid had been criticised by shareholders for being too low.

In February 2018, 10 firms under ASA Resources Group were "seeking to be placed under provisional judicial management citing viability challenges," including Freda Rebecca Holdings, Hunter’s Road Nickel Mine, Trojan Nickel Mine, BSR Limited, Greenline Enterprises, ASA Services Zimbabwe, Bindura Estates and Mwana Properties. The company delisted in London in March 2018 after "delays in fixing a deep cash flow crisis." At the time, David Murangari was head of the board, while Toindepi Muganyi was interim CEO.

In 2018, a number of its mines were struggling with debt, with Freda Rebecca partly attributing the issue to mismanagement by ASA Resource Group. Panaf was bidding to buy ASA Resource Group's assets in January 2018. In December that year, it struck a deal with an unnamed company to sell its stake in BNC.

=== 2019-2020 ===
In 2019, ASA Resources in Zimbabwe included its two major mines and an agribusiness venture. It also had diamond operations in South Africa and copper in the Congo. Further assets included a nickel mine in Botswana and a base metal exploration in the Democratic Republic of Congo.

It was working on finalizing its exit from BNC to an unnamed mining company by October 2019. At the time, ASA Resource group was struggling to pay creditors.

In 2019, it was still producing gold through its Fred Rebecca gold mine in Zimbabwe. The mine was debt-ridden at the time, with Freda Rebecca Gold Mine and nine other gold mining firms under ASA Resources Group "seeking to be placed under provisional judicial management citing viability challenges." There had also been legal battles between the boards of ASA and Freda Rebecca Holdings.

The sale of BNC was finalized in October 2019, with some technical hurdles remaining. At the time, BNC had halted its smelter construction project, and was entirely focused on its "shaft deepening project."

== Operations ==
Asa's products include gold, nickel, copper, zinc, cobalt and, more recently, diamonds and petroleum. Major mining operation interests as of 2007:

=== By country ===
- Democratic Republic of the Congo
  - Zani-Kodo Joint Venture: gold
  - Societé minière de Bakwanga (MIBA): diamonds
  - Gravity Diamonds
  - Katanga Concessions: copper, cobalt
- Ghana
  - Konongo: gold
  - Banka: gold
  - Ahanta: gold
- Zimbabwe
  - Bindura Nickel: nickel, copper, cobalt
    - Bindura Smelter and Refinery Complex
  - Hunter's Road: nickel
  - Freda Rebecca Mine: gold
  - Maligreen Mine: formerly Cluff Mining; gold
  - Makaha Deposit

=== Companies ===
- SouthernEra Diamonds, of Canada, the Democratic Republic of Congo, Gabon and South Africa.

Asa maintains a corporate office in South Africa. The company is expanding its operations by acquiring extant mining companies.
