= Jules Jadot =

Belgian engineer and business executive

A medal given to Jules Jadot by his colleagues and collaborators on his retirement as chairman of the National Railway Company of Belgium

Jules Adelin Joseph Jadot (1873–1953) was a Belgian engineer and business executive.

== Life ==
Jadot was born in On-lez-Jemelle (now part of Marche-en-Famenne) on 24 October 1873. He was the younger brother of Jean Jadot, who would become the governor of the major holding Société Générale de Belgique. Like his brother, he studied engineering at the Catholic University of Leuven, graduating as an industrial engineer in 1893 and as a civil engineer in 1894. He became involved with works on the Canal du Centre and the ports of Bruges and Zeebrugge. In 1898, his uncle, Jean Cousin, secured him a commission from the Banque d'Outremer to develop the extraction of copper at Gamaqua, Brazil. These deposits turned out not to be viable, and in 1902 Jules's brother, Jean, provided an opportunity for him to transfer to the affiliate Compagnie Internationale d'Orient, where he succeeded Emile Francqui as the company's general agent in China. Unofficially, he represented Leopold II's interests in the Canton–Hankow Railway, and the French company building tramways and electrical lighting in Shanghai. After Jean Jadot became governor of the Société Générale, he delegated a lot of his Chinese interests to Jules, who became managing director of the Société Belge des Chemins de Fer en Chine. He also undertook railway building enterprises in Spain, Brazil and Turkey. In 1911 he carried out an enquiry into the unprofitability of the Union Minière du Haut-Katanga, recommending company restructuring. After the First World War, he became chair of the board of the Société de Traction et Electricité, a subholding of the Société Générale, and became heavily involved in the Belgian railways. He authored a programme for the reorganisation of the state-owned railways and from 1926 to 1938 served as the first chairman of the National Railway Company of Belgium. He died in Brussels on 29 October 1953.

Jadot never married, and left substantial bequests to the University of Leuven, and its engineering alumni organisation. A bibliophile, he also left a valuable collection of books to the Royal Library of Belgium.
