= Makumbi =

Makumbi is a surname. Notable people with the surname include:

- Godfrey Makumbi (1962–2015), Anglican bishop in Uganda
- James Makumbi (1942–2018), Ugandan physician and politician
- Jennifer Nansubuga Makumbi (born 1960s), Ugandan-British novelist and short story writer
