= Jean Jadot =

Belgian Catholic priest and apostolic nuncio (1909–2009)

His Excellency, The Most Reverend Jean Jadot
- President of the Secretariat for Non-Christians
- Undated portrait of Jadot
- Church: Catholic Church
- See: Titular See of Zuri
- In office: 1980–1984
- Predecessor: Sergio Pignedoli
- Successor: Francis Arinze
- Previous post: Priest

Orders
- Ordination: 11 February 1934 by Jozef-Ernest van Roey
- Consecration: 1 May 1968 by Leo Joseph Suenens

Personal details
- Born: 23 November 1909 Brussels, Belgium
- Died: 21 January 2009 (aged 99) Woluwe-Saint-Pierre, Belgium
- Coat of arms

Jean Jadot (French pronunciation: [ʒɑ̃ ʒado]; 23 November 1909 – 21 January 2009) was a Belgian Catholic prelate who served as apostolic delegate to the United States (the first non-Italian to do so) from 1973 to 1980, and as president of the Secretariat for Non-Christians from 1980 to 1984.

== Biography ==
Jean Jadot was born in Brussels. He was born to a well-known aristocratic family, and his father, Lambert, was a noted civil engineer who worked around the world, including China and Congo. In 1926, he entered the Catholic University of Leuven, from where he obtained his doctorate in philosophy magna cum laude in 1930. His thesis was on the work of Alfred Edward Taylor.

Despite his father's opposition, Jadot then entered the seminary of the Archdiocese of Mechelen, and was ordained to the priesthood by Jozef-Ernest Cardinal van Roey on 11 February 1934. On 28 February 1968, Pope Paul VI appointed him titular archbishop of Zuri and apostolic delegate to Thailand, Laos, and the Malay Peninsula (Malaysia and Singapore). He was consecrated a bishop by Cardinal Leo Joseph Suenens on 1 May 1968. He was appointed Apostolic Pro-Nuncio to Thailand on 28 August 1969. On 15 May 1971, Jadot was appointed apostolic pro-nuncio to Gabon and Cameroon as well as apostolic delegate to Equatorial Guinea. On 23 May 1973 he was appointed the apostolic delegate to the United States.

Jadot was considered a progressive leader of the Roman Curia, and was at times polarizing in the statements he made and decisions he took. Jadot was seen favorably by the Vatican under Pope Paul VI, who rejected Jadot's initial offer to resign as apostolic delegate. On 27 June 1980, Pope John Paul II appointed him the Pro-President of the Secretariat of Non-Christians, a position normally held by a cardinal. On 19 June 1982, Jadot ordained Robert Francis Prevost for the Augustinians in Rome. Prevost was later elected pope on 8 May 2025, becoming Pope Leo XIV.

Jadot's progressive views were the main obstacle to his being made a cardinal by Pope John Paul II, who did not include him when he created cardinals in February 1983. Pope John Paul accepted his resignation on 8 April 1984, a few months before his 75th birthday when he would have been required to submit his resignation. Jadot died in Woluwe-Saint-Pierre, Belgium, on 21 January 2009, aged 99.
