= Forminière =

Belgian colonial enterprise

The Société internationale forestière et minière du Congo (French; lit. 'International Forestry and Mining Company of the Congo'), known by the shorthand Forminière, was a mining company in Belgian Congo. Founded in 1906 with an intended diversified portfolio of activities, it soon found diamonds in the Kasai region and made diamond mining its main activity. It was headquartered in Tshikapa from 1912 to 1954, when it relocated its head office to Bakwanga (renamed in 1963 as Mbuji-Mayi).

In summer 1960 at the start of the Congo Crisis, Forminière became entangled in the secession of South Kasai, in which it provided material support to separatist leader Albert Kalonji before leaving the region in early 1961. Its Congolese mining operations ceased altogether in 1962, and it was finally wound up in 1966. Its activities outside Congo continued under a Belgian entity, named Interfor (1960-1968) then Indufor after 1968.

== Foundation and part-nationalization (1906-1908) ==
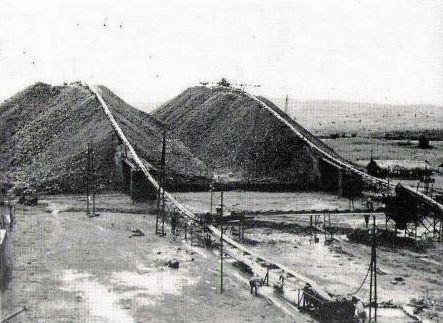
Slag heaps at the Bakwanga industrial diamond mine operated by Forminière, c.1959

In the early years of the 20th century, the Congo Free State propaganda war persuaded Leopold II of Belgium that he might not be able to keep personal ownership of the Congo Free State for much longer. In response, he attempted to secure continued economic benefit from it by creating three companies that would control the territory's principal resources.

The so-called "companies of 1906" were the Union Minière du Haut-Katanga (UMHK), Compagnie du chemin de fer du bas-Congo au Katanga (BCK), and Forminière. All three were established in the fall of 1906 with advice from Jean Jadot and Hubert Droogmans, respectively with initial capital of 10 million, 2 million, and 3.5 million Belgian francs. The Forminière's capital, initially divided into 7,000 shares, was initially held by the Congo Free State (50 percent); Leopold's Foundation (8 percent); a group of American investors led by Thomas Fortune Ryan and Daniel Guggenheim (25 percent); and a group of Belgian investors led by the Société Générale de Belgique (SGB, 17 percent). This made Forminière an unusual case for that era of a colonial company that was directly state-controlled, even though that state was itself still private property of Leopold.

Leopold's plans were thwarted when the Free State was taken over by the Belgian Government in 1908, however, as he was not allowed to keep the Foundation of the Crown for himself. Instead, the Foundation was terminated, and its assets and liabilities were directly assumed by the Belgian state. The Belgian state thus retained a 55-percent ownership stake in the Forminière.

== Diamond mining in Colonial Congo ==
In 1907, Forminière prospectors collected samples near Tshikapa which were found two years later to contain a diamond, creating the basis for the company's successful development diamond mining in Kasai. Subsequent prospection in 1911 indicated a significant quantity of diamonds, on which basis the Forminière more than doubled its capital to 16,000 shares. Its headcount in Kasai grew rapidly, from several hundred in 1913 to about 7,000 in 1919, 10,000 in 1921, 20,000 in 1924, and 25,000 in 1929. That made Forminière the largest employer in the entire Belgian Congo in the 1920s.

The above numbers included staff that Forminière employed for its own mines in Tshikapa, but also for mines it operated under contract from other Belgian companies. Despite not being majority-owned by the SGB, Forminière was widely viewed as part of the SGB-group of related companies that dominated economic activity in the Belgian Congo. Those companies in the group that held diamond mining rights outsourced all operations to Forminière to reap industrial synergies. They were:

- the Société Minière du Bécéka or Mibéka, established 1919 and majority-owned by the SGB, with industrial-grade diamond mines mostly in Bakwanga (now Mbuji-Mayi);
- the Société Minière du Kasai, est. 1920
- the Société Minière du Luebo, est. 1921
- the Société Minière de la Lueta, est. 1926

The latter three ventures, all active in the so-called Western Kasai mining basin or entre-Kasai-Luebo (EKL, lit. 'between Kasai and Luebo'), formed a consortium in 1926, known as the EKL Consortium or EKL Group. The Mibéka turned out to be the most important of these companies by far, and Bakwanga gradually replaced Tshikapa as the center of gravity of Forminière's mining footprint. These contractual arrangements allowed Forminière to keep a practical monopoly on diamond production in Kasai until the end of 1960.

Due in part to a drop in production that coincided with the outbreak of the Second World War, the United States' Office of Strategic Services to investigate possible diversion of production to the Axis powers. In a 1945 lawsuit against De Beers, the United States Department of Justice Antitrust Division attempted to get access to purchasing directly from Forminière instead of through the De Beers as a middleman. The lawsuit was eventually dropped in 1948 due to jurisdictional issues.

During World War II, Forminière directed its operations from its Congolese headquarters at Tshikapa, even though it kept its Brussels office (siège administratif) under German occupation. By 1944, the government of Belgian Congo owned half of its shares, the rest being mostly in the hands of US investors.

After the war, Forminière dominated the production of diamonds in the Belgian Congo, on its own account in Tshikapa and under contract from Mibéka in Bakwanga. In 1959, its own production of diamonds rose to 425,234 carats., vastly surpassed by the production at Bakwanga as the Tshikapa site had entered a declining phase. By early 1958, Forminière employed around 15,000 workers in Kasai, mostly in Bakwanga.

== Other activities ==
Forminière was involved in a number of other ventures, even though diamond extraction in Kasai remained its main activity. Like other Belgian colonial companies, it developed projects mainly via the creation of dedicated affiliate companies. These included, among others:

- Société Minière de la Tele, named after Lake Tele (established 1912): gold mining in Eastern Congo
- Société Forestière et Commerciale du Congo Belge, or Forescom (est. 1912): forestry
- Société de Colonisation Agricole au Mayumbé, or S.C.A.M. (est. 1913): food production in the Mayombe region of central Congo
- Bourse du Travail du Kasai, sometimes referred to as Boutraka (est. 1921): labor recruitment agency, initially chaired by Alexis Bertrand
- Société d'Élevage et de Culture au Congo Belge, or S.E.C. (est. 1925, three-way joint venture with BCK and Mibéka): cattle ranching
- Société d'Exploitations Agricoles et Industrielles de la Biaro (est. 1925): economic development in the Tshopo region of eastern Congo
- Société d'Élevage de la Luilu, or Elvaluilu (est. 1951): cattle ranching in the Luilu Territory of Kasai

By the time of Congolese independence Forminière was also a shareholder of the Société de Recherches et d'Exploitation des Bauxites du Congo (Bauxicongo) and Société de Recherches et d'Exploitations des Petroles (Socorep), both in partnership with the UMHK and/or SGB.

== Congolese independence and aftermath ==
The Forminière was severely disrupted by Congolese independence in mid-1960 and the subsequent Congo Crisis. In June 1960, unusually among Belgian colonial companies, it opted to remain headquartered in Congo, which meant that the 55 percent block of shares which had been owned by the Belgian state became property of the new country, but that setup was soon put into question by uncertainty about the latter's very survival and integrity.

Immediately after independence, Moïse Tshombe proclaimed the independence of the State of Katanga, triggering the United Nations Operation in the Congo which initially consolidated Katanga's secession. Forminière and Mibéka were prompted by those developments to support a similar secession in South Kasai, which was initiated by Albert Kalonji in early August 1960. From late July 1960 on, the Forminière started providing Kalonji with facilities, financing and weapons. Kalonji relocated to the former villa of the Forminière chief executive, which has remained the seat of local government ever since. Early on, Kalonji's short-lived state of South Kasai was derisively referred to as the République de la Forminière.

On 1 January 1961, the Société Minière du Bécéka (Mibéka) terminated its outsourcing contract with the Forminière and took over direct operations of the Bakwanga mining site, which in late 1961 it transferred to a newly formed Congolese subsidiary, the Société Minière de Bakwanga or Miba. The legacy of Forminière's decades of local involvement, however, led to frequent mistaken reports that Forminière was the Belgian company involved in South Kasai's secession even in its later stages in 1961 and 1962. Meanwhile, the ownership status of the 55-percent equity stake in Forminière formerly held by the Belgian government remained unclear, as it could have become property of South Kasai in the event of the latter's recognition as a legitimate country.

Forminière abruptly terminated all its mining operations around Tshikapa in January 1962, at the same time as Miba stopped exploitation of its own western (Lulua) sector. The final suppression of the Kasai secession in October 1962 resolved the issue of Forminière's majority ownership to the benefit of the central Congolese government. Forminière was subsequently wound up in by the Congolese authorities in 1966. Most of the company's archives, which were kept in Congo, have disappeared.

== Activity in Belgium ==
In Brussels, Forminière was initially established at Rue Montagne du Parc 4 in a head office annex of the SGB, then in 1920 at Rue du Commerce 56, in 1921 at Rue des Colonies 66 (also a Société Générale facility), and in 1925 moved to Rue Royale 42, yet another SGB property where several other colonial companies were also domiciled including initially Mibéka. Forminière kept its Brussels branch (siège administratif) there until its demise in the 1960s. The SGB itself had its head office in the same urban block, as had the BCK at 7, rue de la Montagne du Parc. All these buildings were demolished during the reconstruction of the entire block by the SGB between 1968 and 1980.

In the late 1930s Forminière erected a head office annex down rue Royale at No. 54, on the site of the former mansion of the Matthieu banking family of which it kept the street façade; that building is occasionally mistaken for Forminière's former head office. Several Congolese affiliates of Forminière, including the Forescom, had their Brussels office there in the 1950s and early 1960s. In 1969 the same building became the Brussels branch of Miba, which remained there until the late 1990s. Miba formally registered its change of Brussels address in 2004.

In 1960 Forminière created a Belgian subsidiary, the Société Internationale Commerciale et Financière de la Forminière, known as Interfor (not to be confused with namesake Canada-based Interfor Corporation), to which it transferred all its activities outside of Congo, including the sale of diamonds extracted by Forminière on international markets. In 1968, Interfor was renamed as the Compagnie Industrielle et Forestière, or Indufor. Indufor (not to be confused with either Indufor Oy, a Helsinki-based forestry consultancy, or an earlier Compagnie Industrielle et Forestière established in Belgian Congo in the 1920s) had its office at Rue Belliard 7 in Brussels.

== Leadership ==
Like most Belgian joint-stock companies of its era, the Forminière was governed by a board of directors (conseil d'administration) led by a chairman (président), and a chief executive officer who was also a board member (administrateur délégué). From 1914 on, its operations in the Congo were managed by a local executive, who from 1926 to 1953 was referred to as "representative of the mining companies in Kasai" and later on as "general manager in Africa" (directeur général en Afrique).

Following the death of Alphonse Cayen in Brussels on 9 March 1943, the CEO position was left vacant until Jules Baudine's appointment after the liberation of Belgium.

=== Chairman ===
- Ferdinand Baeyens, 1906-1913
- Jean Jadot, 1913-1932
- Firmin Van Brée, 1932-1949, outside occupied Belgium during World War II
- Félicien Cattier, in Belgium during WWII
- Paul Gillet, 1949-?

=== Chief Executive ===
- Jean Jadot, 1906-1913
- Émile Francqui, 1913-1932
- Alphonse Cayen, 1932-1943
- Jules Baudine, 1945-1949
- Firmin Van Brée, 1949-1950
- Georges Lescornez, 1951-?

=== General Manager in Africa ===
- Georges Lescornez, 1926-1928
- Jules Baudine, 1928-1936
- Adolphe Wisseler, 1936-1938
- Albert Parmentier, 1938-1947
- Gérard Cravatte, 1947-1959?
- Igor Wasilewski, in 1959
- Raymond Jacmay, 1959-1961

== See also ==
- Diamang (Angola)
- American Congo Company

== Bibliography ==
- Forminière 1906-1956, Brussels, Ed. L. Cuypers, 1956, 211p.
