= Jean Jadot (banker) =

Belgian engineer and banker (1862–1932)

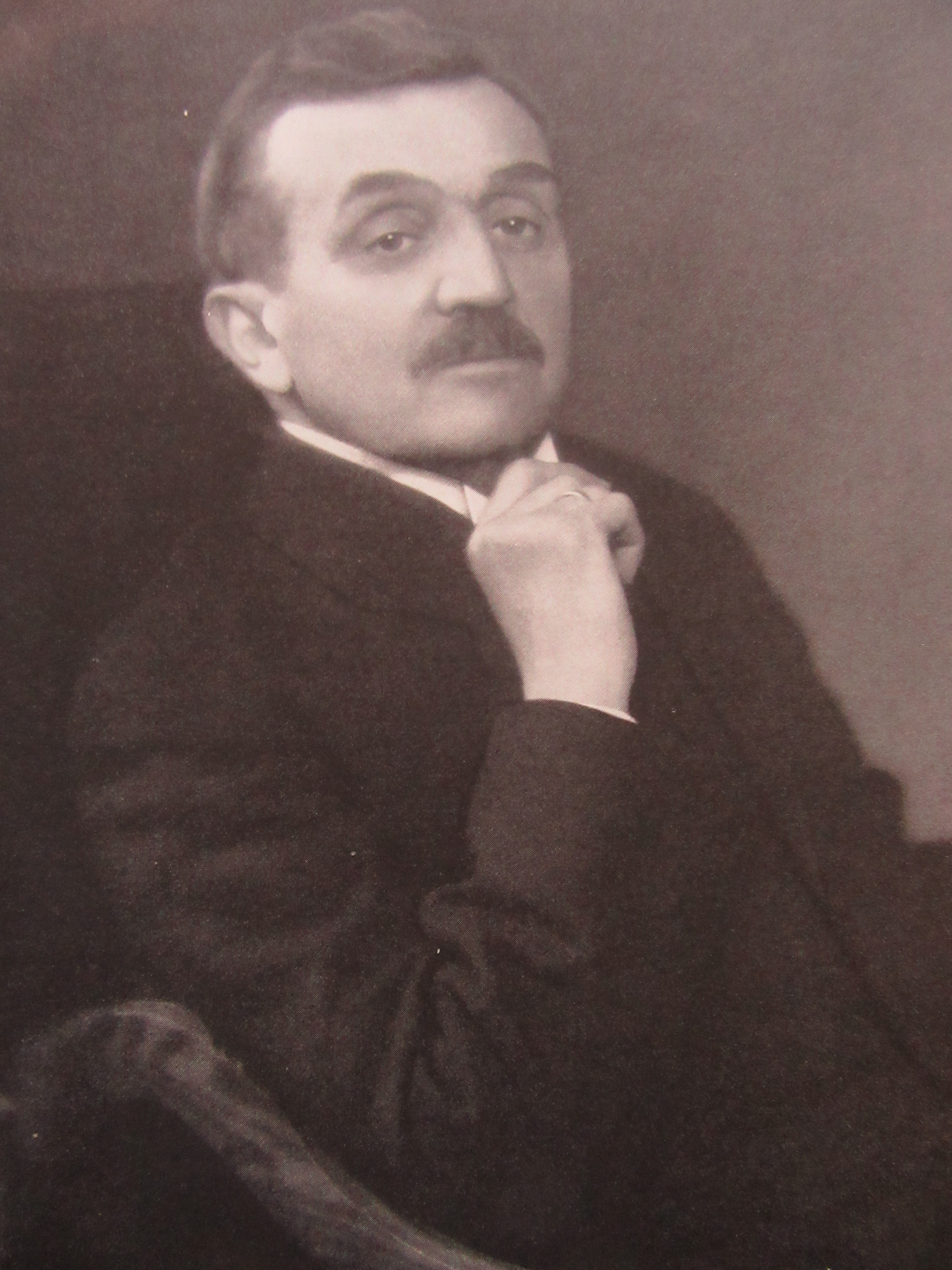
- Born: 1862; Belgium
- Died: 1932 (aged 69–70)
- Occupations: Engineer, banker

Jean Jadot (French: [ʒɑ̃ ʒado]; 1862–1932) was a Belgian railway engineer who became a leading banker in the early 20th century.

== Early years (1862–1898) ==
Jean Jadot was born in Belgium in 1862. His younger brothers, who also became engineers, were Jules and Lambert Jadot (1875–1967). He graduated from the University of Louvain and worked in Belgium and Luxembourg for several years. In 1894 Jadot went to Egypt, where he developed the tram system in Cairo. He was promoted to director of the Lower Egypt Railroad Company.

== China (1898–1905) ==
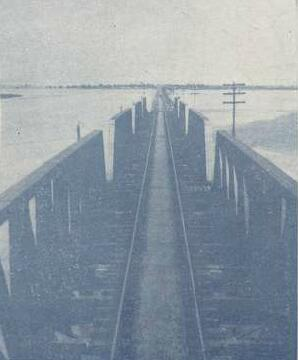
South section of the bridge over the Yellow River, since demolished

In 1898 Jadot moved to China to work for the Société d'Etude de Chemins de Fer en Chine as works director for construction of the Beijing–Hankou railway. Starting in March 1899, the work progressed from both ends. By the end of 1899 in the south the embankments had been completed along a 100 kilometres (62 mi) stretch and 20 kilometres (12 mi) of track had been laid down. In the north there were 60 kilometres (37 mi) of embankments and 10 kilometres (6.2 mi) of track. The Boxer Rebellion halted construction for several months in 1900. All the railway officials were given arms to protect themselves.

In January 1902 the Imperial Court travelled along a completed section of the line on their way back to Beijing. In June 1905 the 3,000 metres (9,800 ft) bridge over the Yellow River was open to traffic. The 1,214 kilometres (754 mi) line with 125 stations was opened on 14 November 1905. It was recognized as a major (and profitable) achievement, and Jadot gained great credit.

The Société Générale de Belgique took advantage of the railway project to open the Banque Sino Belge in 1902. Jadot did not agree with the ambition of King Leopold II of Belgium to gain territory, which was anyway not practical due to the increase in Chinese nationalism after the suppression of the rebellion. Jadot felt that Belgium was successfully promoting its industry without imperial possessions. He said, “For my part, I still believe that the Belgian concession has so far only been inconvenient for Belgian interests and that in the future it will be of no use".

== Later career (1906–1932) ==
On his return to Belgium in 1906 Jadot was appointed director in charge of industry development at the Société Générale de Belgique. Under his direction the Société Générale participated in setting up three mining-related companies in the Congo Free State: the Union Minière du Haut-Katanga (UMHK), the Société Internationale Forestière et Minière du Congo (Forminière) and the Compagnie du Chemin de Fer du Bas-Congo au Katanga (BCK). The BCK was founded on 31 October 1906 by the Comité Spécial du Katanga, the Congo Free State and the Société Générale de Belgique to build a rail link from Bukama in Katanga to Port Franqui on the Kasai River, from where mining products could be shipped down to Léopoldville. Jadot was made managing director of the BCK. He was assigned by Leopold II to several other projects in the Belgian Congo.

In 1913 Jadot was appointed governor of the Société Générale de Belgique. Under him the bank entered into new fields of financing, including electricity generation, pharmaceuticals and non-ferrous metals refining. Jadot died in 1932.

== Sources ==
- Abbeloos, Jan-Frederik (2008), Belgium's Expansionist History between 1870 and 1930: Imperialism and the Globalisation of Belgian Business (PDF), Ghent University
- BCK - KDL - Le site des chemins de fer du Katanga, 2010, archived from the original on 2010-12-04
- History of a bank: building the Beijing - Hankou railway on the eve of the 20th century, 8 April 2013, archived from the original on 2022-04-20
- Jean Jadot, the engineer banker, Source d'Histoire, 2021
