= Léon Morel =

Belgian colonial administrator

Léon-Georges Morel

Governor of Léopoldville Province
- In office 1946–1950
- Preceded by: Marcel Maquet
- Succeeded by: Lucien Lardinois

Personal details
- Born: 9 April 1892
- Occupation: Colonial administrator

Léon-Georges Morel was a Belgian colonial administrator. He was Governor of Léopoldville Province in the Belgian Congo from 1946 to 1950.

== Career ==
Léon-Georges Morel was born on 9 April 1892. He joined the colonial service on 26 February 1920 as a territorial administrator 2nd class. He was territorial administrator of Thysville (Cataractes-Sud) when the Kimbanguist movement emerged in Nkamba in 1921. Simon Kimbangu began his healing mission as a prophet in the village of Nkamba on 6 April 1921. Morel wrote of the movement: "The concern for peace and public tranquility implicitly requires that it be brought to an end calmly but without delay ...". The Belgian authorities were worried that Kimbangu might lead a revolt, and on 6 June 1921 Morel ordered his arrest. He was captured some time after, found guilty of disturbing the public order and sentenced to death. The King intervened and his sentence was reduced to life imprisonment, which he served for 30 years in Elisabethville (Katanga).

In 1922 Morel was promoted to territorial administrator 1st class. In 1926 he was appointed principal territorial administrator. In 1928 Morel became deputy district commissioner in Boma (Bas-Congo). From 1932 he was deputy district commissioner under F. De Bok in the urban district of Léopoldville.

From 1934 to 1942 Morel was district commissioner in Léopoldville. In September–November 1939 the authorities were informed that the Mission des Noirs (Mission of the Blacks) had been founded in the Bas Congo and Léopoldville. Morel reported that the Vicar Apostolic of Kisantu, Mgr Alphonse Verwimp (1885-1964), had told him that Simon Mpadi was the promoter of the new movement, and that the Salvation Army adjutant Henri Becquet denied any influence of the Salvation Army.

Morel was governor of Léopoldville Province from 1946 to 1950. He succeeded Marcel Maquet (1891–1964) and was succeeded by Lucien Lardinois (1898–1956). After returning to Belgium he served as secretary general of the Royal Belgian Colonial Union. Morel received the Royal Order of the Lion on 8 April 1946, and on 20 August 1949 was promoted to commander of this order.

== Sources ==
- Akyeampong, Emmanuel Kwaku; Gates, Henry Louis (2 February 2012), Dictionary of African Biography, OUP USA, ISBN 978-0-19-538207-5
- Belgium (1949), Belgisch staatsblad
- "Congo (Kinshasa) Provinces", Rulers.org
- Desroche, Henri (1971), "D'un Evangile à une Eglise. Note sur le Kimbanguisme et la diversité de ses images", Archives de sciences sociales des religions (in French), 31: 7–14
- "Morel, Léon", Africamuseum.be
- Zana Etambala, Mathieu (2005), "L'Armee du Salut et la Naissance de la 'mission des Noirs' au Congo Belge, 1934 – 1940", Annales Aequatoria (in French), 26, Honoré Vinck: 67–164, JSTOR 25836854
