= Holy city =

City important to the history or faith of a specific religion

A holy city is a city important to the history or faith of a specific religion. Such cities may also contain at least one headquarters complex (often containing a religious edifice, seminary, shrine, residence of the leading cleric of the religion and/or chambers of the religious leadership's offices) which constitutes a major destination of human traffic, or pilgrimage to the city, especially for major ceremonies and observances. A holy city is a symbolic city, representing attributes beyond its natural characteristics.

== List of holy cities in the world ==
Location of Sapta Puri, the seven holy cities of India.

=== Africa ===
City	Country	Religion(s)
Axum	Ethiopia	Christianity
Alexandria	Egypt	Christianity
Chinguetti	Mauritania	Islam
Ewu	Nigeria	Christianity
Harar	Ethiopia	Islam
Ifẹ	Nigeria	Yoruba religion
Lalibela	Ethiopia	Christianity
Nkamba	Democratic Republic of the Congo	Kimbanguism
Kairouan	Tunisia	Islam
Nri-Igbo	Nigeria	Odinala
Point of Sangomar	Senegal	Serer religion
Touba	Senegal	Islam (Sufi)
Yaboyabo	Senegal	Serer religion

=== Asia ===
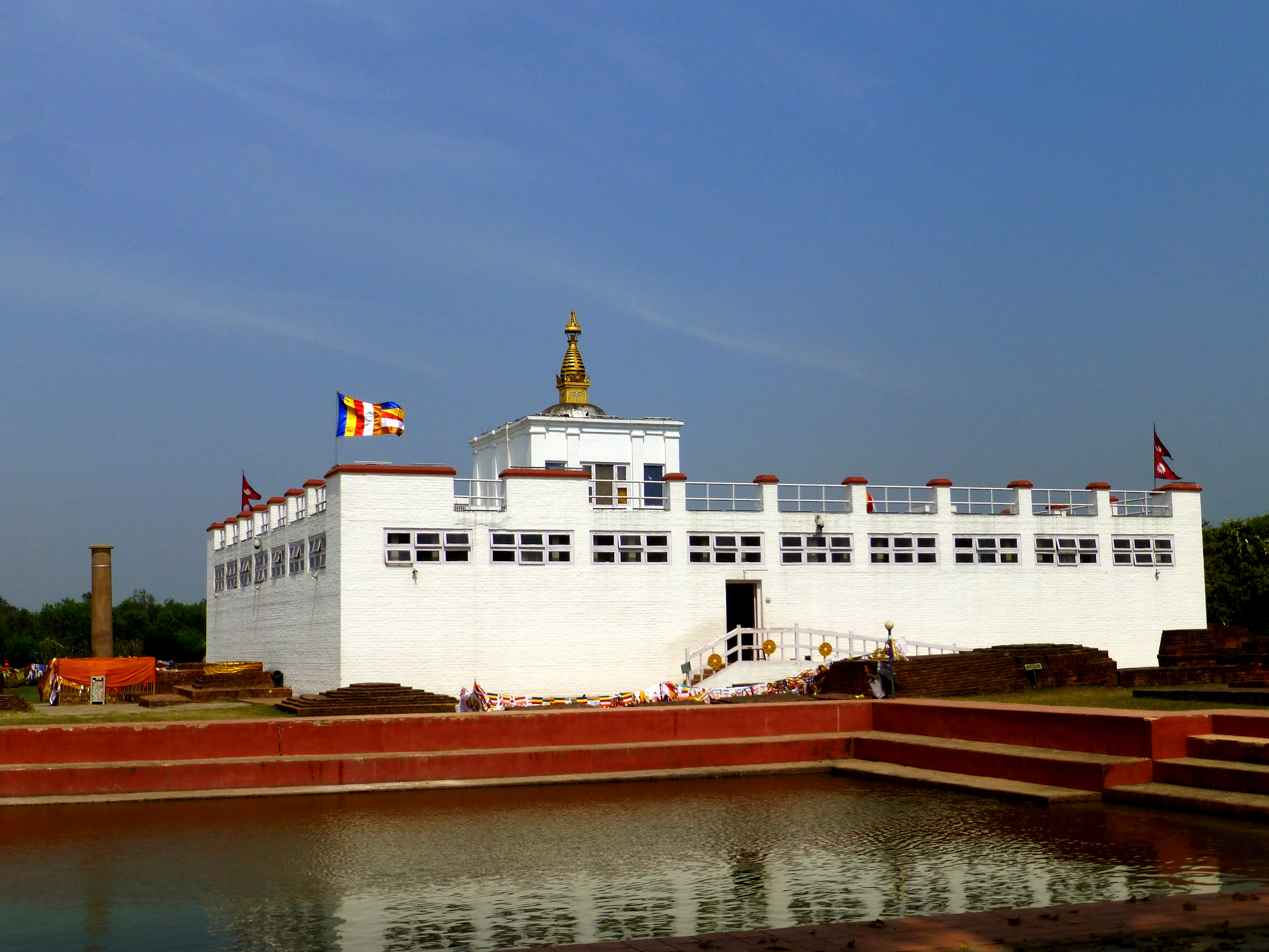
Lumbini, the birthplace of Buddha, is considered one of the holiest cities in Buddhism.

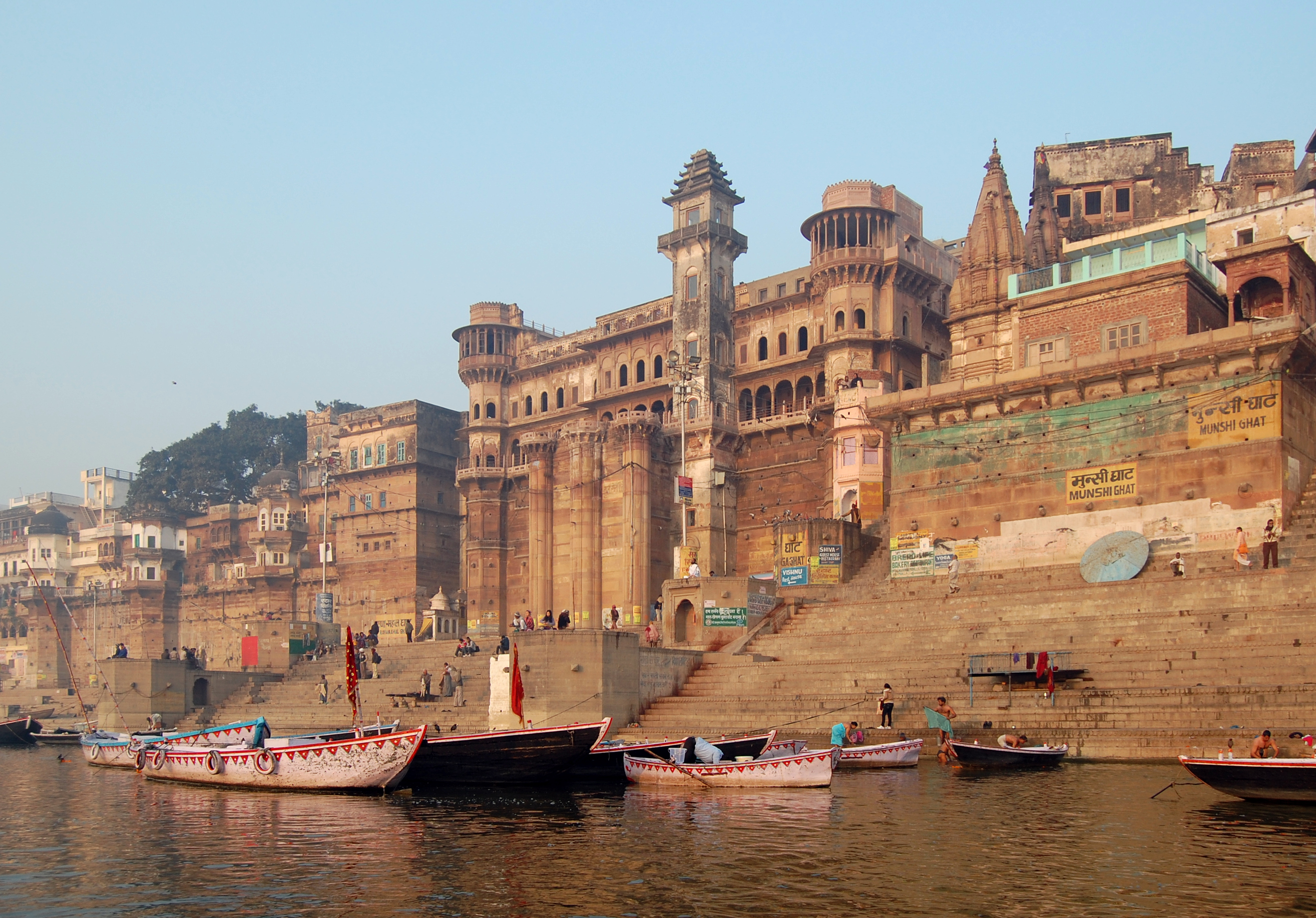
Varanasi, one of the oldest and holiest cities of Hinduism

==== Western and South Asia ====
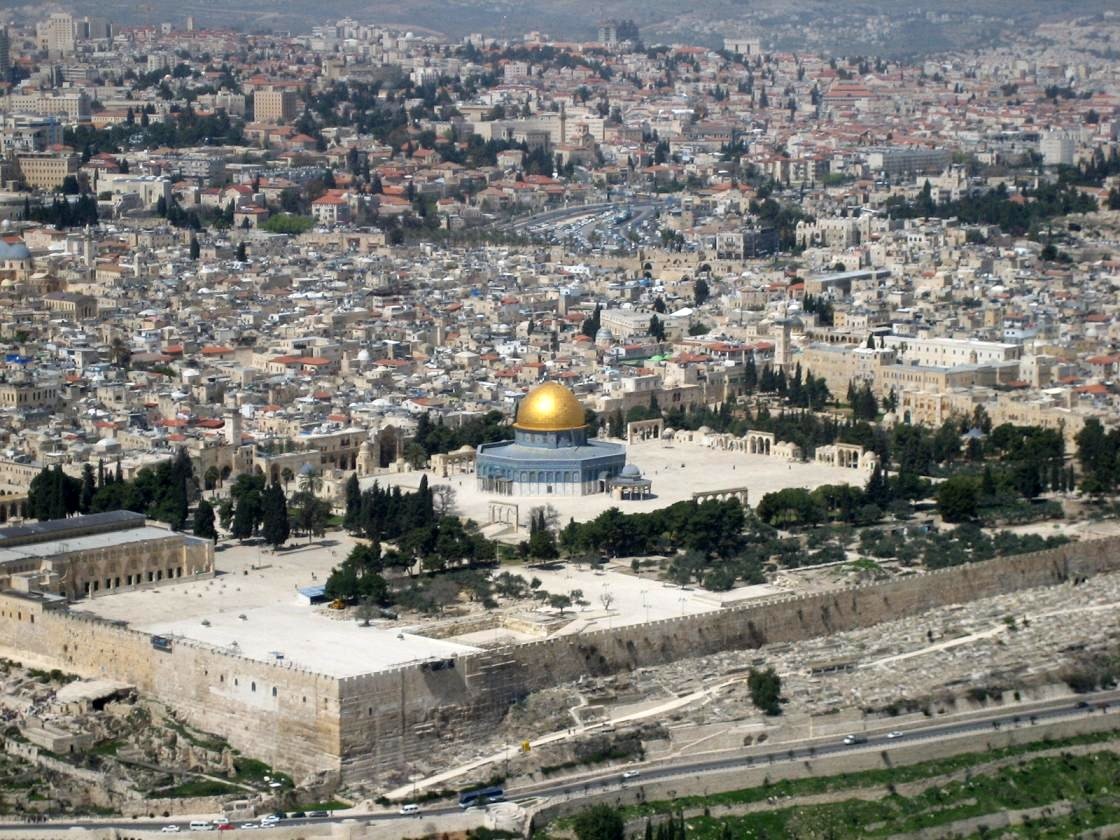
Temple Mount in Jerusalem, a holy city in Judaism, Christianity and Islam

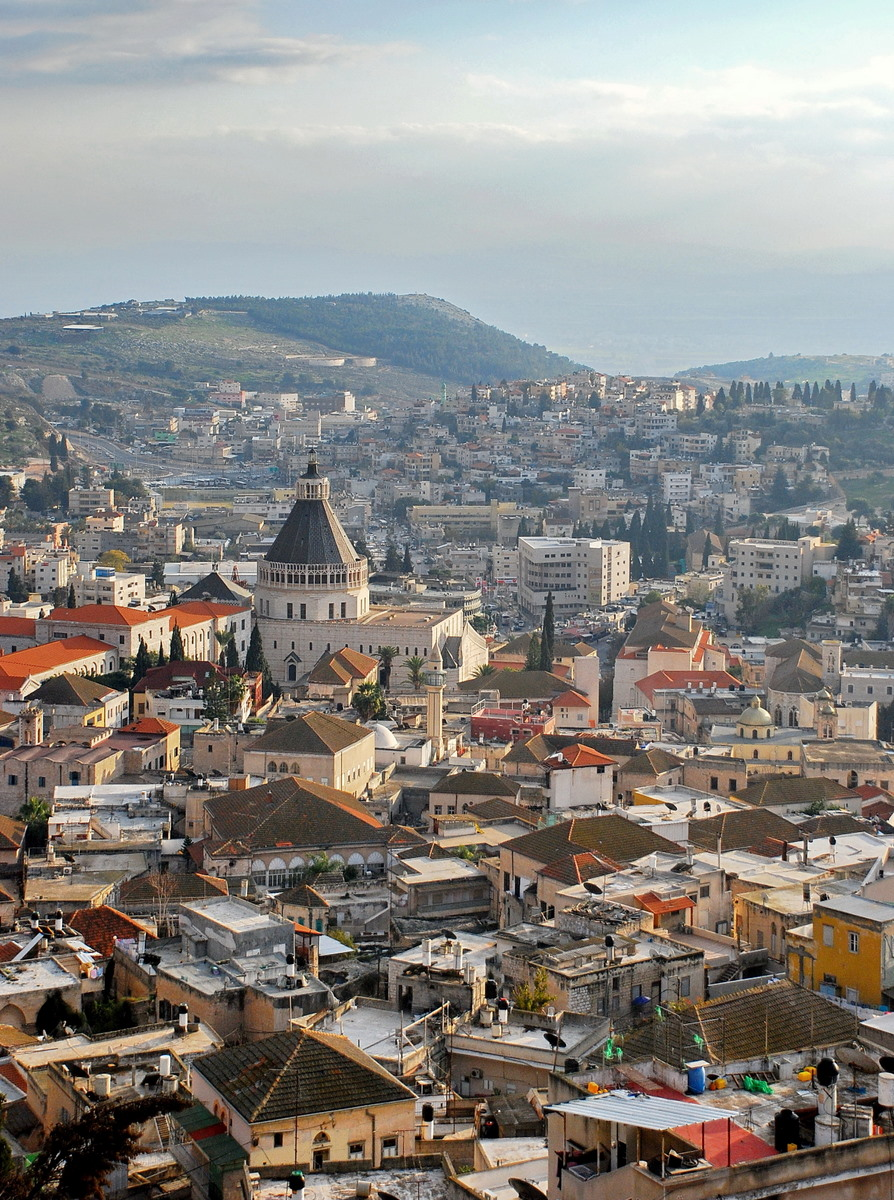
Nazareth, a holy city in Christianity

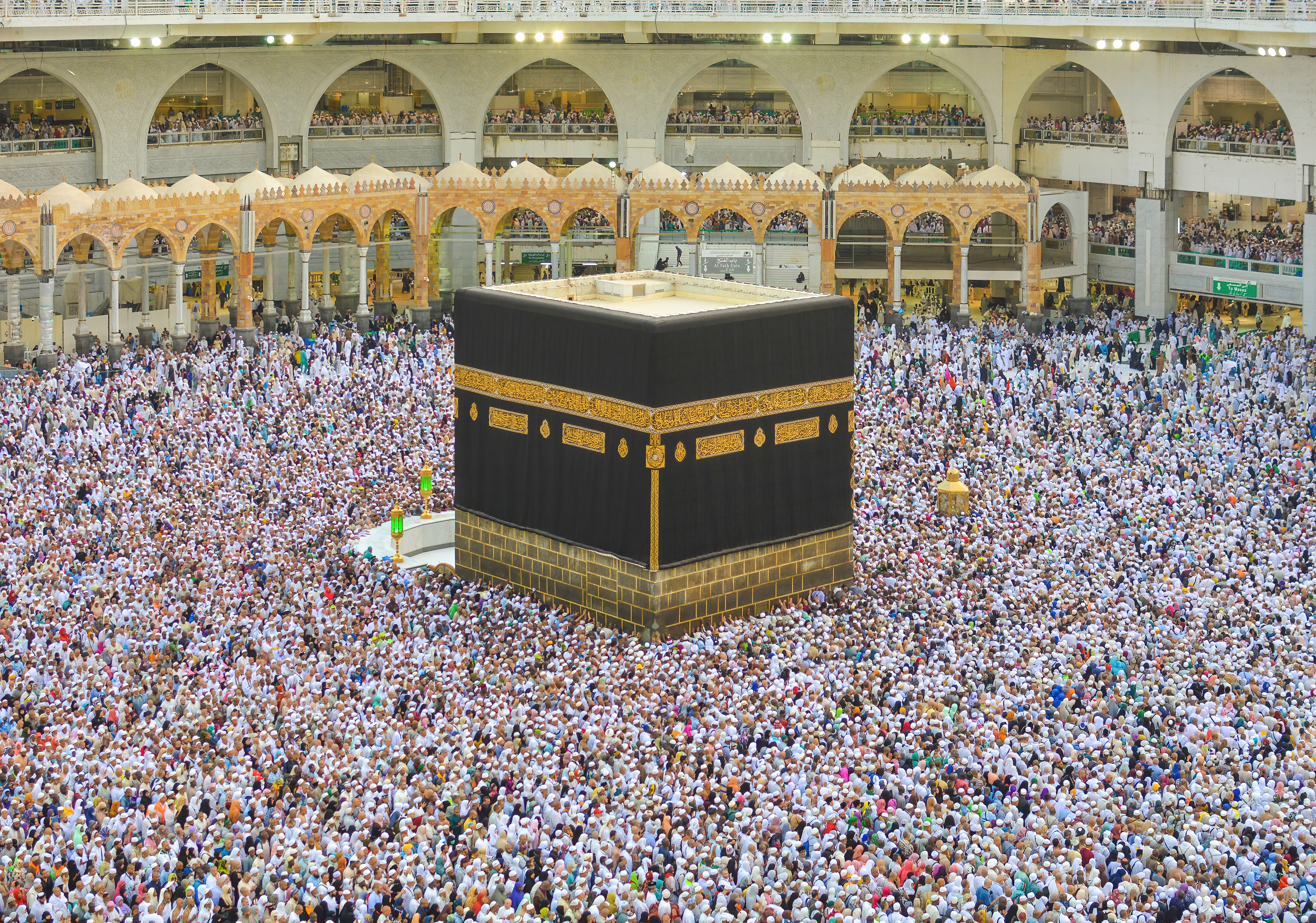
Kaaba in Mecca, the holiest city of Islam

City	Country	Religion(s)
Amritsar	India	Sikhism
Anandpur Sahib	India	Sikhism
Antakya (Antioch)	Turkey	Christianity
Ajmer	India	Islam
Ayodhya	India	Hinduism
Balkh	Afghanistan	Islam (Shia)
Beirut	Lebanon	Christianity
Bethlehem	Palestine	Christianity, Judaism
Bhaktapur	Nepal	Hinduism, Buddhism
Bodh Gaya	India	Buddhism, Hinduism
Dwarka	India	Hinduism
Haifa	Israel	Baháʼí Faith
Hebron	Palestine	Judaism, Islam
Hittin	Israel	Druze faith
Janakpur	Nepal	Hinduism
Jerusalem	Israel / Palestine (Status of Jerusalem)	Judaism, Christianity, Islam
Kanchipuram	India	Hinduism, Jainism, Buddhism
Haridwar	India	Hinduism
Karbala	Iraq	Islam (Shia)
Kathmandu	Nepal	Hinduism, Buddhism
Khalwat al-Bayada	Lebanon	Druze faith
Konya	Turkey	Islam (Sufi)
Kufa	Iraq	Islam (Shia)
Kushinagar	India	Buddhism
Lahore	Pakistan	Islam, Sikhism
Lalitpur	Nepal	Hinduism, Buddhism
Lumbini	Nepal	Buddhism, Hinduism
Mashhad	Iran	Islam (Shia)
Mathura	India	Hinduism
Mecca	Saudi Arabia	Islam
Medina	Saudi Arabia	Islam
Meron	Israel	Judaism
Mtskheta	(Georgia (country)) Georgia	Christianity
Nashik	India	Hinduism, Buddhism
Nablus	Palestine	Judaism, Samaritanism
Najaf	Iraq	Islam (Shia)
Nankana Sahib	Pakistan	Sikhism
Nazareth	Israel	Christianity
Prayagraj	India	Hinduism
Qom	Iran	Islam (Shia)
Safed	Israel	Judaism
Şanlıurfa (Urfa, Edessa)	Turkey	Christianity, Islam (Sufi)
Sarnath	India	Buddhism
Tiberias	Israel	Judaism
Tripoli	Lebanon	Christianity
Vagharshapat	Armenia	Christianity (Armenian Apostolic Church)
Varanasi	India	Hinduism, Buddhism
Yazd	Iran	Zoroastrianism

==== Central and East Asia ====
City	Country	Religion(s)
Beigang	Taiwan	Folk religion
Dajia	Taiwan	Folk religion
Ise	Japan	Shinto
Kyoto	Japan	Buddhism, Shinto
Tenri	Japan	Tenrikyo
Lhasa	China	Buddhism
Turkistan	Kazakhstan	Islam (Sufi)

==== Southeast Asia ====
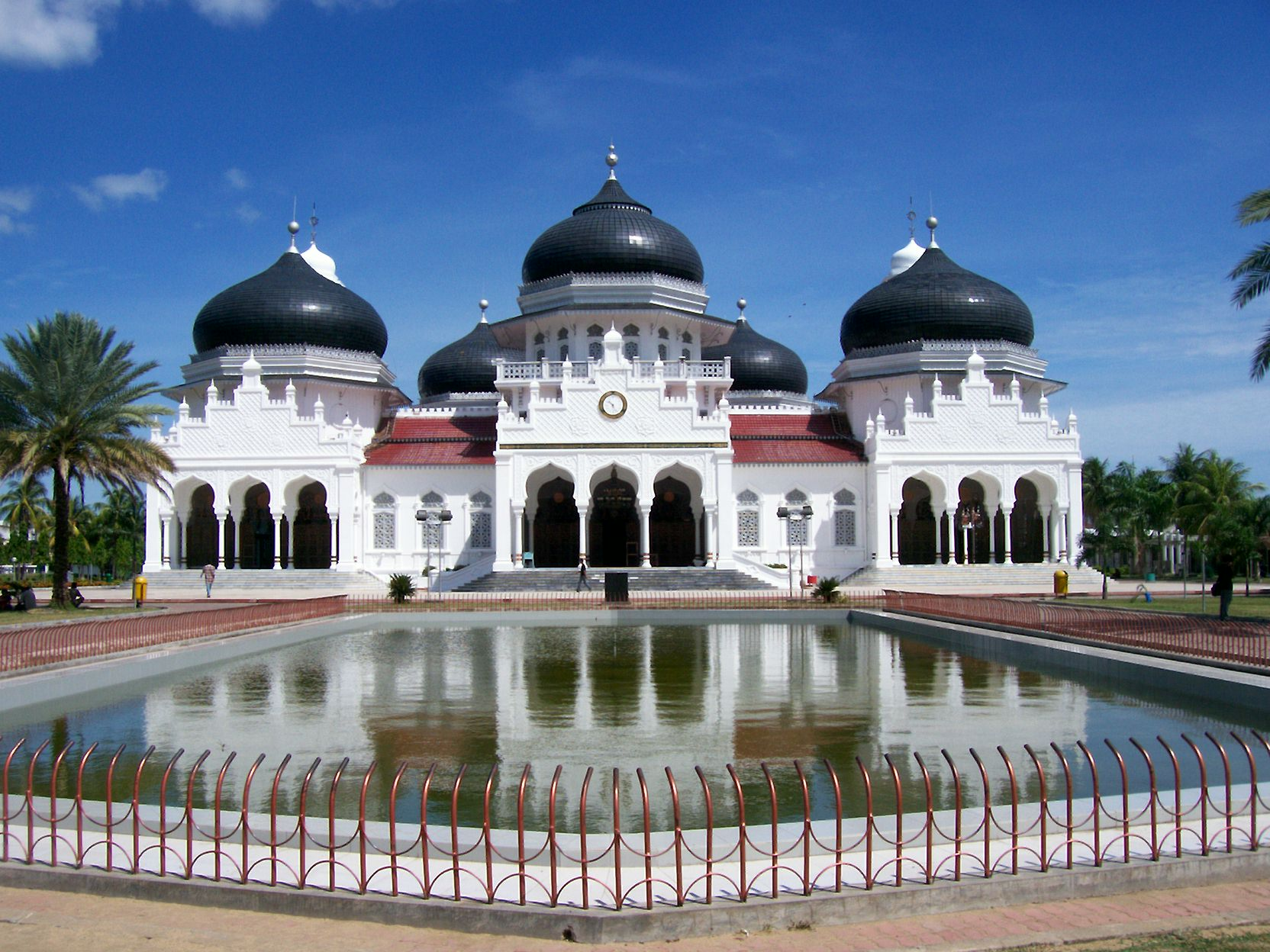
Baiturrahman Grand Mosque in Banda Aceh, symbol of Islamic sharia law's application in Aceh

City	Country	Religion(s)
Antipolo, Rizal	Philippines	Christianity (Roman Catholicism)
Besakih	Indonesia	Balinese Hinduism
Cebu City	Philippines	Christianity (Roman Catholicism)
Cigugur	Indonesia	Sunda Wiwitan
El Salvador, Misamis Oriental	Philippines	Christianity (Roman Catholicism)
Iloilo City	Philippines	Christianity
Manaoag, Pangasinan	Philippines	Christianity (Roman Catholicism)
Mandalay	Myanmar	Buddhism
Naga, Camarines Sur	Philippines	Christianity (Roman Catholicism)
Siem Reap	Cambodia	Buddhism, Hinduism

=== Europe ===
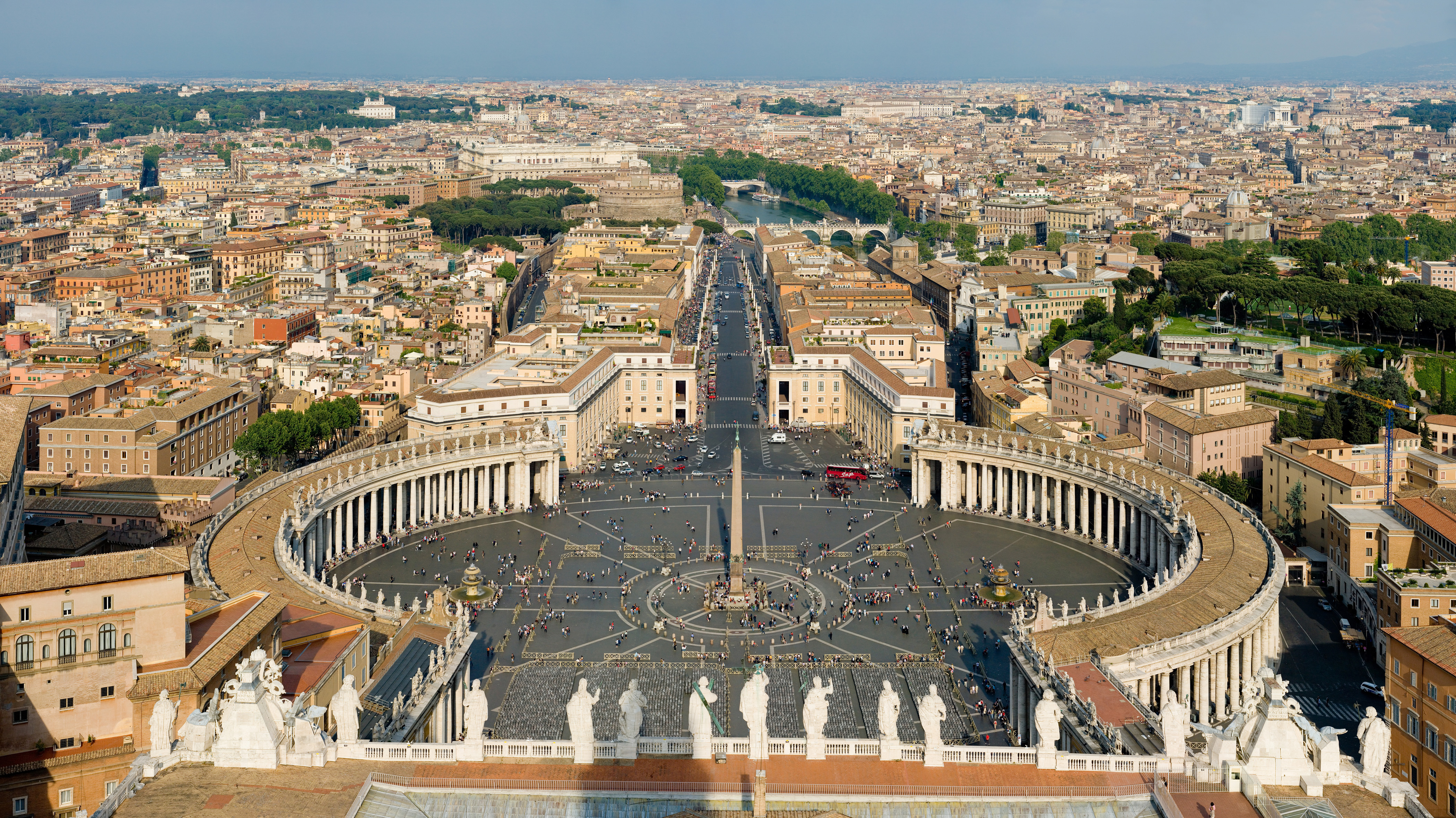
St Peter's Square, Vatican City.

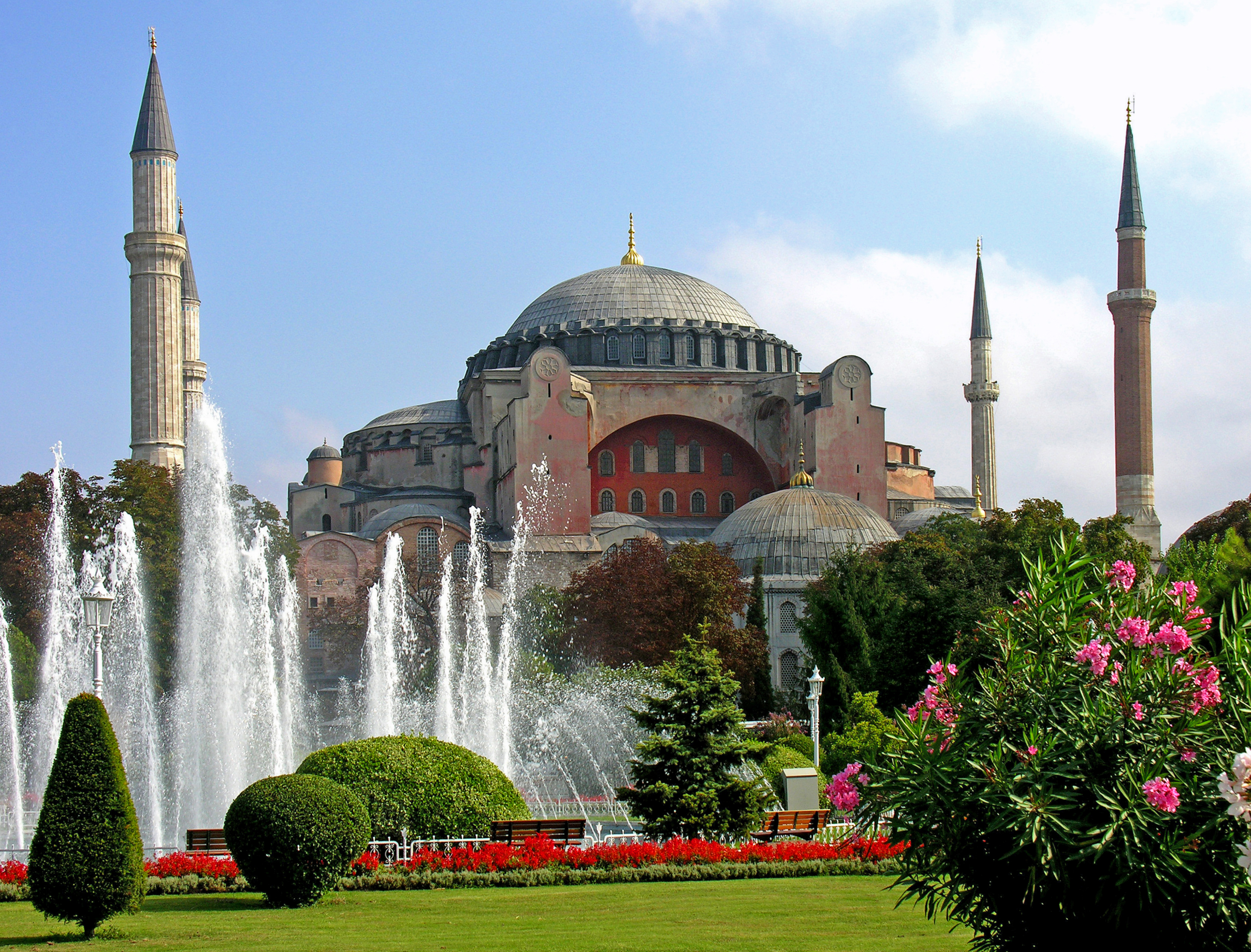
Hagia Sophia, Istanbul.

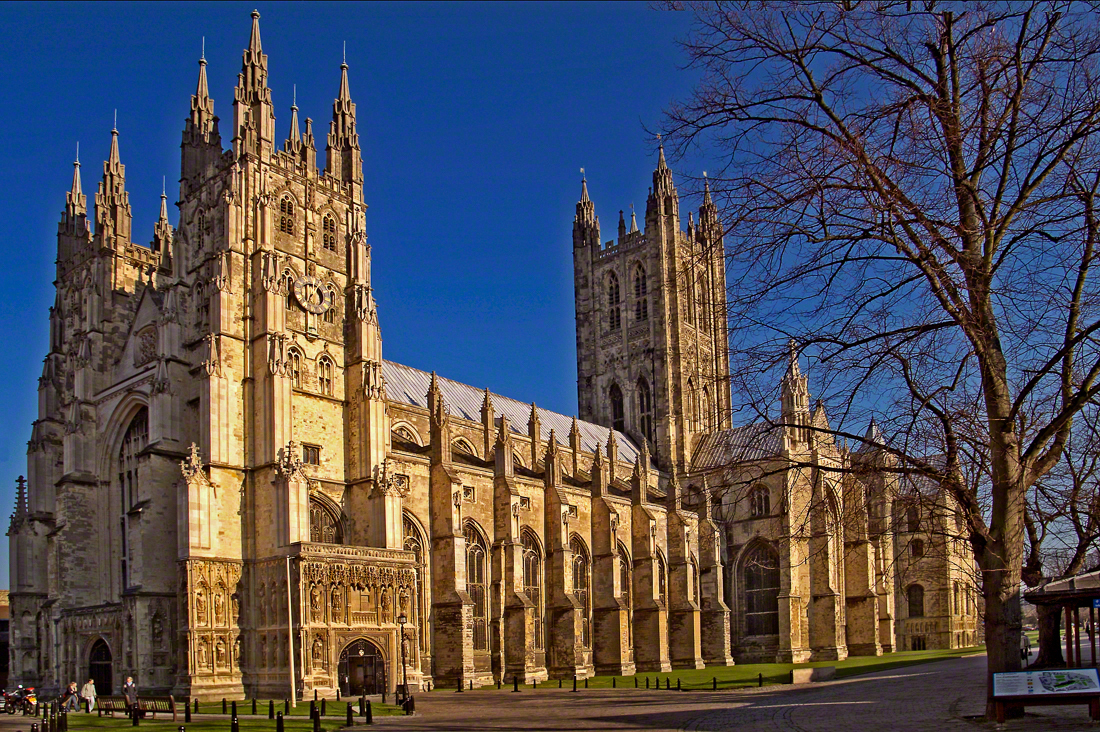
Canterbury Cathedral.

City	Country	Religion(s)
Assisi	Italy	Christianity
Athens	Greece	Christianity, Hellenism
Avila	Spain	Christianity
Barcelona	Spain	Christianity
Canterbury	England, United Kingdom	Christianity (Anglicanism)
Caravaca de la Cruz	Spain	Christianity
Cologne	Germany	Christianity
Corinth	Greece	Christianity
Częstochowa	Poland	Christianity (Roman Catholicism)
Fátima	Portugal	Christianity
Glastonbury	England, United Kingdom	Christianity, Druidry
Istanbul (Constantinople)	Turkey	Christianity (Eastern Orthodoxy)
Kilkenny	(Republic of Ireland) Ireland	Christianity
Kraljevo	Serbia	Christianity
Lourdes	France	Christianity (Roman Catholicism)
Madrid	Spain	Christianity
Marija Bistrica	Croatia	Christianity
Medjugorje	Bosnia and Herzegovina	Christianity
Milan	Italy	Christianity
Moscow	Russia	Christianity (Russian Orthodox Church)
Munich	Bavaria, Germany	Christianity
Veliky Novgorod	(Veliky Novgorod) Russia	Christianity
Ohrid	North Macedonia	Christianity
Paris	France	Christianity
Prague	Czech Republic	Christianity
Rome	Italy	Christianity
Santiago de Compostela	Spain	Christianity
Santo Toribio de Liébana	Spain	Christianity
Sergiyev Posad	Russia	Christianity
Thessaloniki, Mount Athos	Greece	Christianity (Greek Orthodox Church)
Toledo	Spain	Christianity
Trondheim	Norway	Christianity
Uman	Ukraine	Breslov, Hasidic, Judaism
Uppsala	Sweden	Christianity, Norse Paganism
Vatican City	Vatican City	Christianity (Roman Catholicism)
Varallo Sesia	Piedmont, Italy	Christianity (Roman Catholicism)
Vladimir	Russia	Christianity
Walsingham	England, United Kingdom	Christianity
Warsaw	Poland	Christianity
Wittenberg	Germany	Christianity (Lutheranism)
York	England, United Kingdom	Christianity (Anglicanism)

=== North America ===
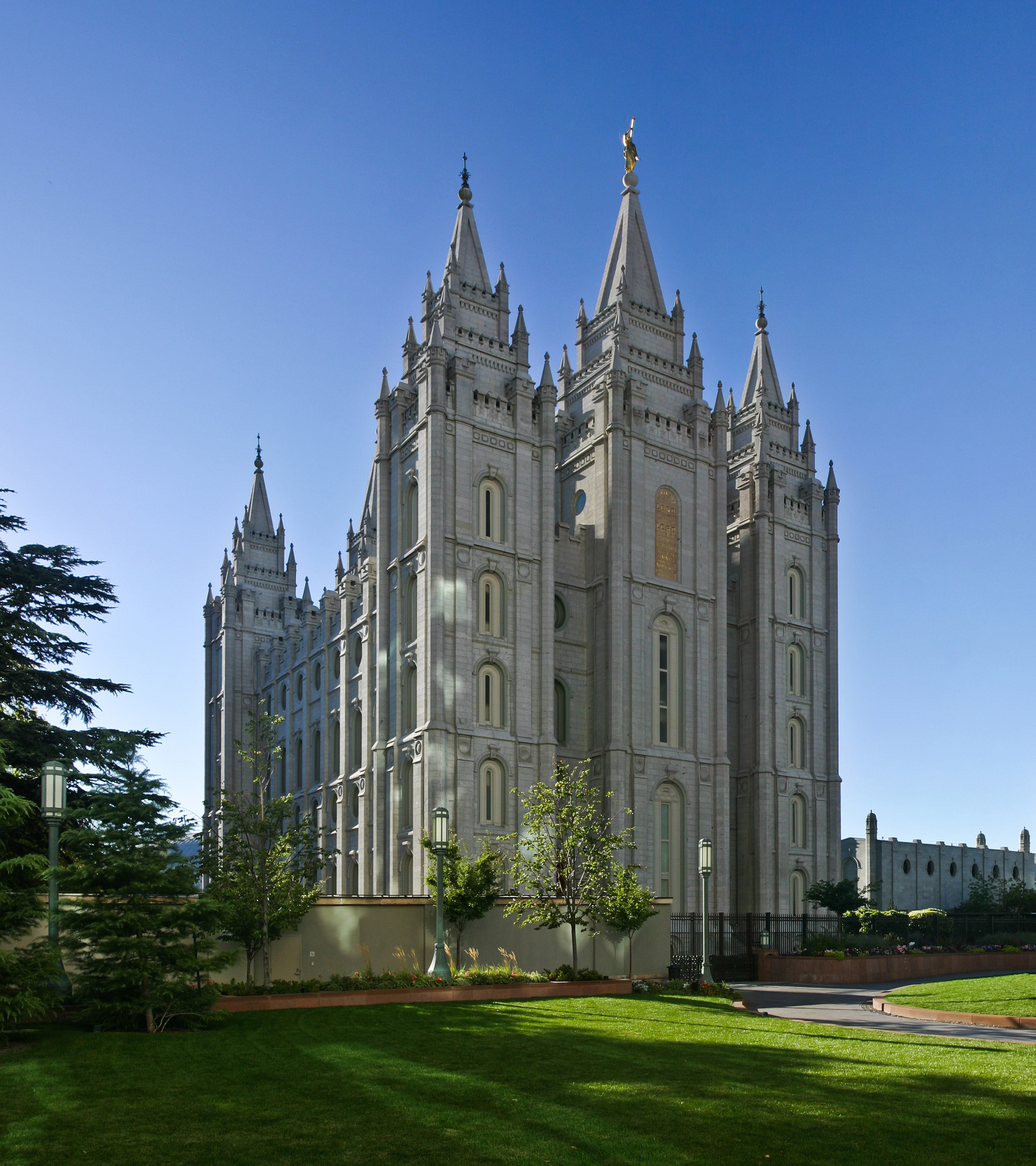
The Salt Lake Temple in Salt Lake City.

City	Country	Religion(s)
Clearwater, Florida	United States	Church of Scientology
Mexico City	Mexico	Christianity
Quebec City	Canada	Christianity
Salt Lake City	United States	Latter Day Saint movement
Siparia	Trinidad and Tobago	Christianity, Hinduism

=== South America ===
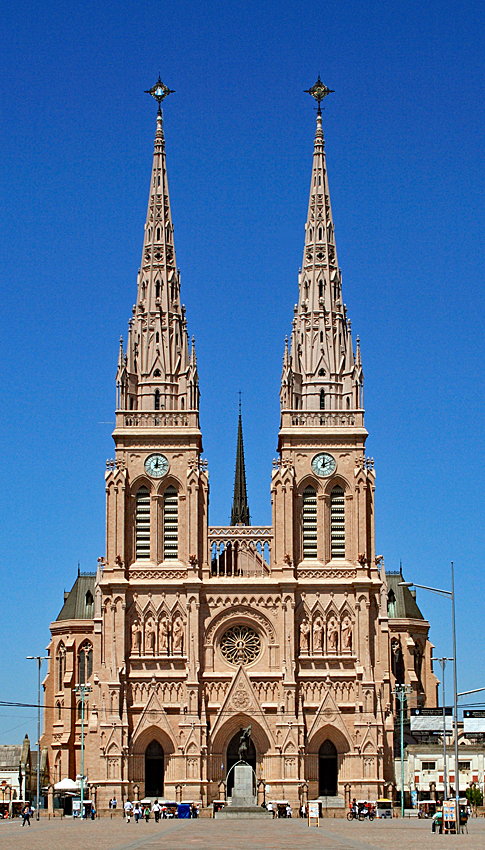
The Basilica of Our Lady of Luján.

City	Country	Religion(s)
Aparecida	Brazil	Christianity
Luján	Argentina	Christianity

== See also ==
- Ecclesiastical capital
- Pilgrimage
- Four Holy Cities (Judaism)
