= Charles Kisolokele =

Congolese politician and key member of Kimbanguist Church (1914–1992)

Charles Daniel Kisolokele Lukelo

Minister of Parastatals of the Republic of the Congo
- In office February 1961 – July 1961

Personal details
- Born: Charles Daniel Kisolokele; February 12, 1914 Nkamba, Belgian Congo
- Died: March 17, 1992 (aged 78) Brussels, Belgium
- Party: Alliance des Bakongo
- Parent: Simon Kimbangu

Charles Daniel Kisolokele Lukelo (1914 – 17 March 1992) was a Congolese politician and a key member of the Kimbanguist Church. He was appointed a minister of state in the first Congolese government and later served as Minister of Parastatals and Minister of Work and Social Welfare.

== Early life ==
Charles Daniel Kisolokele was born in 1914 in Nkamba, Belgian Congo, the eldest son of Simon Kimbangu. Simon Kimbangu was the founder of Kimbanguism, a Christian-inspired religious movement that provoked the ire of Belgian missionaries. When the colonial authorities attempted to arrest him in June 1921, he fled into the bush with Kisolokele and some of his own followers. Kisolokele spent six years in primary school and three years in middle school, the latter in the Colonie scolaire de Boma. Following two years of service as an instructor at the school, Kisolokele became an agent of the public works department of the colonial administration in Maduda. He worked there for 30 years.

== Political career ==
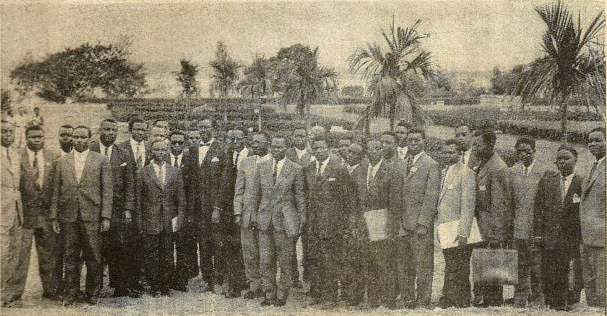
First Congolese government

Kisolokele was elected to the Chamber of Deputies with 733 preferential votes as a member of the Alliance des Bakongo (ABAKO) party in the Congo's first election in 1960, representing the Cataractes District. He was appointed to serve in the first government of the independent Congo under Prime Minister Patrice Lumumba as a minister of state. The government was invested by Parliament on 24 June. On 20 July Kisolokele withdrew his parliamentary mandate in the Chamber. Lumumba's successor, Joseph Iléo, retained him in his government in September. In Iléo's second government in February 1961 he was appointed Minister of Parastatals. In April he became the vice-president of the provincial government of Kongo Central. In July he became Minister of Work and Social Welfare. On 6 December 1969 he was appointed President of the Institut National de Preparation Professionnelle. He was installed in a formal ceremony on 12 January 1970.

== Later life ==
In 1972, during the height of Zaire's Authenticité policy, Kisolokele changed his name to Kisolokele Lukelo (lukelo meaning "it is revealed now"). He died on 17 March 1992 at a hospital in Brussels. On the tenth anniversary of Kisolokele's death Kimbanguists from across Europe gathered in Brussels to commemorate the occasion. They met with 12 grandchildren of Simon Kimbangu to hold a celebration. A small group of people toured the hospital room where Kisolokele died.
