= Marcel Maquet =

Belgian colonial administrator

Marcel Alphonse Joseph Maquet

Commissioner of Stanleyville
- In office 18 November 1940 – 10 March 1943
- Preceded by: Rodolphe Dufour
- Succeeded by: Bertrand

Governor of Léopoldville
- In office 1943–1945
- Preceded by: Albert-Émile de Beauffort
- Succeeded by: Léon Morel

Personal details
- Born: 1 November 1891 Huy, Liège Province, Belgium
- Died: 10 September 1964 (aged 72) Eprave, near Rochefort, Belgium

Marcel Maquet (1 November 1891 – 10 September 1964) was a Belgian colonial administrator who became commissioner of Stanleyville Province in 1940, then governor of Léopoldville Province in 1943.

== Early years (1891–1919) ==
Marcel Alphonse Joseph Maquet was born in Huy, Liège Province, Belgium on 1 November 1891. His parents were Alfred Maquet and Céline Lomba. In 1913 he obtained his bachelor's degree in Commercial and Consular Sciences from the University of Liège. During World War I (1914–1918) he was mobilized on 29 July 1914 in the 14th line regiment. He took part in the fighting near Liège. He was made a prisoner at Boncelles and was taken to Germany. After the war he studied at the colonial school and was admitted as a colonial administrator 2nd class.

== Junior colonial administrator (1919–1930) ==
Maquet began his service in Boma on 19 June 1919, and was assigned to the Yokolo Territory in Équateur Province. He managed to calm a troubled region where the factoreries had burned the land and destroyed the culture. The authorities and the local people appreciated his sense of diplomacy and his composure. He was promoted to territorial administrator 1st class in 1922, assistant district commissioner in 1925, chef de service of Indigenous Affairs and Labor (Affaires indigènes et Main-d'œuvre, AIMO) in 1927 and director-general of AIMO in 1931. He helped organize the chiefdoms and the workforce, improved the roads and developed cotton cultivation in Équateur. He suggested regulation for the copal trade.

Maquet married Jeanne Maquet-Tombu (1893–1978), who accompanied him to the Congo in 1930. She was known as a pastel artist, had a doctorate in Art History and Archeology and was also an author. In 1936 her book Le siècle marche won the Triennial Prize for Colonial Literature. Maquet conducted ethnographic inquiries into Bokanja and Bolanda in the Bokungu Territory in 1925. He and Martin De Ryck (Note: Martin De Ryck later became Governor of Equateur Province from February 1951 to July 1954.) conducted an ethnographic inquiry in Lionje in the Boende Territory in 1926/1930.

== District commissioner (1939–1940) ==
Macquet was made district commissioner 2nd class on 1 January 1930. In 1933 he was appointed the principal district commissioner in Léopoldville. Macquet took an interest in locally made ivory carvings and tools, some dating to the pre-colonial period, and later wrote about them in the journal of the Musée de la vie indigène in Leopoldville.

In a letter of 5 December 1939 to Governor General Pierre Ryckmans Maquet opposed clemency for former leaders of the Kimbanguist movement had converted to the Salvation Army, since they distorted the teachings of the Salvation Army in their speeches to large crowds, and continued to support the movement. On 20 December 1939 vice-governor Paul Ermens wrote to Maquet about the relegation of Simon-Pierre Mpadi before the opening of the Agricultural Colony of Boende. He said Mpadi was one of the main leaders of the "Mission des Noirs", many of whose members were former Kimbanguists. They were concealing xenophobic views behind a pretense of loyalty to the authorities but a desire for autonomy of their church. This was considered very dangerous.

== Provincial commissioner / governor (1940–1945) ==
Maquet was appointed commissioner of Stanleyville Province on 18 November 1940, replacing Rodolphe Dufour. In 1941 the title was changed to governor of Stanleyville Province. He was responsible for a province where a large number of colonial troops were stationed with a view to possible intervention in Abyssinia. Some of the Europeans were angry at the delay in taking action, but Maquet and General Auguste Gilliaert managed to calm the situation. As in Équateur, Maquet made social and economic improvements in Stanleyville.

In March 1943 Maquet was recalled to take over the government of the Léopoldville province. He left Stanleyville on 10 March 1943, replaced by Alexis Bertrand. He replaced Albert-Émile de Beauffort as governor of Léopoldville Province. He left this position in 1945, and was replaced in 1946 by Léon Morel. He retired on 27 December 1945.

== Later career (1945–1960) ==
After retiring from active service, Maquet became a member of the Colonial Council in 1946, vice-president of the Office of African Cities and permanent member of the UNESCO commission in Belgium. He returned to the Congo for several expert missions between 1948 and 1958. He died in Eprave, near Rochefort, Belgium on 10 September 1964.

== Publications ==
- Marcel Maquet (October 1937), "Les populations des environs de Léopoldville", Congo, II (3)
- Marcel Maquet (October 1939), "Sur les flancs du Pic Sorensen", Revue Congo, Brux.: Goemare
- Marcel Maquet (1939), "Notes sur la poterie Kakongo", Brousse (2)
- Marcel Maquet (1 January 1946), "Un autre aspect de l'effort de guerre du Congo", Revue coloniale belge, 1ère année (6)
- Marcel Maquet (1 March 1946), "L'évolution des indigènes au Congo belge", Revue coloniale belge, 1ère année (10), Brux.
- Marcel Maquet (March–April 1947), "La politique monétaire au Congo belge pendant la guerre", Société Belge d'Études et d'Expansion, 46e année (125), Liège
- Marcel Maquet (1947), "Une initiative à encourager", Brousse (Série de six chromos Liebig sur les artisans d'art au Congo) (3–4), Léopoldville
- Marcel Maquet (1948), "A propos de quelques métiers et ateliers d'artindigène du Ruanda et du Congo", Brousse (3–4), Léopoldville
- Marcel Maquet (September–October 1949), "Le plan décennal pour ledéveloppement économique et social du Congo belge", Energie (94–95), Brux.
- Marcel Maquet (1 March 1949), "L'Unesco et les territoires non autonomes ou sous tutelle", Revue coloniale belge, 4e année (82), Brux.
- Marcel Maquet (March–April 1950), "De l'assistance technique auxpays insuffisamment développés", Jeune Afrique, 4e année (10), Elisabethville
- Marcel Maquet (March 1952), "Un centre international d'éducation de base en Afrique Noire", Zaïre, 6 (3), Brux-
- Marcel Maquet (January–February 1953), Un nouvel institut d'émission au Congo belge, vol. 52e année, Liège: Société belge d'études et d'expansion

== Sources ==
- Boudart, Laurence (2014), "Un voyage au pays des popoghages…" (PDF), Carnets revue électronique d'études françaises (in French), 1: 27–44
- "Congo (Kinshasa) Provinces", Rulers.org
- Laude, N. (28 March 1966), "MAQUET (Marcel-Alphonse-Joseph)" (PDF), Biographie Belge d'Outre-Mer, vol. VI, Acad. Roy. Scienc. d'Outre-Mer, p. col. 688–690
- Raymaekers, Jan (21 March 2017), The Musée de la vie indigène in Leopoldville (PDF), Royal Academy for Overseas Sciences
- Vinck, Honoré (1991), "Enquetes Ethnologiques (1920-60) dans les Archives Aequatoria", Annales Aequatoria (in French), 12, Honoré Vinck: 554–561, JSTOR 25836997
- Zana Etambala, Mathieu (2005), "L'armee Du Salut Et La Naissance De La 'mission Des Noirs' Au Congo Belge, 1934 – 1940", Annales Aequatoria (in French), 26, Honoré Vinck: 67–164, JSTOR 25836854
