= List of governors of Orientale Province =

Belgian Congo provinces in 1920

Belgian Congo provinces in 1933 after Costermansville (later Kivu) and Stanleyville (Orientale) had been split

This list of governors of Orientale Province includes governors or equivalent officerholders of the original Orientale Province created in the Belgian Congo in 1913, and of the successor provinces until the 2015 break-up of the province into the provinces of Bas-Uélé, Haut-Uélé, Ituri and Tshopo.

Orientale Province was divided in 1933 into Costermansville Province (later Kivu Province) and Stanleyville Province. Stanleyville Province was renamed Orientale Province from 1947 to 1963, when it was broken up into Kibali-Ituri, Uélé and Haut-Congo provinces. Orientale Province was reconstituted in 1966. It was renamed Haut-Zaïre Province from 1971–1997, then returned to the name of Orientale Province from 1997 to 2015.

== First period (1913–1963) ==
The governors or equivalent of Orientale Province and Stanleyville Province from 1913 to 1963 were:

Province	Start	End	Officeholder	Title
Orientale	7 November 1913	5 July 1916	Justin Malfeyt (1862–1924)	Deputy governor-general
Orientale	July 1916	August 1917	Alexis Bertrand (1870–1946)	Interim deputy governor-general
Orientale	15 August 1917	1925	Adolphe De Meulemeester (1870–1944)	Deputy governor-general
Orientale	1925	26 September 1926	Adolphe De Meulemeester	Governor and deputy governor-general
Orientale	9 October 1926	30 September 1933	Alfred Alphonse Moeller (1889–1971)	Governor and deputy governor-general
Stanleyville	1 October 1933	18 November 1940	Rodolphe Dufour	Commissioner
Stanleyville	18 November 1940	10 March 1943	Marcel Maquet (1891–1964)	Commissioner, then Governor from 1941
Stanleyville	10 March 1943	15 May 1945	R. Bertrand	Governor
Stanleyville	1 June 1945	29 June 1950	Ernest Bock (1st time) (1894–1952)	Governor (from 1947 of Orientale Province)
Orientale	1 October 1950	8 October 1951	Joseph-Paul Brasseur (1899–1956)	Governor
Orientale	8 October 1951	10 December 1952	Ernest Bock (2nd time)	Governor
Orientale	13 March 1953	13 March 1954	Luc Breuls de Tiecken (b. 1900)	Governor
Orientale	30 March 1954	1 July 1958	André Schöller (b. 1908)	Governor
Orientale	22 December 1958	11 June 1960	Pierre Leroy (1909–1985)	Governor
Independence 30 June 1960
Orientale	11 June 1960	11 October 1960	Jean-Pierre Finant (d. 1961)	President
Orientale	1960	December 1960	Charles Badjoko	President
Orientale	9 December 1960	25 October 1961	Jean Foster Manzikala	President
Orientale	25 October 1961	27 July 1962	Simon Losala	President
Orientale	20 August 1962	March 1963	Joseph Ekombe	Extraordinary commissioner

== Successor provinces (1963–1966) ==
Between 1963 and 1966 Orientale was broken up into the Kibali-Ituri, Uélé and Haut-Congo provinces.

=== Kibali-Ituri ===
The head of Kibali-Ituri Province was:

Start	End	Officeholder	Title
September 1962	28 December 1966	Jean Foster Manzikala	President (from 1965, governor)

=== Uélé ===
The heads of Uélé Province were:

Start	End	Officeholder	Title
11 September 1962	May 1965	Paul Mambaya	President
6 July 1965	28 December 1966	François Kupa	Governor

=== Haut-Congo ===
The heads of Haut-Congo Province were:

Start	End	Officeholder	Title
March 1963	8 September 1963	Marcel Tshishiku	Extraordinary commissioner
June 1963	26 June 1963	Georges Grenfell (b. 1908)	President
26 June 1963	1964	Paul Isombuma	President
1964	5 August 1964	François Aradjabu	Extraordinary commissioner-general for the former province of Haut-Congo
16 September 1964	November 1964	Alphonse Abikwa	President
November 1964	5 November 1966	Ignace Michel Alamazani	President (from 1965, governor)
5 November 1966	28 December 1966	Pierre Efomi	Governor

== Second period (1966–2015) ==
The governors or equivalent of Orientale Province and Haut-Zaïre Province from 1966 to 2015 were:

Province	Start	End	Officeholder	Title
Orientale	28 December 1966	3 January 1967	Jean Foster Manzikala	Governor
Orientale	3 January 1967	17 July 1967	Vital Faustin Moanda (b. 1923)	Governor
Orientale	30 August 1967	9 August 1968	Michel Denge	Governor
Orientale	9 August 1968	19 October 1968	Jonas Mukamba (b. 1931)	Governor
Orientale	19 October 1968	5 August 1969	Anaclet Kaniki	Governor
Orientale	5 August 1969	8 December 1970	Édouard Bulundwe (b. 1932)	Governor
Orientale	23 December 1970	24 February 1972	Bernard Ndebo	Governor
Haut-Zaïre	24 February 1972	17 September 1972	Geyoro Te Kule	Commissioner
Haut-Zaïre	17 September 1972	10 February 1976	Assumani Busanya Lukili	Commissioner
Haut-Zaïre	10 February 1976	21 January 1978	Konde Vila Kikanda	Commissioner
Haut-Zaïre	21 January 1978	18 January 1980	Mabolia Inongo Tra Buato	Commissioner
Haut-Zaïre	18 January 1980	27 August 1980	Tshiala Mwana Tshingombe	Commissioner
Haut-Zaïre	27 August 1980	10 October 1981	Mbenza Tubi	Governor
Haut-Zaïre	10 October 1981	23 January 1982	Ntikala Ibole Moludiki	Governor
Haut-Zaïre	23 January 1982	1 January 1985	Sukadi Bulayi	Governor
Haut-Zaïre	1 January 1985	20 July 1988	Salumu Amisi	Governor
Haut-Zaïre	20 July 1988	11 January 1990	Sampasa Kaweta Milombe (1944–2006)	Governor
Haut-Zaïre	11 January 1990	March 1991	Guillaume Samba Kaputo (1946–2007)	Governor
Haut-Zaïre	3 March 1991	14 March 1997	Lombeya Bosongo	Governor
Orientale	23 March 1997	23 August 1998	Jean Yagi Sitolo	Governor
Orientale	26 September 1998	6 December 1998	Luthia Jean Bene Kabala	Governor
Orientale	23 December 1998	20 July 2000	Théo Baruti (1st time)	Governor (in rebellion)
Orientale	20 July 2000	20 April 2001	Justin Yogba	Governor (in rebellion)
Orientale	20 April 2001	16 May 2004	Jean-Pierre Bilusa	Governor (in rebellion)
Orientale	May 2002		Noël Obotela Rashidi	Governor
Orientale	26 May 2004	15 November 2005	Théo Baruti (2nd time)	Governor
Orientale	15 November 2005	24 February 2007	Jean-Pierre Lola Kisanga (b. 1969)	Governor
Orientale	24 February 2007	5 March 2012	Médard Autsai Asenga (b. 1942)	Governor
Orientale	5 March 2012	5 February 2013	Ismaël Arama Ndiama (acting)	Governor
Orientale	5 February 2013	29 October 2015	Jean Bamanisa Saïdi (b. 1964)	Governor

== See also ==
- Lists of provincial governors of the Democratic Republic of the Congo
