= Adolphe De Meulemeester =

Belgian soldier and colonial administrator

Interim Governor of Katanga Province
- In office 1915–1917
- Succeeded by: General Charles Tombeur

Deputy governor-general of Orientale Province
- In office 15 August 1917 – 22 June 1926
- Preceded by: Justin Malfeyt; Alexis Bertrand (interim)
- Succeeded by: Alfred Moeller

Personal details
- Born: 28 March 1870 Ghent, Belgium
- Died: 10 May 1944 (aged 74) Brussels, Belgium
- Occupation: Soldier and colonial administrator

Adolphe De Meulemeester (28 March 1870 – 10 May 1944) was a Belgian soldier and colonial administrator. He was deputy governor-general and then governor of the Orientale Province of the Belgian Congo from 1917 to 1926. He introduced many innovations including a road network, schools and clinics, chiefdom and sector councils, and cotton plantations.

== Early years (1870–1895) ==
Adolphe-Jean-Marîe-Ghislain De Meulemeester was born in Ghent, Belgium, on 28 March 1870. His parents were Victor-Charles de Meulemeester and Marie-Thérèse Cavens. He studied at the Saint Armand Institute in Ghent, the Jesuit College in Brussels and the Joséphites College in Leuven (Louvain). On 4 May 1885 he enlisted as a volunteer in the army and entered the Carabiniers military school in Wavre. In 1889 he entered the Military Academy, and was among the leading students when he graduated and was posted on 29 December 1893 to the 1st Line Regiment in Ghent.

== Belgian Congo (1895–1926) ==
On 6 November 1895 De Meulemeester embarked at Antwerp for Léopoldville. During his first term of duty he commanded the Public Force Company of the Bangala District at Nouvelle-Anvers. He became ill, and returned to Belgium on 22 January 1899. He was promoted to captain-commander and left Belgium for the Congo on 11 November 1899. He was given the mission of pacifying the Budja people, who were said to be cannibalistic, and managed to restore order in the Mongala District. Although suffering from hematuria, he went to Bas-Congo and took command of the Cataractes District, where he built a 21 kilometres (13 mi) road between Tumba and Kitobola.

During his third term from 31 May 1903 to 27 March 1906 De Meulemeester was district commissioner 1st class, then commissioner general as of 13 November 1904. He was in charge of the Eastern Province District (district de la province Orientale). He continued this function in his fourth term, from 5 August 1907 to 3 April 1910. De Meulemeester was promoted to State Inspector on 12 January 1911, and on 4 March 1911 was appointed permanent inspector of the Stanleyville, Uélé and Aruwimi districts. During World War I (1914–1918) from 1914 to 1915 he was permanent inspector of the Kasaï-Sankuru districts. He returned to Belgium in 1915 to rejoin the Belgian army, but instead was assigned to Elisabethville to serve as interim governor of Katanga Province in the absence of General Charles Tombeur, who was engaged in operations in East Africa.

On 5 August 1917 De Meulemeester was promoted to deputy governor-general and sent in this role to Stanleyville. At this time the former Eastern Province District had been expanded to include Haut-Uélé, Bas-Uélé and Aruwimi. He replaced Alexis Bertrand, interim governor after Justin Malfeyt had left office as deputy governor-general of Orientale Province in July 1916. De Meulemeester took office on 15 August 1917. In 1925 his title was upgraded to governor and deputy governor-general.

De Meulemeester was responsible for the controversial development of a road network in Orientale Province, and for development of cotton cultivation. He started the first native courts, and the first councils of chiefdoms and sectors, giving the local people some say in managing their own affairs. These would be formalized by decrees of 1926 and 1933, and would spread across the Congo. He established rural dispensaries and promoted expansion of primary and vocational schools for the local people. He had great tenacity in implementing his plans for the province, and was constantly on the move inspecting the works. His most severe condemnation of a staff member was "does not like to travel". Adolphe de Meulemeester retired on 22 June 1926. He was succeeded by Alfred Alphonse Moeller (1889–1971).

== Later years (1926–1944) ==
On 14–21 September 1926 De Meulemeester attended the International Conference on the Christian Mission in Africa, in Zoute, Belgium. There he attended a session on race relations with Alberto de Oliveira, the Portuguese minister of foreign affairs, Louis Franck, Frederick Lugard and the Brazilian intellectual Erasmo de Carvalho Braga. Oliveira claimed that Portugal had already worked out the "great problems of the relations between races" in Brazil, and Angola and Mozambique would develop into new Brazils.

On 7 July 1932 De Meulemeester married Marie-Jeanne Vansteensel Vanderaa. They divorced on 6 October 1936, and on 2 February 1938 he married Marie-Henriette Dor. De Meulemeester died in Brussels on 10 May 1944. A report of his death summarized his achievements as building a remarkable network of roads in Stanleyville Province and introducing cotton cultivation in several regions of the Congo.

== Sources ==
- "Congo (Kinshasa) Provinces", Rulers.org
- "Death of a prominent colonial", News from Belgium, Belgian National Tourist Office, 1944
- Jerónimo, Miguel Bandeira (22 January 2015), The 'Civilising Mission' of Portuguese Colonialism, 1870-1930, Palgrave Macmillan UK, ISBN 978-1-137-35591-1
- Moeller de Laddersous, A. (7 July 1961), Biographie Belge D'Outre-mer (PDF), vol. VI, Academie Royale des Sciences D'Outremer, pp. col.727–732
- Northrup, David (1988), Beyond the Bend in the River: African Labor in Eastern Zaire, 1865-1940, Ohio University Center for International Studies, ISBN 978-0-89680-151-6
- Pierfit, "Adolphe de MEULEMEESTER", Geneanet
