= Alfred Moeller de Laddersous =

Belgian lawyer, colonial administrator and businessman

Governor and deputy governor-general of Orientale Province
- In office 9 October 1926 – 8 April 1933
- Preceded by: Adolphe De Meulemeester
- Succeeded by: Rodolphe Dufour (Stanleyville Province); Georges Mortehan (Costermansville Province)

Personal details
- Born: Alfred Jean Alphonse Moeller; 9 December 1889 Leuven, Belgium
- Died: 20 January 1971 (aged 81) Brussels, Belgium
- Occupation: Lawyer, colonial administrator, businessman

Alfred Alphonse Moeller de Laddersous (9 December 1889 – 20 January 1971) was a Belgian lawyer, colonial administrator and businessman. He served as governor of the Orientale Province in the Belgian Congo from 1926 to 1933.

== Early years (1889–1913) ==
Alfred Jean Alphonse Moeller (Note: In 1939 Moeller was authorized to add "de Laddersous" to his surname.) was born in Leuven (Louvain), Belgium, on 9 December 1889. His great-grandfather was Norwegian. His grandfather Jean Moeller and his father Charles Moeller were both distinguished historians at the Catholic University of Louvain. His mother was Cécile Monville. Moeller attended the University of Leuven and graduated with a doctorate in law in 1911. He registered at the Mechelen Bar as a trainee, but soon decided to pursue a colonial career and was accepted by the territorial administration. He married Irène Garsou.

== Belgian Congo administrator (1913–1933) ==
Moeller arrived in the Congo on 12 April 1913, and was appointed adjoint supérieur of the Kasaï District. In 1914 he was appointed district commissioner in Sankuru. In 1917 he was district commissioner at Stanleyville under General Adolphe de Meulemeester, known as "King Adolphe". (Note: In his retirement Moeller wrote an affectionate but respectful portrait of his superior and predecessor, General Meulemeester, for the Biographie Belge D'Outre-mer series of the Academie Royale des Sciences D'Outremer.) He was promoted to district commissioner 1st class on 1 January 1920. On 16 February 1923 he was promoted to commissioner general of Orientale Province. In 1924 he was charged with a mission to study Uganda before returning via Mombasa to Europe.

Moeller succeeded Adolphe De Meulemeester as governor and deputy governor-general of Orientale Province, taking office on 9 October 1926. He was always passionately interest in African customs, and supported strengthening the indigenous political structures and customary courts. He considered that the decrees of 15 April 1926 on native jurisdictions, of 23 November 1931 on extra-customary centers and of 5 December 1933 on native constituencies would give legal force to these institutions, and did not see that in other provinces they would be used to destroy the traditional authorities and impose increasingly direct and centralized control. Without asking permission from his superiors, he created "waiting sectors" in which the new ideas could be tried out. He continued the policies of his predecessor in expanding the road network and developing cotton cultivation.

Moeller held office until 8 April 1933, when the provinces were reorganized and the era of the "great" provincial governors was over. He was replaced by Rodolphe Dufour as commissioner of Stanleyville Province (later renamed Orientale) and Georges Mortehan as commissioner of Costermansville Province (later Kivu).

== Later career (1933–1971) ==
A pensioner at the age of 49, Moeller had too much energy and too many ideas to remain inactive.

=== Colonial institutions ===
From 5 February 1930 Moeller was a corresponding member of the Belgian Colonial Institute, now the Royal Academy for Overseas Sciences. He became a full member in 1939 and chairman in 1950. After returning to Belgium in 1933 he became professor at the Colonial University of Belgium, later at the University Institute of Overseas Territories until 1950. He was a member of the Colonial Council from 1934 to 1938. In 1938 he became secretary general of the Kivu National Committee, holding his position until 1945. In 1939 he was rapporteur at the congress of the International Colonial Institute and later was vice-president of the successor International Institute of Differing Civilizations (INCIDI). From 1945 to 1949, he chaired the Colonial Economic and Social Fund. From 1945 to 1947 and in 1952–53 he was president of the Royal African Circle. In 1954 he was president of the Royal Colonial Union and from 1962 to 1965 of the Royal Belgian Union for the Congo and the Overseas Territories. In 1957 he was president of the board of directors of the Royal African Institute in London.

=== Commercial interests ===
In 1938 Moeller returned to the Congo to chair the first International Congress of African Tourism in Costermansville (Bukavu). In 1940 he was president of the Belgian Congo and Ruanda Urundi Tourist Office. He sat on the boards of directors of the Compagnie du Congo pour le Commerce et l'Industrie (CCCI), Compagnie Cotonnière Congolaise (Cotonco), Compagnie du chemin de fer du Congo supérieur aux Grands Lacs africains (CFL), Auxiliaire Industrielle et Financière des Grands Lacs Africains (Auxilacs) and the gold mines of Kilo-Moto, Société Immobilière au Kivu (SIMAK), among others. He was a vice-president of Sabena. Due to the links he forged during the war with Firmin van Bree, in 1945 he was put in charge of diamond sales of Forminière. He organized and represented this sector for 17 years in Great Britain, South Africa and the United States.

=== Other activities ===
During World War II (1939–1945) the Germans invaded Belgium in 1940. Moeller moved in turn to Bordeaux, Lisbon and then London. The Minister of the Colonies entrusted him with missions in the Congo where he stayed from 1941 to 1943. He returned to London and became an adviser to the government in exile on 1 July 1943. He was a member of the government's advisory board in 1943–44. In 1944–45, after the liberation of Belgian territory but before the end of the war, he was involved in efforts to assist colonists exhausted by the war effort. He made various visits to the Belgian Congo in 1948, 1950, 1952 and 1956, and in 1957 visited the newly independent Ghana.

In 1967 Moeller was forced to retire due to health problems. He died in Brussels on 20 January 1971.

== Publications ==
- Moeller, Alfred Alphonse Jean (1936), Les grandes lignes des migrations des Bantus de la province orientale du Congo belge, Bruxelles: G. van Campenhout
- Moeller, Alfred Alphonse Jean (1938), "Les finances publiques du Congo belge et du Ruanda-Urundi (Public finances of the Belgian Congo and Ruanda-Urundi)", Novelles, Droit colonial, vol. III

== Sources ==
- "Congo (Kinshasa) Provinces", Rulers.org
- G. M. (July 1971), "In Memoriam. Alfred Moeller de Laddersous", Africa: Journal of the International African Institute, 41 (3), Cambridge University Press on behalf of the International African Institute: 183–185, doi:10.1017/S0001972000084291, JSTOR 1158836
- Sohier, J. (8 January 1987), Biographie Belge D'Outre-mer, vol. VIII, Academie Royale des Sciences D'Outremer, pp. col.296–300 – via RAOS
