= List of governors of Léopoldville / Bandundu =

Belgian Congo provinces in 1933 after Léopoldville and Lusambo (Kasaï) had been separated

Bandundu Province after the western provinces of Kinshasa and Bas-Congo were split out

This List of governors of Léopoldville / Bandundu includes governors of the Léopoldville Province of the Belgian Congo and its successor Republic of the Congo (Léopoldville), which was divided in 1963–1966 into the provinces of Kwilu, Kwango, and Mai-Ndombe, and governors of the Bandundu Province in the period from when it was formed in 1966 by merging these three provinces and when it was broken up into the former regions in 2015.

== Léopoldville Province (1932–1963) ==
The governors or equivalent of Léopoldville Province were:

Start	End	Officeholder	Title
1933	1941	Albert-Émile de Beauffort	Commissioner
1941	1943	Albert-Émile de Beauffort	Governor
1943	1945	Marcel Maquet (1891–1964)	Governor
1946	1950	Léon Morel	Governor
1950	1953	Lucien Lardinois (1898–1956)	Governor
1953	1955	Pierre Nauwelaert (1903–1969)	Governor
1955	1959	Julien Babilon (1904–1959)	Governor
1959	10 May 1960	Jean-Baptiste Bomans	Governor
10 May 1960	29 June 1960	Alain Stenmans (b. 1923)	Governor
11 June 1960	29 June 1960	Gaston Diomi Ndongala (b. 1922)	President of secessionist Congo province
18 June 1960	12 February 1962	Cléophas Kamitatu (1931–2008)	President
20 June 1960	1960	Gaston Midu	President of secessionist Nord-Kwilu province
12 February 1962	14 August 1962	Gaston Diomi Ndongala	President

== Successors (1963–1966) ==
- Kwilu
- Kwango
- Mai-Ndombe

== Bandundu Province (1966–2015) ==
The governors or equivalent of Bandundu Province were:

Start	End	Officeholder	Title
25 April 1966	3 January 1967	Henri-Désiré Takizala (1936–2000)	Governor
3 Jan 1967	30 August 1967	François Luakabwanga	Governor
30 August 1967	9 August 1968	François Kupa	Governor
9 August 1968	6 March 1969	Paul Muhona	Governor
12 March 1969	23 December 1970	Dieudonné Boji	Governor
23 December 1970	15 July 1972	Anaclet Kaniki	Commissioner
15 July 1972	10 January 1975	Mulenda Shamwange	Commissioner
10 Jan 1975	21 January 1978	Kabangu Lunyanya	Commissioner
21 Jan 1978	18 January 1980	Makolo Jibikilayi	Commissioner
18 Jan 1980	27 August 1980	Alemo Logwala	Commissioner
27 August 1980	10 October 1981	Malumba Mbangula	Governor
10 October 1981	1 January 1985	Konde Vila Kikanda	Governor
1 Jan 1985	1986	Sambia Gere Danu	Governor
1986		Mananga Dintoko Pholo	Governor
20 July 1988	1990	Samba Kaputo (1946–2007)	Governor
*1992	1994*	Payanzo Ntsomo	Governor
1997	26 November 2001	Marc Katshunga	Governor
26 November 2001	2003	Kidinda Shandungo	Governor
October 2003		Oscar Bala	Governor
26 May 2004	10 December 2005	Sabin Sadiboko	Governor
10 December 2005	13 January 2006	Guy Kunza	Governor
13 Jan 2006	16 October 2006	Gérard Gifuza	Governor
16 October 2006	16 March 2007	Édouard Wenzi wa Kuyula	Governor
16 March 2007	22 May 2012	Richard Ndambu Wolang (b. 1952)	Governor
22 May 2012	29 October 2015	Jean Kamisendu Kutuka (b. 1955)	Governor

== See also ==
- Lists of provincial governors of the Democratic Republic of the Congo
