= Pierre Leroy =

Belgian lawyer and colonial administrator (1909–1985)

Governor of Orientale Province
- In office 22 December 1958 – 11 June 1960
- Preceded by: André Schöller
- Succeeded by: Jean-Pierre Finant

Personal details
- Born: 1909
- Died: 1985 (aged 75–76)
- Occupation: Lawyer, colonial administrator

Pierre Leroy (1909 – 1985) was a Belgian lawyer and colonial administrator.

== Life ==
Pierre Leroy was born in 1909. He obtained a doctorate in law, and joined the territorial service of the Belgian Congo in 1938.

Leroy became interested in the Neolithic megaliths in the Uele River basin, and later wrote a book on the subject. Some thought they were natural formations, but Leroy thought they must be man-made and deserved the attention of the prehistorian or protohistorian. Leroy was interested in the paving at Api, which had been badly damaged during excavations in 1936 and 1940 by Jeanne Tercafs, who moved central stones and dug trenches, then left the wrecked site to the mercy of the weather. Leroy saw similarities to structures of Ancient Egypt, and hypothesized that there could be a connection. He thought the pavement could have been the base for a massive religious structure, probably a tomb.

Leroy was governor of the Orientale Province from 22 December 1958 to 11 June 1960, when the Congo Republic became independent. On 12 January 1960, Patrice Lumumba was sentenced to six months imprisonment. Pierre Leroy, with the agreement of the governor-general and the governor of Katanga, had him transferred the next day to Buluo prison in Jadotville, Katanga. On 25 January, the Belgian government ordered Lumumba's release so he could participate in a round table discussion in Brussels of the independence process.

In 1961, with an unstable situation, the Belgian teachers who had remained in the Congo went on strike to demand open return tickets so they could return to Belgium at any time if conditions got worse. Leroy was sent to Luluabourg to evaluate the situation of Belgians there, including 90 teachers and 50 former colonial administrators who were providing advice to their successors. Leroy was critical of the administrators but positive about the teachers, whom he saw as important in the context of the Cold War in counteracting the influence of Eastern Europeans there. He wrote, "Our teachers exert a tremendous influence on the country’s evolution by educating the next generation of leaders." The Belgian government should remember that the teachers were "the greatest means of pressure in our possession."

Leroy died in 1985.

== Publications ==
Leroy wrote a five-volume autobiography of his life in the Congo, with 100 copies printed by himself and given to his parents and friends. Other works include:

- Pierre Leroy, Journal de la Province orientale : décembre 1958-mai 1960
- Pierre Leroy, Le temps d'Usumbura
- Pierre Leroy; Jacques Westhof, Législation du Ruanda-Urundi (matières sociales et ećonomiques)
- Pierre Leroy; Jacques Westhof, Législation du Ruanda-Urundi
- Pierre Leroy, Matériaux pour servir à l'étude de la préhistoire de l'Uele. Le dallage d'Api. - Le mégalithe d'Obeledi
- Pierre Leroy, La situation juridique des églises catholiques depuis la loi du 9 décembre 1904

== Sources ==
- "Congo (Kinshasa) Provinces", Rulers.org
- Lamy, E. (1982), "Autobiographie africaine de Pierre Leroy, dernier gouverneur de la province Orientale du Congo belge", Bulletin des séances = Mededelingen der zittingen, 28 (3): 269–285
- Monaville, Pedro A. G. (2013), Decolonizing the University: Postal Politics, The Student Movement, and Global 1968 in the Congo (PDF) (thesis), University of Michigan
- Omasombo Tshonda, Jean (2014), Bas Uele Pouvoirs locaux et économie agricole : héritages d'un passé brouillé (PDF) (in French), Musée royal de l’Afrique centrale, ISBN 978-9-4916-1586-3
- Yabili, Marcel (17 January 2011), "Patrice Lumumba", Stanleyville.be (in French)
