= Rodolphe Dufour =

Belgian colonial administrator

Governor of Katanga Province (interim)
- In office 1931–1931
- Preceded by: Gaston Heenen
- Succeeded by: Louis Joseph Postiaux

Commissioner of Stanleyville Province
- In office 1 October 1933 – 18 November 1940
- Preceded by: Alfred Alphonse Moeller
- Succeeded by: Marcel Maquet

Personal details
- Died: South Africa (before 1945)
- Occupation: Colonial administrator

Rodolphe Dufour was a Belgian colonial administrator. From 1933 to 1940 he was commissioner (governor) of the Orientale Province.

== Life ==
Dufour was commissaire general at Elisabethville, acting for the governor who was absent in 1929 and 1930. In 1931 he was interim governor of Katanga Province. Dufour succeeded Alfred Alphonse Moeller (1889–1971) as commissioner of Stanleyville Province, the new name for Orientale Province. He held office from 1 October 1933 to 18 November 1940.

In December 1934 Dufour wrote to the General Governor at Leopoldville about occupation of the Beni Territory (in what is now North Kivu), with attached letters and reports that led to a decision in favor of a military occupation. In 1938 Dufour was responsible for a serious automobile accident and was forced to pay a large fine by the Léopoldville court of appeal.

In the late 1930s Dufour was the target of concerted and virulent attacks from La Belgika (Note: La Belgika, founded in 1894 with headquarters in Stanleyville, exported coffee, rubber, palm oil and other products from the eastern provinces and Kivu.) and the Kilo-Moto Gold Mines delivered by their influential representatives André Gilson, also president of the Association of Belgian Colonial Interests, and by General Georges Moulaert. They claimed that he failed to support colonial interests and caused great damage as a result. In 1939 the governor wrote to Dufour asking about the origin of a statement often attributed to him, that he would rather see his territorial agents in their bed than in a cotton field. The governor wanted to put an end to these attacks on Dufour. Although the governor's letter was friendly and personal, Dufour's reply was formal.

In November 1938 General E. Hennequin, commander of the Force Publique, and Robert Reisdorff, (Note: Robert-Martin Reisdorff (1885–1949), Inspector of State, director general at the Ministry of Colonies.) the newly appointed replacement of M. Georges Mortehan as inspector of state, dined with Rodolphe Dufour. The general was placed to the left of the hostess and the inspector of state to the right. The general complained bitterly to the Minister of Colonies about what he saw as a public humiliation. Dufour's health deteriorated badly and he was replaced at the end of 1940 by Marcel Maquet (1891–1964). He died in South Africa before the end of World War II (1939–1945).

== Sources ==
- Archives d'Auguste Verbeken – HA.01.0192 (PDF), Tervuren: Musée royal de l’Afrique centrale
- "Congo (Kinshasa) Provinces", Rulers.org
- Duren, A. (28 August 1959), "REISDORFF (Robert-Martin)", Biographie Belge dÓutre-Mer (PDF), vol. VI, Académie Royale des Sciences d'Outre-Mer
- Ernst, Jean-Luc, "La Belgika", Stanleyville.be
- Ernst (b), Jean-Luc, "Les gouverneurs de la Province Orientale", Stanleyville.be
- Stenstrom, Gosta (2009), Les Archives de Bruxelles (PDF), Swedish Institute of Mission Research
- Van Bockhaven, Vicky L. M. (December 2013), The Leopard Men of the Eastern Congo (ca. 1890-1940): history and colonial representation (PDF) (Thesis), University of East Anglia
- Vanderlinden, Jacques (1988), Le gouverneur et les militaires (1935-1940) (PDF), Académie Royale des Sciences d'Outre-Mer
- Vanderlinden, Jacques (15 April 1994), Pierre Ryckmans 1891-1959: Coloniser dans l'honneur, De Boeck Supérieur, ISBN 978-2-8041-1881-5
