= Albert de Beauffort =

Belgian colonial administrator

Albert-Émile de Beauffort

Governor of Léopoldville Province
- In office 1933–1941
- Succeeded by: Marcel Maquet

Governor of Lusambo Province
- In office July 1944 – 1945
- Preceded by: François Wenner
- Succeeded by: René P. Preys

Personal details
- Born: 20 March 1899 Brussels, Belgium
- Died: 15 March 1983 (aged 83) Namur, Belgium
- Occupation: Colonial administrator

Count Albert-Émile de Beauffort (20 March 1899 – 15 March 1983) was a Belgian colonial administrator.

== Early years ==
Albert Émile Joseph Benoît François d'Assise Anne Marie Ghislain de Beauffort was born in St-Gilles, Brussels on 20 March 1899. His parents were Georges de Beauffort, Comte de Beauffort (1871–1928) and Antoinette de Liedekerke de Pailhe (1869–1959). He obtained a degree in Commerce. After World War I (1914–1918) he was made a commissioner of war damages.

== Belgian Congo ==
On 8 March 1925 Beauffort married Adrienne de Zualart (1894–1995) in Boma. In 1933 de Beauffort was appointed Commissioner of Léopoldville Province in the Belgian Congo when that province was created from part of the former Congo-Kasaï Province. In 1941 his title was changed to Governor of Léopoldville Province. He was also made State Inspector of the colony. In March 1942 the Minister for the Colonies, Albert De Vleeschauwer, and the Prime Minister, Hubert Pierlot, arrived in the Congo. They disagreed strongly with Governor General Pierre Ryckmans about reorganization of authority at the governor level. The result was a sort of power-sharing arrangement between Vice-Governor Paul Ermens and State Inspector Albert de Beauffort.

Beauffort and his wife were among the donators to the Musée de la vie indigène in Leopoldville from its inception. Their gifts in the 1940s included an ivory Pende pendant and twelve Pende masks. Beauffort left his office of governor of Léopoldville Province in 1943, succeeded by Marcel Maquet. From July 1944 to 1945 he was governor of Lusambo Province. He was president of the bureau for administering the Queen Elisabeth Fund for Medical Assistance to the Indigenous People of the Belgian Congo (Fonds Reine Elisabeth pour l’ Assistance Médicale aux Indigènes du Congo belge). In 1960 he was a member of the administrative council of the Société Générale de Belgique.

== Later career ==
On 30 December 1958 Count Albert-E.-H.G. de Beauffort, former state inspector in the Belgian Congo, president and administrator of colonial societies, was promoted to commander of the Order of Leopold. In 1961 he was a member of the Congo and Ruanda-Urundi National Parks Commission. He died in Namur on 15 March 1983.

== Sources ==
- 4e Zitting Van De 50e Zittingsperiode 2001/2002 (PDF), De Kamer
- Base collaborative Pierfit, "Albert de BEAUFFORT", Geneanet
- Belgium (1959), Belgisch staatsblad
- "Congo (Kinshasa) Provinces", Rulers.org
- Feltz, Gaétan (1998), "La colonisation belge sous l'oeil inquisiteur des événements du Rwanda, du Burundi et du Congo/Zaïre", Outre-Mers. Revue d'histoire (in French), no. 321, pp. 43–63
- Raymaekers, Jan (21 March 2017), The Musée de la vie indigène in Leopoldville (PDF), Royal Academy for Overseas Sciences
- Trente Et Unieme Rapport Annuel (PDF) (in French), Institut Des Parcs Nationaux Du Congo Et Du Ruanda-urundi, 1961
