= Pierre Nauwelaert =

Belgian colonial administrator

Governor of Équateur (interim)
- In office 1950–1951
- Preceded by: Luc Breuls de Tiecken
- Succeeded by: Luc Breuls de Tiecken

Governor of Léopoldville Province
- In office 1 July 1953 – 28 February 1955
- Preceded by: Lucien Lardinois
- Succeeded by: Julien Babilon

Personal details
- Born: 17 March 1903 Antwerp, Belgium
- Died: 8 February 1969 (aged 65) Brussels, Belgium
- Occupation: Colonial administrator

Pierre Nauwelaert (17 March 1903 – 8 February 1969) was a Belgian colonial administrator. He was interim governor of Équateur Province from 1950 to 1951, and was governor of Léopoldville Province from 1953 to 1955.

== Life ==
Pierre Nauwelaert was born in Antwerp on 17 March 1903, son of Arcadius Nauwelaert and Marie Blom. He graduated from the Colonial University in 1925.

Nauwelaert was appointed a territorial administrator 2nd class in Lusambo District. After a four month internship at the district capital, he was assigned to the Loto territory, which at the time was little known, had little infrastructure and few means of communication. In 1929 he was appointed government delegate to various organizations involved in renovating the Matadi–Léopoldville Railway, a project that lasted from 1923 to 1932 and involved correcting the route and upgrading to standard gauge. This was a difficult task with many problems in providing housing, food and medical care for the laborers, and constant coordination between the different services and groups involved.

Nauwelaert was territorial administrator in Mayumbe from 1933 to 1938. In 1939 he was assistant district commissioner in Bas-Congo District, then spent six months in Léopoldville in charge of the indigenous affairs service of Léopoldville Province. He was promoted to district commissioner in 1940, but remained in Léopoldville in charge of the provincial secretariat until 1943, then in charge of the general government's personnel department. He was given charge of the Bas-Congo at the start of 1945. He had to deal with disturbances in Matadi that year, including strikes, destruction of property and imprisonment of Europeans by the rebels.

From 1948 Nauwelaert served as provincial commissioner in Coquilhatville, Équateur Province and in Léopoldville Province, and was interim governor in both provinces. He was formally given the title of provincial commissioner on 1 July 1948. He stood in for Luc Breuls de Tiecken in Équateur in 1950, and signed his decrees as Governor of Équateur until Breuls de Tiecken resumed office in 1951.

On 1 July 1953 Nauwelaert was made governor of Léopoldville Province, holding office until he retired from the colonial service on 28 February 1955. He succeeded Lucien Lardinois in this office, and was succeeded by Julien Babilon (1904–1959). From 1955 to 1960 he remained in Léopoldville as general representative of the Congolese cotton company (Société cotonnière congolaise), of which he became administrator on 11 July 1960. He died in Brussels on 8 February 1969.

== Sources ==
- "Congo (Kinshasa) Provinces", Rulers.org
- Gille, Albert (22 November 1972), "NAUWELAERT (Pierre)", Biographie Belge d'Outre-Mer (in French), vol. VII–B, Académie Royale des Sciences d'Outre-Mer, pp. col. 267–268
- Hulstaert, G. (1990), "Aux origines de Mbandaka", Mbandaka Hier et aujourd'hui (PDF) (in French), Centre Æquatoria
