= Médard Autsai Asenga =

Congolese politician (1942–2024)

Governor of Orientale Province
- In office 24 February 2007 – 5 March 2012
- Preceded by: Jean-Pierre Lola Kisanga
- Succeeded by: Ismaël Arama Ndiama

Member of the National Assembly
- Incumbent
- Assumed office 6 March 2012

Personal details
- Born: 2 January 1942
- Died: 22 November 2024 (aged 82)
- Occupation: Politician

Médard Autsai Asenga (2 January 1942 – 22 November 2024) was a Congolese politician who was governor of the former Orientale Province, and later a National Representative.

== Origins ==
Médard Autsai Asenga was born in 1942. He was born into a modest family in Aru, Ituri Province, his mother's only son. He was a practicing Christian.

== Governor of Orientale ==
Autsai was governor of Orientale Province from 24 February 2007 to 5 March 2012. On 30 April 2010, Asenga was made Grand Commander of the National Order of the Leopard, the highest civilian decoration in the country.

In October 2010 Autsai was present at a ceremony where a large delivery of election equipment arrived by boat in Kisangani. It had been shipped from Kinshasa by the United Nations Organisation Stabilisation Mission in the DR Congo (MONUSCO). Autsai Asenga thanked MONUSCO and expressed hope that it would be put to good use.

== National deputy ==
Autsai was elected to the National Assembly for the Aru Territory, running on the PPRD platform. He took office on 6 March 2012, and resigned from his position as governor of Orientale. In May 2012 a group of provincial deputies representing the four districts of Orientale Province demanded that the Independent National Electoral Commission (Ceni) organize an election to replace the interim governor Ismaël Arama Ndiama who had replaced him, since an interim governor could not effectively deal with major issues faced by the province.

His son, Patrice Adriko Autsai, was later elected national deputy for Aru.
