= Ernest-Camille Bock =

Belgian lawyer and colonial administrator

Governor of Orientale Province
- In office 1 June 1945 – 29 June 1950
- Preceded by: Bertrand
- Succeeded by: Joseph-Paul Brasseur

Governor of Orientale Province
- In office 8 October 1951 – 10 December 1952
- Preceded by: Joseph-Paul Brasseur
- Succeeded by: Luc Breuls de Tiecken

Personal details
- Born: 11 November 1894 Schaerbeek, Belgium
- Died: 10 December 1952 (aged 58) Stanleyville, Belgian Congo
- Occupation: Colonial administrator

Ernest-Camille Bock (11 November 1894 – 10 December 1952) was a Belgian lawyer and colonial administrator. He was governor of Orientale Province in the Belgian Congo from 1945 to 1952.

== Early years (1894–1927) ==
Ernest-Camille Bock was born on 11 November 1894 in Schaerbeek, Belgium. He studied the humanities at the Royal Athenaeum in Malines. During World War I (1914–1918) he escaped when Belgium was invaded by the Germans and enlisted as a volunteer. For his conduct in action he received several citations and was awarded the Croix de Guerre with palm. He was demobilized in August 1919 and enrolled at the University of Liège. In 1924 he obtained a doctorate in law. He was registered with the Bar Association near the Brussels Court of Appeal for two and a half years.

Bock married Suzanne Anciaux.

== Colonial administrator ==
Bock enrolled in the legal section of the Colonial School of the Ministry of Colonies. After his studies he passed the examinations and was appointed Legal Advisor to the Government of the Belgian Congo. He served in this role in Stanleyville, capital of the Orientale Province, from April 1927 until March 1933, while also in charge of the Administrative Service of Justice. In August 1933 he headed the Legal Service at the General Government in Léopoldville. During World War II (1939–1945), he dealt with many problems of internal and international law.

Governor General Pierre Ryckmans found Bock a useful co-worker. Due to his services and administrative experience, Bock was appointed governor of Oriental Province, based in Stanleyville in June 1945. He held office until 29 June 1950, when he was temporarily replaced by Joseph-Paul Brasseur, then again from 8 October 1951. He performed his duties with enthusiasm, authority and tact. He traveled widely in his province so he could see the social and economic changes and encourage his people. After a long day's work, on 10 December 1952 he died in Stanleyville of a sudden embolism. He was succeeded as governor by Luc Breuls de Tiecken.

Clippings, diaries, correspondence, notes, etc. by Bock were collected by Maurice Martin de Ryck, governor of Équateur Province, and are held by Michigan State University Libraries Special Collections.

== Decorations ==
Decorations included:

- Croix de guerre (1914–18) with palms
- Knight of the Order of Leopold II with swords
- Serbian Silver Medal for Bravery
- Commander of the Order of Leopold
- Officer of the Royal Order of the Lion

== Sources ==
- Berlemont, F.; Van den Abeele, M. (29 January 1972), "BOCK (Ernest-Camille)", Biographie Belge D'Outre-mer (PDF), vol. VII, Academie Royale des Sciences D'Outre-mer
- "Congo (Kinshasa) Provinces", Rulers.org
- Ernest Bock, gouverneur de la Province Orientale, Michigan State University
