= Maduda =

Coordinates: 04°55′00″S 13°06′00″E

Maduda is a village in Bas-Congo province, Democratic Republic of the Congo. The town lies at an altitude of 1059 ft (322 m) above sea level, and is northeast of the larger town of Tshela, to which it is connected by road. There are waterfalls to the north and southeast of the village.
