= Erasmo de Carvalho Braga =

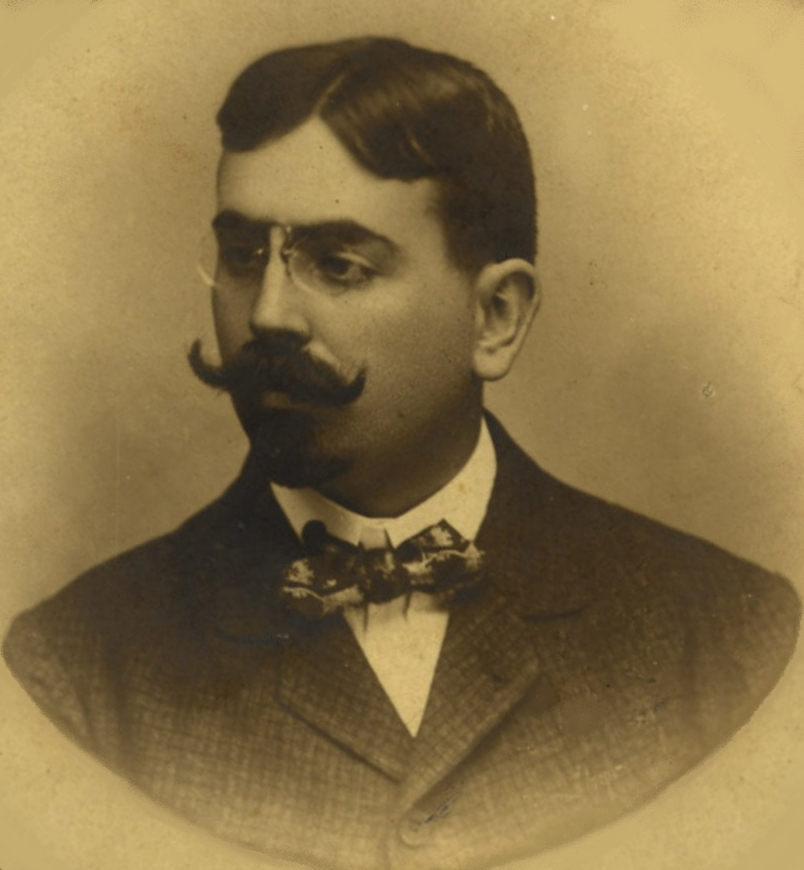
- Braga in 1901
- Born: 23 April 1877; Rio Claro, São Paulo, Brazil
- Died: 11 May 1932 (aged 55); Niterói, Rio de Janeiro, Brazil
- Occupation: Evangelical leader

Erasmo de Carvalho Braga (23 April 1877 – 11 May 1932) was a Brazilian Protestant evangelical leader.

== Life ==
Erasmo de Carvalho Braga was born in Rio Claro, São Paulo, Brazil on 23 April 1877. His father was from Portugal, and was one of the first ministers of the Presbyterian Church of Brazil. He attended Mackenzie College, a missionary school in São Paulo. He graduated from the Presbyterian Seminary in São Paulo, was ordained in 1898 and became a pastor near Rio de Janeiro. In 1901 he returned to São Paulo to teach at the Mackenzie College and the Presbyterian Seminary.

In 1916 Braga attended the Congress on Christian Work in Panama City, where he embraced evangelical concepts. He became general secretary of the Brazilian Committee on Cooperation in 1920. This was a branch of the Committee on Cooperation in Latin America, established after the Panama congress and led by Robert Elliott Speer and Samuel Guy Inman.

Braga became the best known Brazilian evangelical. He believed that the evangelical churches in Latin America should inspire the people, as they had in Europe, to embrace ideals of ethics, democracy, education and social and economic progress. The churches should attempt to transform society and implant God's kingdom on earth. He tried to bring together Presbyterians, Methodists, Congregationalists and Episcopalians, but with mixed success. Erasmo de Carvalho Braga died on 11 May 1932 in Niterói, Rio de Janeiro.

== Selected publications ==
- Braga, Erasmo (1916), Pan-americanismo: aspecto religioso : Una relación e interpretación del Congreso de Acción Cristiana en la América Latina celebrada en Panamá los 10 a 19 de febrero de 1916., New York: Sociedade para la Educación Misionera en los Estados Unidos y el Canadá
- Braga, Erasmo (1916), Pan-Americanism: The Religious Aspect, New York: Sociedade de preparo missionario funccionando nos Estados Unidos e Canada
- Braga, Erasmo (1929), "Following Up the Jerusalem Meeting in Brazil", International Review of Mission, 18 (2): 261–265, doi:10.1111/j.1758-6631.1929.tb03945.x
- Braga, Erasmo; Grubb, Kenneth G. (1932), The Republic of Brazil: A Survey of the Religious Situation, London: World Dominion Press

== Sources ==
- Ferreira, Júlio Andrade (1975), Profeta da Unidade - Erasmo Braga: uma vida a descoberto (in Portuguese), Rio de Janeiro: Editora Vozes
- Matos, Alderi Souza de, Braga, Erasmo (1877-1932), Boston University School of Theology
