= Simon Kimbangu =

Congolese religious leader (1887–1951)

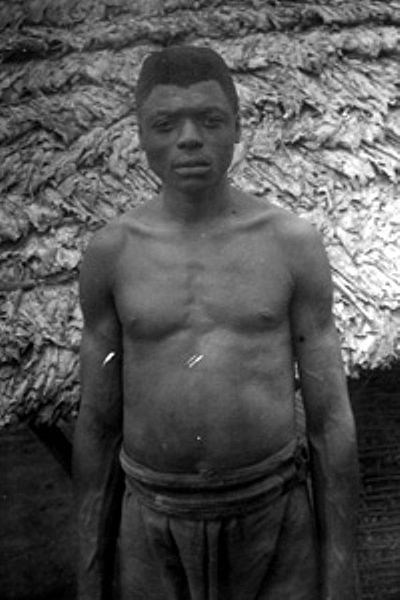
- Simon Kimbangu

Personal life
- Born: Simon Kimbangu; September 12, 1887 Nkamba, Congo Free State
- Died: October 12, 1951 (aged 64) Elisabethville, Belgian Congo
- Spouse: Marie Muilu Kiawanga Nzitani
- Children: Charles Kisolokele Lukelo, Salomon Dialungana Kiangani, Joseph Diangienda Kuntima.
- Known for: Founding Kimbanguism

Religious life
- Religion: Kimbanguism, (Christianity)

Simon Kimbangu (September 12, 1887 – October 12, 1951) was a Congolese religious leader who founded the Christian new religious movement Kimbanguism. Kimbanguists consider him to be an incarnation of the Holy Spirit.

== Biography ==
Kimbangu was born at Nkamba, near Thysville, in 1887. Kimbangu's arrival is claimed to have been prophesied before his birth by Kimpa Vita in the 1600s. Her message was about the arrival of the Holy Spirit as well as the liberation of Africa, for which she was persecuted by the Catholic Church and burnt alive.

According to the Kimbanguist narrative, on September 12, 1887, there was a terrible rain storm and thunder; Papa Kuyela, a traditional religious leader, and Mama Luezi found an infant in the bush and adopted him - that child found was whom Kimpa Vuta prophesied about. He became a Baptist in 1915, and worked as a catechist for several years before beginning his own ministry after being called by The Lord Jesus Christ in 1910.

In early 1921, he was told to wake up the work of God, and that he was to preach his message and to proclaim his divinity to an unfaithful people and those who had forgotten the message of the lord. According to his disciples, Kimbangu cured the sick, raised the dead back to life, prophesied the future and the liberation of black people, and revealed many hidden things from the bible. His ministry developed a large following, causing suspicion amongst the Belgian authorities. His ministry of preaching and miraculous healing lasted from April to September 1921. Within a short time he attracted large crowds.

According to Dr. Bertram Melbourne, both the Protestant and the Catholic religious establishments became alarmed and appealed to the colonial authorities who sought his arrest. David van Reybrouck, however, indicated that the Belgian administrator, Léon Morel, became concerned and invited Catholic and Protestant missionaries to a meeting in Thysville. While the Catholics supported a vigorous intervention, the Protestants favored a soft approach as they saw it as a form of Christian devotion. The hardliners prevailed, and Kimbangu and his followers were arrested on 6 June 1921, but Kimbangu escaped with some of his disciples and his son, Charles, into the bush.

His ministry continued in hiding, but in September he turned himself in. While in Mbanza-Nsanda, Kimbangu made numerous prophecies concerning the liberation of Africa and its independence. He further alluded to a time when soon all nations will come to the temple Nkamba to worship him, and there will be one church, one language (Kikongo), and one God. He was placed before a military court, without the benefit of a legal representative, and found guilty of undermining public security and disturbing the peace.

During his trial, there were many false accusations brought against him by the Belgian religious leaders, and the Italian judge de Rossi asked him to make explicit his religious claims. In his reply, Kimbangu stated that he's not a prophet but the special envoy of Jesus, the Muanda Velela, meaning Holy Spirit in Kikongo; the one promised by Christ in John 14:15, the coming of the Holy Spirit. On 3 October 1921, because of his claim, he was sentenced to death.

He was moved to the prison in Elisabethville where he died on 12 October 1951. His body was exhumed and reburied in Nkamba with full military honours in 1960. Recently the Congolese government has introduced a law establishing 6 April of each year as a holiday dedicated to the “fight of Simon Kimbangu and the African consciousness”. Now, 6 April is the date that marked the beginning of the healing and prophetic activities of Simon Kimbangu.

== The Kimbanguist Church ==
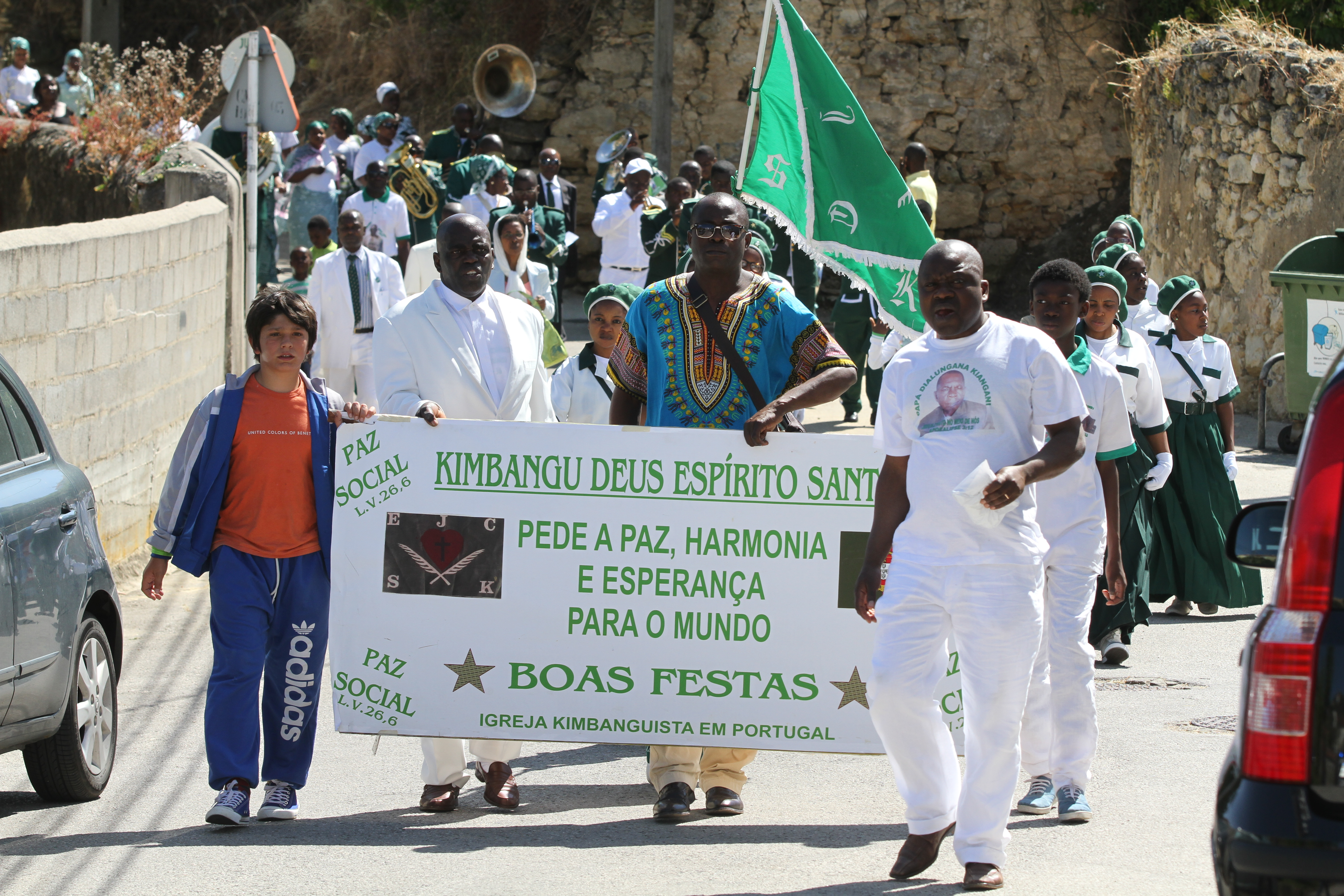
Members of the Kimbangu Church of Portugal celebrating New Year on May 25, 2013, outside Lisbon, Portugal.

After Simon Kimbangu's trial, the administration tried to suppress the movement. Followers were banished to different parts of the country and their faith was outlawed. In 1940, the highest ranking exiles were placed in guarded work camps and subjected to forced labor; many died. As a result of the persecution, the Church spread in the underground and reached people in other areas. In 1959, the Kimbanguist Church was recognized by the Belgian government and could then conduct prayer freely.

Today, the Kimbanguist Church is well established in several countries amongst the Congolese diaspora. When Kimbangu died, his son Joseph Diangienda, who Kimbanguists and others claim is the second incarnation of Simon Kimbangu (as he prophesied in 1910) took over the Church ministry. Joseph Diangienda (chief spiritual) organized the contemporary Church. Diangienda (born 22 March 1918) died on 8 July 1992 in Switzerland and was succeeded by his elder brother Salomon Dialungana Kiangani, who Kimbanguists also claim is The Lord Jesus Christ reincarnated back to mankind.

Salomon's son, Simon Kimbangu Kiangani, the grandson of Simon Kimbangu and who the Kimbanguist Church today claims is Simon Kimbangu resurrected, is now the spiritual leader based at the Church's headquarters in Nkamba.

== Miracles and Healing Ministry ==
After being rejected by a Baptist missionary which prevented Kimbangu from becoming a catechist within the Baptist church, Kimbangu reportedly had a vision in 1918 from Jesus Christ which told him of his mission to prepare God's people for the return of Christ and the Kingdom of God. After initially rejecting the call and pursuing economic activities in Leopoldville, Kimbangu returned to Nkamba in 1921 to act upon his calling. Kimbangu's ministry began in 1921 and was characterized by accounts of miraculous healing.

According to Kimbangu's successor, Joseph Diangienda, accounts of Kimbangu's miracles proliferated his following in the Congo, prompting outside missionaries to respond in an attempt to slow it. In 1921, Rev. Lanyon Jennings attempted to denounce Kimbangu by performing miracles in the name of Jesus before a large crowd. Jennings prayed and attempted, to no avail, to heal the paralyzed people brought to him as the crowd jeered. When Kimbangu approached the man and commanded he walk again, the paralyzed man reportedly rose and walked among a cheering crowd. Accounts such as this strengthened Kimbangu's following during the height of his ministry in the early 1920s.

== See also ==
- Simon-Pierre Mpadi
- Mandombe script
- Orchestre Symphonique Kimbanguiste

== Additional references ==
- MacGaffey, Wyatt. "Kimbangu, Simon." In Encyclopedia of African Religions and Philosophy, pp. 379-381. Dordrecht: Springer Netherlands, 2022.
