= Jean-Pierre Lola Kisanga =

Congolese politician (1969–2020)

- Born: 6 June 1969; Watsa, Republic of the Congo
- Died: 1 December 2020 (aged 51); Kinshasa, Democratic Republic of the Congo
- Occupation: Politician

Jean-Pierre Lola Kisanga (10 June 1969 – 1 December 2020) was a Congolese politician.

== Biography ==
Kisanga served as Congolese Minister of Higher Education until 15 November 2005, when he was appointed by President Joseph Kabila to succeed Théo Baruti as Governor of the Oriental Province. He retained this position until 24 February 2007, when he was succeeded by Médard Autsai Asenga. He also served as a spokesperson for the Rally for Congolese Democracy–Goma.

Kisanga died from COVID-19 in December 2020.
