= Gérard Gifuza =

Gérard Gifuza Ginday served as governor of Bandundu Province, Democratic Republic of the Congo, from January 13, 2006 to January 2007. He was nominated to the post by President Joseph Kabila on December 10, 2005.

== Bandundu reporter "offends" Gifuza ==
On July 13, 2006, controversy ensued when a journalist for Kinshasa-based Congo FM, Olivier Komfie Mabwava, was summoned by a Bandundu judge, then promptly arrested with a warrant issued by state prosecutor Kapuba Tshokoyokoyo, for having "deeply offended" Governor Gifuza with remarks made by the president of the provincial union of doctors in a July 6 interview, accusing the provincial governor of "blocking the salaries of health personnel" and inviting "his colleagues to stage a sit-in outside the governor's office." The arrest was protested by Journalist in Danger (Reporters Without Borders' Congolese affiliate), and Mabwava was released 48 hours later "after paying a compromise fine of 10,000 Congolese francs (23 USD), which resulted in the withdrawal of charges against him".
