= International Institute of Differing Civilizations =

INCIDI
- International Institute of Differing Civilizations
- Institut international des civilisations différentes
- Location: Brussels, Belgium
- Region served: International

The International Institute of Differing Civilizations (French: Institut international des civilisations différentes, INCIDI) was an organization based in Brussels, Belgium, founded in 1894 as the International Colonial Institute (French: Institut colonial international, ICI), that was active until 1980. It was a forum for discussion of issues related to administration and development of European colonies, and later of post-colonial independent states.

== International Colonial Institute ==
The International Colonial Institute was founded on 8 January 1894 in Brussels, Belgium. The institute was incorporated under Belgian law, and had its headquarters in Brussels. Members were elected internationally from among the "distinguished citizens of States possessing colonies or undertaking colonization in their own territory". There could be no more than 200 fellows of the institute in the world at any time. The main statutory objectives of the Institution were:

- To facilitate and spread the comparative study of the political science of administration and of colonial legislation.
- To promote international relations between statesmen, administrators, and men of science thus engaged.
- To organize scientifically an international Bureau of information.

It was taken for granted that the European colonizers had a mission to spread European civilization in their colonies and to guide their backward subjects in a peaceful transition from primitive agricultural societies and animist religions to more advanced industrial and Christian practices. The institution soon became very influential. There were 194 members in 1936. Presidents included Joseph Chailley (1921–1923), Ramón María de Dalmau y de Olivart (1923–1925), François Marcal (1929–1936) and Lord Lugard (1936). The institution held annual sessions in different capitals where various issues were discussed, and plenary sessions every two years or so. It published a yearbook that gave legislative, administrative and political information about the most important colonies, and monographs on particular subjects. Congresses were held in Brussels (1920), Paris (1921), Brussels (1923), Rome (1924), The Hague (1927), Brussels (1929), Paris (1931), Lisbon (1933), London (1936), Rome (1939).

== International Institute of Differing Civilizations ==
After World War II (1939–1945) the term "Colonial" had negative connotations. In 1946 the institute was renamed to the Institute of political and social sciences applied to countries with different civilizations (Institut international des sciences politiques et sociales appliquées aux pays de civilisations différentes). It was legally registered in Belgium under this name on 22 April 1949.

As of 1951 the institution, already informally called the Institut international des civilisations différentes, was exclusively scientific in nature and had no official nature. Its purpose was to promote development of moral and political sciences in places where people of different civilizations were in contact. The institute would study administrative, political, social, cultural and economic problems due to the contact of these peoples, facilitate exchange of ideas on dealing with these problems and inform world opinion on these issues. The institute was formally renamed and registered as the International Institute of Differing Civilizations – Institut international des civilisations différentes on 19 February 1954.

The institute wanted to avoid all political and economic influences, and study problems objectively and scientifically. Participation of former colonies such as India, Pakistan and Indonesia helped show independence of imperialist views. However, although the institute was well-meaning and idealistic, when discussing the development plans of backward countries its conclusions were very theoretical and of little or no practical use. Thus, the 1951 conference concluded that:

Plans should aim to develop internal trade, associating production with a more skilled local labor force, raising the standard of living of consumers, and consequently stabilizing an economy made less dependent on foreign trade...
The plans can only be successful with the collaboration of the beneficiary populations whose interest and goodwill must be aroused, and whose conceptions and ways of life must also be respected, insofar as they are not in contradiction with the necessities of a modern society; in particular, proletarianization and population displacements which are not essential, will be avoided, and careful attention will be paid to the adaptation of social frameworks to modern production processes, or to progress.

The institute seems to have become inactive in 1980.

== Sample sessions ==
- At the 1911 session Arthur Girault (Note: Arthur Girault was to become professor of law at Poitiers from 1923 until 1931. His Principles of Colonization and Colonial Legislation (1895) ran to five editions and was uses as a textbook for thousands of colonial administrators.) presented a report on recruiting colonial officials, including those of the judiciary.
- The International Colonial Institute held its 24th biennial session in Rome in June 1939, chaired by Luigi Federzoni. Attendees discussed the nutrition of natives, the juridical situation of native women and the financial contribution of natives to the expenses of administration. For different reasons, there were no representatives from France, the United States, Spain or Japan. The British representatives were Tracy Philipps and Henry Gollan.
- The 26th Study Session on the INCIDI took place in Paris on 12-15 March 1951. Topics included: Study of the various ways of sustaining cultural, economic and social development plans of underdeveloped territories; Political and social evolution of the autochthonous elites; The problem of languages, mainly in Africa, as an educational and cultural vehicle; Contact of civilizations: the experiences of the North American Continent.
- The 28th session of INCIDI was held from 7 to 10 September 1953 at the Hague. It was devoted to the study of rural rehabilitation in tropical and sub-tropical countries.
- The 34th ICIDI study session was held in Aix-en-Provence from 11 to 16 September 1967. One of the papers was on Urban agglomerations in the states of the Third World.

== Sources ==
- El Mechat, Samia (2011), "On Arthur Girault's Principes de Colonisation (1895)", Revue historique, 657 (657): 119–144, doi:10.3917/rhis.111.0119
- Girault, Arthur (1911), Institut colonial international... Rapport préliminaire à la session de 1911. Du recrutement des fonctionnaires coloniaux y compris ceux de l'ordre judiciaire (in French), Etablissements généraux d'imprimerie (Bruxelles)
- "Institut international des civilisations différentes (I.N.C.I.D.I.)", B.B.A.A. Boletín Bibliográfico de Antropología Americana (in French), 14 (1), Pan American Institute of Geography and History: 19–21, 1951, JSTOR 41576112
- Institut international des civilisations différentes (INCIDI), Union of International Associations (UIA)
- "International Colonial Institute", lonsea: League of Nations Search Engine, University of Heidelberg
- Marchetti, Jean-Michel (1974), "Les agglomérations urbaines dans les pays du Tiers Mondé : leur rôle politique, social et économique", Collection Ideric (Compte-rendu de la 34° session d'étude de l'Incidi tenue à Aix-en-Provence du 11 au 16 Septembre 1967), 1 (1), Institut International des Civilisations Differentes [INCIDI]: 13–14
- "Notes and News: Institut International des Civilisations Différentes", Africa (in French), 24 (2): 163, April 1954, doi:10.1017/S0001972000063336, S2CID 245916306
- Philipps, Tracy (1940). "The XXIVth Biennial Session of the Institut Colonial International, Rome, June 1939". Journal of the Royal African Society. 39 (154): 17–21. JSTOR 717911.
- Vinck, Honoré, ed. (1951), "Institut International des Civilisations Différentes", Aequatoria (in French), 14e Année (3): 109–111, JSTOR 25838119
