= Simon-Pierre Mpadi =

Simon-Pierre Mpadi (1909–after 1970) was a follower of Simon Kimbangu who later established his own Messianic Christian-inspired religious group in Congo.

== Life ==
Mpadi was originally part of the Salvation Army. In 1936 he became a follower of Simon Kimbangu, and his Church of Jesus Christ on Earth. In 1939 he formed a group called Mission des Noirs within Kimbangu's movement, this group was later known as the Khakista because of the khaki uniform they wore. Mpadi used his first name to claim a connection to Kimbangu similar to that of Simon Peter to Jesus Christ.

On 7 September 1939, in a declaration and written statement submitted to the local Belgian colonial administrator at Madimba (~ 90 km from the Belgian Congo capital Leopoldville), he and several hundred followers sent a message to the colonial masters that their days in the territory they occupied were numbered, and that the time had come for liberation and for natives to look after themselves. He was then arrested and imprisoned. In the mid-1940s Mpadi fled to the French Congo but was sent back to Belgian territories by the officials there.

While his numerous followers were sent to prisons for hard labour in Équateur (Befale, Ekafela, etc.) and some were conscripted to fight in World War II alongside Belgian troops, Mpadi was sent to serve his sentence at the Central Prison of the then Elizabethville (now Lubumbashi, Katanga province). Mpadi and his followers, along with all Kimbangu's imprisoned followers (e.g. Emmanuel Bamba), were set free by an official decree around the declaration of DRC's independence on 30 June 1960.

In 1960, he re-established his messianic movement in the south-western part of the DRC, the northern region of Angola and southern part of Congo-Brazzaville. Mpadi argued that his movement could only be a church, not a missionary movement in their own land. The movement later came to be known as the "Eglise des Noirs Afrique" (Church of Black people in Africa), with its headquarters at Ntendesi, later Songa-Ntela near Kasangulu, DRC.

Mpadi's sermons and religious message emphasized the messianic and prophetic leadership of Simon Kimbangu as the liberator of all Black people in the world. From the mid-70s, though still monotheist he oriented his movement towards more traditional beliefs and history of past African prophets and warriors, no longer referring to Christianity or the Bible. He claimed that the new approach was not in contradiction with Kimbangu, but was Kimbangu's true philosophy. In the 21st century, there were still a few hundred followers of the movement.

== Sources ==
- Encyclopædia Britannica. 1984 Edition. Vol. VII, p. 75
- article on The Church of Jesus Christ on Earth
- Boahen, A. Adu. Africa Under Colonial Domination, 1880–1935 which is Vol. VII of General History of Africa. (Paris: UNESCO, 1990) p. 223
- Mbasani, Mbambi. "Etude biographique. Simon-Pierre Mpadi". Cahiers des Religions Africaines (Kinshasa, Zaïre), 1981, 15, N° 29, 103–25
- Sandiford, Keith A.P. A black studies primer: heroes and heroines of the African diaspora. (Hansib), 2008.
