= Nkamba =

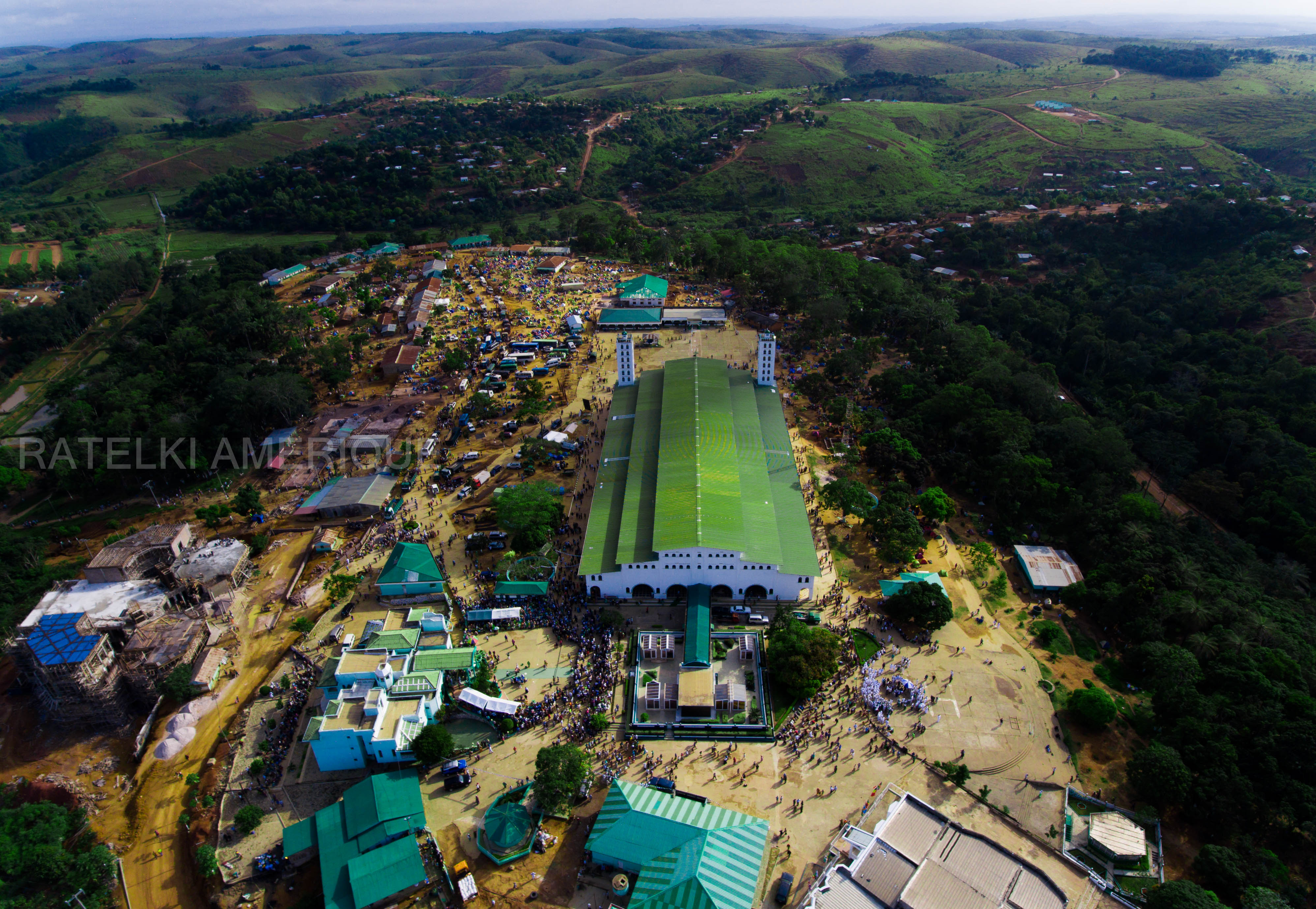
- View of the Temple at Nkamba in 2018

- Location in Democratic Republic of the Congo
- Coordinates: 05°01′34″S 14°35′33″E
- Country: DR Congo
- Province: Kongo Central
- Territory: Mbanza-Ngungu
- Sector: Ntimansi

Population
  - Total: ~10,000

Nkamba, also Nkamba New Jerusalem, is a town in the province of Kongo Central of the Democratic Republic of Congo.

The town is the birthplace of Simon Kimbangu and has become the spiritual headquarters of Kimbanguism. Adherents believe it to be the New Jerusalem spoken about in the Book of Ezekiel.The city is home to the temple of the Kimbanguist Church. Near the temple is the mausoleum of the founder "Papa" Simon Kimbangu and his three sons, "Papa" Charles Kisolokele Lukelo, "Papa" Salomon Dialungana Kiangani and "Papa" Joseph Diangienda Kuntima.
