= Kimbanguism =

Christian new religious movement

- French: Kimbanguisme
- The flag of EJCSK
- Type: New christian religious movement
- Classification: African initiated church
- Father: Simon Kimbangu Kiangani
- Region: Democratic Republic of Congo
- Language: French, Lingala, Kikongo
- Headquarters: Nkamba Kongo Central, Democratic Republic of Congo
- Founder: Simon Kimbangu
- Origin: April 1921
- Members: 20 million
- Other name: Jesus Christ's Church on Earth by his special envoy Simon Kimbangu
- Official website: https://www.jccesk.com/jccesk_home1.html

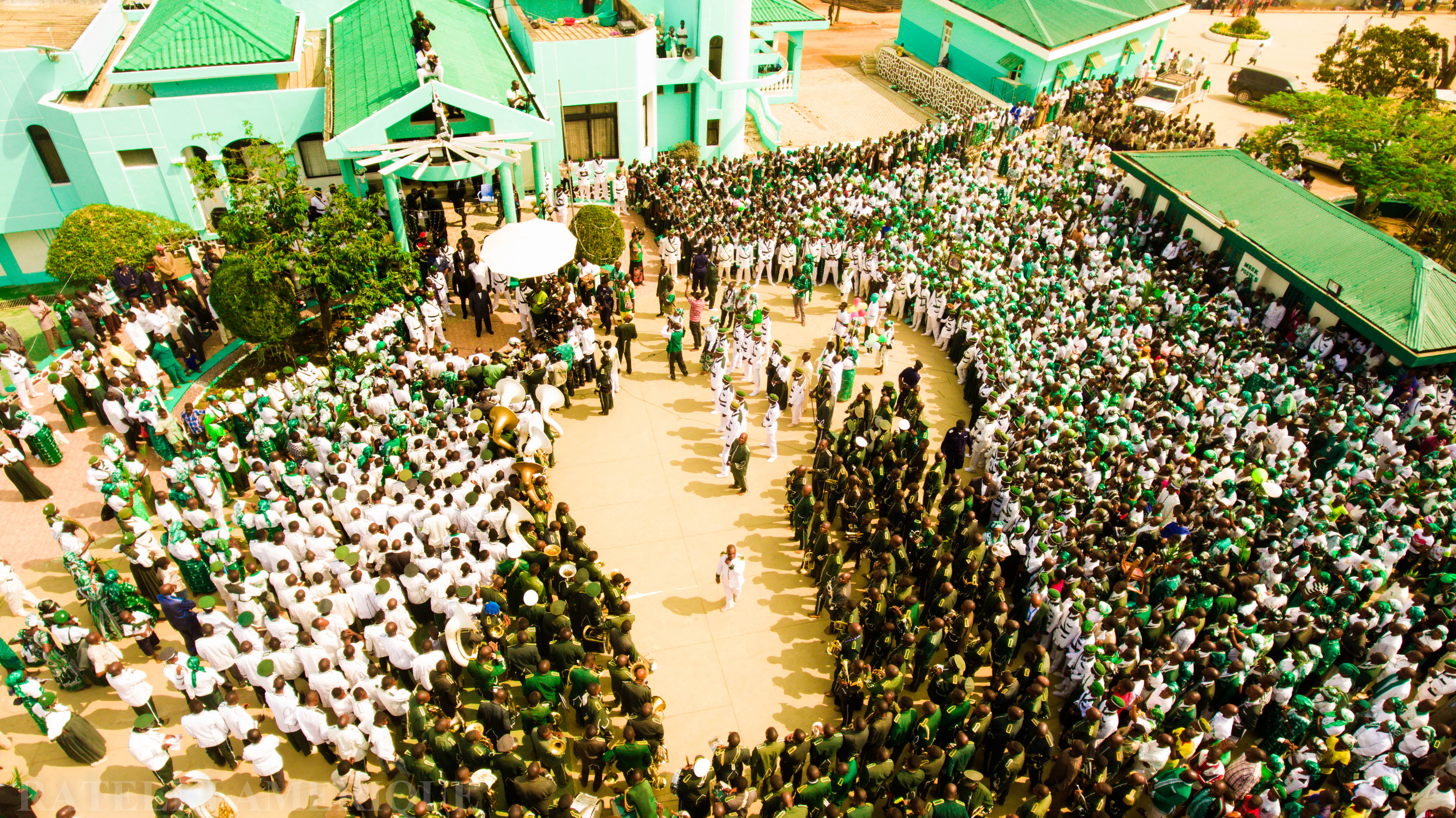
Members of the Kimbanguist Church in Nkamba celebrating Christmas, 25 May 2016. The church shifted observance of Christ's birth to the birthday of leader Salomon Dialungana, who is believed to be Christ reincarnated.

Kimbanguism (French: Kimbanguisme) is a para-Christian new religious movement professed by Jesus Christ's Church on Earth by his special envoy Simon Kimbangu (French: Église de Jésus Christ sur la Terre par son envoyé spécial Simon Kimbangu, EJCSK) founded by Simon Kimbangu in 1921 in the Belgian Congo, today the Democratic Republic of the Congo.

A large, independent African-initiated church, it has an estimated 6 million believers and has its headquarters in Nkamba, Kongo Central. Some statisticians have estimated that the number of Kimbanguists to be thirty two million. The denomination became a member of the World Council of Churches, the All Africa Conference of Churches, and the Organization of African Instituted Churches. In June 2021, the World Council of Churches withdrew membership on doctrinal grounds.

== History ==
In April 1921, Kimbangu, a Baptist mission catechist, inaugurated a mass movement through his supposed miraculous healings and biblical teaching. His teachings attracted working people, who left jobs to hear him speak about liberation. This threatened the colonial labor structure and thus the Belgian regime.

The Belgian authorities treated the faith with suspicion. They imprisoned Kimbangu until his death in 1951. The church was formally recognised by the Belgian colonial authorities in 1959.

Some smaller, more loosely organised groups in Central Africa regard Kimbangu as God's prophet.

=== Life and works of Kimbangu ===
According to the church, Kimbangu is said to have come down to Earth from Mount Zion as a Congolese infant. His father had been a traditional religious leader, but both parents died and Kimbangu was orphaned and put in the care of his maternal aunt. She took him to a Baptist missionary school where he studied for many years, until he grew up and became a preacher.

== Beliefs and practices ==
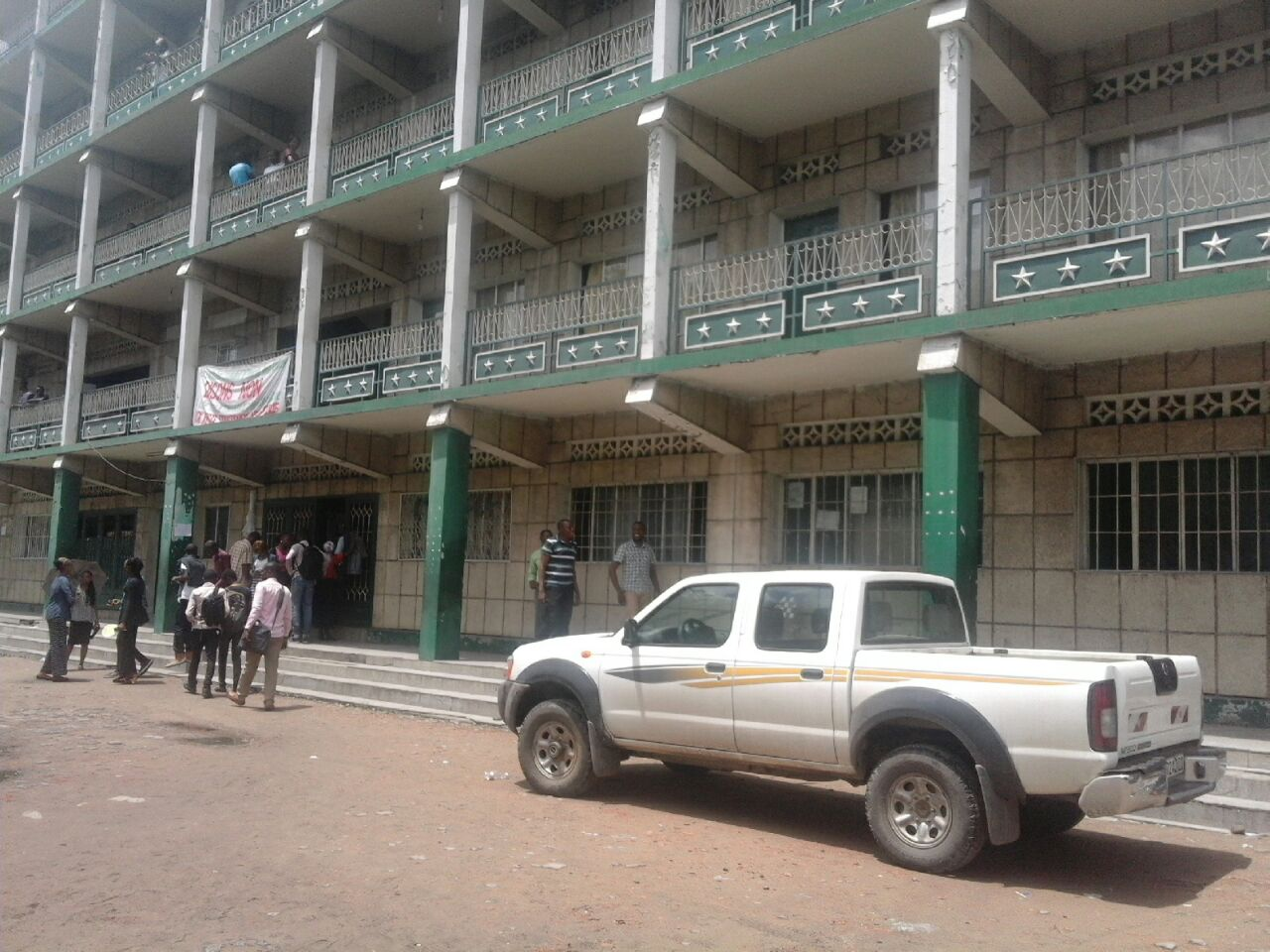
Kimbanguist university in Kalamu, Kinshasa, Democratic Republic of the Congo.

The church eschews politics and embraces Puritan ethics, rejecting the use of violence, polygamy, magic and witchcraft, alcohol, tobacco, and dancing. Its worship is Baptist in form. The Eucharist was introduced in 1971.

The three key dates in the Kimbanguist calendar are 6 April (marking the date of the start of the ministry of healing), 25 May (marking Christmas, falling on the birthday of Father Dialungana), and 12 October (Kimbangu's death anniversary). The church is largely non-sacramental, with large services that are well-organised.

The church believes that Nkamba is the New Jerusalem mentioned in the Bible.

The church believes that Kimbangu is the Holy Spirit, in accordance with John 14:15–17. Like many Christian groups, the Kimbanguists begin and end prayers with the Trinitarian formula.

The doctrinal status given by this church to Kimbangu has led to international controversy as contrary to the doctrine of the Trinity, and therefore heretical. In 2021, the church’s membership in the World Council of Churches (WCC) was discontinued by the Central Committee of the WCC on theological grounds.

=== The Trinity ===
Alongside Kimbangu, the Trinity are:

- Father Kisolokele, the first son of Kimbangu, as God the Father
- Father Salomon Diangani Dialungana, the reincarnated Jesus and second son of Kimbangu
- Father Diangienda Kuntima, last son, reincarnation of Kimbangu and second human form of the Holy Spirit
- Father Simon Kimbangu Kiangani, the grandson of Kimbangu, third human form of the Holy Spirit, and current spiritual leader of the church since 2001.

== Hierarchy ==
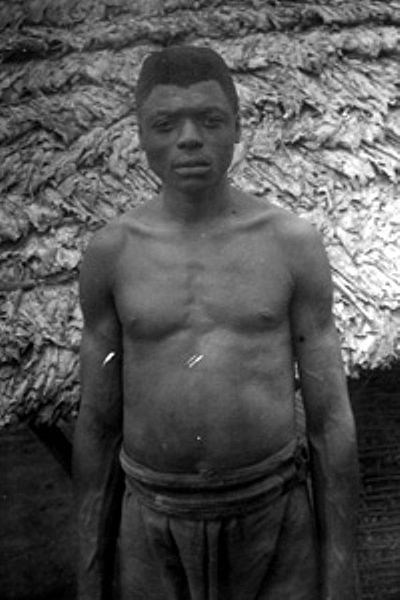
Simon Kimbangu

- The spiritual head (Diangienda)
- Adjunct spiritual heads (Dialungana and Kisolokele – the other sons of Simon Kimbangu)
- Bansadisi (healers)
- Legal representatives of churches in the various countries
- Regional representatives and their staffs
- Subregional representatives and their staffs
- Main parish ministers, evangelists and helpers
- Parish-section ministers, evangelists and helpers
- Congregants

== See also ==
- Mandombe script
- Simon-Pierre Mpadi
- Bundu dia Kongo
