= SS Sybil (1901) =

History
- Name: SS Sybil
- Operator: Uganda Railway 1903–29; Kenya and Uganda Railways and Harbours 1929–48; East African Railways and Harbours Corporation 1948–67
- Port of registry: (East Africa Protectorate) Kisumu
- Builder: Bow, McLachlan & Co, Paisley
- Launched: 1903
- Completed: 1901
- In service: 1903
- Fate: Scuttled 1967

General characteristics
- Type: Passenger & cargo ship
- Tonnage: 812 GRT
- Displacement: 500 tons
- Length: 189 ft (58 m)
- Beam: 29 ft (8.8 m)
- Installed power: Two triple expansion engines
- Propulsion: Screw propeller

SS Sybil was a cargo and passenger Lake Victoria ferry in East Africa.

The Uganda Railway had begun shipping operations on the lake in 1901 with the launch of the 110 ton SS William Mackinnon, built by Bow, McLachlan and Company of Paisley in Renfrewshire, Scotland. She was a small general purpose vessel but the company wished to establish more substantial ferry operations. Accordingly, even before William Mackinnon was launched the company ordered the much larger Winifred and Sybil from the same builder.

Bow, McLachlan built Sybil and her sister ship SS Winifred in 1901. They were "knock down" vessels; that is, each was bolted together in the shipyard at Paisley, all the parts marked with numbers, disassembled into many hundreds of parts and transported in kit form by sea to Kenya for reassembly. Sybil was launched on the lake in 1903.

In the First World War East African Campaign Winifred and Sybil were armed as gunboats but in 1914 Sybil struck a rock and had to be beached. She was refloated in 1915 and refitted and returned to service in 1916.

After the Armistice Winifred and Sybil returned to civilian service. By now the company had three larger ferries: the 1,134 ton SS Clement Hill (1907) and 1,300 ton sister ships SS Rusinga and SS Usoga (both 1913). These younger ships therefore worked the busiest routes. In 1924 Sybil was stripped of her engine and accommodation and converted into a lighter.

In the 1950s Sybil sank at her moorings but she was raised, restored as a passenger and cargo vessel and in 1956 re-entered service. In 1967 the East African Railways and Harbours Corporation scuttled her at Kisumu to form a breakwater.
