= Lake Victoria ferries =

Ferry service carrying passengers throughout Lake Victoria

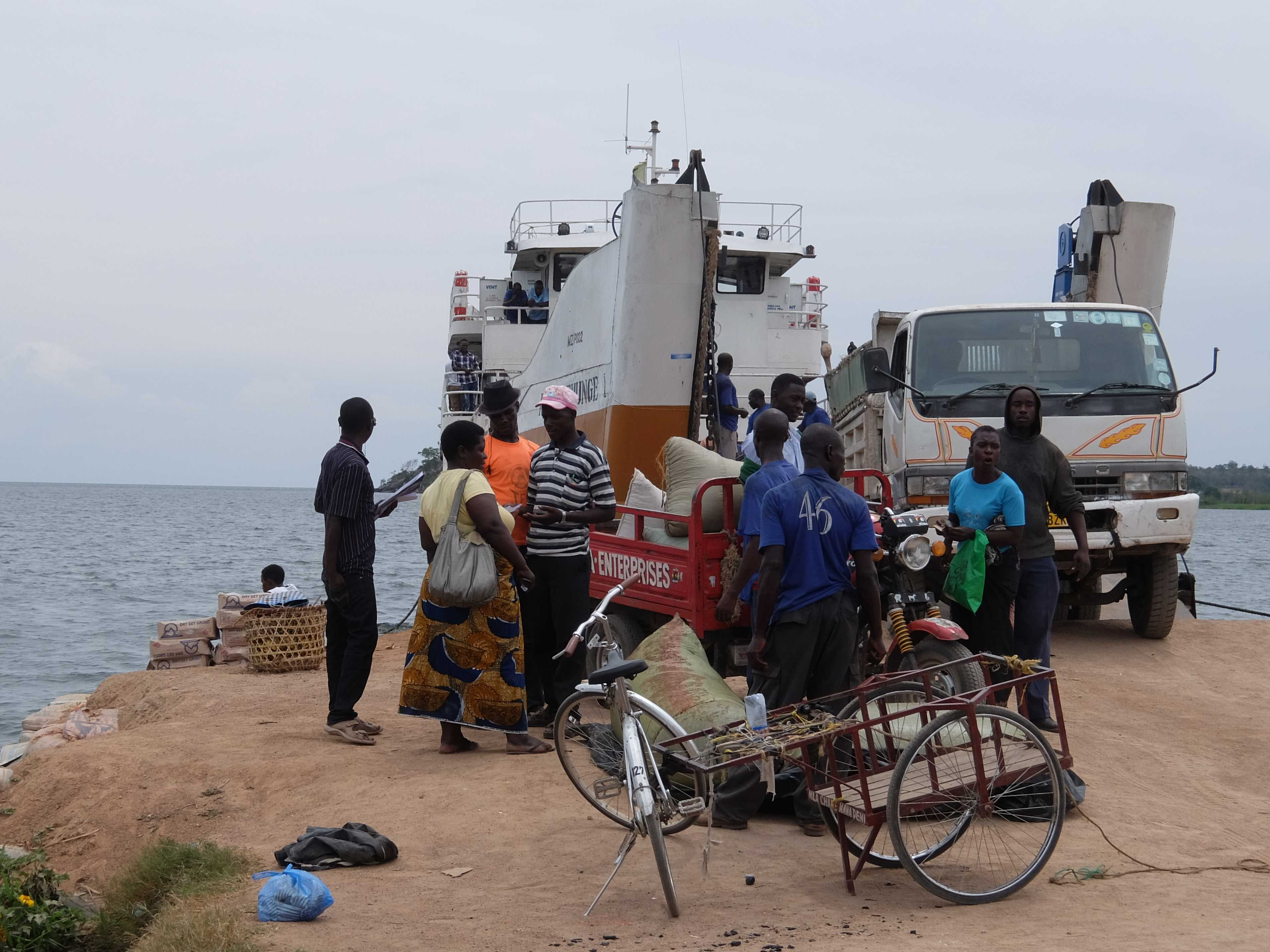
MV Nyehunge in the port of Nansio, Tanzania.

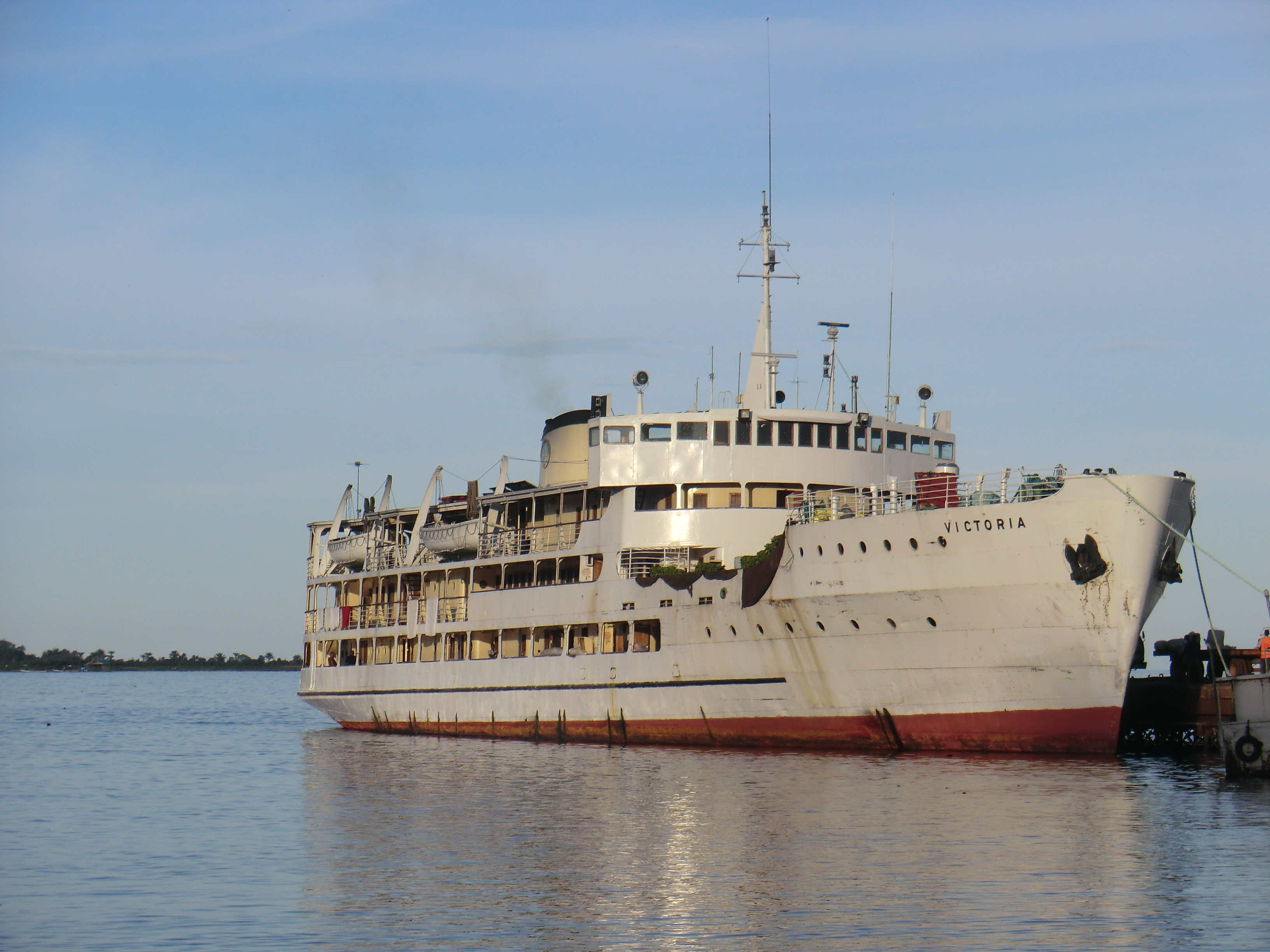
MV Victoria in Bukoba, Tanzania.

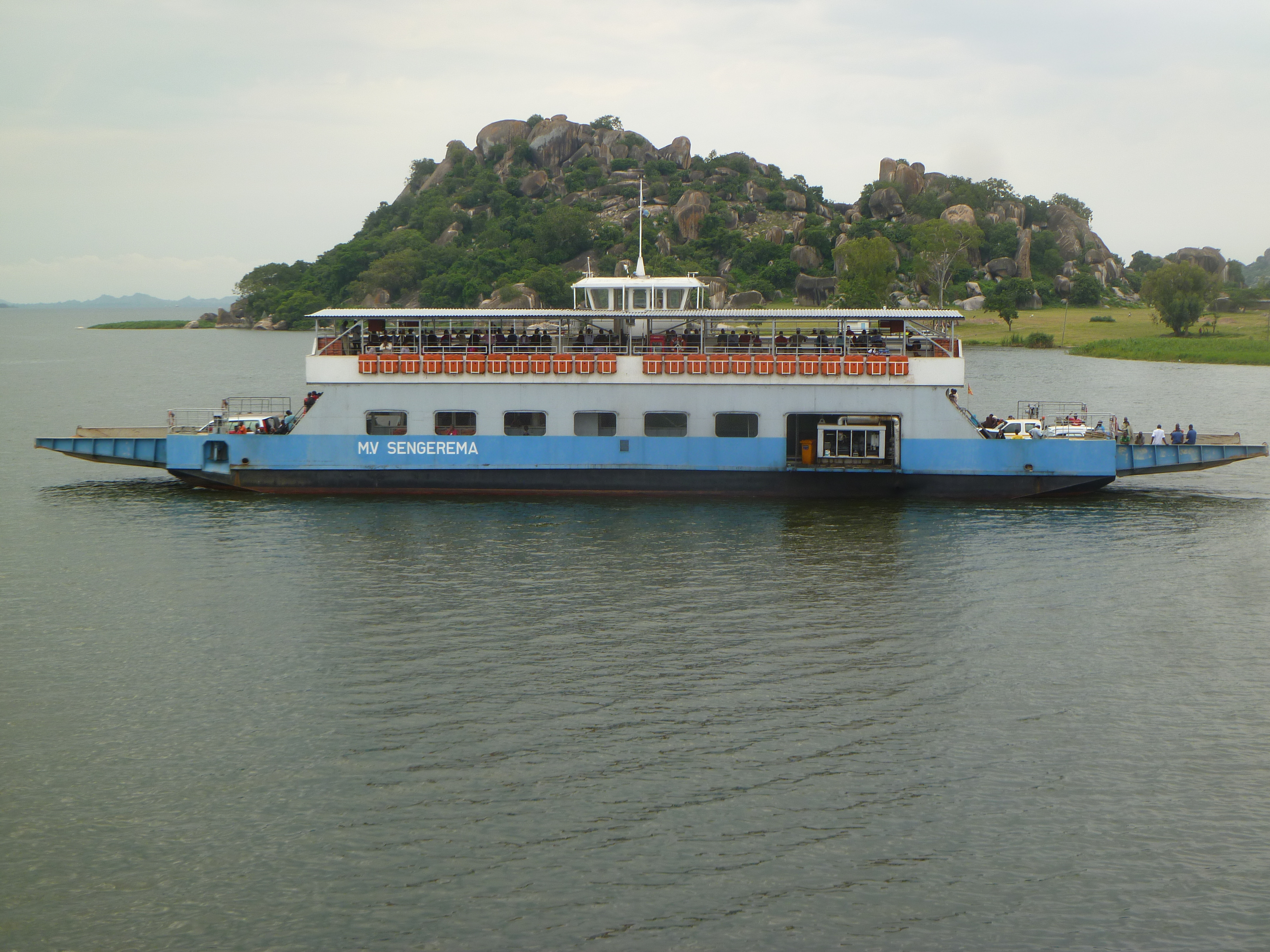
MV Sengerema at Mwanza, Tanzania.

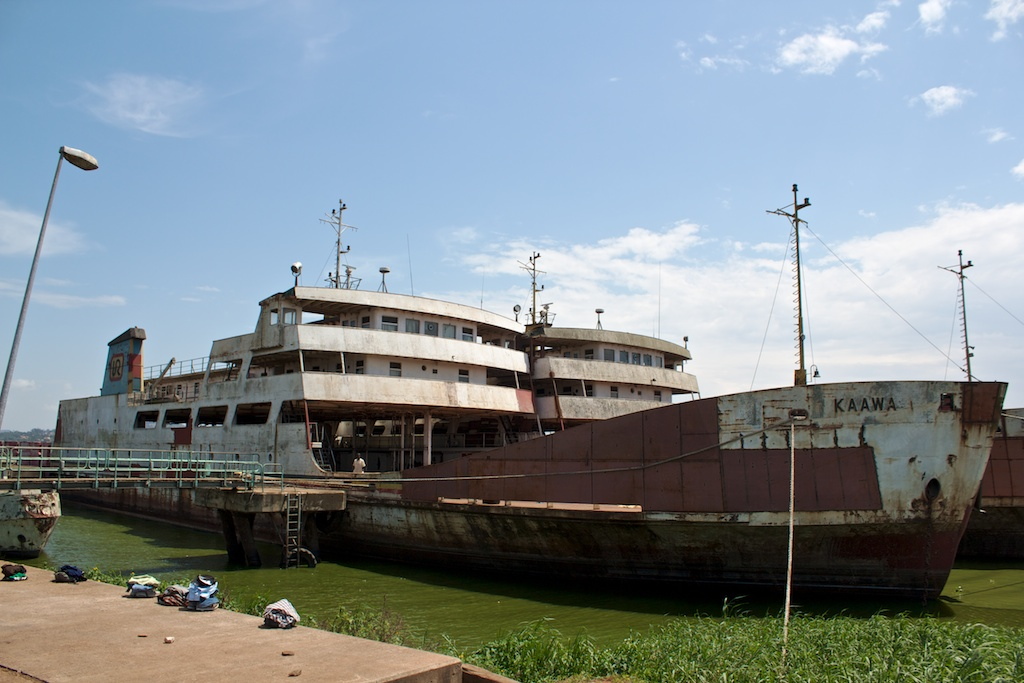
MV Kaawa in Port Bell, Uganda.

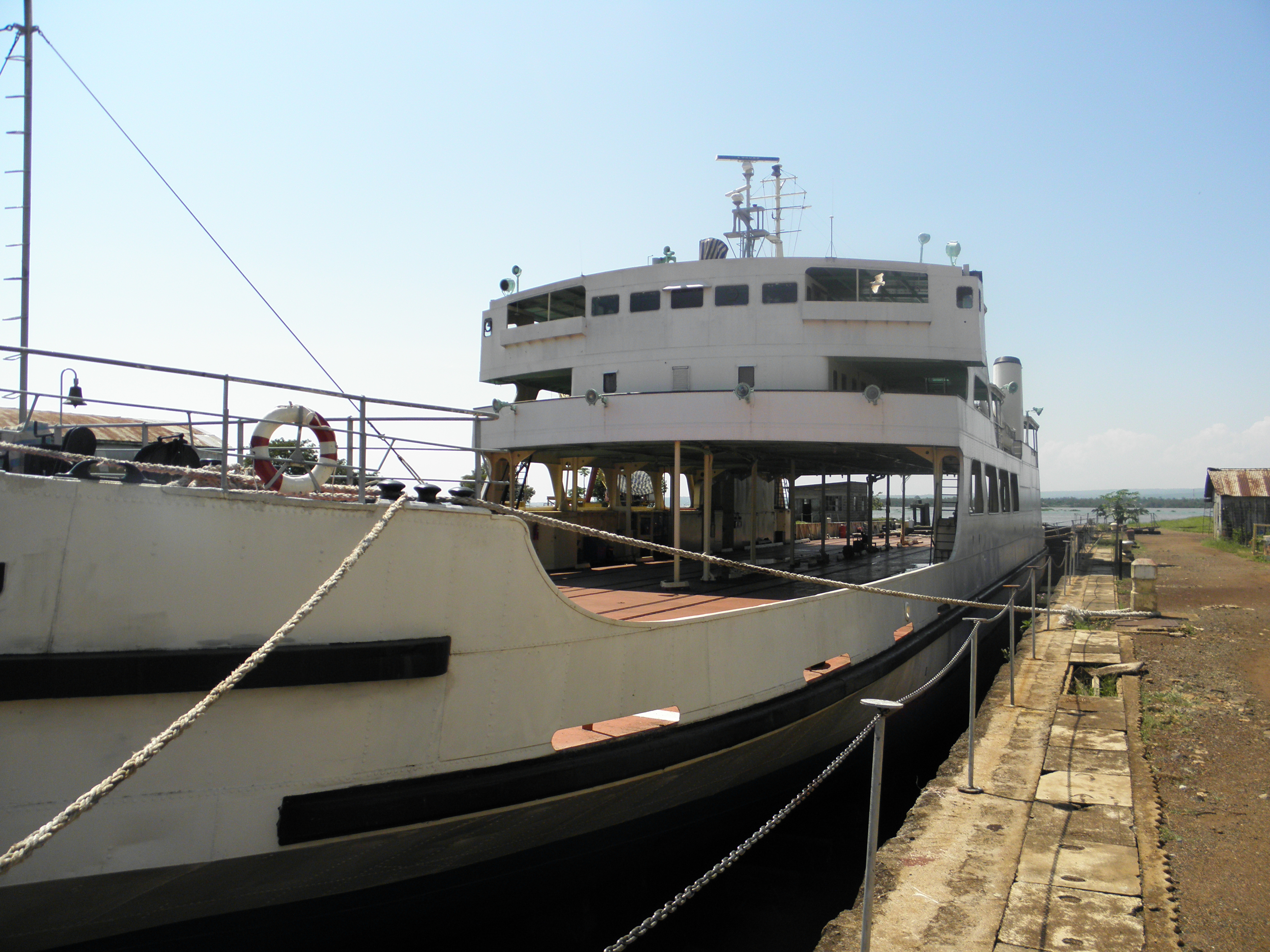
MV Uhuru at Kisumu Docks in Kenya.

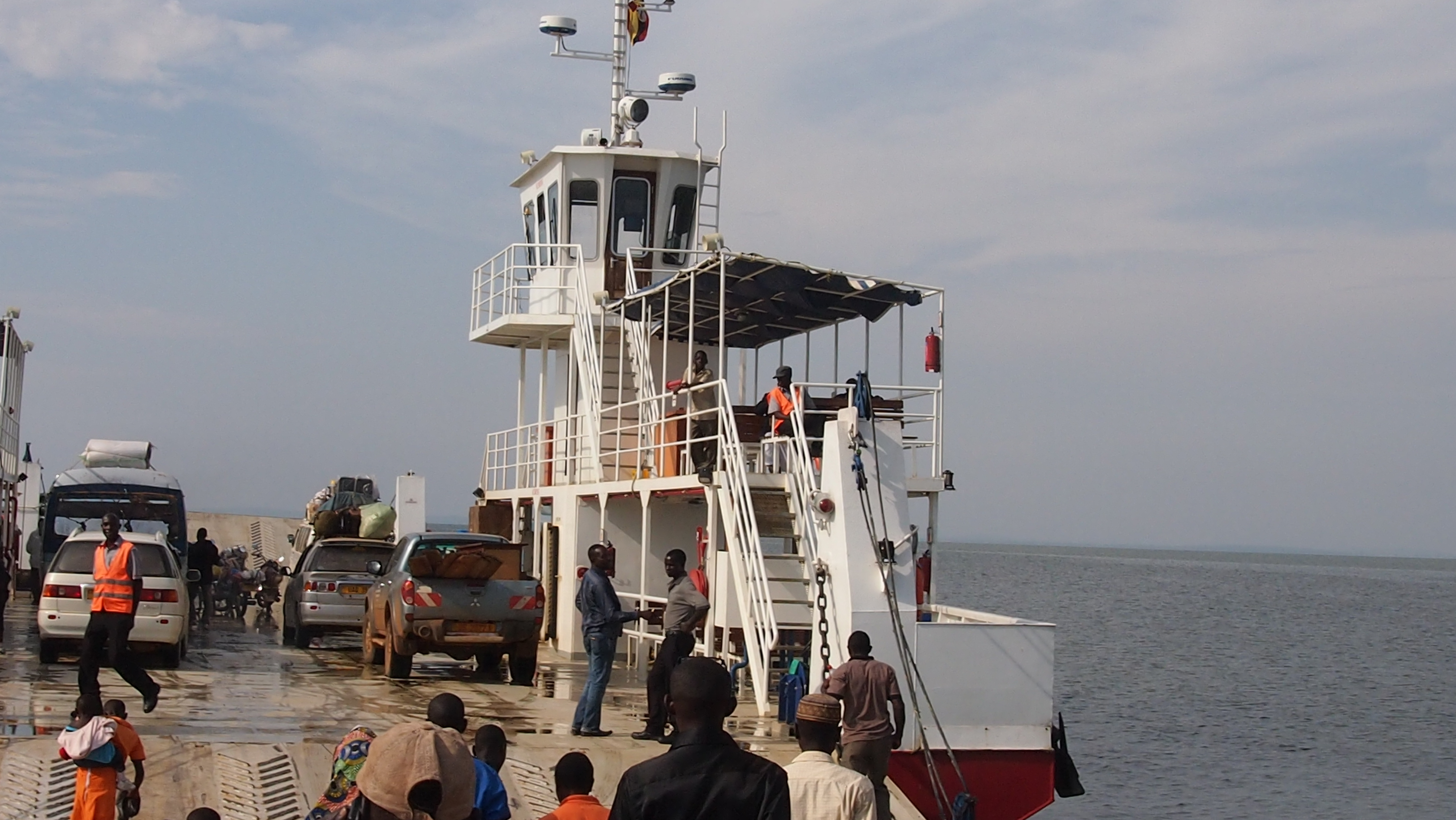
MV Pearl in Uganda.

Lake Victoria ferries are motor ships (earlier examples were steamboats) for ferry services carrying freight and/or vehicles and/or passengers between Uganda, Tanzania, and Kenya on Lake Victoria.

Operating ferries on Lake Victoria are mostly Ro-Pax ferries for the simultaneous transport of passengers, vehicles and goods. Some other ferries are dedicated train ferries, Ro-Ro ferries and cargo ships, as well as catamarans for passenger transport.

For most of the 20th century, Lake Victoria ferries were international ferries operating clockwise or counterclockwise around Lake Victoria. In the 21st century, ferries are mostly operating domestically within the borders of Kenya, Uganda or Tanzania and between mainland ports and Lake Victoria islands.

== Ports and port infrastructure ==
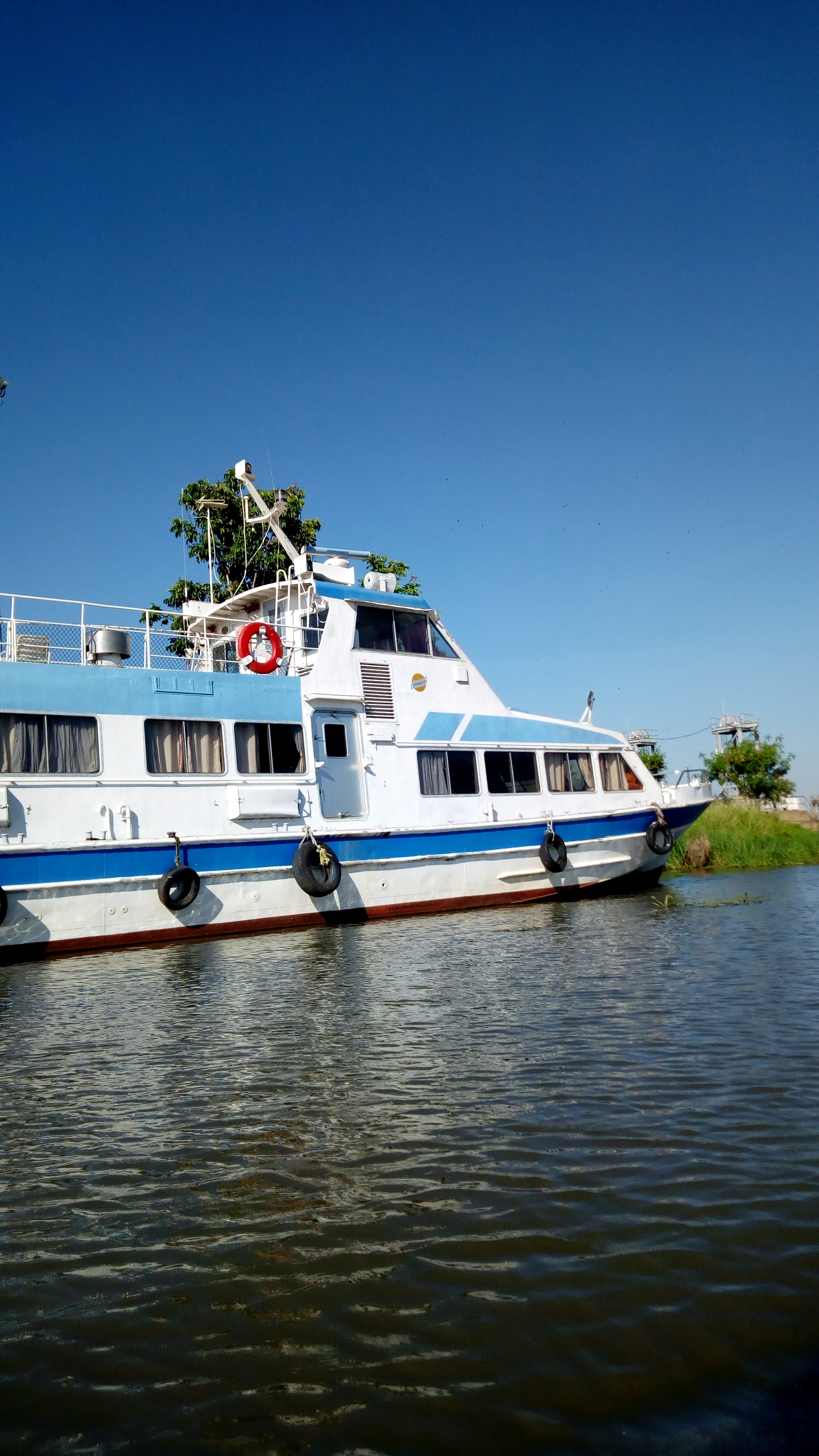
MV kipepeo at Kisumu

The main ports on the lake are in Kisumu in Kenya; Mwanza, Musoma, Bukoba in Tanzania; Entebbe, Port Bell and Jinja in Uganda. Many smaller Lake Victoria ports are also in use, the number of ports served by ferries in Tanzania alone reaches 30.

The four ports of Kisumu, Port Bell, Musoma and Mwanza allow dedicated train ferries to dock at railway ferry wharves with jetties for direct rail track access to the ferries. The track gauge for the transported railway wagons is 1,000 mm (3 ft 3 3/8 in). In 2018, two of the railway wharves, at Port Bell and Mwanza, were in use. The train ferries connect the Uganda Railway at Port Bell with the Tanzanian Central Line at Mwanza. The Central Line is linked to the Tanzanian Indian Ocean port of Dar es Salaam to transport freight to and from world markets. The rail jetties at Kisumu and Musoma connect to railyards in the port areas, but these are rarely used as there are no operational railways in their hinterlands. Typical journey times were 13 hours between Port Bell and Kisumu, and 19 hours between Port Bell and Mwanza.

The most important Lake Victoria port by far is Kisumu not only because of the port infrastructure, rail and road access to the Indian Ocean but also because of major facilities for ferry operation, service and construction. Dedicated dry docks for ferry repairs exist in or near Mwanza, Kisumu and Port Bell, but only those in Kisumu are consistently used.

== Ferries History ==
The first ferry on Lake Victoria started operation in 1900s during the British colonial era, from the port of Kisumu. The original steamboats were later replaced by motor ships, some of which still operate on the lake. Almost all ferries (trains, cargo, passenger) in operation at the end of the 20th century were decades old. In 2018, most of them were still in operation. Newer 21st century-built ferries made up the majority of all ferries on Lake Victoria as of 2018. The number of ferries known to be in commercial operation in 2018 was about thirty in Tanzania, five in Uganda, and six in Kenya.

The largest ferries for the transport of cargo on Lake Victoria are the train ferries MV Umoja, MV Uhuru, MV Kaawa and MV Pemba engaged in international services between Tanzania, Uganda and Kenya. Each of them is able to transport 1180 tonnes of goods or 22 long rail waggons in four lanes (four tracks). In 2018, Umoja and Kaawa were in use between Port Bell and Mwanza, but the two ferries Pemba and Uhuru were suspended. The largest passenger ship on Lake Victoria is MV Victoria, which can transport up to 1200 passengers. These five vessels are between 30 and 60 years old and state-owned.

New Ro-Pax and Ro-Ro multipurpose ferries have continued to come into operation in recent years, built and assembled in Mwanza in Tanzania. These ferries have increased in size and capacity over the years, with the newest additions coming close to the older large train ferries. Two new Tanzanian state-owned Ro-Pax ferries, Misungwi (2016) and Mwanza (2018), can each transport up to 1000 passengers including up to 36 cars or up to 250 tonnes of cargo. The largest privately owned ferry on Lake Victoria is a new Tanzanian Ro-Pax ferry from 2016, the Nyehunge II with a transport capacity of 284 tonnes of goods or 40 cars and 500 passengers.

Apart from the motor vessels listed below, two steam ships more than 100 years old are reported to be still present on Lake Victoria in 2018, both in private hands: SS Nyanza and SS Rusinga, though Nyanza is suspended from operation in 2018.

Motor Vessels on Lake Victoria (2018)
| Country | Operator | List of Vessels, in operation or in ~~suspension~~ |
|---|---|---|
| Tanzania | TEMESA | MV Musoma; MV Mara; MV Ruvuvu; MV Kyanyabasa; MV Misungwi; MV Nyerere; MV Sengerema; MV Sabasaba; MV Ukara; MV Mwanza; MV Kiu; MV Ujenzi; MV Temesa; MV Kome II; MV Tegemeo; MV Chato |
| Tanzania | Marine Services Company | MV Butiama; MV Clarias; ML Maindi; MT Nyangumi; MV Serengeti; MV Umoja; MT Ukerewe; MV Victoria; ML Wimbi |
| Tanzania | Nyehunge IT Support Ltd | MV Nyehunge; MV Nyehunge II |
| Tanzania | Kamanga Ferry Ltd | MV Thor; MV Orion; MV Orion II |
| Uganda | Earthwise Ferries Ltd | MV Amani; MV Bluebird |
| Uganda | Uganda Railways Corporation | ~~MV Pemba~~; MV Kaawa |
| Uganda | Kalangala Infrastructure Services Ltd | MV Pearl; MV Ssese |
| Uganda | Nation Oil Distributors Ltd | MV Kalangala |
| Kenya | Kenya Railways Corporation | MV Uhuru; MV Uhuru II |
| Kenya | Mbita Ferries Ltd | MV Mbita; MV Uzinza |
| Kenya | Globology Ltd | MV Captain Dan; MV Ringiti; MV Atego; MV Sigulu |

The 20th century ferries have almost entirely been designed and built outside Africa, mostly in the UK and Germany but were assembled at Lake Victoria from pre-assembled parts. Most of the ferries delivered to several operators around Lake Victoria in the 21st century however have been designed and built in Tanzania through construction firms with dockyards and floating dry docks located at Mwanza port. Most new ro-ro ferries on Lake Victoria have been built by local Songoro Marine Transport Ltd, a company with construction services in Mwanza. Outside Mwanza, a new Kenyan company based in Kisumu, Globology Ltd, is planning to build and to operate up to 15 passenger-only catamaran passenger ferries until 2020.

== Ferry history ==
=== Uganda Railway steamers ===
The original ships serving the Uganda Railway were built in the United Kingdom as "knock down" ships; that is, they were bolted together, all the parts marked with numbers, disassembled into thousands of parts, transported in kit form by sea to Mombasa and by railway to Kisumu and reassembled.

SS William Mackinnon was built for the Imperial British East Africa Company in 1890 by Bow, McLachlan and Company at Paisley in Scotland but not launched at Kisumu until 1900. In the First World War, she was armed as a gunboat. In 1929, she was withdrawn from service, taken into deep water and scuttled.

The sister ships SS Winifred and SS Sybil were built by Bow, McLachlan & Co in 1901. Winifred was launched on the lake in 1902 followed by Sybil in 1903. In the First World War East African Campaign, they were armed as gunboats. In 1914, Sybil was beached after striking a rock but she was refloated in 1915 and refitted and returned to service in 1916. In 1924, Sybil was converted into a lighter. Winifred was purposely sunk in 1936 to form a breakwater off Luamba Island. Her remains were scrapped in 1954. In the 1950s, Sybil sank at her moorings but she was raised, restored as a passenger and cargo vessel, and in 1956 re-entered service. In 1967, Sybil was purposely sunk at Kisumu to form a breakwater.

SS Clement Hill was built by Bow, McLachlan & Co in 1905. She served on the lake from 1907 to 1935. In 1936 she was purposely sunk at Bukakata to form a breakwater.

SS Nyanza is a cargo steamer built by Bow, McLachlan & Co in 1907. She was reported to be laid up as of 2007.

SS Kavirondo is a tugboat built by Bow, McLachlan & Co in 1912 and launched at Kisumu in 1913. During the First World War, she served as a gunboat. In about 1984, she was laid up at Kisumu and later was used as an accommodation vessel. She later sank alongside, but in 2005 was raised. Her purchasers intended to lengthen and re-engine her for use as a tanker.

The sister ships SS Rusinga and SS Usoga were built by Bow, McLachlan & Co in 1913 and launched on the lake in 1914 and 1915, respectively. They were troop ships during the First World War East African Campaign and passed into civilian service after the Armistice. EAR&H withdrew Rusinga for scrap in 1966, but she passed into private ownership and in 2005 was still in service. Usoga was laid up in 1975, sank at her moorings at Kisumu in the 1990s, and as of 2006 her remains were still there.

SS Buganda and SS Buvuma were steamers built by Bow, McLachlan & Co in 1925. In the 1980s, Buvuma was laid up and sank at her jetty. Buganda later became additional accommodation at the Mwanza's Hotel Tilapia, where she remains.

=== East African Railways and Harbours motor vessels ===
RMS Victoria was built in 1959 by Yarrow Shipbuilders at Scotstoun and reassembled for the East African Railways and Harbours Corporation (EAR&H) ship at Kisumu in 1961. When the ship was commissioned, Queen Elizabeth II granted her the "Royal Mail Ship" designation: the only EAR&H ship to receive this distinction. However, since Kenya's independence from the UK, she has operated as MV Victoria.

The train ferries MV Umoja and MV Uhuru are sister ships built by Yarrow in 1965. Kenya operated Uhuru, but she has been suspended from service since 2007.

By 1970, the East African Railways and Harbours Corporation operated regular sailings clockwise around the lake from Kisumu, using rail ferries that carried rail wagons loaded directly from rail tracks extended on the jetties at Kisumu, Port Bell and Mwanza. The rail network linked to the Indian Ocean ports of Mombasa and Dar es Salaam which allowed countries of the African interior such as Uganda and Rwanda to transport freight to and from world markets. Typical journey times were 13 hours between Port Bell in Uganda and Kisumu in Kenya, and 19 hours between Port Bell and Mwanza in Tanzania.

In 1977 EARH was dissolved and its assets divided between Kenya, Tanzania, and Uganda. Uhuru was transferred to the new Kenya Railways Corporation (KRC) and Umoja and Victoria to the new Tanzania Railways Corporation (TRC). In 1978, the new Uganda Railways Corporation (URC) purchased three train ferries from Belgium, MV Pemba, MV Kaawa and MV Kabalega. However their production was interrupted by the war between Uganda and Tanzania that broke out in October 1978 and ended in April 1979. The ferries were assembled after the war at Port Bell and launched in 1983. TRC's Marine Division introduced the ferry MV Bukoba in about 1979 and the passenger and cargo ship MV Serengeti in 1988.

In 1997, the Marine Division of TRC became a separate company, the Marine Services Company, whose fleet includes Serengeti, Umoja, and Victoria.

=== 21st century vessels and operations ===
Early in the 21st century, new Lake Victoria ro-ro ferries were constructed at Mwanza port in Tanzania, in particular through the family-owned and local Songoro Marine Transport Ltd in Tanzania. This added some dynamics to the ferry services sector on Lake Victoria and allowed several private companies to own and/or to operate new ferries, for example the Nyehunge ferries by Mohammed Seif, the owner of Nyehunge IT Support Ltd. In 2005, Tanzania founded a new state-owned enterprise, Tanzania Electrical, Mechanical and Electronics Services Agency (TEMESA), which received more than a dozen new and locally built and state-owned ro-ro ferries on Lake Victoria to operate them.

Also in 2005, the private Rift Valley Railways Consortium (RVR) was selected by the two parastatal railway corporations in Kenya (KRC) and Uganda (URC) to operate their joint railway network from 2006 on. RVR also took over the three remaining Lake Victoria train ferries of Uganda and Kenya (Kabalega sank in 2005), Pemba, Uhuru and Kaawa. RVR suspended Pemba and Kaawa from service indefinitely and also stopped Uhuru from all operations in 2007 after the railway branch line of the Uganda Railway between Kisumu and Nakuru dropped out of operations due to an aging railway infrastructure. The Lake Victoria railheads in Port Bell, Jinja and Kisumu, then also operated by RVR, went out of operation. The remaining Tanzanian train ferry, MV Umoja could only serve Tanzanian rail jetties and became almost suspended as well and was used for special purposes only. Except from the Tanzanian ferry business, which started to flourish due to the new ferries built and put into operation, the Ugandan and Kenyan ferry business on Lake Victoria appeared to be dilapidated.

In May 2008, the Daily Monitor stated that it expected the Ugandan government to announce in that year's budget speech a government allocation of USh 14 billion to buy a new train ferry to replace Kabalega. However, in September 2009, the Uganda Radio Network said the Ugandan government was unlikely to replace Kabalega soon. Instead, the Minister of Works proposed to improve port facilities at Jinja and Port Bell and let private operators run railway car floats with greater capacity than the ferries. The minister stated that Kaawa and Pemba would be reconditioned and returned to service and that private businesses had expressed an interest in raising Kabalega and restoring her to use as a private concession. In October 2009, the Ugandan government reiterated that it would recondition the Pemba and Kaawa and return them to service in 2010 and 2011 respectively. However, no activities followed the announcements.

In 2010, new international passenger ferry services based on catamarans were to be launched. A US based company, Earthwise Ventures, announced that it would bring a fleet of fast ferries to Lake Victoria to connect major ports on the lake. Later on, the private Earthwise Ferries Ltd with branches in Tanzania and Uganda started to operate the first catamaran passenger ferry on Lake Victoria in 2012, the MV Amani at Port Bell in Uganda, followed by a sister ship in 2018, the Bluebird at Mwanza port in Tanzania. Also in 2010, a Scottish investor, Malcolm Ormiston, founded Globology Ltd in Kisumu, Kenya to build and to operate smaller catamaran passenger ferries to operate on Lake Victoria in Kenya and in Uganda under the brand name Waterbus East Africa. A first small and locally built catamaran, Captain Dan went into operation in 2010. In 2017, Globology intended to start to build 3-5 catamaran passenger ferries per year each with a capacity to transport 120 passengers.

As of April 2013, only Tanzania Railways' Central Line was operating freight rail services from Mwanza to Tabora, Dodoma and Dar es Salaam and therefore connecting the Lake Victoria freight services with the world market.

In 2017, the contract with RVR was cancelled in both Kenya and Uganda due to financial irregularities, both KRC and URC restarted the operations on their respective railway networks. URC also restarted the services at the railhead in Port Bell, the train ferry Kaawa was repaired and refurbished and put back into operation. In a similar manner, the train ferry Umoja on the Tanzanian side was repaired and refurbished. In June 2018, the EastAfrican reported that 1180-tonne Umoja began regular service again between Mwanza and Port Bell, plying the route 26 times every month. It is also expected that Kaawa, registered in Uganda, will join Umoja on the route. The Dar es Salaam to Kampala route costs US$65 per tonne, compared to US$90 per tonne on the Mombasa to Kampala route, as of June 2018. The Citizen (Tanzania), reported similar information.

== Incidents and accidents ==
- On 21 May 1996, MV Bukoba sank 30 nautical miles (56 km) off Mwanza. She was carrying many more passengers than the 430 passengers she was certificated for, and 894 people were killed.
- In the early hours of 8 May 2005, Kabalega and Kaawa collided almost head-on. Kaawa damaged her bow and Kabalega suffered damage to her bow and flooding in two of her buoyancy tanks. Kaawa managed to return to port, but a few hours after the collision, Kabalega sank about 8 nautical miles (15 km) southeast of the Ssese Islands. After the collision MV Pemba was also suspended from service.
- On 28 April 2006, MV Nyamageni capsized. She was a cargo and passenger ferry owned by the Dynamic Cotton Ginnery of Mwanza in Tanzania. She was carrying more than forty passengers, 28 of whom were feared dead.
- In February 2013, fire broke out on the MV Victoria whilst docked at Mwanza Port. It is believed that it was due to the welding works going on in one of the lower deck rooms and sparks of fire then passed on to the adjacent storage compartment. The situation was under control within two hours. The Surface and Marine Transport Regulatory Authority (SUMATRA) blamed the management for professional negligence.
- On 10 October 2014, MV Victoria experienced an engine failure midway on its journey from Bukoba to Mwanza.
- On 20 September 2018, at least 228 people died when the overloaded motor ferry MV Nyerere, carrying "close to 270 passengers", capsized on Lake Victoria between Ukerewe Island and Ukara Island, Tanzania, 50 metres (55 yd) from the pier on Ukara Island. About 41 people were rescued, with 32 sustaining critical injuries.
