= SS Winifred (1901) =

History
- Name: Winifred
- Operator: Uganda Railway 1902–29; Kenya & Uganda R&H 1929–36
- Port of registry: (East Africa Protectorate) Kisumu
- Builder: Bow, McLachlan & Co, Paisley
- Yard number: 155
- Launched: 12 February 1903
- Completed: 1902
- Maiden voyage: 17 February 1903
- In service: 1903–1936
- Fate: scuttled 1936; scrapped 1954

General characteristics
- Type: Passenger & cargo ship
- Tonnage: 662 GRT; 200 DWT
- Displacement: 600 tons
- Length: 175.0 ft (53.3 m)
- Beam: 29.0 ft (8.8 m)
- Draught: 6.6 ft (2.0 m)
- Depth: 9.0 ft (2.7 m)
- Installed power: 45 RHP, 500 ihp
- Propulsion: 2 × triple-expansion engines; 2 × screws
- Notes: sister ship: Sybil

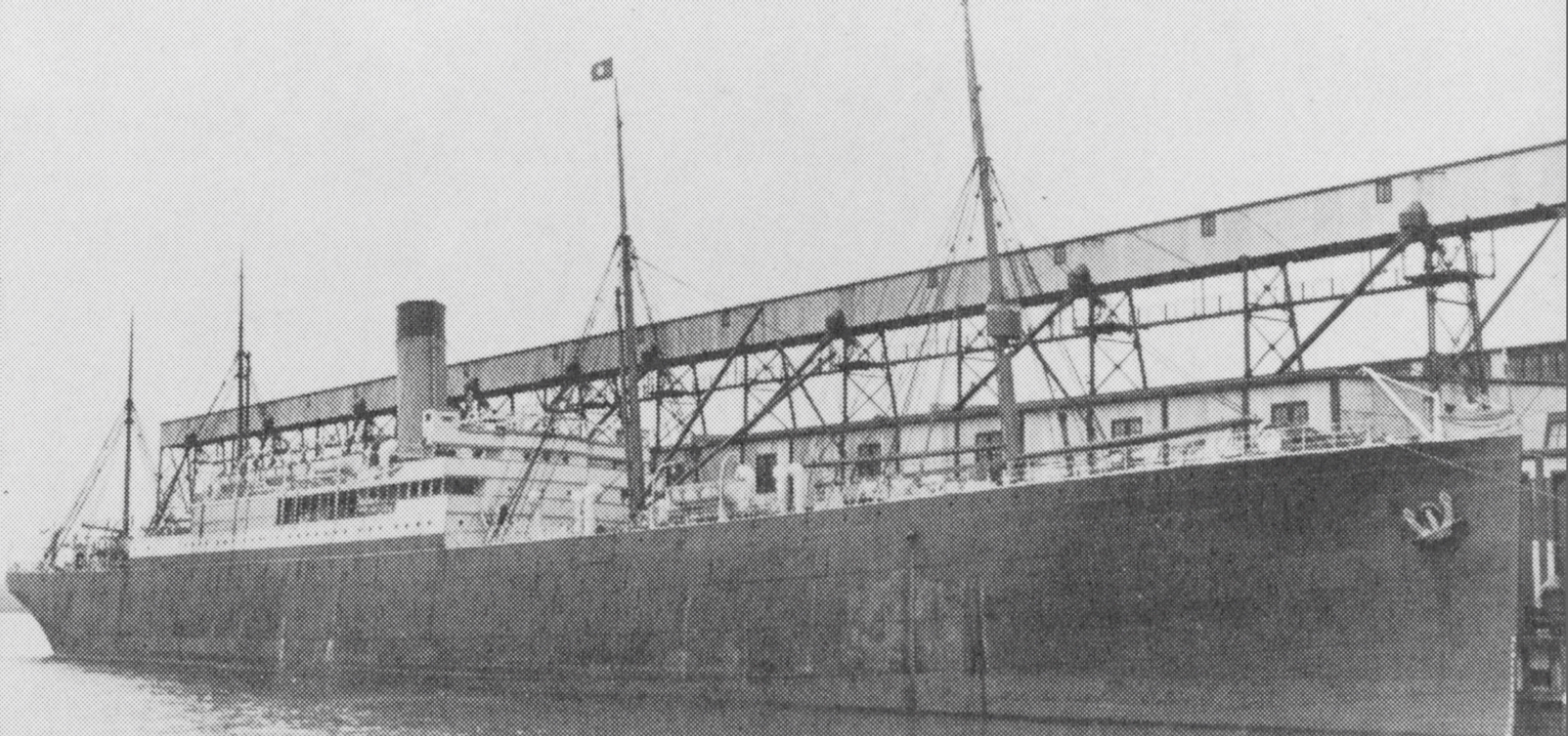
SS Winifredian Cargo ferry

SS Winifred was a cargo and passenger Lake Victoria ferry in East Africa.

The Uganda Railway had begun shipping operations on the lake in 1901 with the launch of the 110-ton William Mackinnon, built by Bow, McLachlan and Company of Paisley, Renfrewshire, Scotland. She was a small general purpose vessel but the company wished to establish more substantial ferry operations. Accordingly, even before William Mackinnon was launched the company ordered the much larger Winifred and her sister ship Sybil from the same builder.

Bow, McLachlan built Winifred and Sybil in 1901. They were "knock down" vessels; that is, each was bolted together in the shipyard at Paisley, all the parts marked with numbers, disassembled into many hundreds of parts and transported in kit form by sea to Kenya for reassembly. Winifred was launched on the lake on 12 February 1903 and Sybil two months later. He maiden voyage was a round-trip from Port Florence to Entebbe from 17 to 20 February 1903.

In the First World War East African Campaign Winifred and Sybil were armed as gunboats. After the Armistice they returned to civilian service. By now the company had three larger ferries: the 1,134 ton SS Clement Hill (1907) and 1,300 ton sister ships SS Rusinga and SS Usoga (both 1913), which therefore worked the busiest routes. However, on occasion Winifred or Sybil substituted for a larger ship, as for example in 1924 when Clement Hill was drydocked and Winifred temporarily took over its route between Kenya and Uganda.

Later Winifred was found to be unseaworthy. In 1936 Kenya and Uganda Railways and Harbours scuttled her to form a breakwater off Luamba Island. Her remains were scrapped in 1954.
