= MV Victoria (1959) =

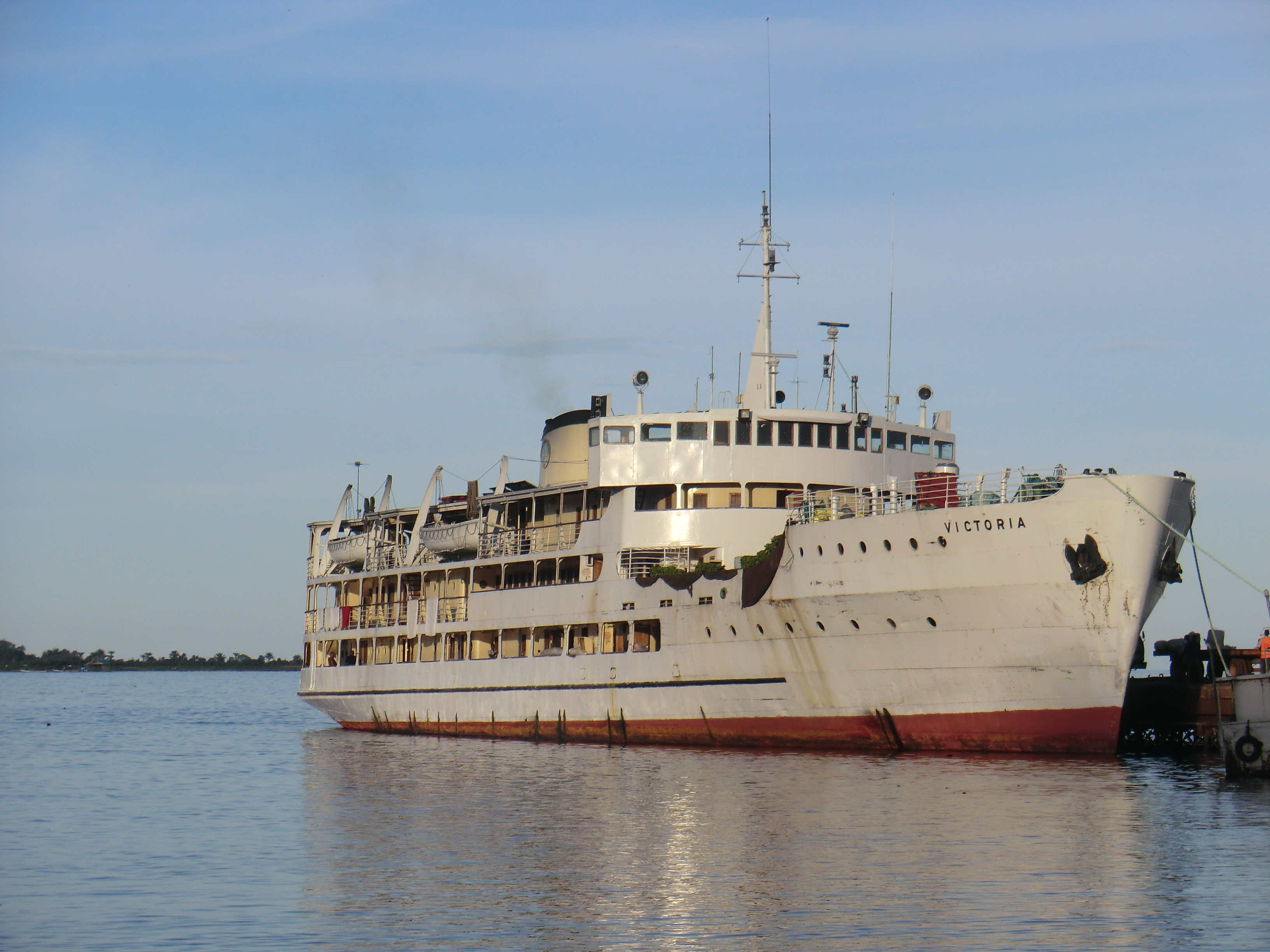
- Victoria anchored in Bukoba, Tanzania in 2012.

History

Kenya Colony
- Name: RMS Victoria
- Port of registry: Kisumu
- Route: around Lake Victoria
- Builder: Yarrow Shipbuilders
- Yard number: 2165
- Launched: 1959 (Paisley); 5 September 1960 (Kisumu)
- Completed: June 1961
- Commissioned: 22 July 1961

History

Kenya
- Name: Victoria
- Port of registry: Kisumu
- Fate: Transferred to Tanzania

History

Tanzania
- Name: Victoria
- Operator: Marine Services Company
- Port of registry: Mwanza
- Route: Mwanza – Bukoba
- Acquired: 1977
- Status: In service

General characteristics
- Type: Ferry
- Tonnage: 1,353 GRT
- Length: 261.3 ft (79.6 m)
- Beam: 40.0 ft (12.2 m)
- Height: 13.0 ft (4.0 m)
- Draught: 8.3 ft (2.5 m)
- Propulsion: twin Crossley diesel engines, twin screws
- Speed: 13.5 kn (25 km/h)
- Capacity: originally: 230 passengers; 200 tons of cargo

MV Victoria is a Lake Victoria ferry operated by the Marine Services Company of Tanzania.

Until Kenyan independence from the United Kingdom in 1963 she was the Royal Mail Ship RMS Victoria. She then operated under the Kenyan flag until 1977, when she was transferred to Tanzania.

== Building ==
Victoria was built as a "knock-down" ship. Yarrow Shipbuilders built her at Scotstoun, Glasgow, then dismantled her in June 1959. She was then exported in 1,500 crates via Mombasa to Kisumu on Lake Victoria, where her reassembly was begun in December 1959 and she was launched on 5 September 1960.

She was handed over to the East African Railways and Harbours Corporation (EAR&H) on 26 June 1961 and commissioned in 22 July. When the ship was commissioned Elizabeth II granted her the Royal Mail Ship (RMS) designation: the only EAR&H ship to receive this distinction.

== Service ==
When commissioned in 1961, Victoria had capacity for 230 passengers and 200 tons of freight and had refrigeration for perishable cargo. She took over the EAR&H's circular service around the ports of Lake Victoria, halving the total journey time to two and a half days which enabled her to serve all ports on the lake twice a week. EAR&H accordingly introduced new fares for passengers and rates for different classes of freight on her.

In 1977 EAR&H was divided between Kenya, Tanzania and Uganda and Victoria was transferred to the new Tanzania Railways. In 1997 TRC's inland shipping division became a separate company, Marine Services Company.

Victoria was refurbished and due to return to service between Bukoba and Mwanza in June 2020. The vessel started servicing the Mwanza-Bukoba route as planned in August 2020 under the name "New Victoria". After a scheduled annual inspection in September 2021 the ship resumed operations one month later.
