= Marine Services Company =

Passenger and cargo shipping company in Tanzania

Marine Services Company Limited
- Native name: Kampuni ya Huduma za Meli
- Formerly: TRC Marine Division
- Type: Parastatal
- Industry: Shipping, transportation
- Founded: 8 December 1997
- Headquarters: Mwanza, Tanzania
- Number of locations: 5
- Area served: African Great Lakes; Lake Victoria; Lake Tanganyika; Lake Nyasa
- Key people: Eric B. Hamissi(Ag. GM)
- Services: Passenger and cargo
- Total equity: TSh 1,000,000/= (nominal value)
- Owner: Treasury Registrar (100%)
- Website: www.mscl.go.tz

Marine Services Company Limited (MSCL) is a Tanzanian company that operates ferries, cargo ships and tankers on three of the African Great Lakes, namely Lake Victoria, Lake Tanganyika and Lake Nyasa. It provides services to neighbouring Burundi, DR Congo, Zambia and Malawi.

== History ==
Prior to its incorporation in 1997, MSCL was an integral part of the Tanzania Railways Corporation, which was formed in 1977 after the dissolution of the East African Railways and Harbours Corporation.

On 21 May 1996, MV Bukoba capsized while travelling from Bukoba to Mwanza due to overloading. At least 723 people died.

== Corporate affairs ==
MSCL is wholly owned by the Tanzanian Government via the Treasury Registrar and operates under the auspices of the Ministry of Transport. Its share capital consists of 1,000 shares each with a nominal value of TSh 1,000/=. The company's head office is in the northern city of Mwanza at the shores of Lake Victoria. It maintains two branch offices in Kigoma and Kyela; and liaison offices in Dar es Salaam and Kampala.

== Services ==
Passenger services on Lake Tanganyika to neighbouring countries include Mpulungu in Zambia; Bujumbura in Burundi; and Kalemie, Uvira and Baraka in the Democratic Republic of the Congo. The company also plies on Lake Nyasa between Mbamba Bay in southern Tanzania and Nkhata Bay in Malawi.

Between July 2013 and April 2014, MSCL transported 231,866 passengers and 41,234 tonnes of cargo.

== Fleet ==
Most of its fleet is located on Lake Victoria and includes MV Victoria, the former Royal Mail Ship. MV Liemba (formerly the Imperial German Navy's SMS Graf von Goetzen) was built in 1913 and still operates on Lake Tanganyika. The company's livery appears to be the same as TRC's predecessor, the East African Railways and Harbours Corporation: white hull above the waterline, white superstructure and buff funnel. The hull below the waterline appears to be dark red.

=== Current ===
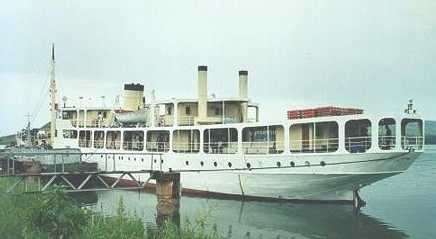
MV Liemba, built in 1913, is the oldest vessel in the fleet.

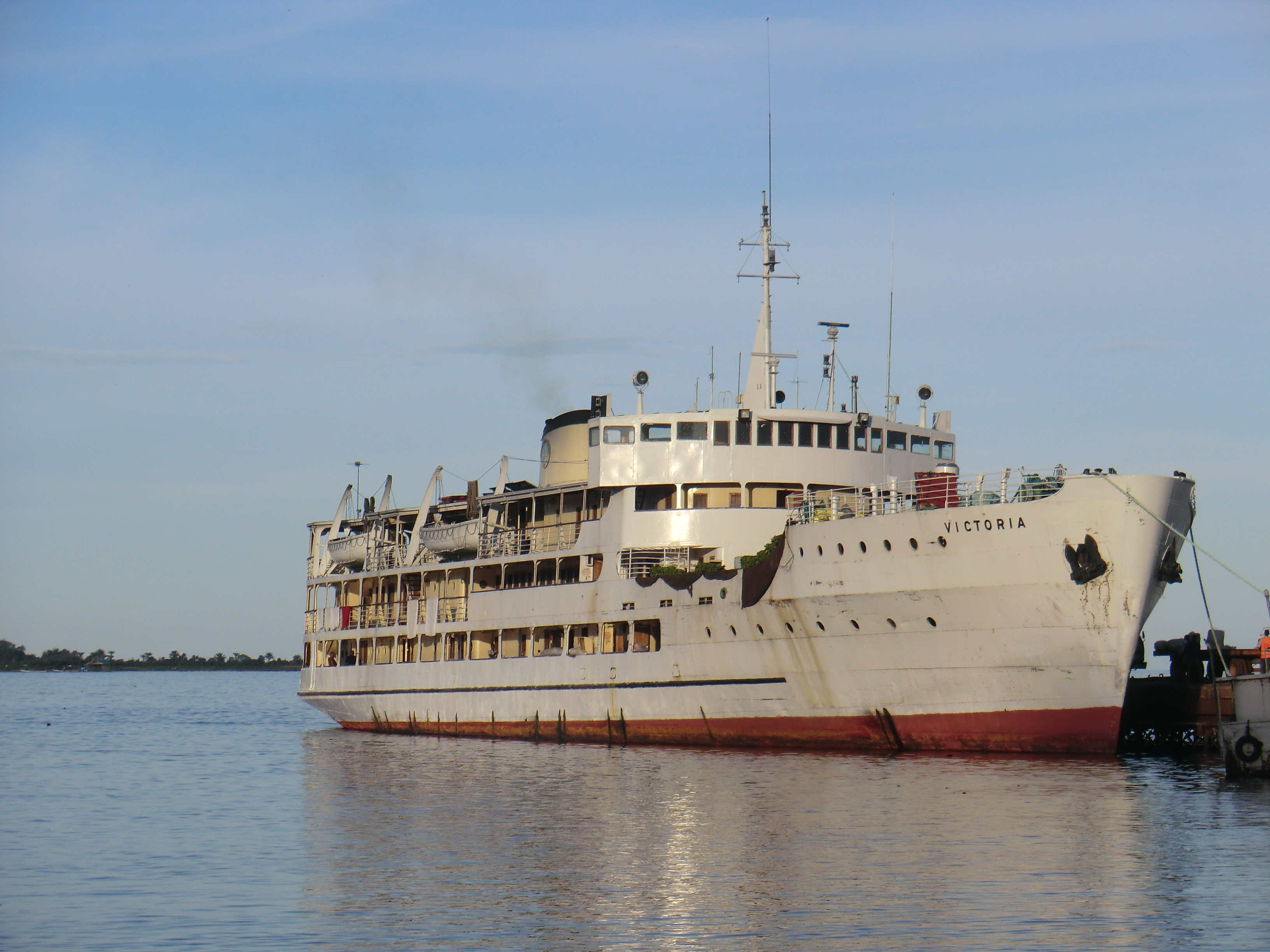
MV Victoria, the former Royal Mail Ship, anchored at Bukoba Port.

Ship	Built	Rehabilitated	Speed (kn)	Passengers	Cargo (t)	Lake served
MV Butiama	1980	–	12.5	200	100	Victoria
MV Clarias	1961	1993	10.5	290	10	Victoria
MV Iringa	1974	1988	10	139	5	Nyasa
MV Liemba	1913	1993	10.5	600	200	Tanganyika
ML Maindi	1938	1972	8	–	120	Victoria
MV Mwongozo	1982	1992	11	800	80	Tanganyika
MT Nyangumi	1958	1995	9	–	350	Victoria
MT Sangara	1981	–	9	–	350	Tanganyika
MV Serengeti	1988	–	9.5	593	350	Victoria
MV Songea	1974	1994	10	212	40	Nyasa
MV Umoja	1964	–	11	–	1,200	Victoria
MT Ukerewe	1938	1972	–	–	740	Victoria
MV Victoria	1960	1989	12.5	1,200	200	Victoria
ML Wimbi	1938	1972	8	–	120	Victoria

=== Future ===
In 2014, Transport Minister Harrison Mwakyembe informed the Parliament that the government's plan to purchase three new vessels from Denmark had been delayed until June 2015 because of a 163 per cent increase in costs. The acquisition will cost US$74.9 million and construction of the vessels will take three years. He also stated that discussions with the South Korean government are on-going to procure three vessels.

== Accidents and incidents ==
- In February 2013, fire broke out on the MV Victoria whilst docked at Mwanza Port. It is believed that it was due to the welding works going on in one of the lower deck rooms and sparks of fire then passed on to the adjacent storage compartment. The situation was under control within two hours. The Surface and Marine Transport Regulatory Authority (SUMATRA) blamed the management for professional negligence.
- On 10 October 2014, MV Victoria experienced an engine failure midway on its journey from Bukoba to Mwanza.

== Gallery ==
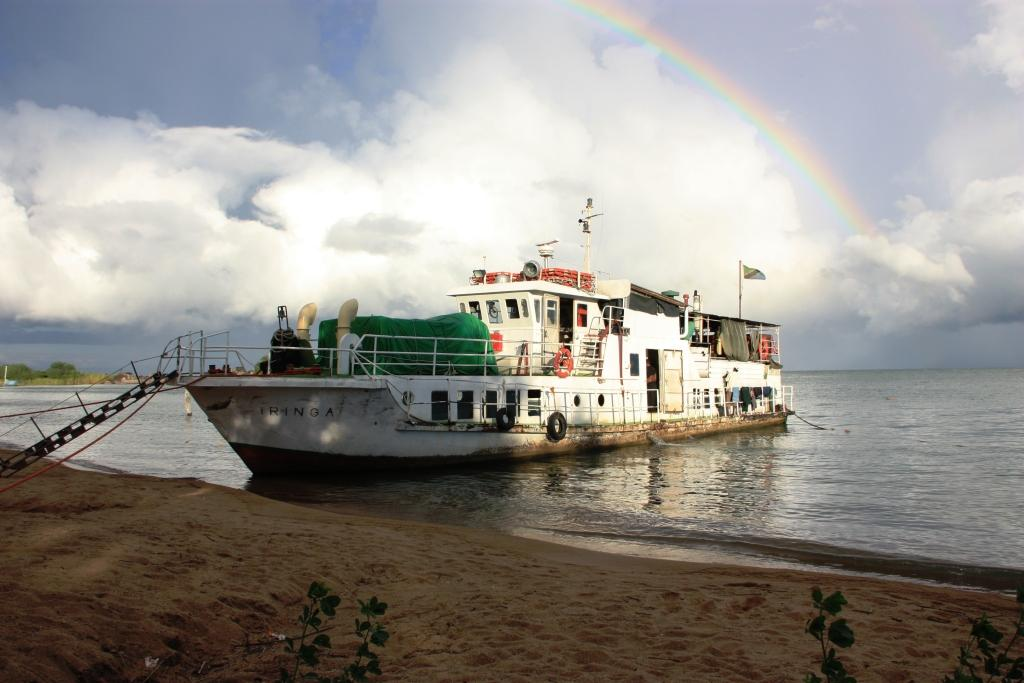
MV Iringa

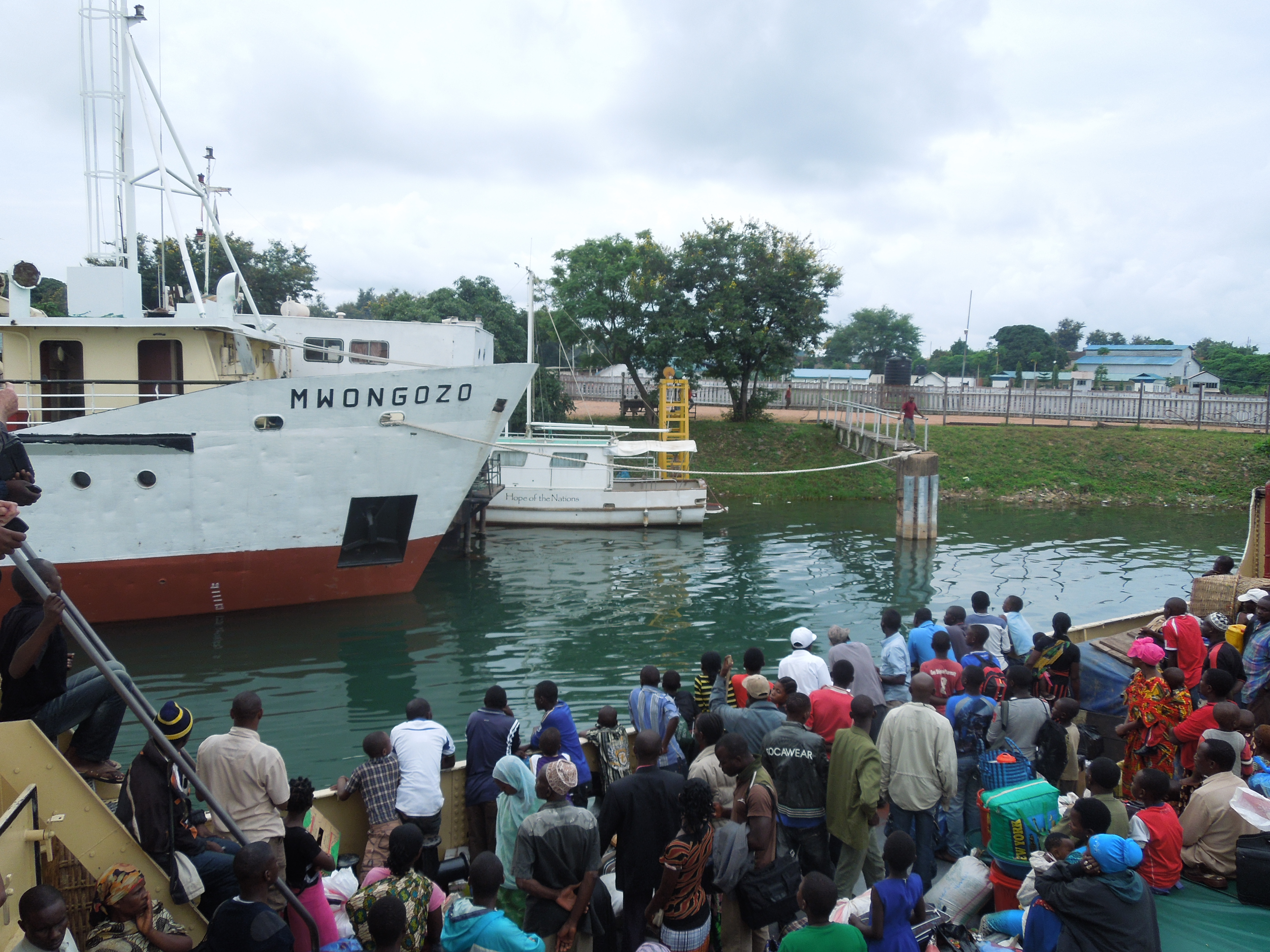
MV Mwongozo

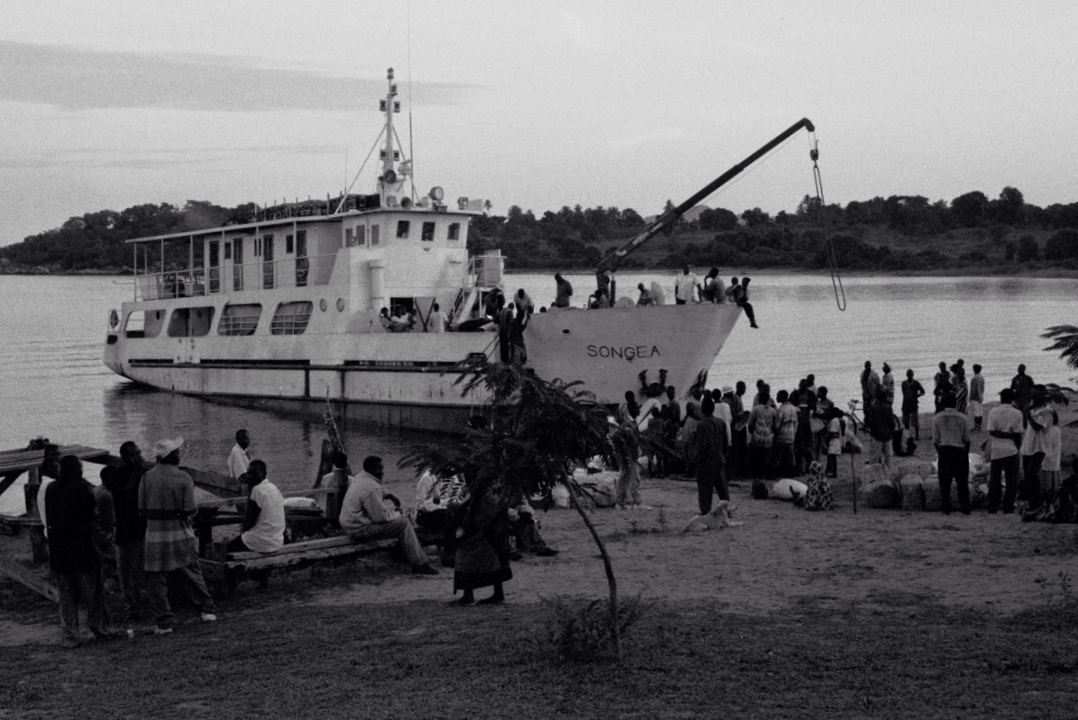
MV Songea

== See also ==
- Lake Victoria ferries
