= UR MS class =

Uganda Railway MS class Kenya-Uganda Railway MS (EE) class East African Railways 10 class
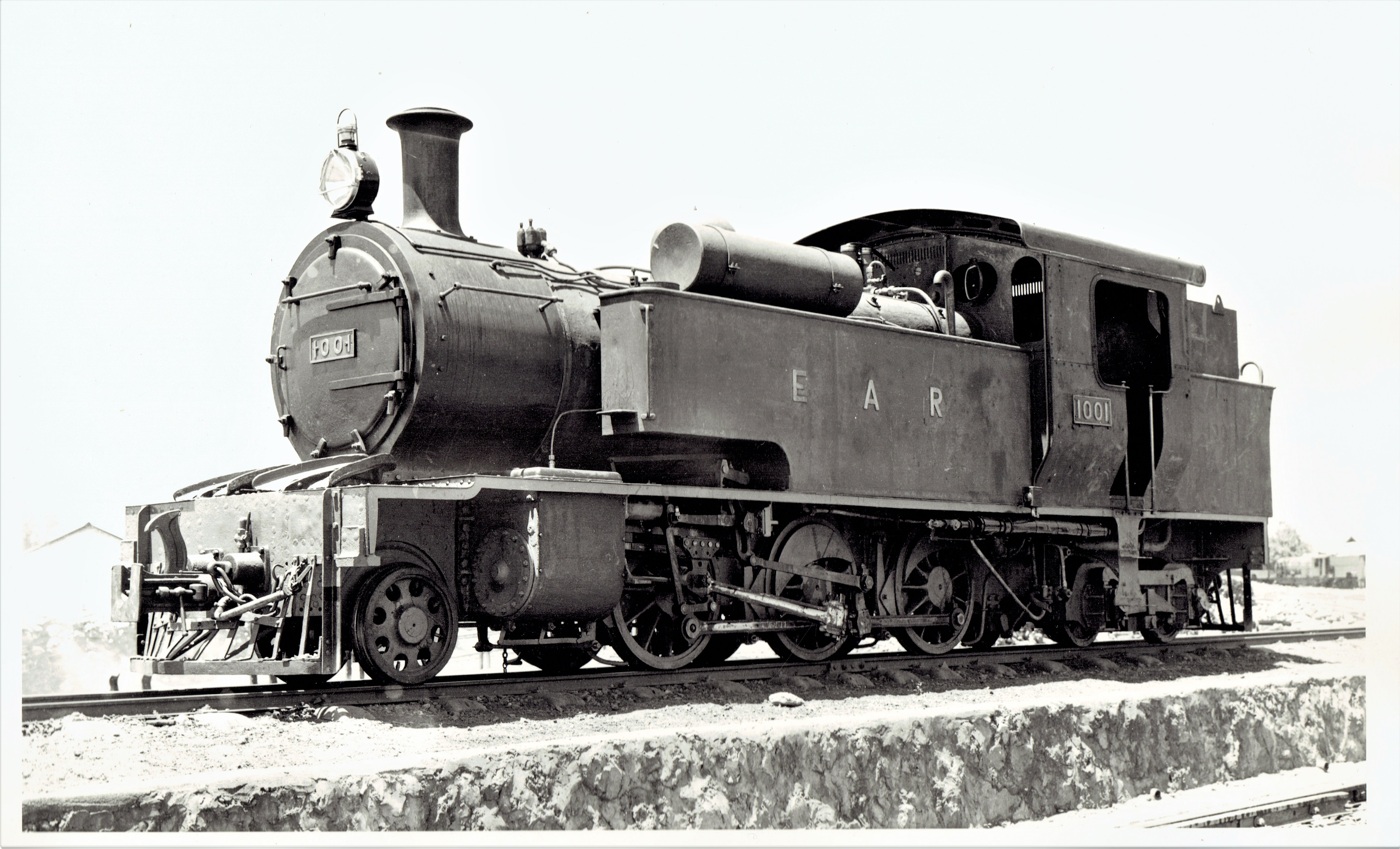
- East African Railways publicity photograph of no. 1001, c. 1953
Type and origin
- Power type: Steam
- Builder: Nasmyth, Wilson and Company
- Build date: 1913–14
- Total produced: 8
Specifications
- Configuration
  - Whyte: 2-6-4T
- Gauge: 1,000 mm (3 ft 3 3/8 in)
Career
- Operators: Uganda Railway (UR); → Kenya-Uganda Railway (KUR); → East African Railways (EAR)
- Class: UR: MS class; KUR: MS class / EE class; EAR: 10 class
- Numbers: UR: 1009–1013, 1041–1043; KUR: 61–68 / 91–98 / 391–398; EAR: 1001–1008

The UR MS class, known later as the KUR MS class, later still as the KUR EE class, and finally as the EAR 10 class, was a class of 1,000 mm (3 ft 3 3/8 in) gauge 2-6-4T steam locomotives built by Nasmyth, Wilson and Company in Patricroft, Salford, England, for the Uganda Railway (UR).

== Service history ==
The eight members of the class entered service on the UR as its MS class in 1913–14. The UR acquired them to carry out shunting and light traffic duties on its branch lines. All members of the class continued in service after the UR was renamed the Kenya-Uganda Railway (KUR) in 1926, and were reclassified in 1929 as the KUR EE class.

In 1949, they became part of the fleet of the KUR's successor, the East African Railways (EAR). The EAR later reclassified them as its 10 class; they were withdrawn in the 1960s.

== Preservation ==
One member of the class, no. 1003, has been preserved, and is on static display at Jamhuri Park in Nairobi.

== See also ==
- Rail transport in Kenya
- Rail transport in Uganda
