= MV Uhuru =

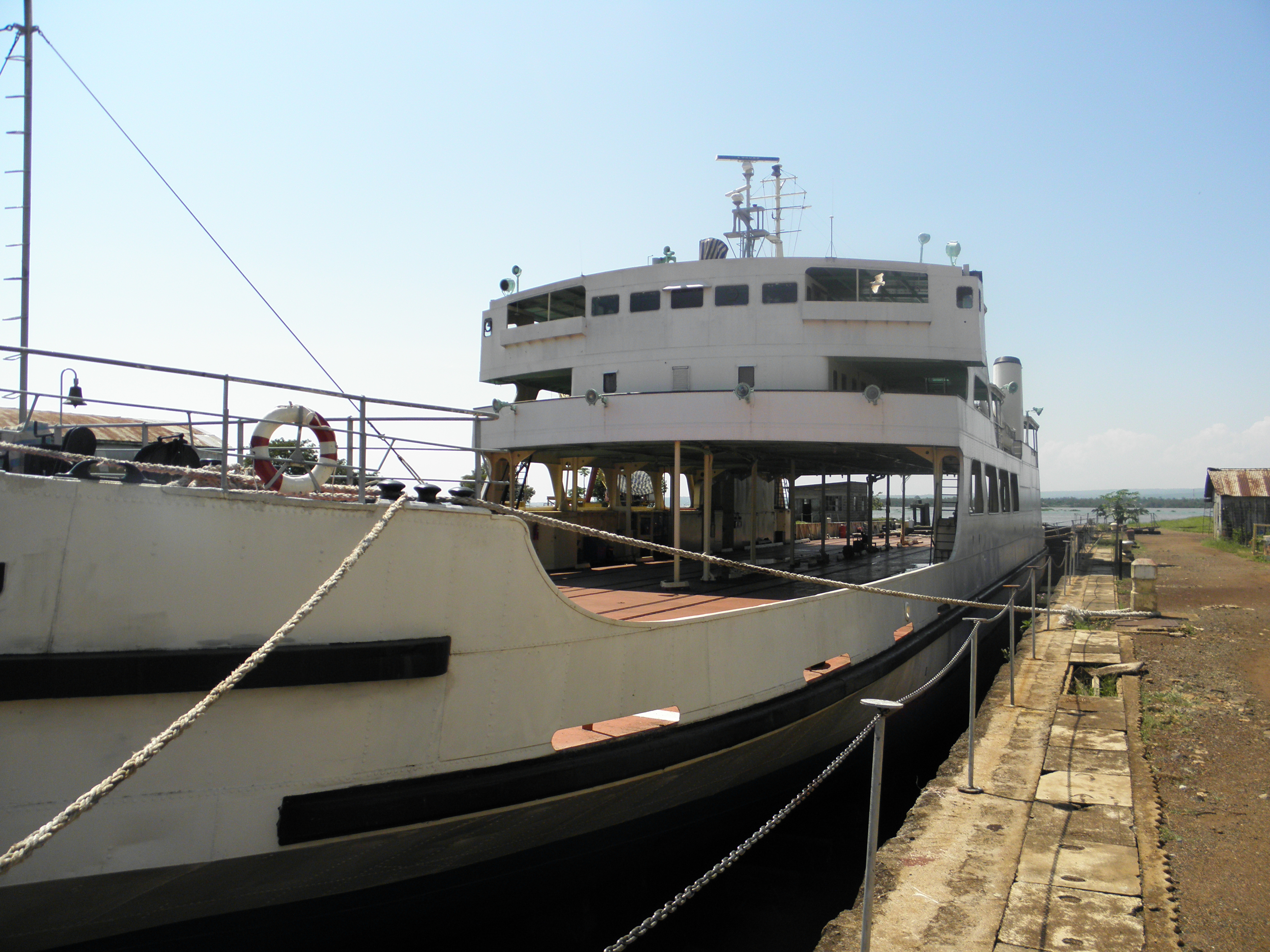
- MV Uhuru anchored at Kisumu Docks

History
- Name: MV Uhuru
- Port of registry: (Kenya) Kisumu
- Route: on Lake Victoria between Jinja, Mwanza, Musoma & Kisumu
- Builder: Yarrow Shipbuilders
- Yard number: 2243
- Launched: 1965
- In service: 17 October 1966

General characteristics
- Type: train ferry
- Tonnage: 1,180
- Length: over 300 ft (91 m)
- Draught: 8 ft 8 in (2.64 m)
- Installed power: 800 hp (600 kW) V-8 diesel
- Propulsion: screw

MV Uhuru is a Lake Victoria ferry in East Africa. She is a Kenya Railways Corporation train ferry that operated between Jinja, Mwanza, Musoma and Kisumu. Uhuru means "freedom" in Swahili.

Uhuru and her sister ship MV Umoja were built in 1965 by Yarrow Shipbuilders in Scotstoun, Glasgow, Scotland, and entered service in 1966. At over 300 ft (91 m), they were the longest vessels on any of the East African lakes.

The two vessels were owned and operated by the East African Railways and Harbours Corporation (EARH) until 1977, when EARH was divided between Kenya, Tanzania and Uganda. Uhuru was transferred to the new Kenya Railways Corporation and Umoja was transferred to the new Tanzania Railways Corporation.

Uhuru was suspended from service in 2007 after grounding the previous year.

The ferry returned to service in 2019, after overhaul.
