= Serengeti (disambiguation) =

The Serengeti is a geographical region in Tanzania.

Serengeti may also refer to:

== Places ==
- Serengeti District, one of the five districts in the Mara Region of Tanzania
- Serengeti National Park, a national park in Serengeti region
- Serengeti Park, Europe's largest safari park, in Lower Saxony, Germany

== Other uses ==
- Serengeti (film) or Serengeti Shall Not Die, a 1959 German documentary by Bernhard Grzimek
- Serengeti (rapper), American hip-hop artist
- "Serengeti" (song), by Infernal, 2000
- Serengeti (sunglasses brand), a designer brand of sunglasses
- Serengeti cat, a breed of cat
- MV Serengeti, a Tanzanian passenger and cargo ship on Lake Victoria
- Serengeti, a 2019 television documentary narrated by Lupita Nyong'o
- Serengeti Energy Limited, a renewable energy independent power producer based in Nairobi, Kenya focusing on sub-Saharan Africa.
