= MV Umoja =

Lake Victoria ferry in East Africa

History
- Name: MV Umoja
- Owner: E.A.R.& H.
- Port of registry: Kisumu
- Route: on Lake Victoria between Jinja, Mwanza, Musoma & Kisumu
- Builder: Yarrow Shipbuilders
- Yard number: 2242
- Launched: 1965
- In service: 1966
- Fate: Transferred to Tanzania

History

Tanzania
- Name: MV Umoja
- Operator: Marine Services Company
- Port of registry: Mwanza
- Acquired: 1977
- Status: in service

General characteristics
- Type: train ferry
- Tonnage: 1,180, 1,599 GRT
- Length: 91.75 m (301 ft)
- Beam: 16.5 m (54.1 ft)
- Draught: 3.96 m (13 ft)
- Installed power: 1,480 hp (1,100 kW) V-8 diesel
- Propulsion: screw

MV Umoja is a Lake Victoria ferry in East Africa. She is a train ferry that Marine Services Company of Mwanza, Tanzania operates between Jinja, Mwanza, Musoma and Kisumu. Umoja means "unity" in Swahili. She has been involved in several accidents and is featured in a book by Paul Theroux.

== History ==
Umoja and her sister ship MV Uhuru were built in 1965 by Yarrow Shipbuilders in Scotstoun, Glasgow, Scotland, and entered service in 1966. At over 300 ft (91 m), they were the longest vessels on any of the East African lakes.

The two vessels were owned and operated by the East African Railways and Harbours Corporation (EARH) until 1977, when EARH was divided between Kenya, Tanzania and Uganda. Uhuru was transferred to the new Kenya Railways Corporation and Umoja was transferred to the new Tanzania Railways Corporation.

Umoja struck rocks in 1990, 1996, and 2002. The 2002 accident caused $160,000 worth of damage.

In 1997 TRC's inland shipping division became a separate company, the Marine Services Company Ltd.

In his book Dark Star Safari, Paul Theroux gives an account of a journey on Lake Victoria aboard Umoja, detailing the hazards from out-of-date charts and emphasising the friendliness and competence of the crew.
