= Sinking of MV Nyerere =

2018 ferry accident in Tanzania

MV Nyerere
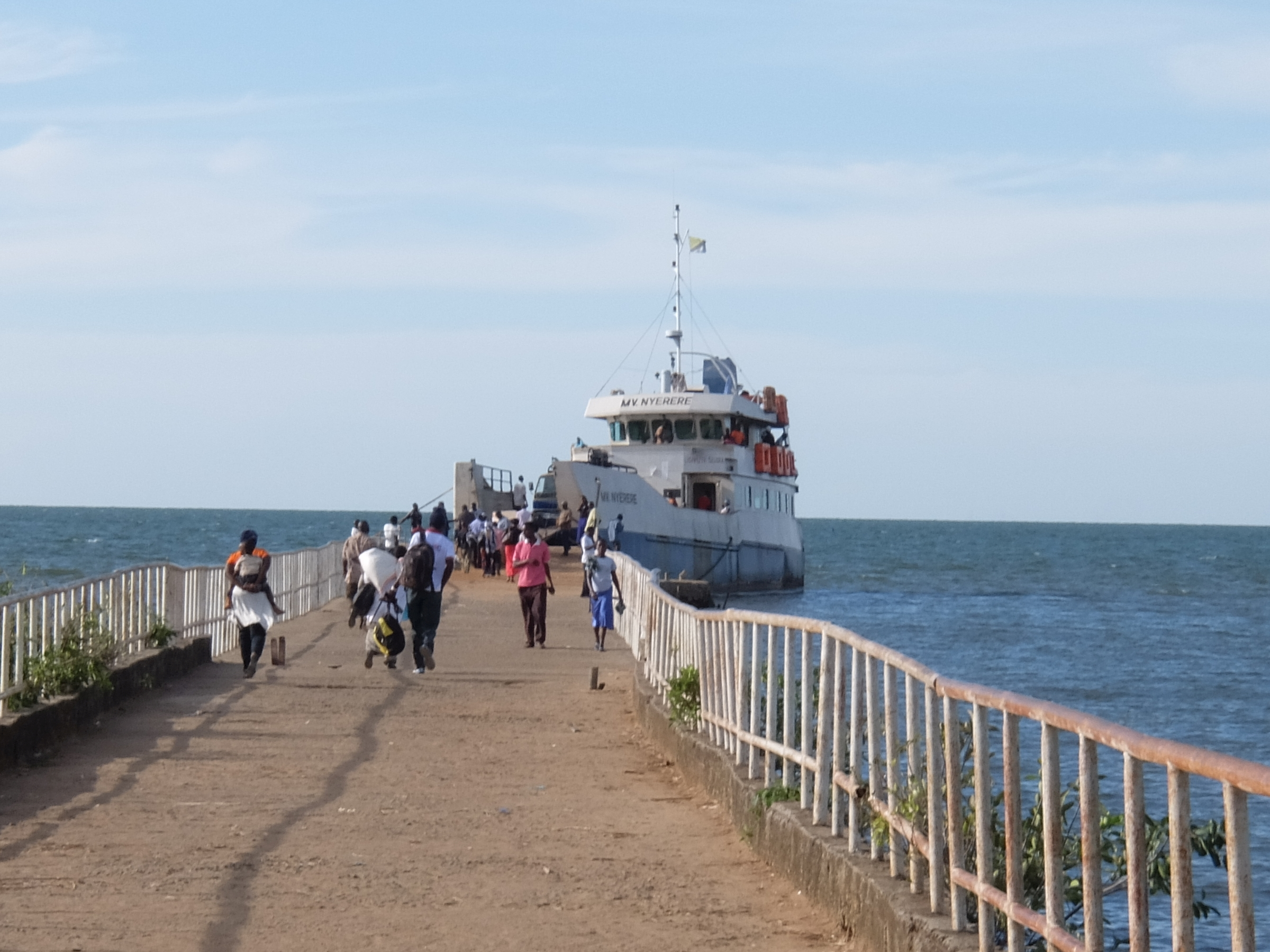
- MV Nyerere at the dock in Bugolora, Ukerewe Island in October 2015

History

Tanzania
- Name: MV Nyerere
- Namesake: Julius Nyerere
- Owner: Tanzania
- Operator: Tanzanian Electrical, Mechanical and Services Agency
- Route: Ukerewe Island to Ukara Island
- Builder: Songoro Marine Transport Ltd
- Cost: US$ 86,800
- Completed: 2004
- In service: 2004
- Out of service: 2018
- Status: recovered, onshore

General characteristics
- Type: Ro-Pax ferry
- Tonnage: 25 tonnes
- Ramps: 1
- Installed power: 2 diesel engines at 161 kW each
- Capacity: 100 passengers, 3 cars

Capsizing of MV Nyerere
- Site of sinking on a map of Tanzania
- Date: 20 September 2018; 8 years ago
- Location: Lake Victoria near Ukara Island, Tanzania; 01°52′38″S 33°01′17″E
- Cause: overloading + sharp turn
- Outcome: capsizing
- Deaths: 228

MV Nyerere was a Tanzanian ferry that capsized on 20 September 2018 while travelling between the islands of Ukerewe and Ukara on Lake Victoria. The Tanzanian government have declared that 228 people died as a result of the capsizing while 41 could be rescued. The capsized ferry was successfully righted, retrieved and unloaded more than one week after the disaster.

More than 400 children lost their parents or their guardians through the disaster.

== Vessel ==
The ship's owners and operators, Tanzanian Electrical, Mechanical and Services Agency (TEMESA), reported that the ferry had a capacity of 100 passengers, 25 tonnes of cargo and three cars and made her maiden journey in 2004. The organization also denied that Nyerere had mechanical problems as it had undergone heavy maintenance in the past months, including work on its two engines.

== Incident ==
=== Capsizing ===
The ferry was running its route from Bugolora on Ukerewe Island to Bwisya on Ukara Island on 20 September 2018 with passengers and a cargo of maize, bananas, and cement as well as a tractor. It went down in the afternoon, 50 metres (160 ft) from the dock of its intended destination in the Ukerewe District.

Two survivors of the wreck, Ochori Burana and Ruben Mpande, said the man steering the vessel, who had been speaking on a mobile telephone, made a sharp turn after realising he was preparing to dock on the wrong side of the ship. Burana told state broadcaster TBC1, "People were telling him to stop his telephone conversation and focus on the wheel. As we approached the Ukara dock we saw that he was going on the left of the dock while the disembarking area is in the right side. He suddenly made a sharp turn." Mpande added, "After the sharp turn the vessel ducked to one side throwing out people and cargo and when it pivoted to the other it went down with everyone else in it. I jumped on the water and swam to the shores."

The President of Tanzania, John Magufuli, made an address in which he said that the man piloting the vessel was untrained and the real captain was not on board the ship. However, an eyewitness on shore told France24 reporter Emmanuel Makundi that "as the ferry was approaching the shore, many people tried to reach the gate and that led a car that was onboard the ferry to tipple [sic] over. That led the ferry to list on one side, causing the accident." Another survivor, Jennifer Idhoze, "said the ferry had capsized because it was overloaded."

=== Passengers ===
Originally, officials believed that the ferry may have been carrying more than 400 passengers, approximately four times the reported maximum capacity of the vessel. The precise number of passengers is unknown as the passenger recording equipment was lost during the incident. The official responsible for dispensing the tickets drowned, and the machine that recorded the number of passengers was lost in the wreckage. Conflicting initial estimates indicated the ferry was carrying considerably more than 300 people on board, with some reports purporting a figure over 400. The police and government confirmed that 37 people had been rescued in the direct aftermath and that rescue operations were suspended until the next day. The next day, in the course of a press conference regarding the incident, President Magufuli announced a death toll of 131, with some forty individuals having been brought ashore to safety. As part of rescue operations, police and army divers have been sent to the wreckage to search for the scores of people still missing. Engineer Augustine Charahani was found alive in an air pocket in the engine room more than 40 hours after the accident, after rescuers heard sounds. On 23 September 2018, three days after the capsizing, Magufuli further revised the death toll upwards to 224, and reaffirmed his earlier wish for the arrest of the management, whilst simultaneously confirming the arrest of the vessel's captain.

The final numbers released by the government one week after the incident said "close to 270 passengers" were on board when the ferry capsized, of them 228 dead while 41 could be rescued.

=== Righting ===
Despite the capsizing of the ferry, it did not sink. Given the close proximity of the incident to the dock and the shallow waters around, a team of engineers from Mwanza together with the Tanzania People's Defence Force started a righting attempt to recover the ferry. On 25 September 2018, the ferry was turned on the side, with a full recovery of the ferry expected within a week after reporting. On 28 September 2018, the ferry was successfully righted, retrieved and pulled onshore on Ukara Island to be unloaded. An assessment into possibilities to repair and to reuse the ferry was started.

== Reactions and consequences ==
=== Immediate ===
Magufuli expressed his sadness and declared four days of national mourning in the aftermath of the capsizing. He subsequently ordered the arrest of the ferry's management, accusing them of gross negligence for having overloaded the vessel beyond its stated capacity of 101. Opposition politician John Mnyika accused the government of having failed to enhance ferry safety standards, and for the lackadaisical speed at which the "inadequate" rescue operation was conducted.

A team of seven members under the supervision of the former Chief of Defense Forces, General George Waitara was formed a few days after the incident to probe reasons for the capsizing of the ferry.

A special bank account was opened for donations to support the victims of the disaster and to provide some relief to all affected. With the closure of the bank account on 29 September 2018, close to US$400,000 were collected (TSh 900 million), around US$88,000 of that sum were used as condolence money for the relatives, around US$105,000 were used to pay the rescuers - and around US$210,000 were awarded to the Bwisya Health Centre on Ukara Island to build three hospital wards for women, men and children to help the residents in the area. A memorial tower was to be built on Ukara Island.

The service of MV Nyerere to Ukara Island had temporarily been taken over by the small ferry MV Ukara with a capacity of only 70 passengers and no cargo, but it was also announced, that a larger ferry, MV Sabasaba with about 300 passengers capacity was about to take over the route in the future after some repairs.

=== Medium term ===
More than 160 families went into treatment for post-traumatic stress disorder due to the loss of family members. In addition, more than 400 children, with the exact numbers unknown, became orphaned because of the tragedy. These children, in need of food, a home, education and support and psychological help in order to cope with the new situation, were given help by the Tanzanian Red Cross Society.

One surviving ferry engineer, who was caught in the capsized ferry for more than 48 hours before being rescued, returned to work as a ferry engineer two months after the incident, on the ferry MV Temesa. The survivor said that he was happy to get the chance to do so.

== See also ==
- MV Bukoba
- MV Skagit
- Sinking of MV Spice Islander I
- Sinking of Doña Paz
