= Clement Lloyd Hill =

British diplomat and politician

Sir Clement Lloyd Hill, KCB, KCMG (5 May 1845 – 9 April 1913) was a British diplomat and Conservative Party politician.

Hill was the third son of the Rev John Hill, and was a great-nephew of British Army general Rowland Hill, 1st Viscount Hill. He was educated at Marlborough College, before entering the Foreign Office in 1867 as a clerk.

He was appointed secretary to Sir Henry Bartle Frere's special mission to Zanzibar and Muscat in 1872–73, acting chargé d’affaires at Munich in 1876, private secretary to Robert Bourke, Under-Secretary of State for Foreign Affairs, in 1885–86. He was appointed Superintendent of African Protectorates under Foreign Office in 1900, and retired in 1905, when supervision of British protectorates was transferred to the Colonial Office.

Hill was returned for Shrewsbury in 1906 as a Conservative, and was re-elected twice before dying in office in 1913, aged 67.

Hill was appointed KCMG in 1887, CB in 1898, and KCB in 1905. He also received the Africa General Service Medal with the "Uganda" clasp, and was appointed to the First Class of the Order of the Brilliant Star of Zanzibar. The Uganda Railways-owned ship SS Clement Hill was named after him.
