= Kara people (Tanzania) =

Ethnic group from Mwanza Region of Tanzania

The Kara are an ethnic and linguistic group mainly based in the Ukerewe District of Mwanza Region, in the Tanzanian section of Lake Victoria (Ukara Island, Ukerewe Island, southeastern shore of the lake). In 1987, the Kara population was estimated to number 86,000.
