= MV Tegemeo =

History

Tanzania
- Name: MV Tegemeo
- Owner: Tanzanian Government
- Operator: Marine Services Company
- Route: Maisome to Kahunda
- Cost: TSh 1.88 billion
- Launched: 27 September 2014
- Status: in service

General characteristics
- Type: Ferry
- Tonnage: 85 GT
- Capacity: 200 passengers; 10 vehicles

MV Tegemeo is a ferry operating on Lake Victoria in Tanzania. Its name in the Swahili language could either mean expectation or support.

== History ==
It was officially launched by Vice President Mohamed Gharib Bilal on 27 September 2014.
