= SS Nyanza =

SS Nyanza is the name of the following ships:

- SS Nyanza (1890), stranded in Lake Erie 1919, abandoned 1920
- SS Nyanza (1897), sunk by SM UB-95 on 29 September 1918
- SS Nyanza (1907), moored at Lake Victoria.

== See also ==
- Nyanza (disambiguation)
