= SS Sybil =

A number of steamships were named Sybil, including:

- SS Sybil (1901), an African ferry
- SS Sybil, a French cargo ship that was beached in 1920
