= MV Butiama =

History

Tanzania
- Name: MV Butiama
- Namesake: Butiama town
- Operator: Marine Services Company
- Route: Mwanza to Nansio
- Acquired: 1980
- Status: In service

General characteristics
- Tonnage: 100 tonnes
- Capacity: 180 passengers

MV Butiama is a passenger and cargo vessel which is operated by the Marine Services Company of Tanzania since 1980.

== History ==
MV Butiama was built in 1980 as one of the smallest ships.

== Revamp ==
After the ship had stopped its service in 2014, the government spent TSh 4.9 billion to renovate it. In August 2020, the newly revamped Butiama returned to service after a long hiatus and started operating between Mwanza and Nansio on Ukerewe Island. It has the capacity for 180 passengers and 100 tonnes of cargo.
