= SS Nyanza (1907) =

Passenger-cargo steamer

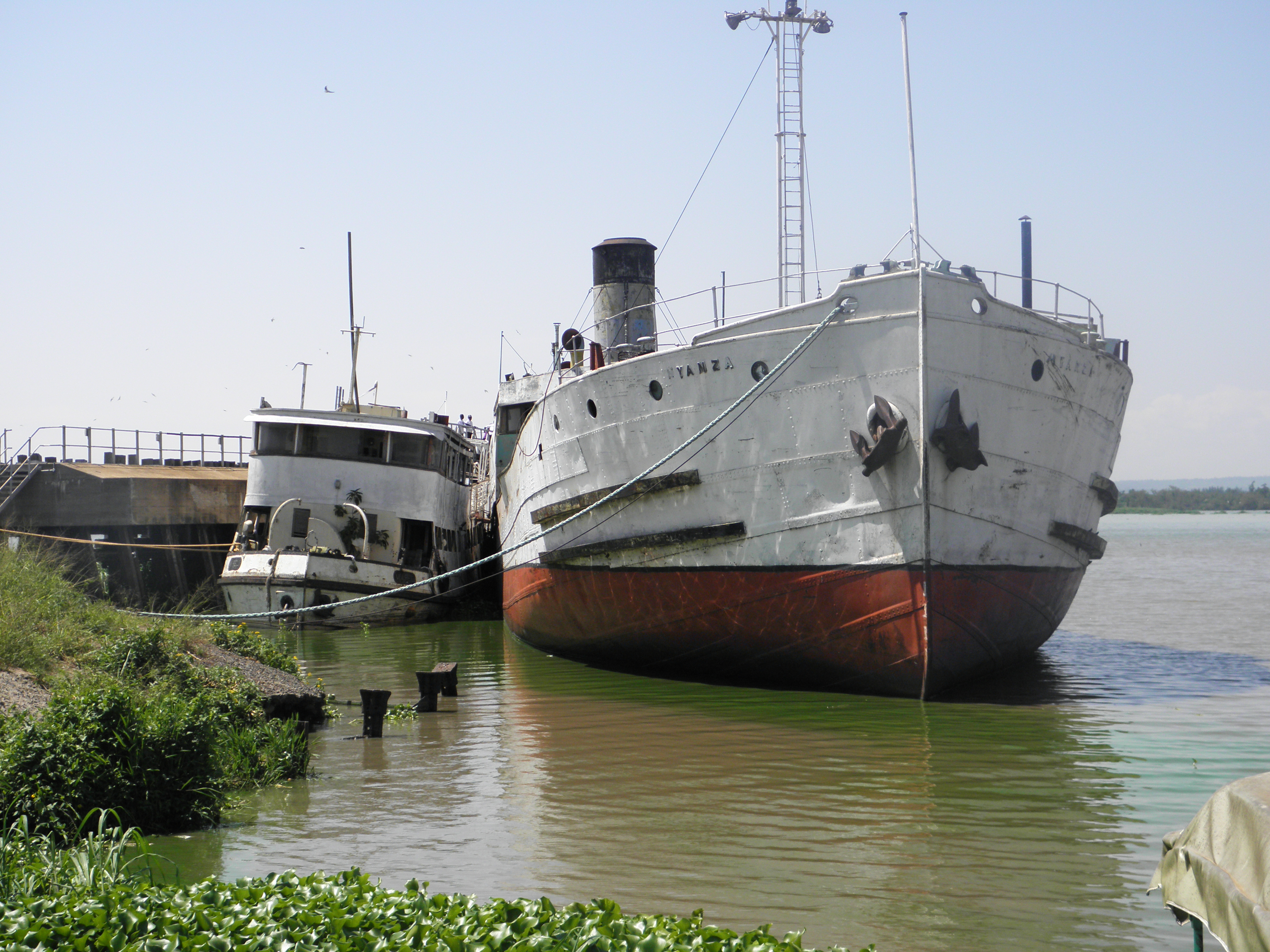
- SS Nyanza and MV Reli in Kisumu

History
- Name: SS Nyanza
- Namesake: Nyanza Province, southwest Kenya
- Operator: Uganda Railway 1907–29; Kenya and Uganda Railways and Harbours 1929–48; East African Railways and Harbours Corporation after 1948; Delship Ltd. ca. 2002
- Port of registry: (East Africa Protectorate) (Kenya) Kisumu
- Builder: Bow, McLachlan & Co, Paisley, Scotland
- Yard number: 220
- Launched: 1907
- Completed: 1907
- Maiden voyage: 1907
- In service: 1907
- Status: Abandoned

General characteristics
- Type: Passenger-cargo ship
- Tonnage: 812 GRT
- Installed power: Two 450 hp triple expansion engines supplied by Babcock & Wilcox boilers
- Propulsion: Twin-screw propellers

SS Nyanza is a disused passenger-cargo steamer on Lake Victoria in East Africa. She is one of seven Clyde-built ships called Nyanza that were launched between 1867 and 1956.

== History ==
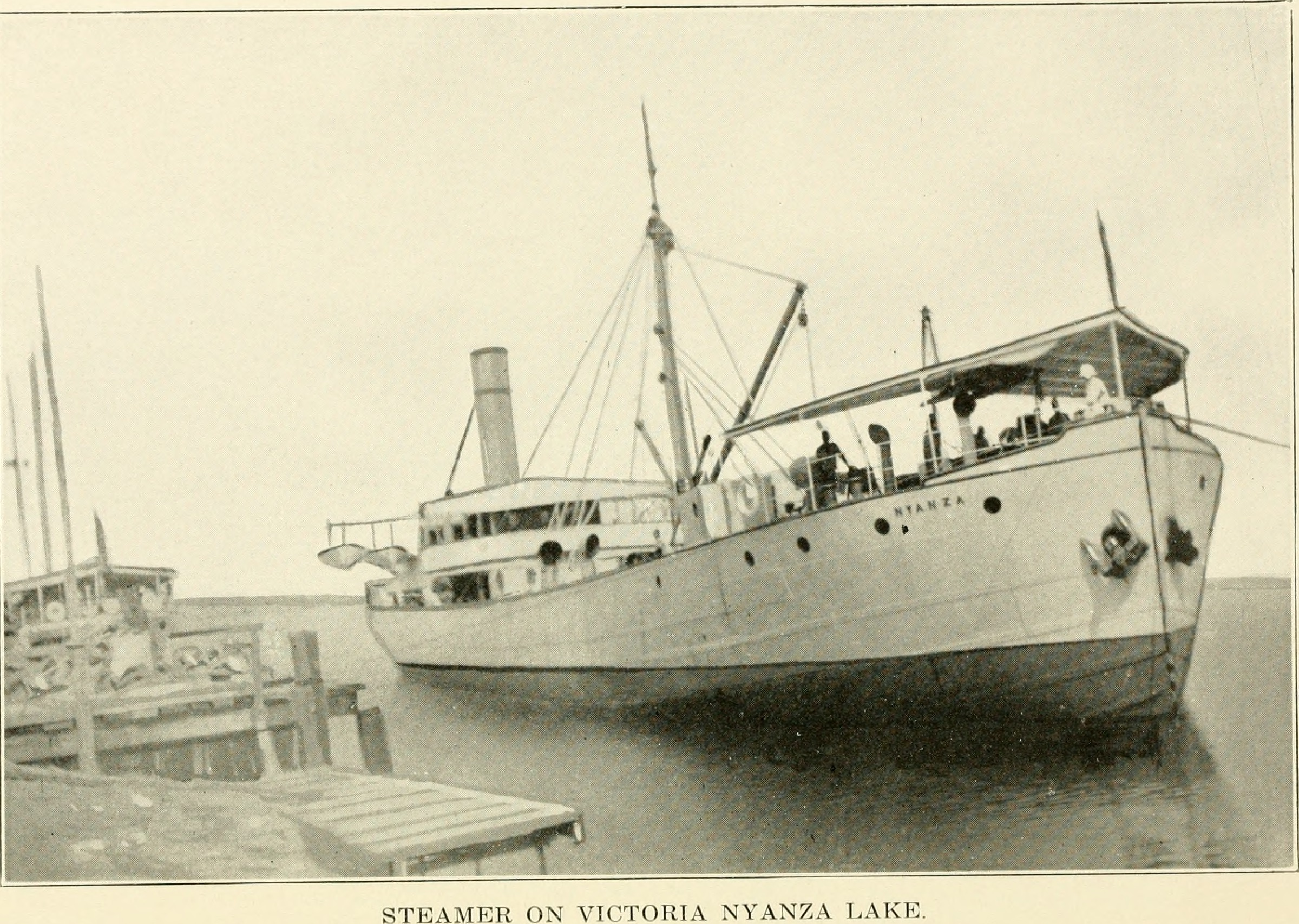
SS Nyanza in 1912

Bow, McLachlan and Company of Paisley in Renfrewshire, Scotland built SS Nyanza in 1907 for the Uganda Railway. She was a "knock-down" vessel; that is, she was constructed in the normal fashion at the shipyard in Paisley, then, after all her parts had been marked with identifying numbers, disassembled and transported by sea in kit form to Kenya for reassembly and fit-out.

Ownership of Nyanza passed from the Uganda Railway to its successors Kenya and Uganda Railways and Harbours in 1929 and the East African Railways and Harbours Corporation in 1948. In 2002 she was owned by a private company, Delship Ltd, that planned to convert her into a motor vessel. As of 2019, Nyanza was still laid up at Kisumu, along with fleetmate SS Usoga.

== SS Nomadic ==
Nyanza's boilers and triple expansion engines are of a similar size to those originally installed in the White Star Line ship SS Nomadic, which was built in 1911 as a tender to RMS Olympic and RMS Titanic. In 2008 the Nomadic Preservation Society launched an unsuccessful appeal for £200,000 to buy Nyanza's engines and boilers, ship them to the United Kingdom and install them in Nomadic. As of 2019, the engines and boilers are still intact and inside Nyanza.

== See also ==
- Lake Victoria ferries
