= Ukara Island =

Island in Ukerewe, Mwanza, Tanzania

- Location within Tanzania

Geography
- Location: Lake Victoria
- Coordinates: 01°50′23″S 33°03′05″E
- Archipelago: Ukerewean Archipelago
- Length: 12.7 km (7.89 mi)
- Width: 11.8 km (7.33 mi)

Administration
- Tanzania
- Region: Mwanza Region
- District: Ukerewe District
- Largest settlement: Nansio

Demographics
- Demonym: Ukaran
- Languages: Kara & Swahili
- Ethnic groups: Kara people

Ukara Island (Swahili: Kisiwa cha Ukara) is a freshwater island located in Lake Victoria. The island is administratively part of Ukerewe District in Mwanza Region, Tanzania. The island is located 10 kilometres (6.2 mi) north of Ukerewe Island and it is also was historically known as Bukara.

== Unique agricultural methods ==
The island is notable for its unique indigenous system of labor-intensive mixed farming, using advanced agricultural techniques, and a correspondingly high population density of the Kara people.

The Kara created distinctive agricultural methods that mostly depend on human labour, privately own all arable land, and use composted animal manure to preserve soil fertility. These elements have created a unique system of intensive grain cultivation that is essential to the way of life and culture of the Kara people.

== 2018 ferry accident ==
On 20 September 2018, the MV Nyerere capsized near the island, killing hundreds of people, while plying its route from Ukerewe Island to Ukara Island.

== See also ==
- Kara people
- List of islands of Tanzania
