= SS Usoga =

Ferry

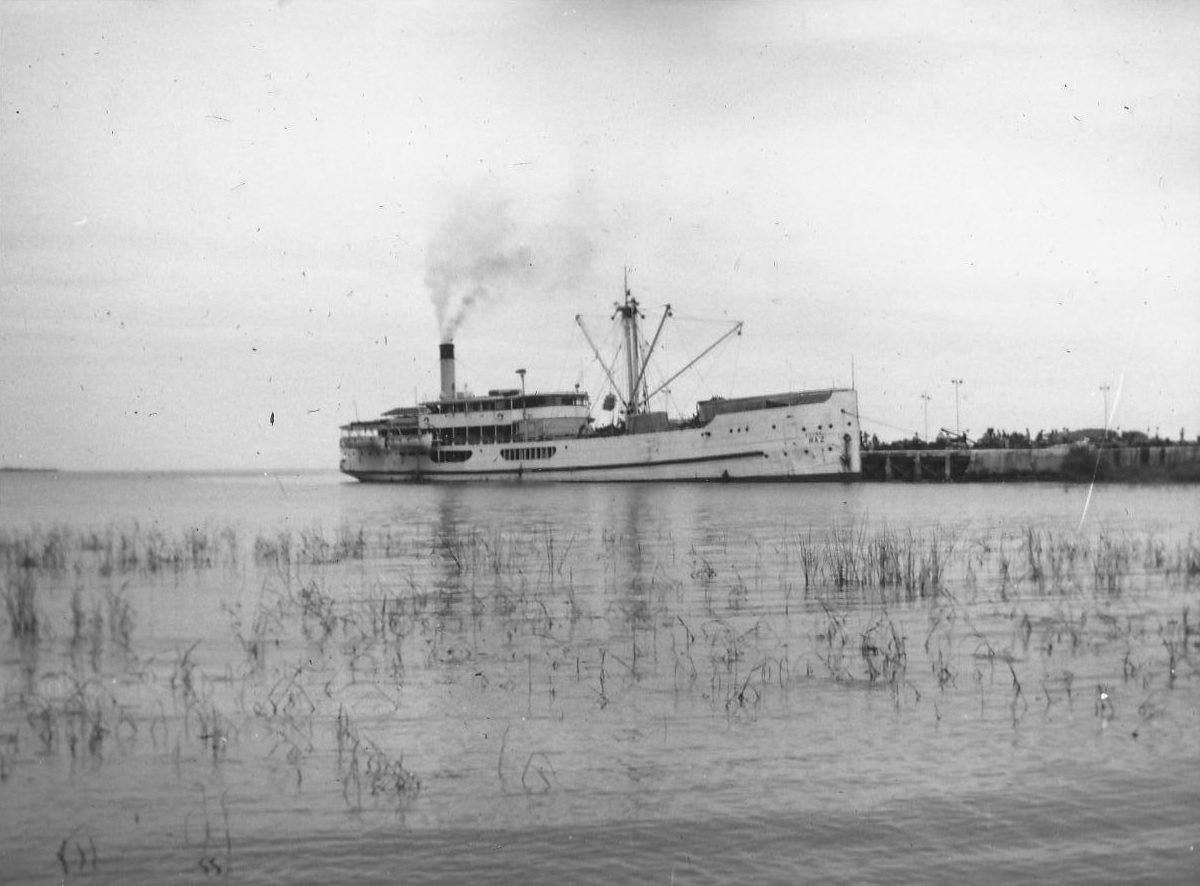
- SS Usoga loading coffee at Bukoba Port in Tanzania.

History
- Name: SS Usoga
- Namesake: The kingdom of Busoga in Uganda
- Operator: Uganda Railway 1913–29; Kenya and Uganda Railways and Harbours 1929–48; East African Railways and Harbours Corporation 1948–75
- Port of registry: (East Africa Protectorate) Kisumu
- Builder: Bow, McLachlan & Co, Paisley, Scotland
- Yard number: 284
- Launched: 1913
- In service: 1915
- Out of service: 1975
- Status: Derelict at Kisumu as of 2007

General characteristics
- Type: Troop ship, then passenger & cargo ship
- Tonnage: 800 GRT; 1,300 tons displacement
- Length: 220 ft (67 m)
- Beam: 35 ft (11 m)
- Installed power: One 400 hp triple expansion engine
- Propulsion: screw

SS Usoga is a disused cargo and passenger Lake Victoria ferry in East Africa.

== History ==
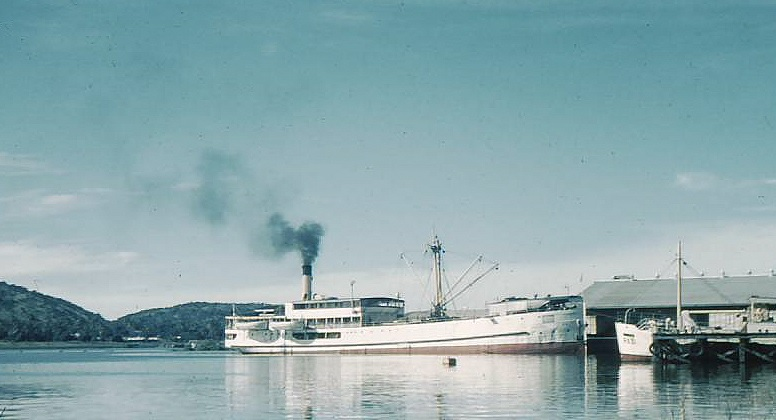
SS Usoga at Mwanza

Bow, McLachlan and Company of Paisley in Renfrewshire, Scotland built Usoga and her sister ship SS Rusinga in 1913. They were "knock down" vessels; that is, they were bolted together in the shipyard at Paisley, all the parts marked with numbers, disassembled into many hundreds of parts and transported in kit form by sea to Kenya for reassembly.

Usoga entered service on the lake in 1915 and was a troop ship during the First World War East African Campaign. After the Armistice she entered civilian service as a Lake Victoria ferry.

In 1975 the East African Railways and Harbours Corporation laid her up at the Lake Victoria port of Kisumu. In the 1990s she sank at the quayside and she was still there in 2006 and 2007, along with the slightly earlier SS Nyanza from the same fleet.
