= MV Bukoba =

Lake Victoria ferry that sank off Mwanza

Coordinates: 1°59′2″S 32°19′7″E

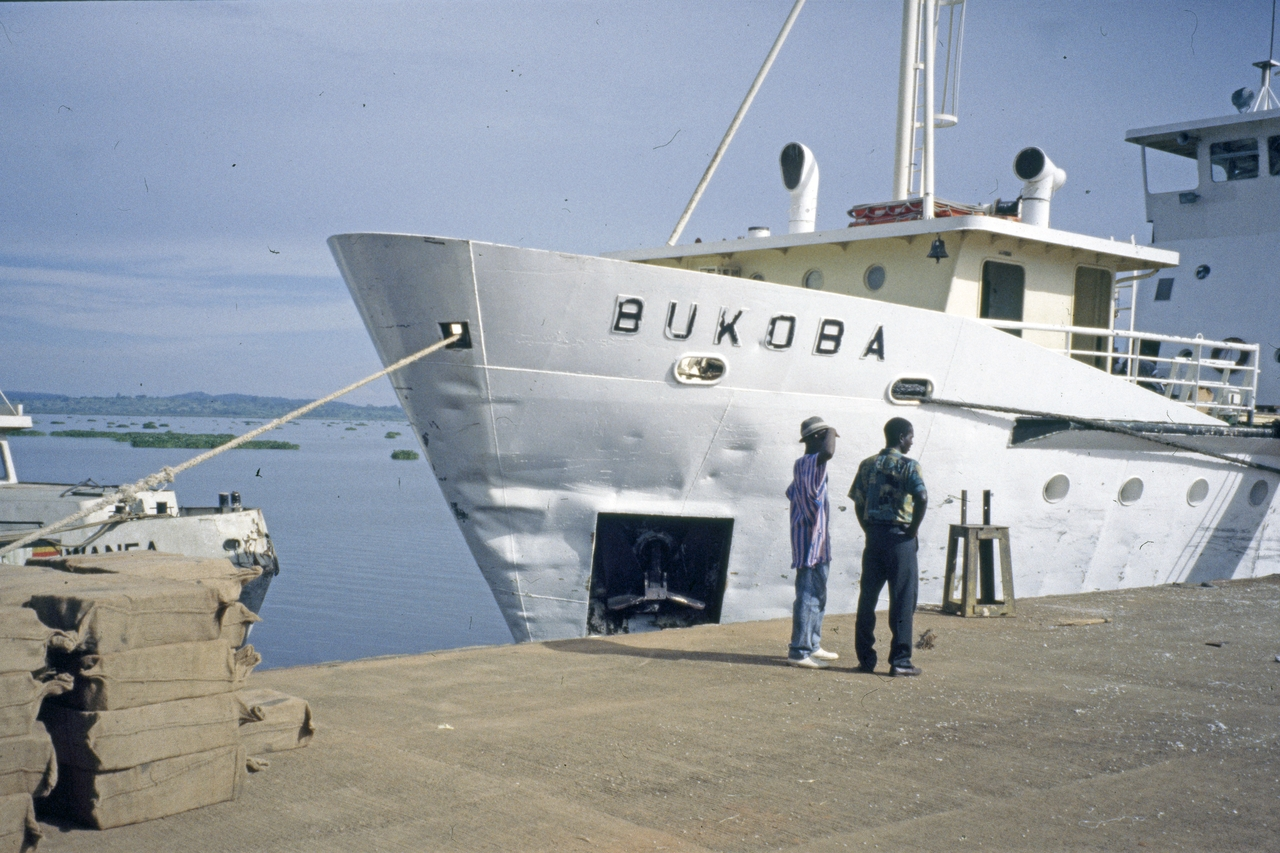
- M/V Bukoba docked at Port Bell, Uganda.

History

Tanzania
- Name: MV Bukoba
- Namesake: Bukoba town
- Owner: The government of Tanzania
- Operator: TRC Marine Division
- Route: Bukoba to Mwanza City
- Acquired: 1979
- Identification: IMO number: 7636511
- Fate: Capsized 21 May 1996

General characteristics
- Tonnage: 850 tonnes
- Capacity: 430

MV Bukoba was a Lake Victoria ferry that carried passengers and cargo along Tanzania's Lake Victoria between the Tanzanian ports of Bukoba, Kagera and Mwanza City. It also served the regular line between Port Bell, Uganda, and Mwanza, Tanzania, across Lake Victoria. MV Bukoba was built in about 1979 and had capacity for 850 tons of cargo and 430 passengers.

On 21 May 1996, MV Bukoba sank 30 nautical miles (56 km) off Mwanza city in 25 metres (14 fathoms) of water, killing up to 1,000 people. The official deaths record is 894, making it the deadliest maritime disaster in the Southern Hemisphere.

== Sinking ==
The manifest for her final voyage showed 443 passengers in her first- and second-class cabins, but her cheaper third-class accommodation had no manifest of the number of passengers loaded. Abu Ubaidah al-Banshiri, who was then second in command of al Qaeda, died in the disaster.

President Benjamin Mkapa declared three days of national mourning. Criminal charges were brought against nine Tanzania Railway Corporation officials, including the captain of the Bukoba and the manager of TRC's Marine Division.

== Causes ==
Possible causes were identified by Captain Joseph Muguthi, formerly of the Kenya Navy, and writing in the pages of the Daily Nation as a marine navigation consultant. He labelled it an accident waiting to happen, as Lake Victoria ferries disregarded safety regulations. Specifically:

1. lack of life jackets, life belts, and lifeboats;
2. lack of fire fighting equipment;
3. lack of distress signals;
4. what equipment there is, is not regularly checked;
5. overload
6. the vessels are not regularly dry docked for routine maintenance and repairs;
7. the vessels are not regularly inspected;
8. the coxswains are not licensed to navigate.

More overarchingly, Muguthi blamed the incident on governments' marine departments being staffed by civil servants and politicians who have no understanding of ships and marine decisions.

The lack of equipment and divers were partially to blame for slowness in the salvage operation. Rescue teams from South Africa, including Navy divers, were flown in to salvage the ship and retrieve bodies.

== Replacement ==
Replacement of the new ship is on construction at 89.9 bn/-, with the capacity of carrying around 1200 passengers, 20 vehicles and 400 tonnes of cargo.

== See also ==
- Lake Victoria ferries
- 2011 Zanzibar ferry sinking
- Sinking of the MV Nyerere
