= SS Rusinga =

Lake Victoria ferry in East Africa

History
- Name: SS Rusinga
- Namesake: Rusinga Island in Lake Victoria
- Operator: Uganda Railway 1913–29; Kenya and Uganda Railways and Harbours 1929–48; East African Railways and Harbours Corporation 1948–66
- Port of registry: (East Africa Protectorate) (Kenya) Kisumu
- Builder: Bow, McLachlan & Co, Paisley, Scotland
- Yard number: 283
- Launched: 1913
- In service: 1914
- Status: in service 2005

General characteristics
- Type: troop ship, then passenger & cargo ship
- Displacement: 1,300 tons
- Length: 220 ft (67 m)
- Beam: 35 ft (11 m)
- Installed power: two 400 hp triple expansion engines
- Propulsion: screw

SS Rusinga is a cargo and passenger Lake Victoria ferry in East Africa.

Bow, McLachlan and Company of Paisley in Renfrewshire, Scotland built her and her sister ship SS Usoga for the Uganda Railway in 1913. They were "knock down" vessels; that is, they were bolted together in the shipyard at Paisley, all the parts marked with numbers, disassembled into many hundreds of parts and transported in kit form by sea to Kenya for reassembly.

Rusinga entered service on the lake in 1914 and was a troop ship during the First World War East African Campaign. After the Armistice she entered civilian service as a Lake Victoria ferry.

On 30 September 1927 Rusinga was damaged by fire. She was subsequently repaired and returned to service.

In 1966 the East African Railways and Harbours Corporation withdrew her for scrap but she passed into private ownership and in 2005 was still in service.
