= MV Serengeti =

History

Tanzania
- Name: MV Serengeti
- Namesake: Serengeti
- Operator: Marine Services Company
- Completed: 1988
- Home port: Mwanza, Tanzania

General characteristics
- Type: passenger and cargo ship
- Tonnage: 975 GT
- Length: 55.6 m (182 ft)
- Beam: 11.7 m (38 ft)
- Draught: 2.76 m (9 ft 1 in)
- Ramps: bow
- Propulsion: diesel
- Capacity: 593 passengers; 350 tons cargo

MV Serengeti is a Lake Victoria passenger and cargo ship operated by the Marine Services Company of Mwanza, Tanzania.

Serengeti has a ramp in her bow for road vehicle access. In design she is a vehicular and passenger ferry, but MSC operates her in tramp trade.

She was built in 1988 for the Tanzania Railways Corporation Marine Division. In 1997 the Marine Division became a separate company, Marine Services Company Ltd.

== See also ==
- Transport in Tanzania
