= SS Clement Hill =

History
- Name: SS Clement Hill
- Namesake: Sir Clement Lloyd Hill, MP
- Operator: Uganda Railway 1907–29; Kenya and Uganda Railways and Harbours 1929–36
- Port of registry: (East Africa Protectorate) Kisumu
- Builder: Bow, McLachlan & Co, Paisley, Scotland
- Yard number: 189
- Launched: 1905
- In service: 1907
- Out of service: 1935
- Fate: scuttled 1936

General characteristics
- Type: Passenger & cargo ship
- Tonnage: 1,134 GRT
- Length: 225 ft (69 m)
- Beam: 32 ft (9.8 m)
- Installed power: 635 IHP triple expansion engine
- Propulsion: screw

SS Clement Hill was a cargo and passenger Lake Victoria ferry in East Africa.

Bow, McLachlan and Company of Paisley in Renfrewshire, Scotland built her for the Uganda Railway in 1905. She was a "knock down" vessel; that is, she was bolted together in the shipyard at Paisley, all the parts marked with numbers, disassembled into many hundreds of parts and transported in kit form by sea to Kenya for reassembly.

Clement Hill was in service on the lake from March 1907 until 1935. Kenya and Uganda Railways and Harbours then stripped her of machinery and fittings and in 1936 scuttled her at Bukakata to form a breakwater.
