= Tanzania Railways Corporation =

Tanzanian railroad company

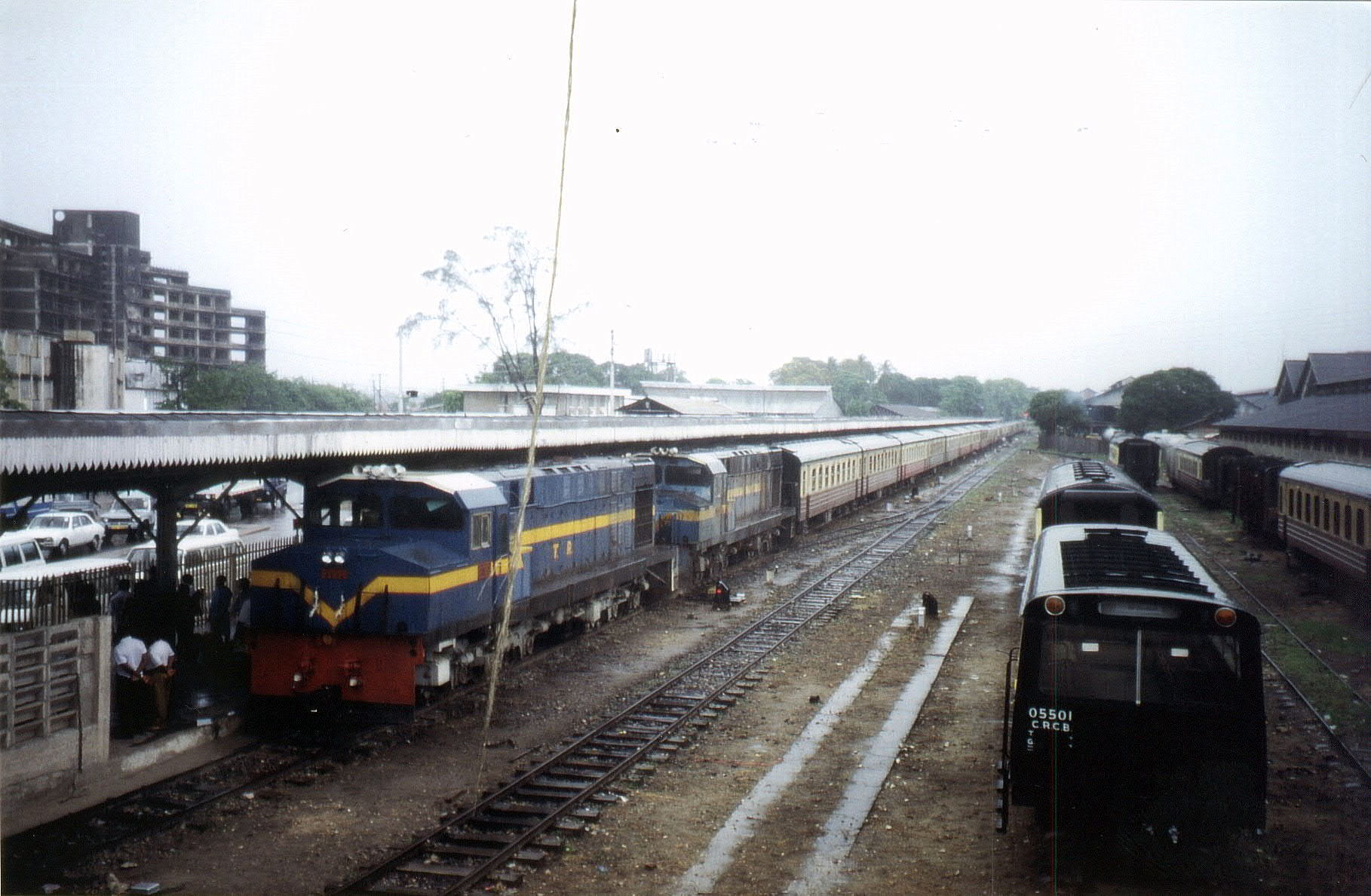
- Two diesel locomotives pull a passenger train into Dar es Salaam's main railway station.

Operation
- National railway: Tanzania

System length
- Total: 2,600 kilometres (1,600 mi)

Track gauge
- Main: 1,000 mm (3 ft 3 3/8 in)

Electrification
- Main: None

The Tanzania Railways Corporation (TRC is a state-owned enterprise that runs one of Tanzania's two main railway networks.Its headquarters are located in Mchafukoge.

When the East African Railways & Harbours Corporation was dissolved in 1977 and its assets divided between Kenya, Tanzania and Uganda, TRC was formed to take over its operations in Tanzania. In 1997 the inland shipping division became a separate company.

== MGR ==
In November 2021, TRC received the three modern locomotives (H10 series) worth Sh22 billion to strengthen their Metre-gauge railway (MGR) line, ordered from Malaysia.

== Rail network ==
TRC passenger train departing in Dodoma.

TRC's gauge is 1,000 mm (3 ft 3 3/8 in) and the length about 2,600 kilometres (1,600 mi). Two east–west lines linking the coast and the hinterland were built under colonial rule as German East Africa: the Central Line runs from Dar es Salaam to Kigoma, and the Tanga Line from Tanga to Arusha. A north-south connection, from Korogwe to Ruvu, links the two lines. The main line runs to Lake Victoria where a connection operates via Lake Victoria train ferries with the Uganda Railway and Kenya Railways. From the Tanga line a line to Kenya is disused.

Railways in Tanzania.

There is a break-of-gauge at Dar es Salaam to the Tanzania-Zambia Railway Authority (TAZARA) 1,067 mm (3 ft 6 in) line to Zambia. A second link is at Kidatu, where the TAZARA line meets the Kidatu branch.

In 2024, Tanzania inaugurated a new railway terminal in Dar es Salaam as part of its ambitious Standard Gauge Railway (SGR) project. The railway, powered by electricity, connects Dar es Salaam to Dodoma in under four hours. The 460km route is the first phase of a larger 2,560km railway designed to link Tanzania with neighboring countries such as Burundi, Rwanda, and the Democratic Republic of Congo.

== Former Marine Division ==
Pugu to City Center commuter train stopping at Buguruni Station.

TRC inherited ferry and cargo ship services on Lake Tanganyika and Lake Nyasa and some ships on Lake Victoria.

TRC introduced MV Bukoba on Lake Victoria in about 1979, MV Mwongozo on Lake Tanganyika in 1982 and passenger and cargo ship MV Serengeti on Lake Victoria in 1988.

On 21 May 1996 Bukoba sank in 25 metres (14 fathoms) of water about 30 nautical miles (56 km) off Mwanza. She had many more passengers aboard than she was certified to carry and at least 800 people were killed. After the disaster criminal charges were brought against nine TRC officials including Bukoba's master and the manager of the Marine Division.

In 1997 the Marine Division became a separate company, Marine Services Company.

== Rail accidents ==
On 24 June 2002 the Igandu train disaster killed 281 people, the second highest number of deaths in a train disaster in Africa (the highest being the Awash rail disaster).

== Privatisation and re-nationalization ==
In 2004, three consortia were shortlisted by the Parastatal Sector Reform Commission (PSRC) to operate passenger and freight trains on a concession basis for 25 years. They were the Franco-South African Great Lakes Railway Company consortium of Bolloré, Comazar, Caspian and FirstRand, a NLPI/Spoornet consortium and Rites. In September 2007, the contract was awarded to Rites. The concession agreement was signed on 3 September 2007, to take effect on 1 October 2007. The railway was to be run as Tanzania Railways Limited, with the government owning a 49% stake.

There were moves to abandon the contract due, in part, to the fact that the Indian investor failed to pay over $6 million in concession fees to the Tanzania government in 2008. Rites countered noting that the contract misled it by indicating that the Railway Assets Holding Company (Rahco) was in possession of 92 working locomotives when only 55 existed. In 2010, the government terminated the contract and resumed control.

== See also ==
- Tanzania Standard Gauge Railway
- East African Railway Master Plan
- Central Line (Tanzania)
- Rail transport in Tanzania
- TAZARA
- Transport in Tanzania
