= SS William Mackinnon =

History
- Name: SS William Mackinnon
- Namesake: Sir William Mackinnon, Bart.
- Owner: Imperial British East Africa Company 1890–94; Uganda Railway 1895–1929
- Operator: Uganda Railway 1901–29
- Port of registry: (East Africa Protectorate) Kisumu
- Builder: Bow, McLachlan & Co, Paisley, Scotland
- Laid down: 1890
- Launched: 1900
- Completed: 1901
- Fate: scuttled 1929

General characteristics
- Type: Protectorate & general purpose
- Tonnage: 110 GRT
- Length: 70 ft (21 m)
- Beam: 16 ft (4.9 m)
- Installed power: 2 triple expansion engines
- Propulsion: twin screw

SS William Mackinnon was a steamboat on Lake Victoria in East Africa. She was named after Sir William Mackinnon, founder of the Imperial British East Africa Company (IBEAC).

Bow, McLachlan and Company of Paisley in Renfrewshire, Scotland built her in 1890 for the IBEAC. She was a "knock down" vessel; that is, she was bolted together in the shipyard at Paisley, all the parts marked with numbers, disassembled into many hundreds of parts and transported in kit form by sea to Kenya for reassembly. However, once the kit reached the port of Mombasa there was a delay and it remained there in storage until 1895, when ownership of the kit passed to the newly founded Uganda Railway. Construction of the railway westwards from Mombasa began in 1896. The kit was brought out of storage and taken to Kisumu on the shore of Lake Victoria, where assembly began in 1898. William Mackinnon was launched in 1900 and completed in 1901, the same year as the Uganda Railway branch to Kisumu was completed.

In the First World War William Mackinnon was armed as a gunboat. In 1929 she reached the end of her working life. She was withdrawn from service, taken out into deep water and scuttled.

Additional History by Wycliffe Olang' Okech. How the steamboat's pieces were moved from Mombasa to Kisumu is probably very interesting. The engineers cut the ship into 3000 loads with most not exceeding 27 kg which were transported by humans walking on foot for a distance of approx 933 km, carrying pieces of a 70- tonne cargo through the man eaters of Tsavo, the Nyika plains teeming with wild animals and native warriors. Most of the cargo got lost along the way and the engineers had to go back along the route to try find them. The arrival of two engineers one Mr McMillan and Mr Brownlee helped Mr. Richard Grant with his about 200 porters to trace the missing pieces, mostly dropped by tired or dead porters along the way. At some point, Richard left to fetch the missing pieces in Nandi escarpment. When he returned, he found McMillan had died and Brownlee was down with malaria. A new engineer one Mr. Barton Wright was the final person to deliver the cargo to the lake in 1900. the SS William Mackinnon was loved and almost hated in equal measure. The haters nicknamed it "The Emetic", (a reference perhaps to its tendency to make its passengers vomit?)
