= East African Railways and Harbours Corporation =

East African railway company (1948–1977)

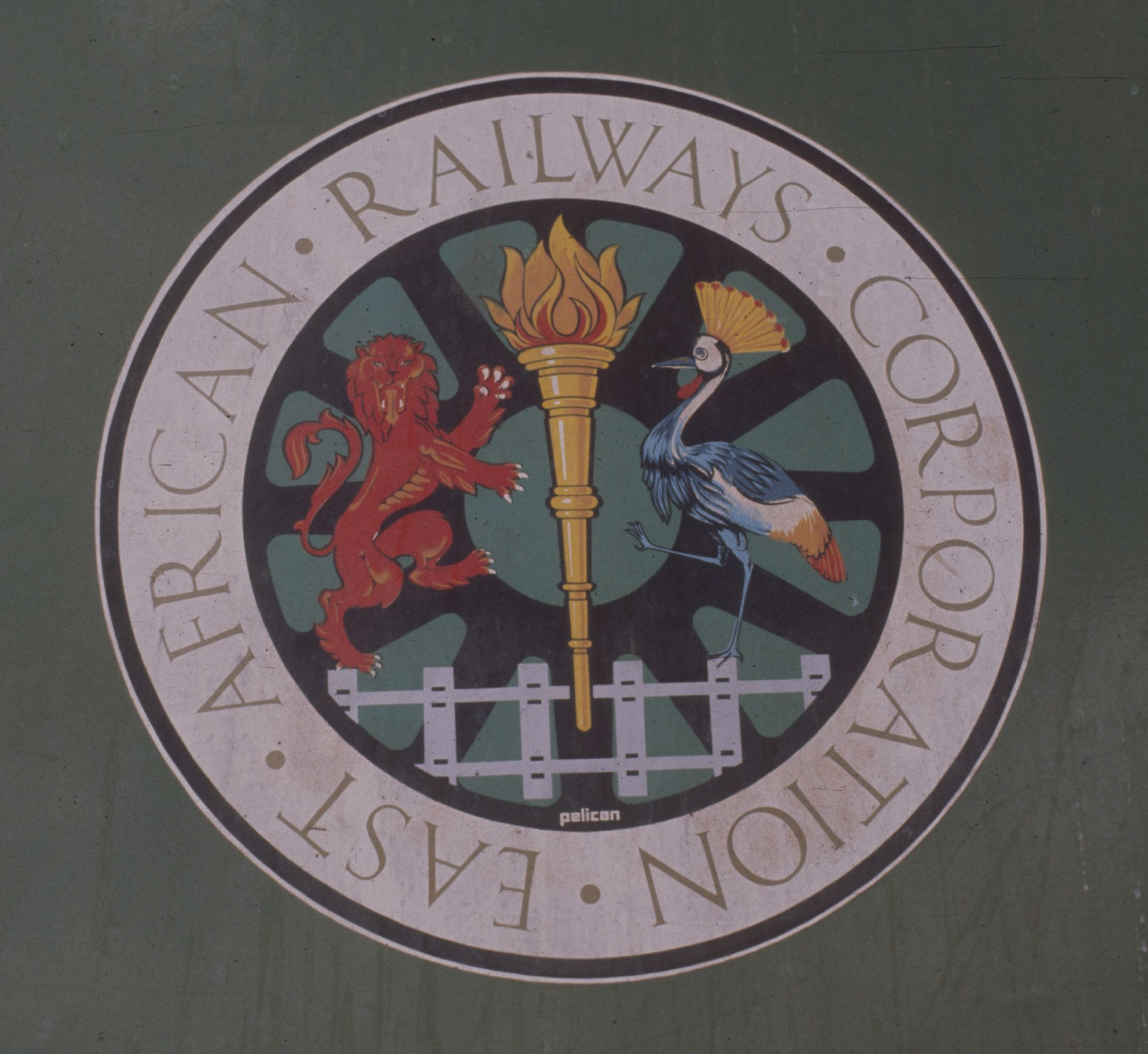
- Type: Government-owned corporation
- Predecessor: Kenya and Uganda Railways and Harbours; Tanganyika Railway
- Founded: 1948
- Defunct: 1977
- Fate: Split into national companies
- Successor: Kenya Railways Corporation; Uganda Railways Corporation; Tanzania Railways Corporation

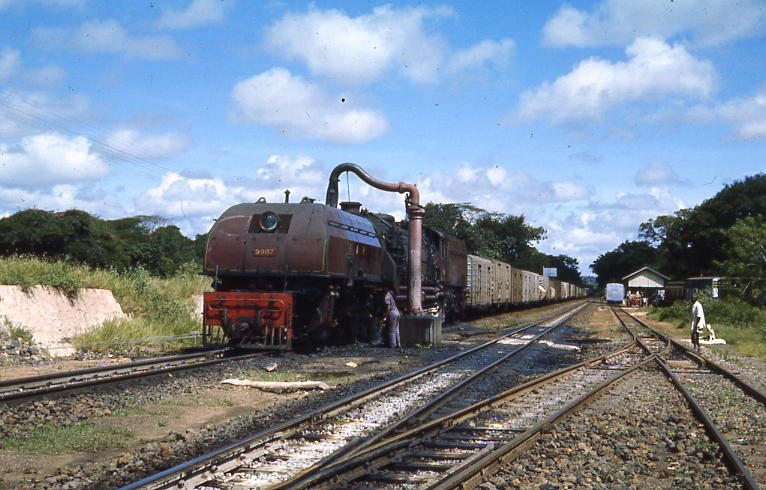
59 class Garratt locomotive 5907 Mount Kinangop at Kibwezi in Kenya

The East African Railways and Harbours Corporation (EAR&H) is a defunct company that operated railways and harbours in East Africa from 1948 to 1977. It was formed in 1948 for the new East African High Commission by merging the Kenya and Uganda Railways and Harbours with the Tanganyika Railway of the Tanganyika Territory. As well as running railways and harbours in the three territories it ran inland shipping services on Lake Victoria, Lake Kyoga, Lake Albert, the Victoria Nile and the Albert Nile.

== Railways ==
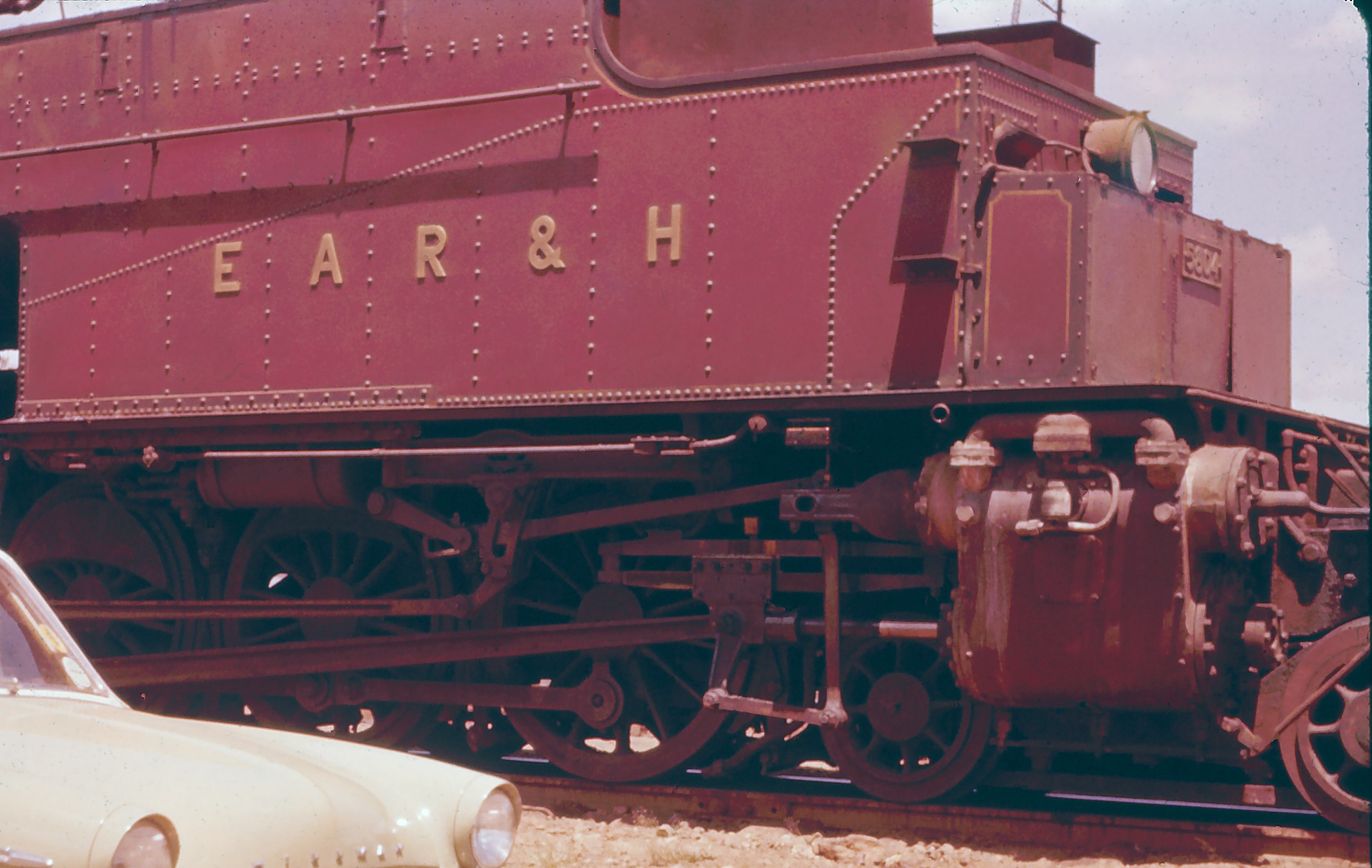
EAR&H Garratt 58 Class no. 5804

The Malayan Railway sold the EAR&H eight metre gauge USATC S118 Class steam locomotives in 1948, and another eight in 1949. The EAR&H converted them to oil burners and numbered them 2701–2716, making them the 27 class and allocating them to its Tabora Depot on its Tanganyika section. They entered service in 1949 and 1950, working the lines to Mwanza, Kigoma and Mpanda where their light axle loading was an advantage and their high firebox enabled them to run through seasonal flooding on the Kigoma and Mpanda branches. EAR&H built further S118 from spare parts in 1953 and numbered it 2717. The EAR&H withdrew them from service in about 1965, and they were moved to Dar es Salaam for scrapping in 1966.

In 1955 and 1956, the EAR&H introduced new and much more powerful steam locomotives for its Kenya and Uganda network: the 59 class Garratt locomotives. These were the mainstay of the section's heaviest traffic between Mombasa and Nairobi until they started to be withdrawn from service between 1973 and 1980.

The EAR&H extended the Uganda Railway from Kampala to the copper mines at Kasese in 1956. In 1962, it completed the northern Uganda railway from Soroti to Pakwach and from there to Arua in 1964, thus superseding the Victoria Nile steamer service.

== International ferries ==
Proposed ferries from East Africa Harbour (E.A.H):

- Lagos
- Cairo
- Canada (Int. Oveaseas)

== Inland ferries ==
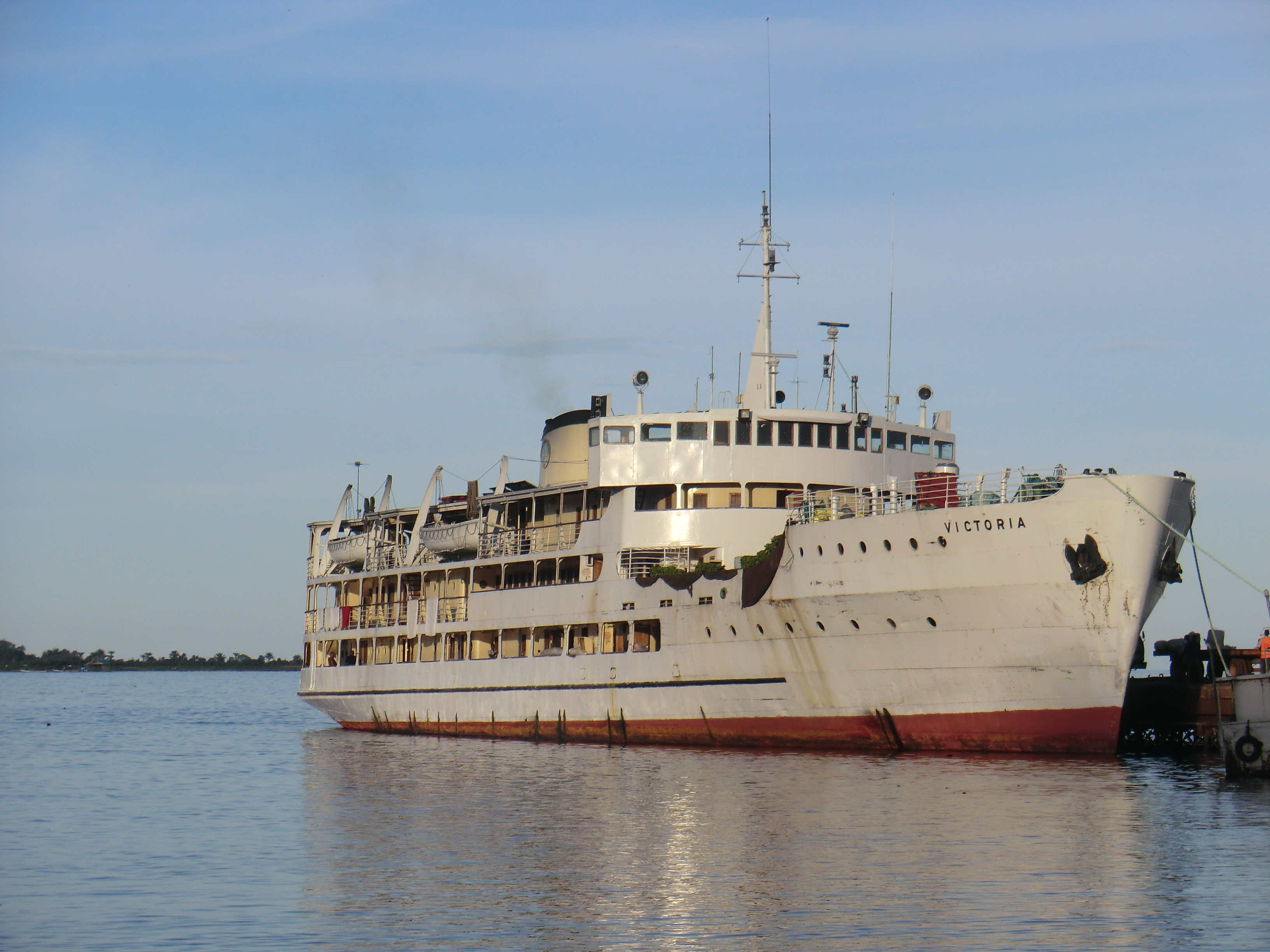
MV Victoria in Bukoba, Tanzania

In 1961, the EAR&H introduced the new Lake Victoria ferry RMS Victoria. This faster vessel doubled the speed of the circular service around the lake, allowing EAR&H to increase sailings from once to twice a week. Elizabeth II designated her a Royal Mail Ship, making it the only EAR&H ship to receive this distinction.

In 1965 and 1966, the EAR&H introduced a train ferry service across Lake Victoria with the MV Umoja and MV Uhuru. In 1967, the EAR&H made harbour improvements at Kisumu on the Kenyan shore of Lake Victoria by scuttling the disused ferry SS Winifred to form a breakwater.

== Dissolution ==
In 1977, the High Commission's successor, the East African Community, was dissolved and EAR&H's rail network was broken up into three national railways: Kenya Railways Corporation, Tanzania Railways Corporation and Uganda Railways Corporation.

== In Culture ==
Kenyan-born singer Roger Whittaker wrote and recorded the song The Good Old EAR&H in about 1982, after a return visit to Kenya.

== See also ==
- Central Line (Tanzania)
- Rift Valley Railways Consortium
- Uganda Railway
- East African Railway Master Plan
