= George Wilson (Chief Colonial Secretary of Uganda) =

Administrator in Uganda (1862–1943)

The right honourable George Wilson CB
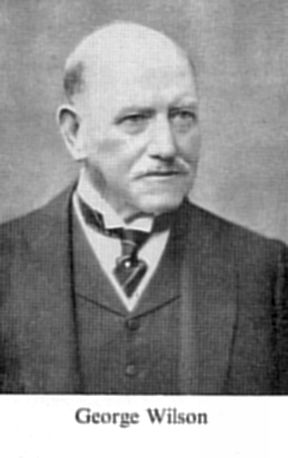

Commissioner and Consul-General of Uganda

H.M. Commander in Chief of the Uganda Protectorate
- In office 20 years
- In office August 1894 – 1 March 1909
- Appointed by: colonial office
- Monarchs: Queen Victoria king Edward VII
- Governor: Sir Henry Hesketh Bell
- Vice Governor: George Wilson CB
- Preceded by: Sir Henry Edward Colvile
- Succeeded by: Lt. Stanley Charles Tomkins CMG, MBE

Personal details
- Born: 13 May 1862 Glasgow, Lanarkshire, Scotland
- Died: 12 December 1943 (Aged 81) Royal Tunbridge Wells
- Spouse(s): Clarissa Adelina Humphreys m. 20 February 1900
- Domestic partner: Swahili woman from Mombasa
- Children: Edward Wilson
- Parent(s): George Wilson and Jane Leslie
- Occupation: retired Government official
- Profession: Colonial administrator, senior civil service, Explorer
- Awards: Companion of the most Honourable order of the Bath (CB)
- Nickname: Bwana Tayari

Military service
- Allegiance: British Empire
- Years of service: 20
- Rank: Chief secretary
- Battles/wars: Sudanese mutiny

George Wilson, CB (of the civil division), (13 May 1862 – 12 December 1943), also known as bwana tayari ("Mr. Ready") among natives in East Africa, was a general staff employee of the Imperial British East Africa Company (1890–1891).

Wilson served as Chief Lieutenant to then-Captain Sir Frederick D. Lugard from 1889 to 1890, and was second in command during Lugard's caravan expedition to Uganda on 6 August 1890. This expedition included 120 Swahilis, nine Persian transport attendants/agriculturalists, and four other Europeans besides Wilson himself. The Europeans were Fenwick De Winton, William Grant, and Archibald Brown.

In 1894, Wilson joined the Uganda Service/government. His first task was to establish a 'native baraza' or council, which he structured as a native administration. He presided over all government matters alongside the Kabaka. He was in civil charge of the Protectorate during the outbreak of the Sudanese mutiny. He was later appointed First Class Transport Officer and First Class Assistant of the Uganda Protectorate on 30 August 1894.

Wilson served as the Sub-Commissioner of the Buganda Kingdom in 1895, and later as Her Britannic Majesty's Acting Commissioner and Commander-in-Chief of the Uganda Protectorate and Consul-General from 5 November 1897 to 29 January 1898. He was awarded the C.B. (Companion of the Order of the Bath) on 2 January 1899 and became an honorary corresponding secretary and non-resident fellow of the Royal Colonial Institute in 1899.

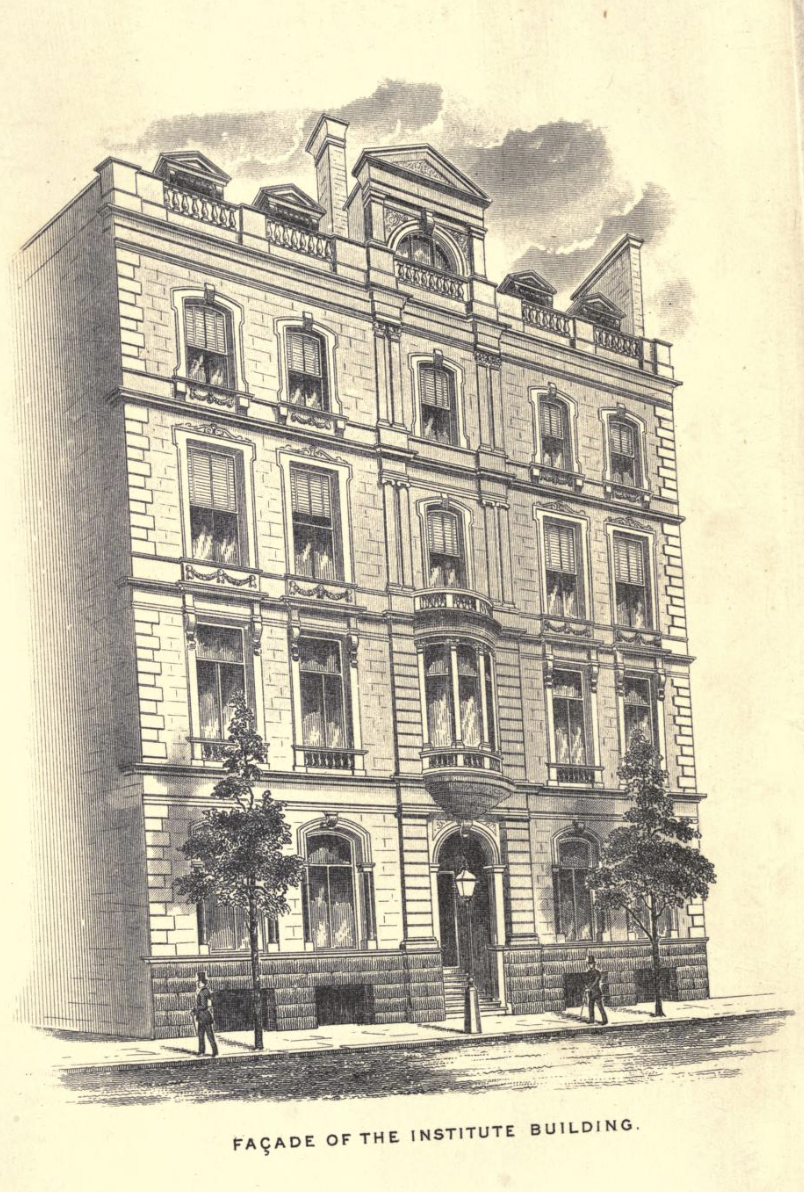
Facade of the Royal Colonial Institute building

Wilson was the first Chief Collector for the Bunyoro district (August 1900 – 17 November 1901). He was responsible for drawing up the 1901 Ankole Agreement and presenting it to the Ankole chiefs and people. This agreement was signed with the approval of the Ankole, the colonial administration, and the UK Government in Whitehall, with Wilson as the protectorate's Chief Negotiator.

Later, Wilson became Deputy Commissioner of the Uganda Protectorate at Entebbe, Government House (1 April 1902 – 1904), and Deputy Governor of the Protectorate (2 December 1907 – 1 March 1909). He also served as His Majesty's Commander-in-Chief and Acting Commissioner of the Uganda Protectorate in 1904–1906 and again from 27 April 1907 to November 1907. Wilson was a fellow at the Royal Society of Arts and received a silver medal on 28 June 1907.

== Early life ==
George Wilson was born in 1862 in Glasgow, Scotland, as the eldest of nine siblings. His father, George Wilson (senior), was a sculptor, while his mother, Jane Leslie, was primarily involved in household duties. At the age of five, George was relocated to Australia, where he grew up in a rough environment.

Wilson later became a music hall entertainer. After discovering a coal mine, he became a working director in Australia and led a regiment he had raised. However, his leadership faced challenges, and his marriage became unstable. In 1888, he embarked on a journey to East Africa as a missionary with his brother, Charles Wilson, and about a year later, he was discovered by an official of the IBEAC.

== Exploration of East Africa and British colonial service ==
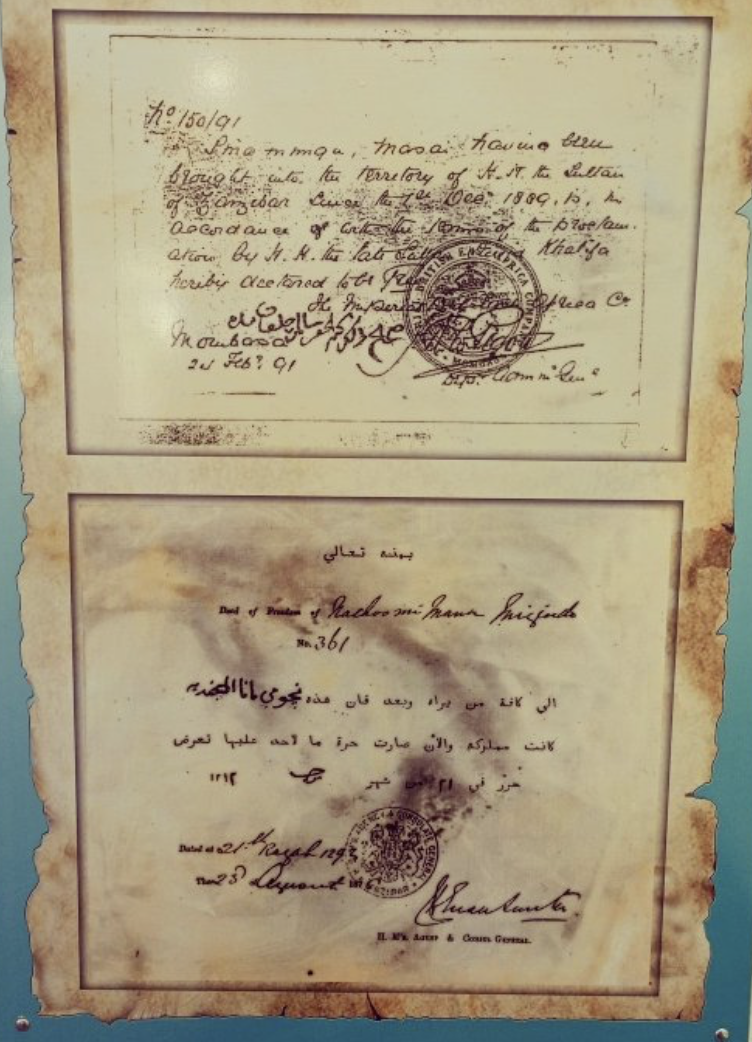
Slave Freedom Certificate issued by the IBEA Co. in Mombasa, 1891

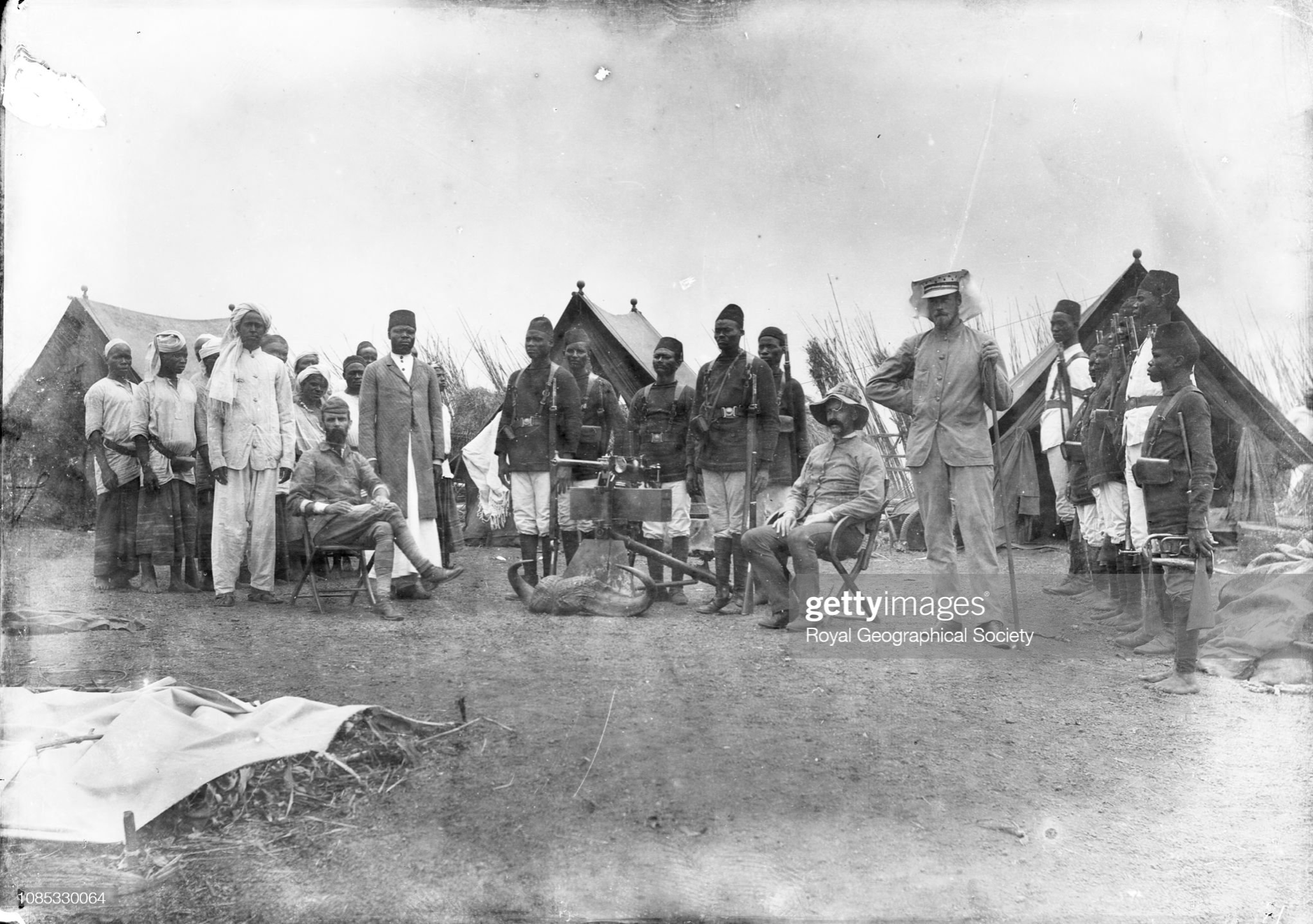
Captain Lugard, F. de Winton, and Grant at Kampala, Mengo

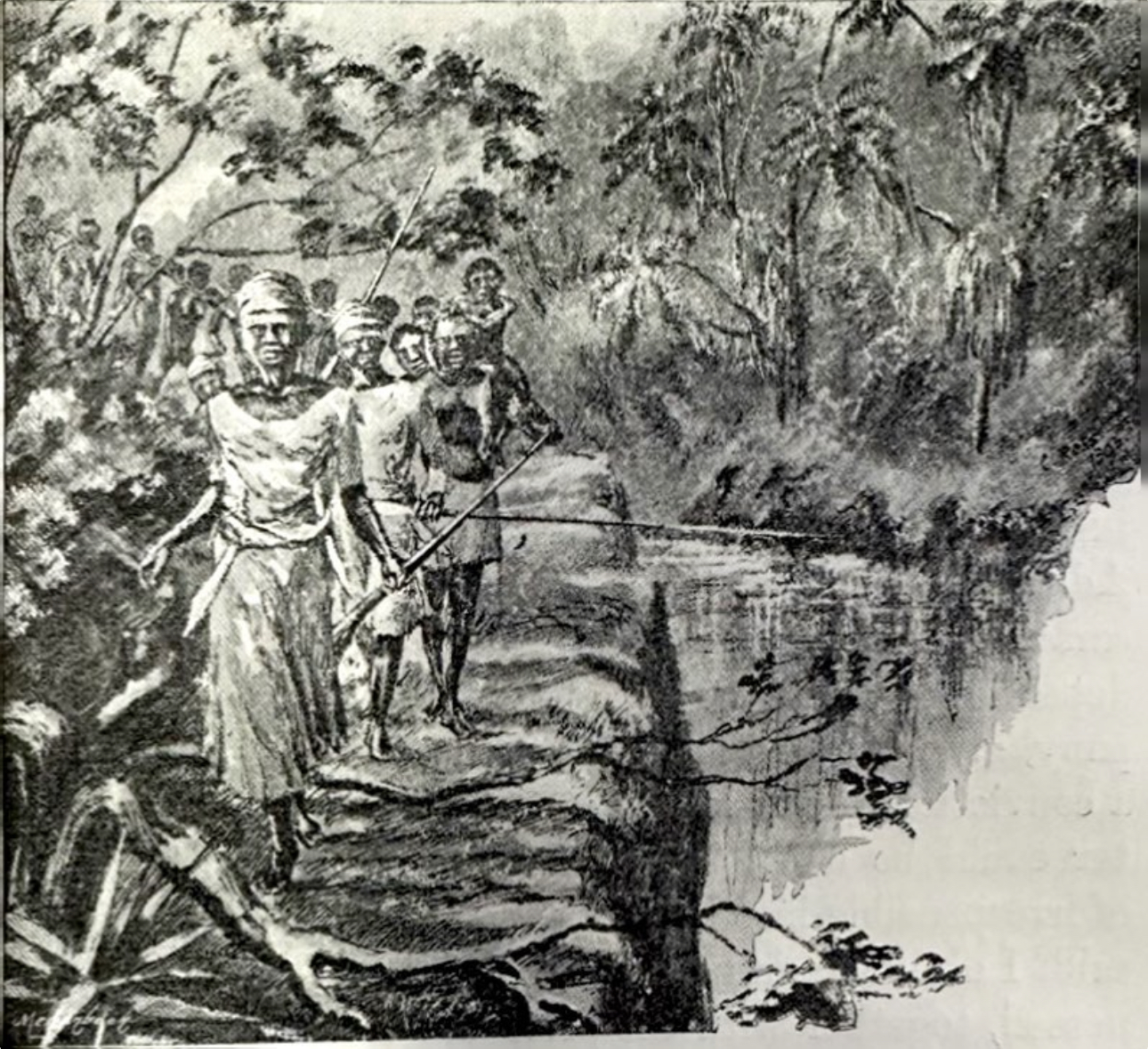
Slaves being freed from the Swahili caravan discovered by Wilson, Lugard, and their team

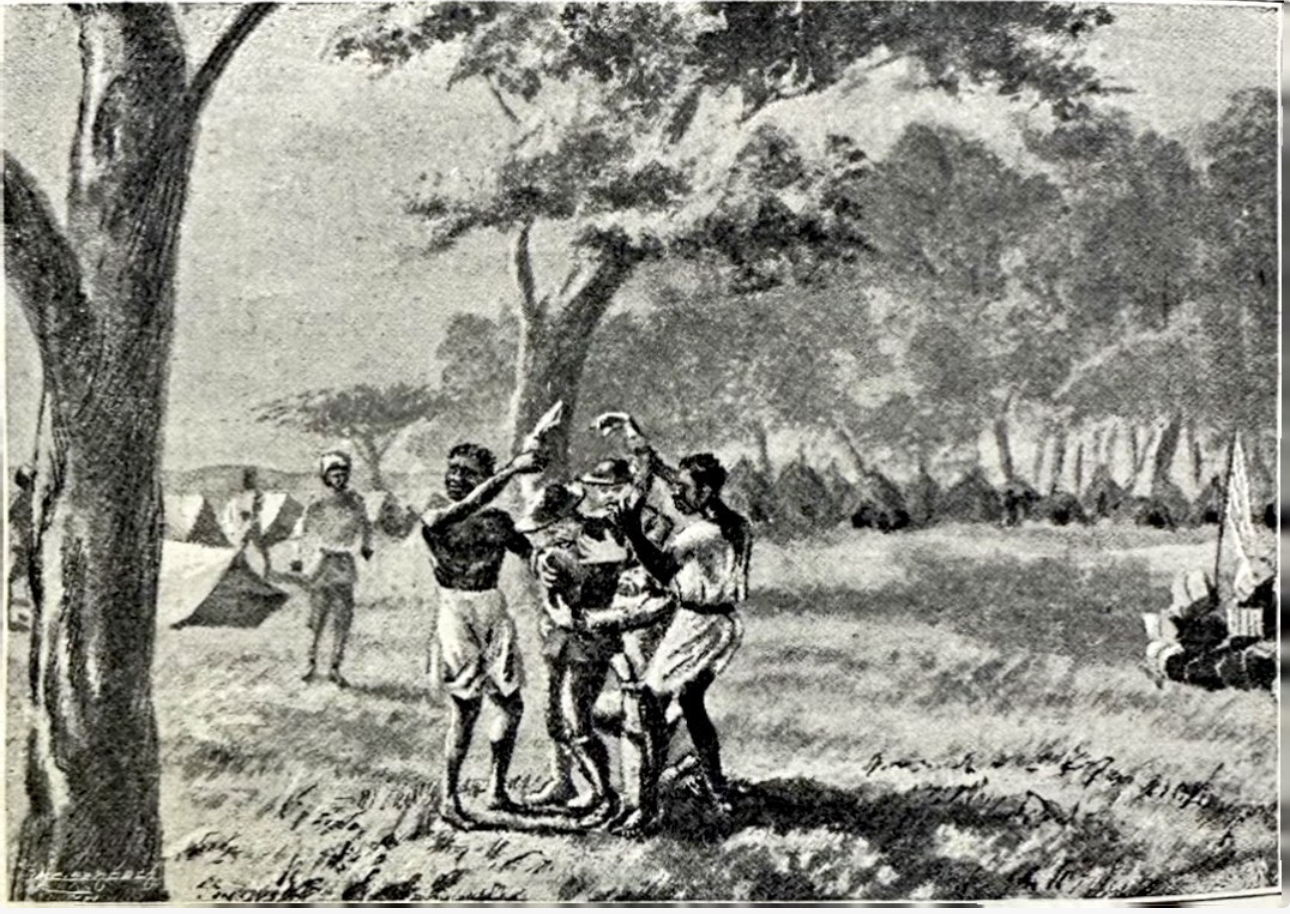
Wilson suffering from another bout of incapacitation and sickness during the expedition

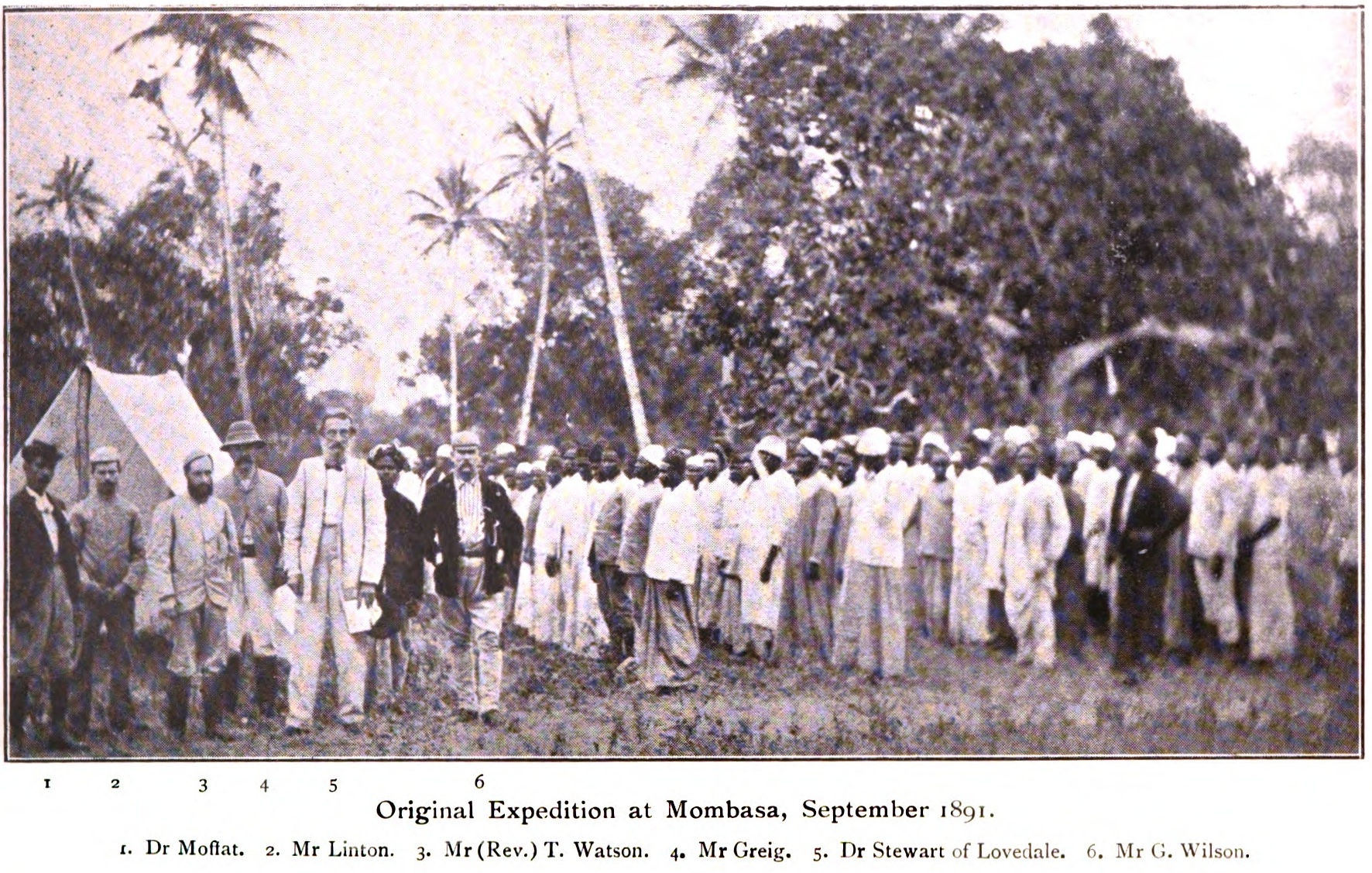
Original industrial missionaries of the Scottish Mission in Mombasa with George Wilson of the IBEA Co., 1891

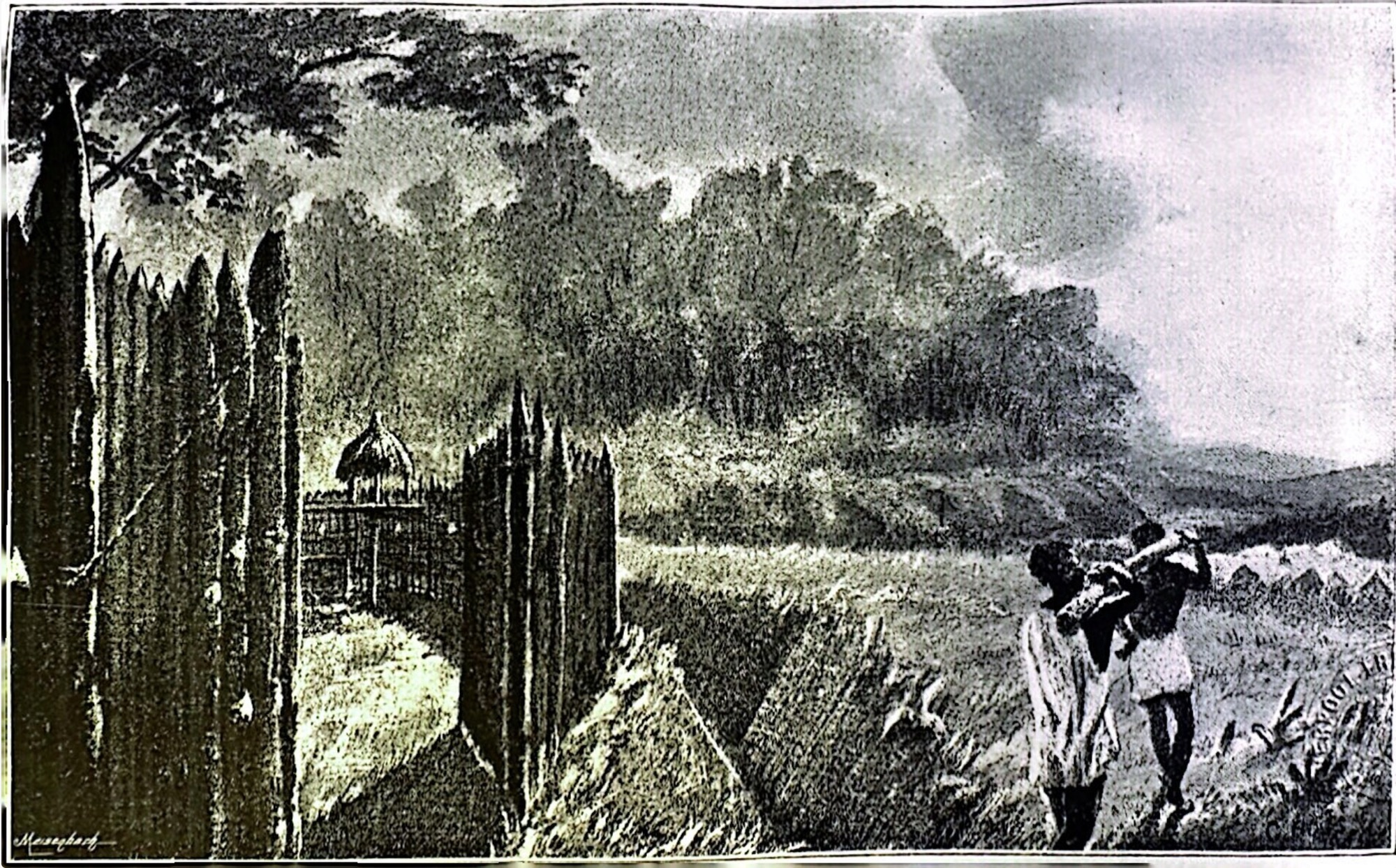
Workers building the stockade at the Dagoretti Fort

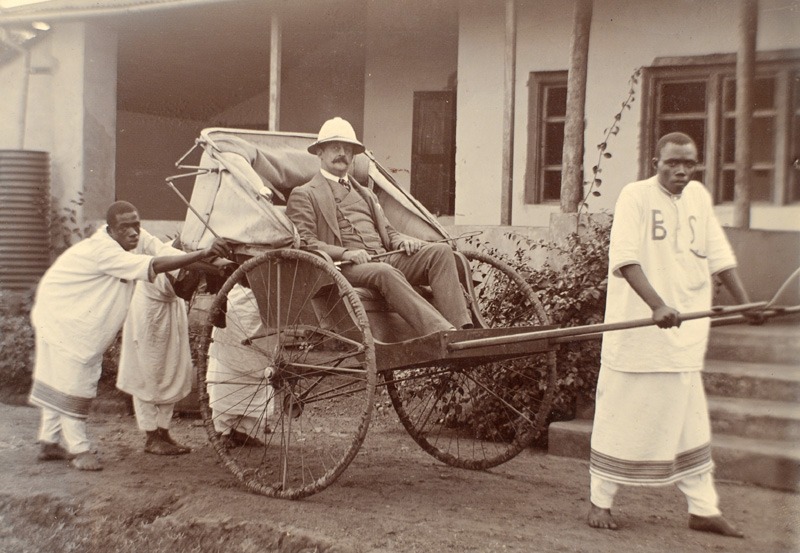
George Wilson seated in a rickshaw with four Ugandans in front and behind the vehicle – circa 1906–09

According to the diaries of Lord Lugard, George Wilson was working with and teaching ex-slaves (whom he helped free) and coastal tribes near Mombasa in January 1889. He was primarily engaged in assisting the missions with fugitive slaves from their Arab masters. Wilson spent at least five months in Fuladoyo, a runaway slave settlement in coastal Kenya, engaged in this work. By 20 December 1889, he joined Lugard's first expedition from Mombasa to Machakos.

Under Lugard's strong persuasion to IBEAC director Mackenzie, Wilson was offered a job by the company, which he joined on 1 January 1890. However, Wilson soon became ill with fever, a condition that persisted throughout the first expedition. This was not the first time Wilson had fallen ill, as he had previously become sick while working in East Africa with his brother the year prior.

Wilson later joined Lugard's second expedition on 6 August 1890, embarking on the Sabaki trip. Lugard's caravan left the coast at Malindi and slowly moved up the Sabaki River. After crossing the Tsavo River, they encountered a Swahili caravan transporting slaves. The traders fled but were later caught by Lugard and placed on trial in Mombasa. Some of the slaves were successfully freed, with malnourished children receiving food and clothing. Between 1890 and 1897, one-third of all slaves in East Africa were reportedly freed by officers of the IBEAC and the 1895 protectorate government, according to Sir Arthur Henry Hardinge, who estimated that at least 26,259 legal slaves (a massive undercount that did not include those living in runaway mission settlements or areas outside their home villages) were held by Muslims in 1897.

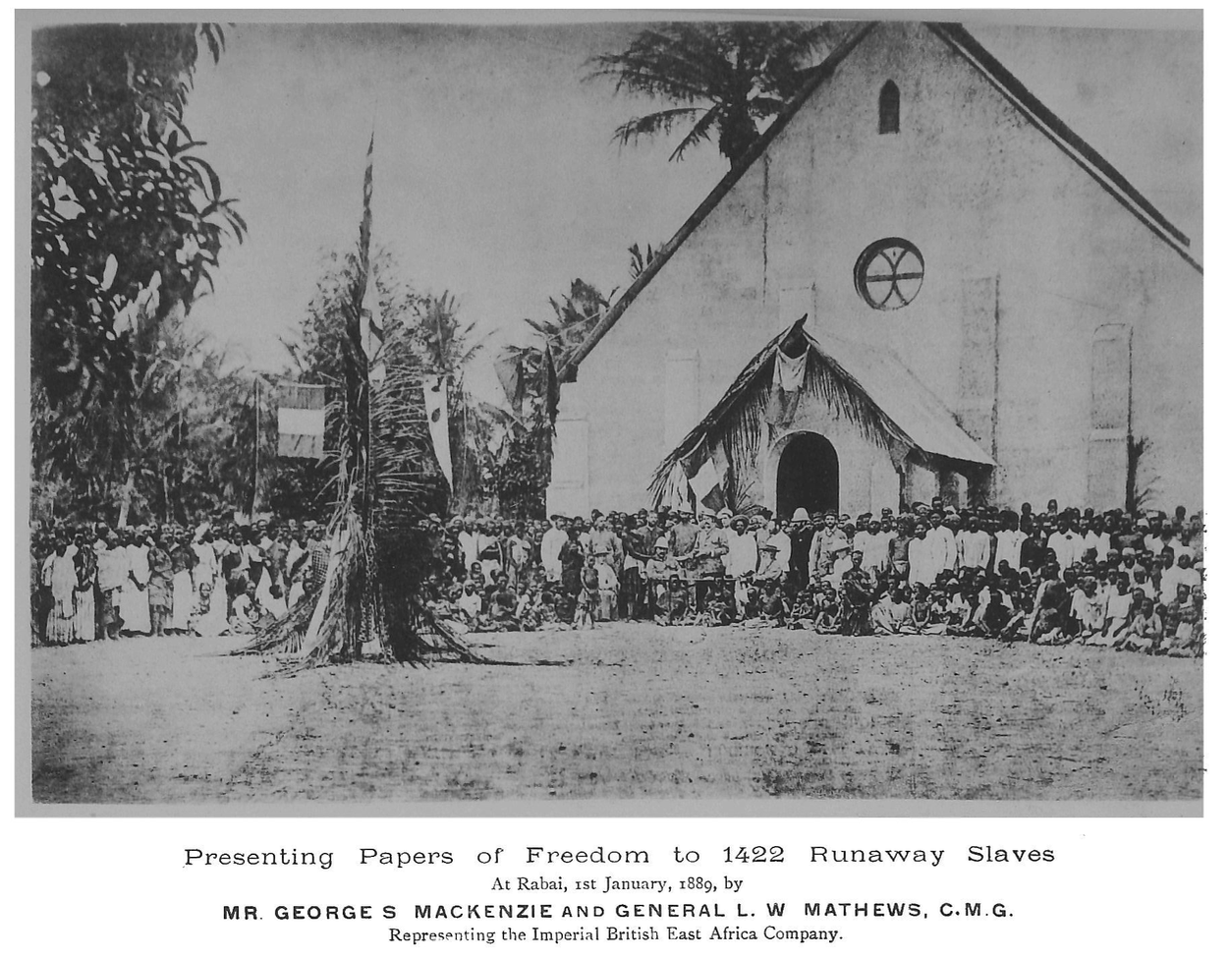
IBEA Co. officials in January 1889 presenting freedom papers to 1,422 runaway slaves at Rabai, the largest Christian mission settlement on the Kenyan coast for fugitive slaves in East Africa.

By 12 September 1890, on Lugard's second expedition, Wilson's health had deteriorated to the point of losing consciousness. Suffering from constant health challenges along the journey and having a weak pulse, Lugard acted quickly by taking Wilson to his tent and using natural medicine, like rubbing him with carbolic oil, to revive him. Whiskey was given to ease the pain, but his health continued to decline. Lugard nursed Wilson day and night, ultimately saving his life.

From various accounts, George Wilson was determined to join Lugard's Uganda expedition in 1890. Lugard held a high opinion of Wilson, praising his success with the Kikuyu and crediting him for teaching valuable lessons in interactions with locals. In August 1891, Wilson was engaged by James Stewart. For a time, Wilson was involved with the Scottish Industrial Mission at Kibwezi and worked on taking control of Fort Dagoretti on 19 September 1891.

In August 1892, on his way back to the coast, Lugard found Wilson at work on the Mackinnon Road, being built by the Mission from Mazeras to Kibwezi. This road, funded by Sir William Mackinnon, was aimed at increasing trade with Uganda. Wilson employed the WaKamba for the 185-mile road construction between Tsavo and Kibwezi, paying them one brass wire ring per day, equivalent to 4 annas.

Following Mackinnon's death, Wilson completed 110 miles of the road and reached 174 miles by 1894.

Wilson joined the Uganda service on 30 August 1894, quickly making his mark as officer in charge of Kampala station. His leadership was recognized, and he was placed in charge of the protectorate region during the Sudanese Mutiny in September 1897.

John Dawson Ainsworth's memoirs recount how Wilson was ambushed by the Wa-Kikuyu under Waiyaki Wa Hinga's command for over a week. This forced Wilson and his men to vacate Fort Dagoretti at night and retreat to Machakos on 30 March 1891 under the advice of Ernest Gedge, along with 30 African soldiers. This marked the first major confrontation between the Agikuyu and British imperial forces. Wilson, praised by both the Kikuyu and the British, did not return to the region, but the Kikuyu regarded him as a leader who maintained the locals' respect.

Wilson was left at the fort by Lugard due to further health setbacks. This led Lugard to make the difficult decision to leave him at a station in Dagoretti with a garrison of thirty men while the rest of the expedition moved forward. Wilson's health, however, improved rapidly in the "cold, bracing air of the mountains," as Lugard claims in his book, The Rise of Our East African Empire.

According to Maina wa Kinyatti, a Marxist historian, the defeat at Dagoretti, along with another successive defeat for Wilson and his men, prevented them from sustaining the attacks led by Waiyaki Wa Hinga. Following the recapture and rebuilding of the station at Dagoretti, they lost control of the previously burned garrison during a dash for safety back to Machakos, where their headquarters was built by Lugard in 1889. This ultimately led to Wilson's replacement by Colonel Erick Smith, who refocused his efforts on building another fort in Kanyonyo, which he later named "Fort Smith."

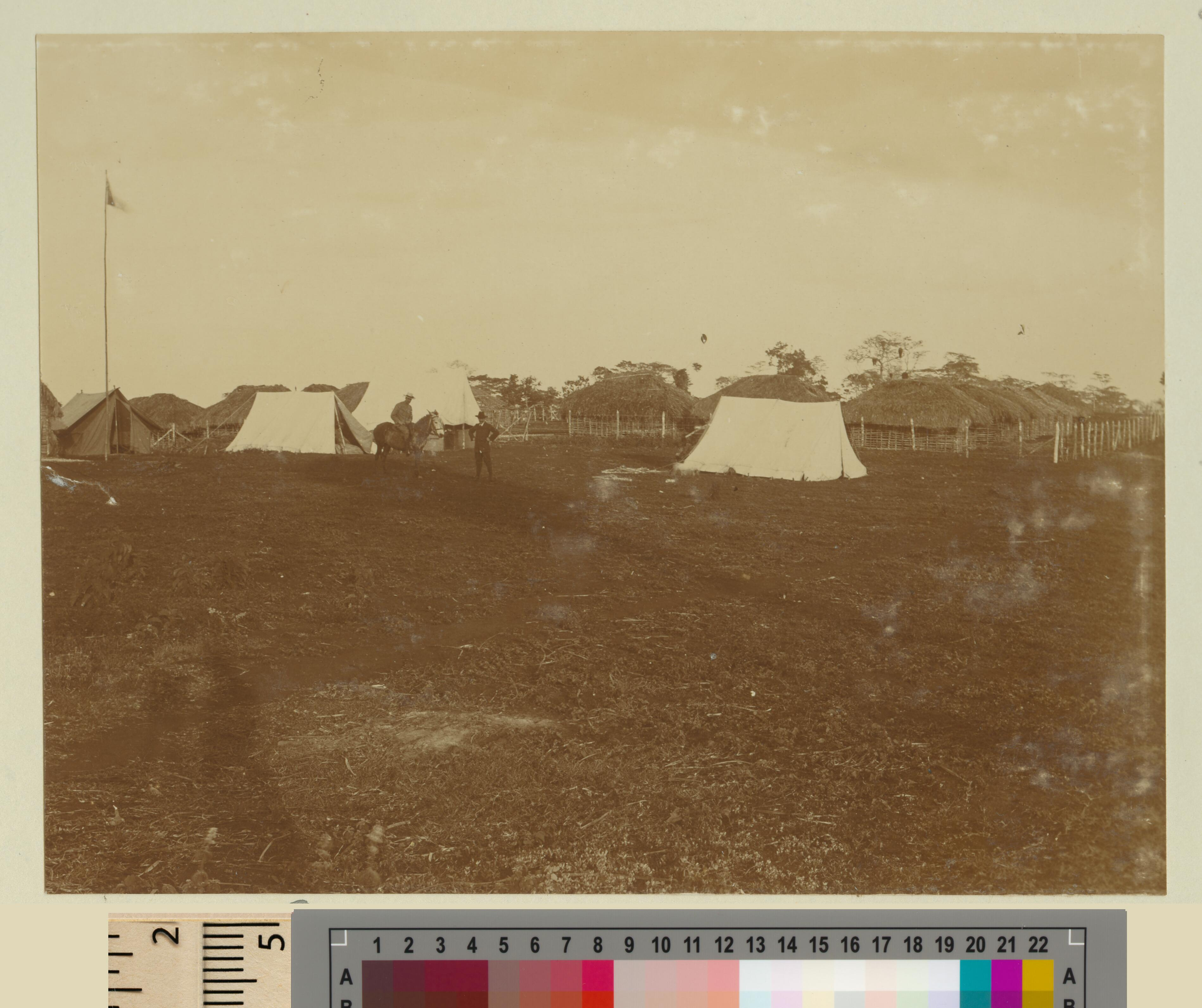
Fort Smith – a government station located a few miles from the Kikuyu mission station in 1901.

On the other hand, when Wilson, who had only barely recovered from his sabaki trip with Captain Lugard, was in charge of the fort that he and Lugard built to near completion in October 1890, he was tasked with finishing it off. However, he could not, along with his 40 porters and askaris, defend against the Kikuyu to remain in the station. He was running out of ammunition and supplies and did not receive any new stock from the coast that was sent to him following Lugard's departure in November 1890. According to multiple accounts, including one from Lugard, he was unfairly dismissed by the IBEA Company for abandoning the station. The company blamed his ambush on the mistreatment of natives.

Even though Wilson and several officials maintained that the company was responsible for the failure due to the lack of assistance even after a request was sent, other accounts from people who met George Wilson, like John Walter Gregory, claim that he was persuaded to retire from his IBEA post by the leaders of a caravan returning from Uganda following the failed project, rather than being abruptly dismissed. This stands in stark contrast to the statement made by the IBEAC's Mackinnon. In a letter to Stewart on 27 October 1891, Mackinnon wrote that Wilson had "failed to conciliate the natives."

Meanwhile, in 1923, Brigadier-General Austin gave his account of what transpired when he was a witness at Fort Smith in 1890. He narrated that hostilities had emerged between the Wa-kikuyu and company officials when Wa Hinga murdered two of Wilson's porters who had gone to his village to buy food for the garrison. Day by day, the number of those killed and wounded in the ensuing Waiyaki besiegement of the company post at Dagoretti increased.

It is hard to find one isolating factor that led to the Kikuyus' besieging of the Dagoretti fort against Wilson and his men, especially considering that Wilson initially struck a positive friendship with the Agikuyu. However, one suggestion from Evanson Wamagatta, an associate professor and author at Biola University, is that days after Lugard left for Uganda, his men and officials at Dagoretti did not honour the IBEA agreement and the blood-brotherhood that Lugard made with the Waikikuyu and its leader Waiyaki. What followed was the forcible recruitment of the Kikuyu as porters, the purposeful theft of food from the Kikuyu, local squabbles between IBEA officials and Kikuyu residents, harassment and sexual assault of Kikuyu women, and the failure to pay the Kikuyu for supplying and delivering food to George Wilson.

Nonetheless, despite his frictional encounters in the first three years of engaging with the natives via IBEA, George's long-term career was not damaged. Furthermore, he was eager and patient when it came to dealing with the natives. He could speak several local languages, having learnt to speak Swahili and Masai from two of his African wives. He had spent a significant period working as an administrator in the Nile province, anxious but determined to push for administrative expansion into the North East. He was known as a good judge of character, earning the nickname bwana tayari, an official who knew the country better than anyone else.

By 30 August 1894, George Wilson was appointed as the first-class transport officer and later as the first-class assistant of the Uganda protectorate. From 31 January 1895, he served as a sub-commissioner of the Buganda Kingdom and was the principal British official in Buganda at the time. From 5 November 1897 to 29 January 1898, Wilson was the acting commissioner and commander-in-chief of the Uganda Protectorate, as well as the consul-general in the absence of Colonel Ternan.

That same year presented the next significant political challenge of Wilson's leadership when British power and political stability in the protectorate came under threat due to the ongoing Sudanese revolt. This prompted Wilson to communicate directly with the UK Prime Minister at 10 Downing, who was also the Secretary of State for Foreign Affairs.

On 5 January, Wilson informed Prime Minister Lord Salisbury in a letter to the UK Foreign Office that he regretted being unable to report the termination of the mutineers in Usoga. Following this, Wilson's leadership was debated in the House of Lords between Lord Stanmore and the President of the Privy Council, the Duke of Devonshire, on 3 March 1898 in the absence of the Prime Minister.

As tensions continued to rise, Wilson issued a letter to Major Macdonald on 16 March, referring to the Sudanese mutiny:

"In Uganda the intensity of the relief experienced on the suppression of the Soudanese mutiny is beyond description. As I anticipated in a previous despatch, the deep gravity of the mutiny has put all local troubles out of focus, and it has been difficult to rouse the native authorities into taking the necessary action for the decisive stamping out of the Mwanga revolt...I had found it necessary some time ago on account of certain previous unauthorised journeys during disturbed periods to warn the Missions that, unless I was informed of all intended movements in the country by their members, I could not undertake to have proper precautions taken for their safety.."

However, following his services against the Sudanese mutineers, whom he defeated with the help of three to four thousand armed Wagandas after leaving from Mengo on 19 October 1898, Wilson was awarded the (Civil) Companion of the Most Honourable Order of the Bath (CB) for his outstanding military efforts. This award is second only to a knighthood – despite not being a trained soldier.

The events began when George Wilson, the chief political officer at the time, uncovered a serious plot during the Nandi expedition. This led to the arrest of two Baganda chiefs: Mukwenda, the Protestant chief of Singo, and the Roman Catholic Kaima chief. George Wilson charged both with incitement to revolt, sentencing them to five and seven years of imprisonment with hard labour at Eldoma Ravine. Meanwhile, Mwanga II had fled.

Further information about the mutiny can be found in Hubert's King's African Rifles. In the following years, Wilson oversaw important developments in the Protectorate region, including the Buganda Agreement of 1900. In 1901, George Wilson visited Ankole and concluded that the country was ready for an agreement. Under Jackson's instructions, he drafted the Ankole Agreement, similar to the Toro Agreement, presenting it with great care to the chiefs and people of Ankole. The agreement was signed on 7 August 1901. Jackson then wrote to the Foreign Office, informing Lord Lansdowne, Britain's Foreign Secretary, with a despatch on 25 October:

"This Agreement Is, I consider a very fair one to the Kabaka and chiefs, and entails no actual out-of-pocket expenditure in the form of subsidies. It is one which will cause the Kabaka and chiefs to interest themselves in the question of taxation, and, in view of the fact that it was drawn up at their own special request by Mr. Wilson after he had ample opportunity of judging them and their capabilities, I venture to submit it, with confidence for your Lordship’s ratification".

To Which the foreign secretary though displeased but satisfied with Wilson's deal, responded with a ratification of the agreement, the foreign minister's assistant named Brooke informed Jackson:

"His Lordship observes that the Agreement is said to follow the lines of that entered into regarding Toro, of which, however, a copy has not reached this Department. Lord Lansdowne approved the object with which it has been drawn. But although the Agreement is described as a draft it appears to have been signed by a number of natives who probably considered it as a completed document. For this reason, His Lordship is unwilling to criticise it in detail or to make alterations which would suggest themselves were such criticism undertaken, as the result might be to shake the confidence of the native signatories in the good faith of the administration." Therefore, Wilson's Ankole deal was confirmed by the Foreign Office on 30 January 1902.

However, the agreement was later withdrawn by the protectorate government following the murder of the Ankole sub-commissioner, Mr. Henry Galt, who was described as a "ruthless" administrator that mistreated the locals. The agreement was reinstated in 1912.

George Wilson was deeply involved in shaping the administrative policies of Uganda by working closely with local chiefs and establishing a formal relationship with them. This was to create an administrative system of governance that worked for everyone. One of the ways Wilson did this was by increasingly relinquishing more judicial responsibility to chiefs in the local hierarchy and to the African courts. This system, crafted through Wilson's innovation, became the style and format of administration in Uganda for the following 60 years, and he was subsequently described as the chief architect of Uganda's native policies.

Wilson also played a crucial role in tempering the hostile behavior of senior officials at Entebbe towards Bunyoro natives. On 1 April 1902, he was appointed the deputy commissioner of the Uganda protectorate in Entebbe until 1906. During this time, Commissioner Wilson helped advance the efforts of the Sleeping Sickness Commission, made up of medical experts and other officials sent by the British Royal Society to investigate the Sleeping Sickness outbreak in Uganda, which peaked by 1910 and claimed 250,000 lives by the time it ended in 1920.

Wilson also lobbied the Colonial Office to provide greater protections to African farmers, including the right to kill elephants that frequently attacked people. However, the underlying reason for this lobbying, which he and Sadler (whom Wilson was deputy to) pursued, was to maintain the annual colonial income. This is evidenced by Wilson's attendance at the 1906 Annual General Meeting hosted by the Royal African Society in London, where he stated that the value and volume of ivory exports had recently fallen for the Protectorate colony, thereby reducing colonial income for that financial year.

From 1904 to 1906, George was appointed His Majesty's commander in chief and acting commissioner of the Uganda protectorate. During this period, he received multiple outbreak reports, one of which is well documented in the Journal of the Royal Army Medical Corps.

The situation became serious enough that Wilson sent a despatch to the Foreign Office due to the lack of medical assistance from London as the metropole. Dated November 1904, the letter informed Foreign Secretary Lansdowne of the risks posed to the Unyoro district and the unsuccessful epidemiological efforts of the scarce public health officials, along with the skeleton laboratory team at Entebbe, stating:

"Present researches here must be somewhat purely academic, and, however resultant of facts of intense scientific interest, are not sufficiently advancing our hopes of prevention".

Following the persistence of the epidemic, Wilson issued a notice in January 1908 banning all fishing activities on Lake Victoria, as it was assessed to increase the risk of spreading the disease. "All fishing upon the lake shores is illegal; any subject of His Highness found fishing would be liable to punishment," the notice stated in part.

Amidst all this, Wilson was responsible for a range of day-to-day engagements and administration roles. He led the inquiry into the death of Harry George Galt, a man regarded as a ruthless colonial officer who had recently been appointed sub-commissioner of the western province of the protectorate, before being murdered with a spear by a native. Wilson believed Galt's death was politically motivated and cautioned in 1905 that the spirit of unrest in Ankole would not subside until the Protectorate government thoroughly investigated and took decisive actions against the perpetrators. Edward I. Steinhart's book, published in 1977, delves into the investigation and the decisions George Wilson made following the inquiry.

The Galt series article also provides an in-depth look at Henry Galt and his murder. On 28 March 1907, Sir Henry Hesketh Bell wrote to the Secretary of State for the Colonies, Victor Bruce, to inform him that his deputy, George Wilson C.B., would be drawing up the annual colonial report for the financial year of 1905–06 for the East African Protectorate. This was because Wilson had administered the protectorate government for a significant portion of the year under review.

Less than a month later, on 27 April 1907, upon Sir Hesketh Bell's leave, Wilson took over once again as H.M. commander in chief of the Uganda Protectorate until at least 22 October 1907.

When Sir Hesketh Bell returned, he became deputy commissioner. However, after (then Under-Secretary of State for the Colonies) Sir Winston Churchill's visit to Uganda in December of that year, Sir Hesketh Bell was appointed governor, which automatically made George Wilson deputy governor of the Uganda Protectorate.

Wilson was then tasked with setting up relief measures in response to the Busoga famine in 1908, after Hesketh Bell sent him from Entebbe to investigate the crisis.

Wilson reported back to Bell, stating, "From all the information I could gather, it appeared that 50 to 75 percent of the population of about 300,000 were in imminent danger of starvation."

Wilson retired from his position as deputy governor of the protectorate due to ill health on 1 March 1909. Despite this, he retired with one of the highest pensions and annual salaries among officials that year.

However, Wilson was not without controversy. He faced criticism for his handling of the Nyangire rebellion. Initially, Wilson did not believe that the natives were capable of such sophisticated political thought and action. Instead, he thought that Catholic missionaries were behind the rebellion, attempting to undermine their Protestant rivals. This belief was further emphasized when, shortly after the suppression of the rebellion and the arrest and subsequent exile of 54 Bunyoro chiefs from the kingdom – 49 of whom were Catholic and later replaced with 51 Protestants – Wilson wrote:

"The conspiracy had been marked with such able organisation and recusancy for a long period so quietly and persistently sustained as to stamp it with the suspicion of non-native guidance."

Later, in a speech at the Royal Society of Arts on 15 January 1907, Wilson remarked:

"Natives under a wise restraint can be like good and even clever children, whereas natives in their wild impulses and with passions aflame can be very devils incarnate."

He also expressed strong white supremacist sentiments, stating:

"We are the superior race by virtue of our ability to teach and to restrain, and the natives readily acknowledge this, as they readily throw themselves upon us for the responsibility of judgments in decisions in all grave crises and will continue to do so until generations of civilisation remedy their mental defects, or we gratuitously or out of mistaken sentiment throw them entirely upon themselves."

These views, combined with a desire to foster British-style governance and administration in Uganda, partially explain the ways in which Wilson governed the territory. Nonetheless, his policies had a profound impact on the geopolitics of the kingdom for decades to come. Wilson was particularly proud that Uganda was becoming "less anti-malarial" under his leadership, especially in the area of health.

== Achievements and Honours ==
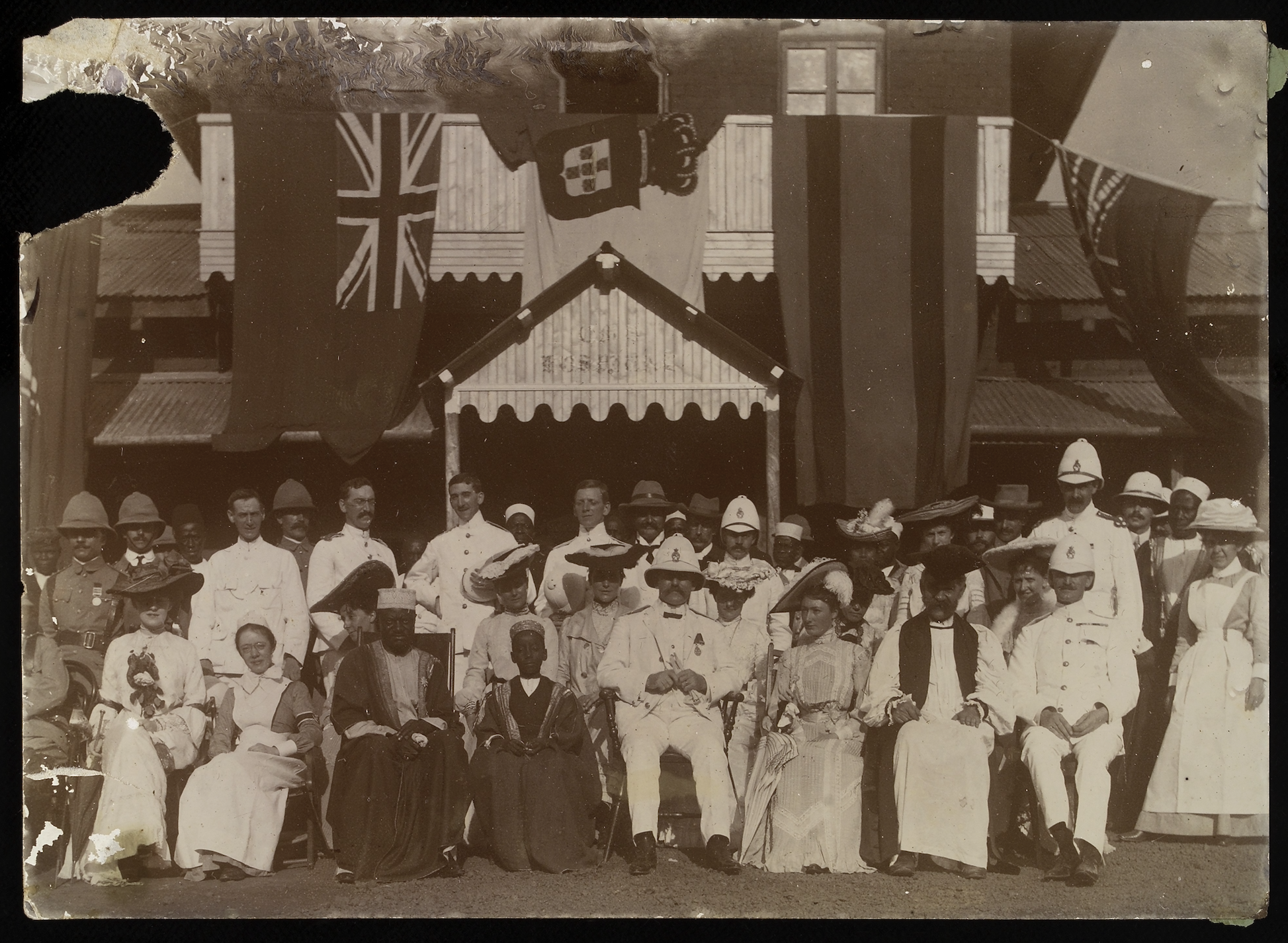
Group photo from the opening of Mengo Hospital, with H.M. Commissioner George Wilson at the centre.

On 28 November, Mengo Hospital (also known as Namirembe Hospital) was founded by Acting Commissioner George Wilson.

Hoima, a chain of forts in the Bunyoro District, dates back to 1894. It was established as the capital of Bunyoro in 1900 by Commissioner Wilson. From that point on, it was formally recognised as the chief administrative centre of the Bunyoro District.

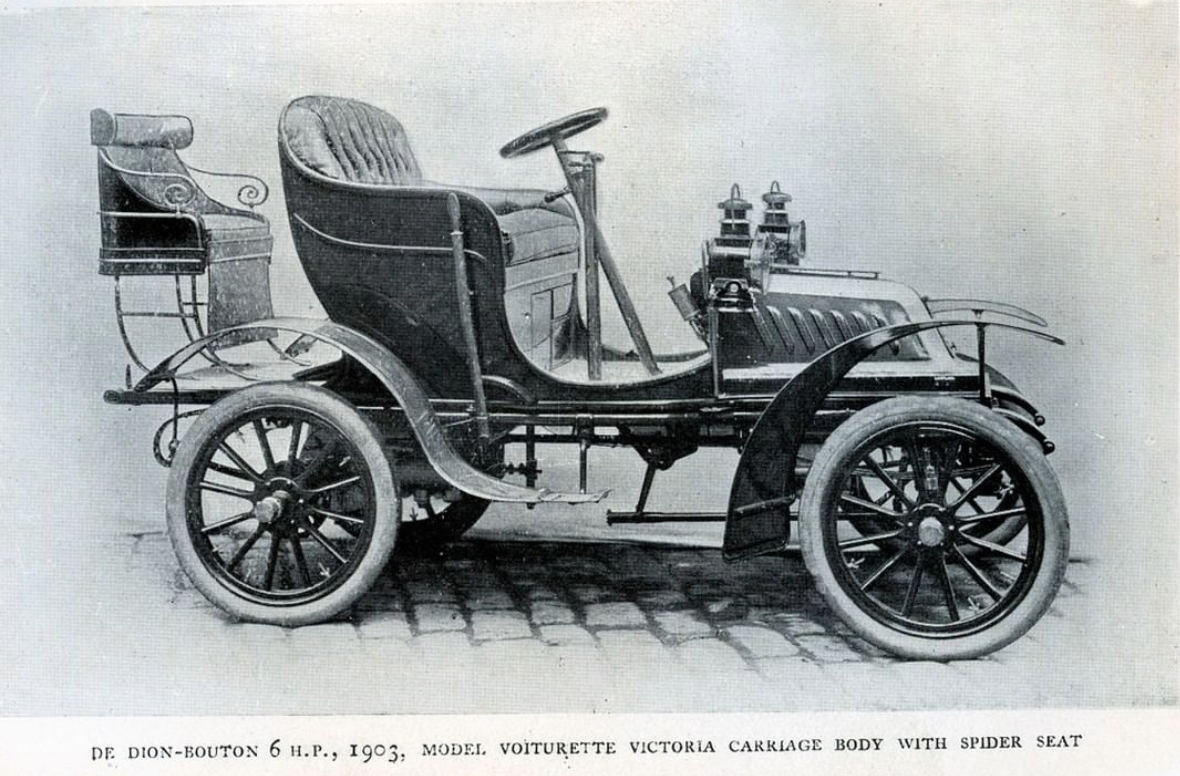
De Dion Bouton Model Voiturette Victoria Carriage Body with Spider Seat

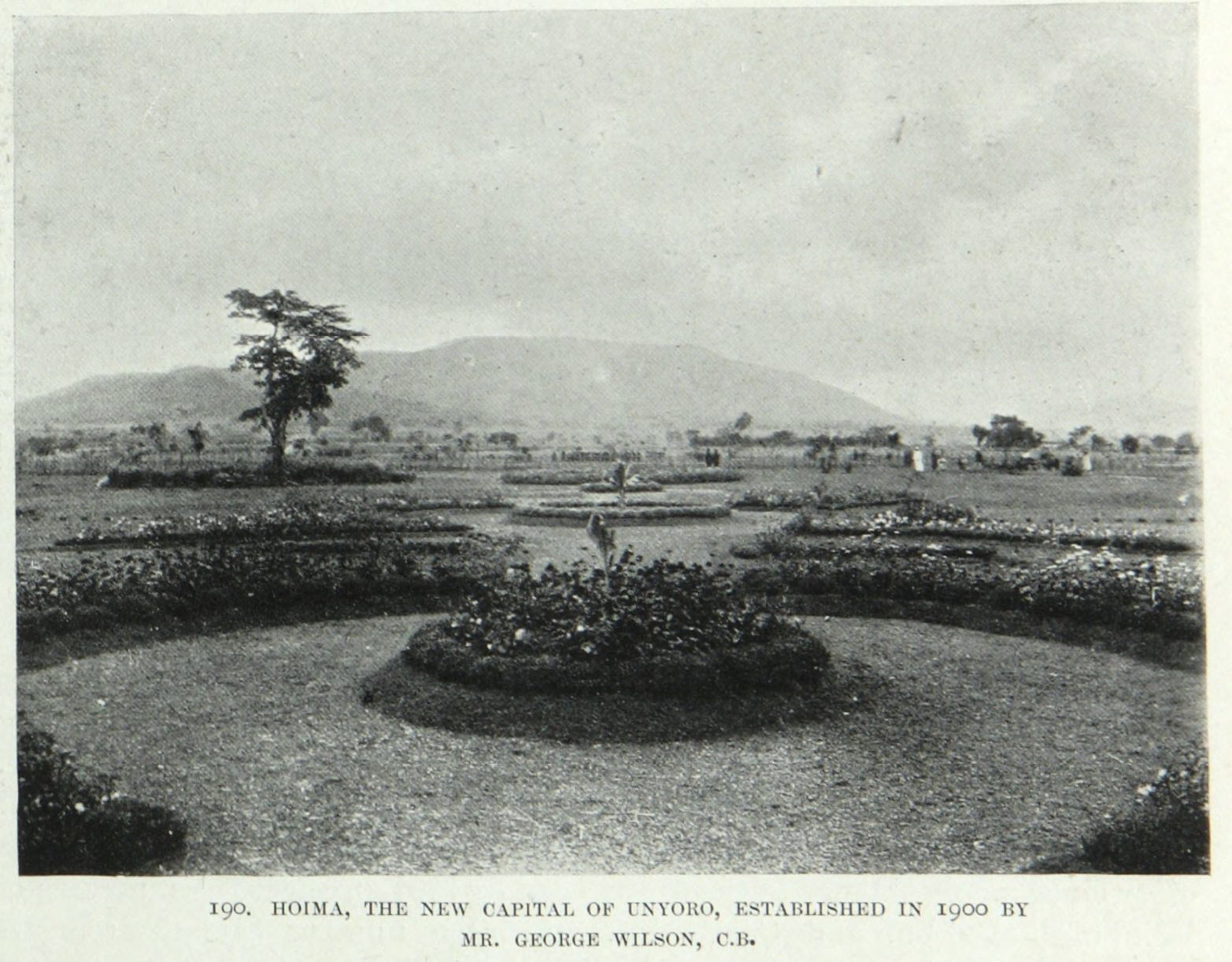
A photograph taken by Commissioner Wilson of Hoima, the newly established capital of Bunyoro, in 1900.

Due to his outstanding service and leadership during the 1894 Sudanese mutiny, Wilson was awarded a CB on 2 January 1899. Albert Ruskin Cook reflects on Wilson's work post-retirement in his book, remarking, "he (George Wilson) richly deserved his CB."

Wilson introduced automobiles to East Africa Protectorate, acquiring and driving his first car – a De Dion Bouton – lowered from a steamship arriving from France at the port of Mombasa in December 1903. Author Gavin Bennett wrote, "Summoning what breath and dignity he could muster, George Wilson sat poker stiff at the wheel of Kenya’s first-ever car and, staring fixedly ahead, he uttered the historic cry: PUSH!...The eccentric George Wilson offloaded a curious contraption called a De Dion Bouton before a bemused gathering of pith helmets and parasols at Mombasa’s old port... Wilson, ably assisted by his wife, had to pay earnest attention to a service manual to discover where to put the oil and grease and how to adjust the various brass levers on the steering wheel to get the spark and fuel mixture just right... when he finally got the engine to fire, he had indeed started something. For while his De Dion was the only car in Kenya, it was a sluggish conveyance. But the moment another car followed in its tracks, it became a racing machine."

He had a keen interest in automobiles and is reported to be the first European to drive a motor car in Uganda. In April 1904, he returned to Africa with a 25-horsepower motor vehicle to tour the protectorate via over 600 miles of road built since 1890, using fuel he regularly imported from Bombay Presidency.

Wilson spent time writing about his experiences living in the tropical country of Uganda, and his 28-page notes were published as a book called Uganda; notes for travellers, by Mr. George Wilson, CB, which can also be found in the UK national archives website in their colonial office records.

On the evening of 7 November 1906, while he was still H.M. Commander-in-Chief of Uganda, Wilson attended the annual meeting in London, where he was the special guest of honour hosted by the Royal African Society. He read out his much-anticipated paper titled "The Progress of the Uganda Protectorate," receiving much praise. A few months later, on 15 January 1907, he presented the same paper as the principal guest at the Royal Society of Arts, chaired by his old friend and comrade Sir Frederick Lugard. Five months later, on 28 June 1907, Wilson was awarded a silver medal and made a fellow of the Royal Society of Arts for his important contributions via the paper he wrote on the progress of the Uganda Protectorate.

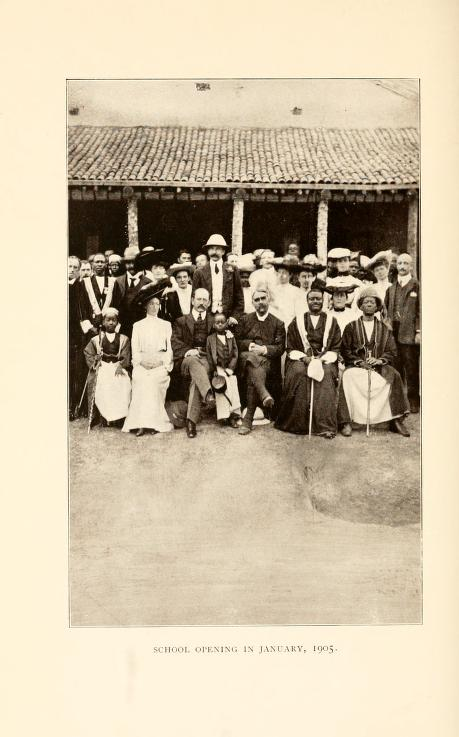
School opening photograph featuring Commissioner Wilson alongside his wife and various officers and officials.

Wilson was also involved in developing an efficient postage system in Uganda, given the poor communication systems at the time. He consulted with Rev. Ernest Millar, who worked for the Church Missionary Society at Mengo, to take up this responsibility.

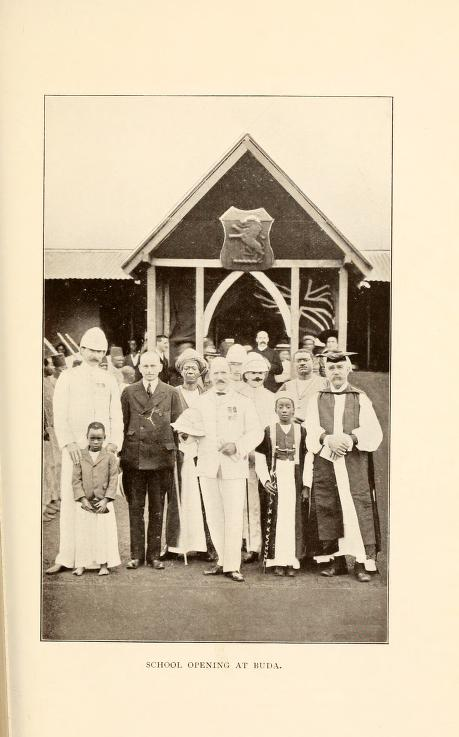
Official photograph of the formal opening of King's College Budo in Uganda.

On 25 January 1905, Wilson formally opened Mengo High School, marking a significant step forward for education. The following year, on 29 March 1906, Wilson, still the acting commissioner, declared the opening of King's College Budo, alongside the youngest native King, Daudi Chwa, and Alfred Tucker, who were present in the official photograph.

On the morning of 15 January 1908, Wilson's secretary used a typewriter to record instructions from the deputy governor – George Wilson. Wilson instructed every colonial administration in the land to buy all items of antique and cultural value and send them to the colonial capital, Entebbe, which was only agreed upon at the last minute.

Wilson's letter stated: "I am directed to inform you that His Excellency the Governor has made arrangements for the opening in Entebbe of a Protectorate Museum for the collection of local curios of all descriptions, such as articles of interest, specimens of native weapons and manufactures, and local products, including vegetables and minerals. In fact, it will collect all articles of historical, ethnological, and local industrial interest."

The Uganda Museum is now the oldest museum in East Africa. It was founded in 1908 by Deputy Governor George Wilson, who first proposed the idea in 1902 to collect objects of interest throughout the protectorate region. The items were initially housed in Fort Lugard (1908), then moved to the Margaret Trowell School of Art at Makerere in 1941. Later, funds were raised to provide a permanent home, and the museum moved to Kitante Hill in 1954. Interestingly, there is a place called Fort George in western Uganda, built by Captain Lugard, named after George Mackenzie and George Wilson.

== Personal life ==
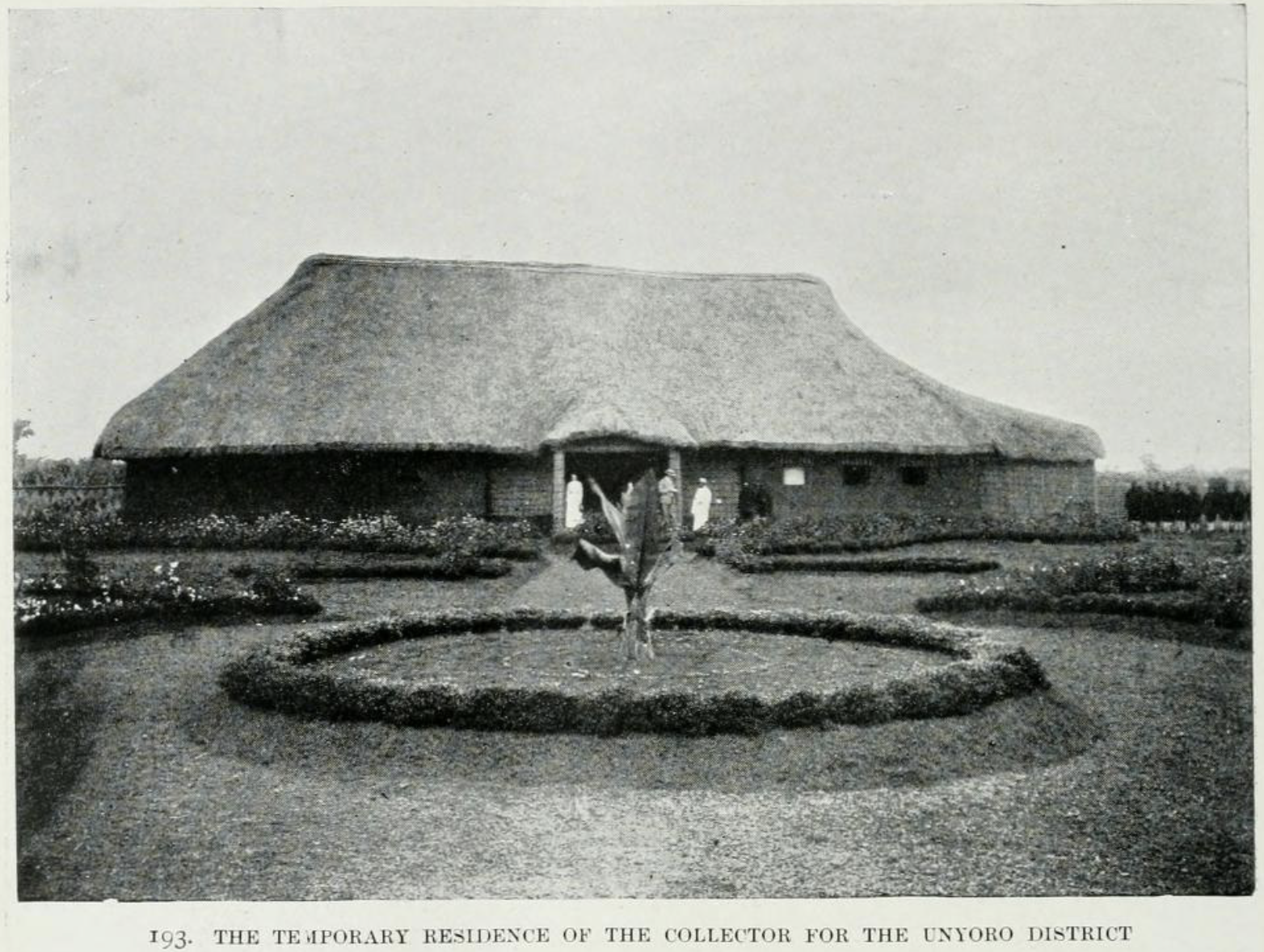
Government House for Deputy Commissioner Wilson and his wife in Bunyoro, 1900.

After departing from East Africa via Mombasa, Wilson headed for England for the first time on 27 September 1899 aboard the SS Bundesrath (DOAL) with six months of holiday leave. He met and married Clarissa Adelina Humphreys, the daughter of Colonel James Charlton Humphreys, on 20 February 1900 in St Stephen's in East Twickenham. Shortly after, the couple returned to Mombasa on 19 April 1900 aboard the SS Herzog (DOAL). Clarissa attended state events with Wilson, including a parade ceremony in Busindi, where he received a medal for his role in suppressing the Sudanese revolt. She also played lawn tennis with him in their garden at the Government House in Hoima.

By 1922, they were living at 6 Marine Parade in Hythe, Kent. The 1921 England and Wales census confirmed their residence there, long after Wilson had retired from colonial service and shortly after he and his wife moved from Laleham, Middlesex. They later moved to The Farthing, Lyminge, in Kent. Their final move was to Royal Tunbridge Wells, Kent, confirmed by the 1939 England and Wales census, to live out their lives. Wilson died on 12 December 1943 at Royal Tunbridge Wells, and his obituary was published by the Royal Society of Arts. His widow, Clarissa, died on 5 July 1958 at Southfields Nursing Home in Eastbourne, Sussex.

In late 1894, George Wilson replaced Ansorge as the chief British official at Kampala. At that time, he had two African wives, one of whom was Zanzibari and the other a Maasai, kept locked up in the Kampala fort. He learned to speak Swahili and the Maasai language from his wives. Wilson had at least one child named Edward Wilson with his Swahili-speaking wife from Mwembe Tayari in Mombasa.

== Published work ==
- "The progress of the Uganda Protectorate"
- Uganda; notes for travellers, by Mr. George Wilson, CB (28 pages)

== Bibliography ==
- "Lugard, Frederick John Dealtry, Baron Lugard (1858–1945)", Oxford Dictionary of National Biography, Oxford University Press, 6 February 2018, doi:10.1093/odnb/9780192683120.013.34628
- Purvis, John Bremner (1909). Through Uganda to Mount Elgon. London: London: T. Fisher Unwin. p. 165. doi:10.5479/sil.797154.39088018045773.
- Thomas, Harold Beken (1956). "The Wilsons of early Uganda". The Uganda Journal. 20 (2): 210.
- Thomas, Harold Beken (1934). "George Wilson and Dagoretti Fort". The Uganda Journal. 23 (2): 173.
- Goldsmith, F. H. (1955). John Dawson Ainsworth, pioneer Kenya administrator, 1864–1946 (1st ed.). London: Macmillan. pp. 18–19.
- Nicholls, Christine (2005). Red Strangers: The White Tribe of Kenya (1st ed.). London: Timewell Press. p. 10. ISBN 1857252063.
- Hattersley, Charles William (1968). Baganda at Home (1st ed.). Oxfordshire: Routledge. p. 33.
- Dunbar, A.R. (1965). A History of Bunyoro-Kitara (PDF) (1st ed.). Oxford: Oxford University Press. pp. 101–08.
- The Foreign Office List and Diplomatic and Consular Year Book for 1906 (1st ed.). London: Harrison and Sons. January 1906. p. 388.
- Low, Anthony Donald (2009). Fabrication of Empire: The British and the Uganda Kingdoms, 1890–1902 (1st ed.). Cambridge: Cambridge University Press. p. 226.
- Reports of the Sleeping Sickness Commission (1st ed.). London: Harrison and Sons. 1905. p. 7. ISBN 1354892674.
- "Journal of the Royal Army Medical Corps by John Bale, Sons & Danielsson". Journal of the Royal Army Medical Corps. 5: 582. 1903.
- Kiewiet, Marie J. De (1955). History of the Imperial British East Africa Company 1876–1895 (1st ed.). London: University of London.
- Annual Reports on the Colonies for 1905–6 no. 525 (PDF) (1st ed.). London: foreign office. June 1907. p. 3.
- "Kenya Gazette". The Official Gazette of the East Africa and Uganda Protectorates. 9 (192). Kenya: 442. 1 November 1907.
- Uganda Protectorate Blue Book for the year ended 31st March, 1914. Government of Uganda Protectorate, Entebbe. 31 March 1914. p. 16.
- "Further Memories of Uganda by Sir Albert Cook". The Uganda Journal. 2 (2): 98. 1934.
- "the progress of the Uganda Protectorate by George Wilson". Journal of the Society of Arts. 55 (2828): 282. 1 February 1907. JSTOR 41335951.
- "Journal of the Society for Arts, Vol. 55, no. 2849". Journal of the Society of Arts. 55 (2849): 821. 28 June 1907. JSTOR 41335974.
- Nam, Joe. "Treasure's From Uganda's Past". New Vision.
- The first sixty years by G. P. McGregor. Oxford University press. 1967. p. 6. OCLC 823925.
- The Church Missionary Gleaner. Church Missionary Society. 1915. p. 134.
- Moyse-Bartlett, H. (2012). The King's African Rifles – Volume 1. Andrews UK Limited. p. 69. ISBN 978-1-78150-661-5.
- Steinhart, Edward I. (1972). Transition in Western Uganda, 1891–1901: Resistance and Collaboration in the Ankole, Bunyoro and Toro Kingdoms of Uganda (Thesis) (1st ed.). Northwestern University. p. 10.
- Steinhart, Edward I. (1977). Conflict and Collaboration: The Kingdoms of Western Uganda, 1890–1907. Princeton University Press. doi:10.2307/j.ctvd58rhp.1. ISBN 978-0-691-61559-2. JSTOR j.ctvd58rhp.
- Williams, Leon Norman (1993). Encyclopaedia of Rare and Famous Stamps volume 1 (1st ed.). pp. 289–291.
- Wilson, George. "London, England, Church of England Marriages and Banns, 1754–1938". Ancestry.com. Ancestry.com Operations, Inc.
- Wilson, George (18 February 1944). "Obituary". Journal of the Royal Society of Arts. 92 (4659): 155. JSTOR 41361793.
- Wilson, George (1907). "The Progress of Uganda". Journal of the Royal African Society. 6 (22): 113–135. ISSN 0368-4016. JSTOR 714528.
- Handbook for East Africa, Uganda & Zanzibar. Printed at the Government printing Press. 1906. p. 204.
- Kasule, Joseph (2022). Islam in Uganda: The Muslim Minority, Nationalism & Political Power. Boydell & Brewer. p. 84. ISBN 978-1-84701-243-2.
- Lugard, Sir Frederick Dealtry (1959). The Diaries of Lord Lugard volume 4. Northwestern University Press. p. 423.
- Wilson, George (1904). Notes for travellers to Uganda. The University of Manchester, The John Rylands University Library Press. p. 28. JSTOR 60230112.
- Who's who. A. & C. Black. 1901. p. 1204.
- Debrett, John (1931). Debrett's Peerage, Baronetage, Knightage, and Companionage. Dean & Son, limited. p. 2219.
- Johnston, Harry (1904). An Attempt to Give Some Description of the Physical Geography, Botany, Zoology, Anthropology, Languages and History of the Territories Under British Protection in East Central Africa, Between the Congo Free State and the Rift Valley and Between the First Degree of South Latitude and the Fifth Degree of North Latitude: Volume 1. Hutchinson & Company. p. 255. OCLC 3224745.
- The Handbook of Uganda By Editor Henry Richard Wallis. government of the Uganda protectorate. 1913. p. 74.
- "When sleeping sickness epidemic killed 250,000 Ugandans". New Vision. Daily Monitor. 19 July 2020.
- The Diaries of Lord Lugard: East Africa, December 1890 to December 1891. Faber & Faber. 1959. p. 242.
- The Diaries of Lord Lugard: East Africa, November, 1889 to December, 1890.- v.2. East Africa, December, 1890 to December, 1891.- v.3. East Africa, January 1892 to August 1892.- v.4. Nigeria, 1894-5 and 1896 by Sir Frederick Dealtry Lugard, Dame Margery Freda Perham. Northwestern University Press. 1959. p. 227.
- A History of the Kikuyu, 1500–1900 By Godfrey Muriuki. Oxford University Press. 1974. p. 143. ISBN 978-0-19-572314-4.
- History of Resistance in Kenya. Mau Mau Research Centre. 2019. p. 7. Archived from the original on 15 September 2022.
- Gregory, J. W. (1896). The Great Rift Valley – Being the Narrative of a Journey to Mount Kenya and Lake Baringo with Some Account of the Geology, Natural History, Anthropology and Future Prospects of British East Africa by John Walter Gregory. J. Murray. pp. 72–73. doi:10.5962/bhl.title.12499.
- "11". Passionate Imperialists By Rory O'Grady. Conrad Press. 2018. ISBN 9781912924158.
- Lugard: The years of adventure, 1858–1898 By Margery Freda Perham. Collins. 1960. p. 193. doi:10.2307/1156638. JSTOR 1156638. S2CID 143977216.
- Permanent Way by Mervyn F. Hill. Collins. 1961. p. 40.
- Wamagatta, Evanson N. (2009). The Presbyterian Church of East Africa: 1895–1946. Peter Lang. p. 12. ISBN 9781433105968.
- Makong’o, Julius (2009). History and Government Form 2. East African Publishers. p. 53. ISBN 9781433105968.
- Wood, Henry Trueman; Heron, J. S. (22 November 1907). "One-Hundred-and-Fifty-Fourth Session, 1907–8". Journal of the Royal Society of Arts. 56 (2870): 17. JSTOR 41336002.
- Twaddle, Michael (1993). Kakungulu & the creation of Uganda, 1868–1928. James Currey. p. 107. doi:10.1017/S0021853700026864. S2CID 162193848.
- Okoth, Assa (2006). A History of Africa: African societies and the establishment of colonial rule, 1800–1915. East African Educational Publishers. p. 134.
- Leslie William White, William Ernest Frank Ward (2006). East Africa: A Century of Change 1870–1970. Africana Publishing Corporation. p. 74.
- Murray-Brown, Jeremy (1973). Kenyatta. Africana Publishing Corporation. p. 30. OCLC 591167.
- Leakey, Louis (1952). Mau Mau and the Kikuyu. Taylor & Francis. pp. 57–58.
- Somerville, Keith (2019). Ivory: Power and Poaching in Africa. C. Hurst (Publishers) Limited. p. 78.
- Parliament. House of Commons, Great Britain (1907). Sessional papers. Inventory control record 1, vol. 54. Parliament, House of Commons. p. 392.
- Henry Robert Addison, William John Lawson, Charles Henry Oakes, Douglas Brooke Wheelton Sladen (1922). Who's who: volume 74. A. & C. Black. p. 2909.
- Burke, John (1914). Burke's Genealogical and Heraldic History of Peerage, Baronetage and Knightage. Burke's Peerage Limited. p. 2596.
- Debrett's Baronetage, Knightage, and Companionage. Dean & Son. 1921. p. 2014.
- Henry Robert Addison, William John Lawson, Charles Henry Oakes, Douglas Brooke Wheelton Sladen (1920). Who's who: volume 72. A. & C. Black. p. 2777.
- Debrett, John (1920). Debrett's Baronetage, Knightage, and Companionage part 2. Kelly's Directories. p. 1917.
- Women's who's who. Shaw Publishing Company. 1934. p. 400.
- Wason, J. Cathcart (1905). East Africa and Uganda; Or, Our Last Land. Griffiths. p. 53.
- Office, H.M. Stationery (29 July 1958). "The London Gazette". The Gazette. 3 (41460): 4775.
- brothers, Baily (1912). "An Annual Biographical Dictionary: with which is Incorporated 'Men and Women of the Time'". Who's Who: 2027. ISBN 9780713671643.
- "Uganda Journal". The Uganda Journal. 36–38. Uganda Society: 79. 1972.
- "Uganda Museum Occasional Paper". Uganda Museum (10): 1. 1966.
- McDermott, P. L. (1895). British East Africa, Or I B E A: A History of the Formation and Work of the Imperial British East Africa Company. Chapman and Hall. pp. 398–99.
- Reginald Vere-Hodge (b.1920–d.1964), Edward (1960). Imperial British East Africa Company. Macmillan. p. 76. OCLC 4908775.
- P. Barber, James (1968). Imperial Frontier: A Study of Relations Between the British and the Pastoral Tribes of North East Uganda. East African Publishing House. p. 55.
- Lubembe, Clement K. (1968). The Inside of Labour Movement in Kenya. Equatorial Publishers. p. 33. OCLC 119798.
- Green, Jeffrey (2012). Black Edwardians Black People in Britain 1901–1914. Taylor & Francis. p. 135. OCLC 925277710.
- Allen Rowe, John (1966). Revolution in Buganda 1856–1900 (Thesis). the University of Wisconsin – Madison. p. 222. OCLC 18556922.
- Twaddle, Michael (1988). "Decentralised violence and collaboration in early colonial Uganda". The Journal of Imperial and Commonwealth History. 16 (3): 76. doi:10.1080/03086538808582769.
- Sunderland, David (2018). Communications in Africa, 1880–1939. Taylor & Francis. p. 1.
- Lugard, Sir Frederick Dealtry (1893). The Rise of Our East African Empire Early Efforts in Nyasaland and Uganda, Volume 1. W. Blackwood and Sons. pp. 228–229.
- "Uganda Society". The Uganda Journal. 29–30: 31. 1965.
- "EAPH Studies". EAPH Historical Studies. 3. East African Publishing House: 55. 1968.
