= Mackinnon-Sclater road =

Road in Kenya

The Mackinnon-Sclater road was a 970 km (600 mi) ox cart track from Mombasa to Busia in Kenya started in 1890 by the British East Africa Company (IBEAC). It superseded earlier caravan routes used by slave traders and explorers of the interior.

The part of the road called the "Mackinnon road" linked Mombasa and Kibwezi. It was built by an Australian called George Wilson. It was named after and partly financed by Sir William Mackinnon, 1st Baronet a founder of the IBEAC who wanted to increase trade with Uganda. The road was “of the simplest kind, Road surface| unmetalled, and in fact, the roughest track along which a bullock-cart would go”

Captain Bertram Lutley Sclater of the Royal Engineers continued the road from Kibwezi to the Uganda border at Busia.

The road as a means of long distance travel fell into disuse between 1896 and 1901 after the Uganda Railway overtook it. Many of the cars later used in the interior were transported there by rail because the road journey was long, slow and difficult.

== See also ==
- Mackinnon Road
