= 1894 Birthday Honours =

Appointments by Queen Victoria to various orders and honours

The 1894 Birthday Honours were appointments by Queen Victoria to various orders and honours to reward and highlight good works by citizens of the British Empire. The appointments were made to celebrate the official birthday of The Queen, and were published in the London Gazette on 25 May 1894, and in The Times on 26 May 1894.

The recipients of honours are displayed here as they were styled before their new honour, and arranged by honour, with classes (Knight, Knight Grand Cross, etc.) and then divisions (Military, Civil, etc.) as appropriate.

== United Kingdom and British Empire ==
=== Privy Councillor ===
The Queen appointed the following to Her Majesty's Most Honourable Privy Council:

- Jacob Bright MP
- Sir Arthur Hayter Bt MP

=== Baronetcies ===
- James Reckitt.
- Weetman Dickinson Pearson
- Thomas Glen-Coats
- Samuel Montagu MP
- John Austin MP

=== Knight Bachelor ===
- Dr. John Charles Bucknill, one of the originators of the National Volunteer Force in 1852.
- Louis-Napoléon Casault, Senior Puisne Judge of the Superior Court of the Province of Quebec, in the Dominion of Canada.
- John Joseph Grinlinton, Member of the Legislative Council of the Island of Ceylon, Commissioner for that island at the recent Exhibition at Chicago.
- Francis Seymour Haden, President of the Royal Society of Painter Etchers.
- John Hutton, Chairman of the London County Council.
- Philip Manfield MP for Northampton.
- Jerom Murch, of Bath.
- Isaac Pitman, the originator of Pitman's system of shorthand.
- Thomas Wemyss Reid.
- The Hon. Arthur Renwick Commissioner for New South Wales at the recent Exhibition at Chicago, formerly Minister of Mines, Minister of Public Instruction, and now Member of the Legislative Council of that colony.
- James Alexander Russell, Lord Provost of Edinburgh.
- Thomas Robinson MP for Gloucester.
- The Hon. Frank Smith, Senator and Member of the Government of the Dominion of Canada.
- Dr. Thomas Grainger Stewart, Physician in Ordinary to the Queen in Scotland and Professor of Physic in the University of Edinburgh.
- Richard Tangye, of Birmingham.
- Thomas Thornton, Town Clerk of Dundee.
- George Williams, founder of the Young Men's Christian Association.

=== The Most Honourable Order of the Bath ===
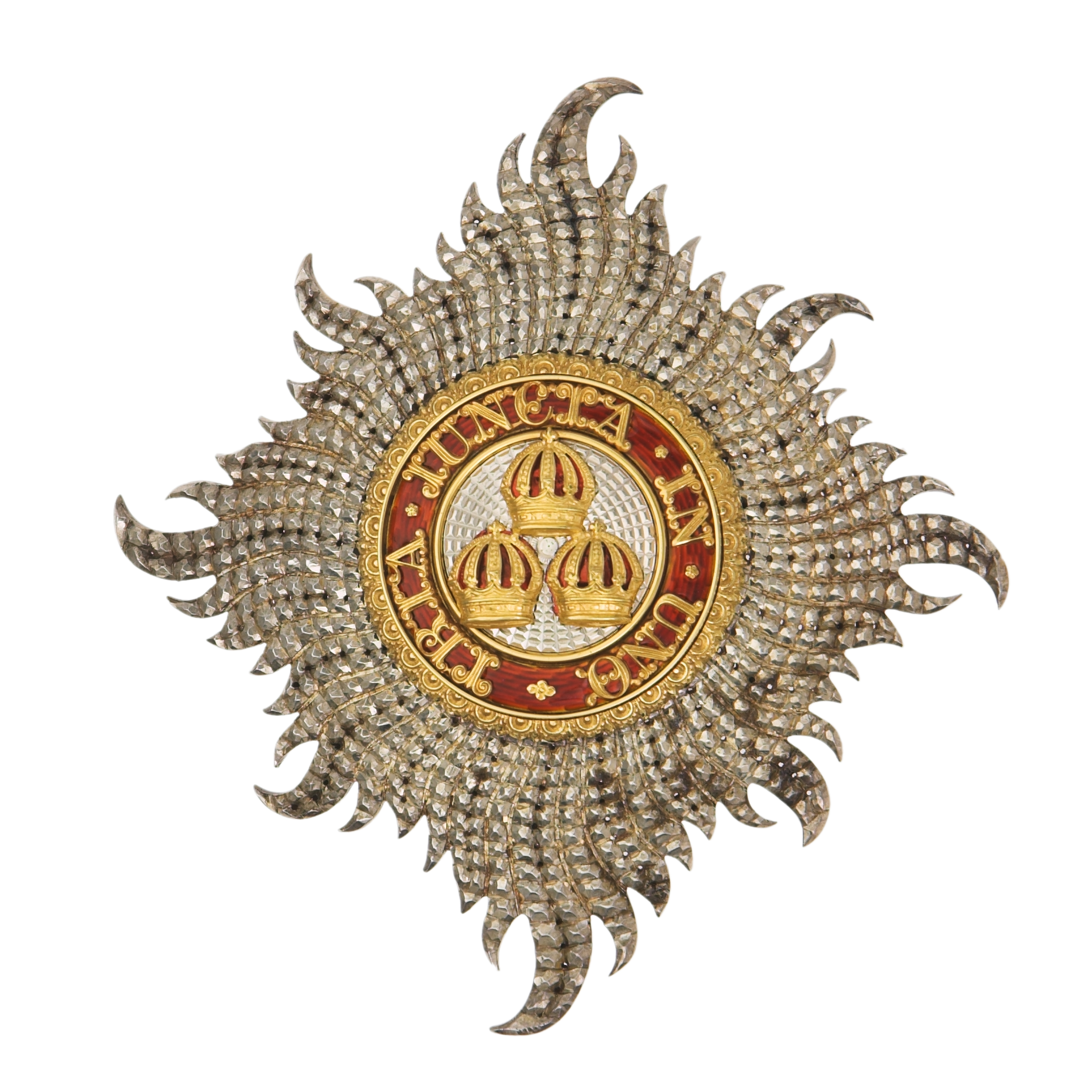
Civilian star of the Knight Grand Cross of the Order of the Bath

==== Knight Grand Cross of the Order of the Bath (GCB) ====
Military Division

- General Sir Robert Onesiphorus Bright KCB
- General Sir Robert Phayre KCB Indian Staff Corps.
- Honorary Major General Sir Charles Henry Palliser KCB retired full pay, late Indian Staff Corps.
- General Sir Charles George Arbuthnot KCB Royal Artillery.
- Lieutenant-General the Rt. Hon. Sir Redvers Henry Buller VC KCB Adjutant-General to the Forces.

==== Knight Commander of the Order of the Bath (KCB) ====
Military Division

- General James Frankfort Manners Browne CB Royal Engineers.
- Surgeon-General James Mouat VC CB late Army Medical Department, Honorary Surgeon to the Queen.
- Honorary Major-General James Mansfield Nuttall CB retired full pay, late Indian Staff Corps.
- General James Abbott CB Royal (late Bengal) Artillery.
- General Robert Cadell CB Royal (late Madras) Artillery.
- General Henry Hastings Affleck Wood CB Indian Staff Corps.
- Major-General Frederick William Edward Forestier-Walker CB CMG Commanding the Force in Egypt.
- Lieutenant-General Edward Newdigate Newdegate CB
- Lieutenant-General Henry Brackenbury CB Royal Artillery, Ordinary Member of the Council of the Governor-General of India.
- Honorary Major-General Robert John Hughes CB
- Rear-Admiral John Arbuthnot Fisher CB Controller of the Navy.
- Colonel William Green CB
- Lieutenant-General Robert John Hay CB Royal Artillery, Director of Artillery.

Civil Division

- Edward Walter Hamilton CB Assistant Secretary to the Treasury.
- Augustus Wollaston Franks CB Keeper, Department of British and Mediaeval Antiquities and Ethnography, British Museum.

==== Companion of the Order of the Bath (CB) ====
Military Division

- Deputy Surgeon-General William George Nicholas Manley VC late Army Medical Department.
- Colonel Edward Lutwyche England.
- Lieutenant-Colonel and Colonel Horace Moule Evans, Indian Staff Corps.
- Lieutenant-Colonel and Colonel Francis James Caldecott, Royal (late Bombay) Artillery, Indian Ordnance Department.
- Lieutenant-Colonel and Colonel Francis Eddowes Hastings, Indian Army.
- Lieutenant-Colonel and Colonel Charles McInroy, Indian Staff Corps.
- Lieutenant-Colonel and Colonel Francis William Ward, Royal (late Bengal) Artillery, Colonel on Staff (for Royal Artillery), Bengal.
- Colonel John Jopp, Indian Staff Corps, Commanding a Second Class District in India.
- Colonel (temporary Major-General) Hugh Thomas Jones-Vaughan, Colonel on the Staff Commanding the Troops in the Straits Settlements.
- Lieutenant-Colonel and Brevet Colonel Edmund Henry Eyre, Indian Staff Corps, Quartermaster-General, Madras.
- Colonel William Freeman Kelly.
- Colonel Charles More Stockley, Regimental District.
- Lieutenant-Colonel and Colonel the Hon. George Hugh Gough, 14th Hussars.
- Lieutenant-Colonel and Brevet Colonel John Henry Barnard CMG Aide-de-Camp to the Queen.
- Lieutenant-Colonel and Brevet Colonel Thomas Hungerford Holdich, Royal Engineers.
- Colonel Edward Thomas Henry Hutton, Aide-de-Camp to the Queen, Commandant Colonial Forces, New South Wales.
- Veterinary Lieutenant-Colonel William B. Walters, late Army Veterinary Department.
- Lieutenant-Colonel Archibald Broadfoot, Royal Artillery.

The following appointments to the Most Honourable Order of the Bath given in recognition of the services in the recent operations against Fodey Silah in Combo on the Gambia:

- Major and Brevet Lieutenant-Colonel Arthur Domville Corbet, Royal Marine Light Infantry.
- Fleet Surgeon William Rogerson White.

Civil Division

- Richard Davis Awdry, Assistant Secretary to the Admiralty.
- The Hon. Hamilton John Agmondesham Cuffe, Assistant Solicitor to the Treasury.
- Frederic Fitzjames Cullinan, Principal Clerk in the Chief Secretary's Office, Dublin Castle.
- Daniel Robert Fearon, Secretary to the Charity Commissioners.
- Sir George Grove Kt Director of the Royal College of Music.
- Andrew Charles Howard, Assistant Commissioner of Metropolitan Police.
- Colonel Herbert Locock, Royal Engineers, Deputy Inspector-General of Fortifications, War Office.
- Alfred Milner, Chairman of the Board of Inland Revenue.
- Walter Murton, Solicitor to the Board of Trade.
- Edmund Constantine Henry Phipps, a Minister Plenipotentiary in Her Majesty's Diplomatic Service, Secretary to Her Majesty's Embassy at Paris.
- The Reverend Thomas Wetherhead Sharpe, Senior Chief Inspector of Schools, Education Department.

=== The Most Exalted Order of the Star of India ===
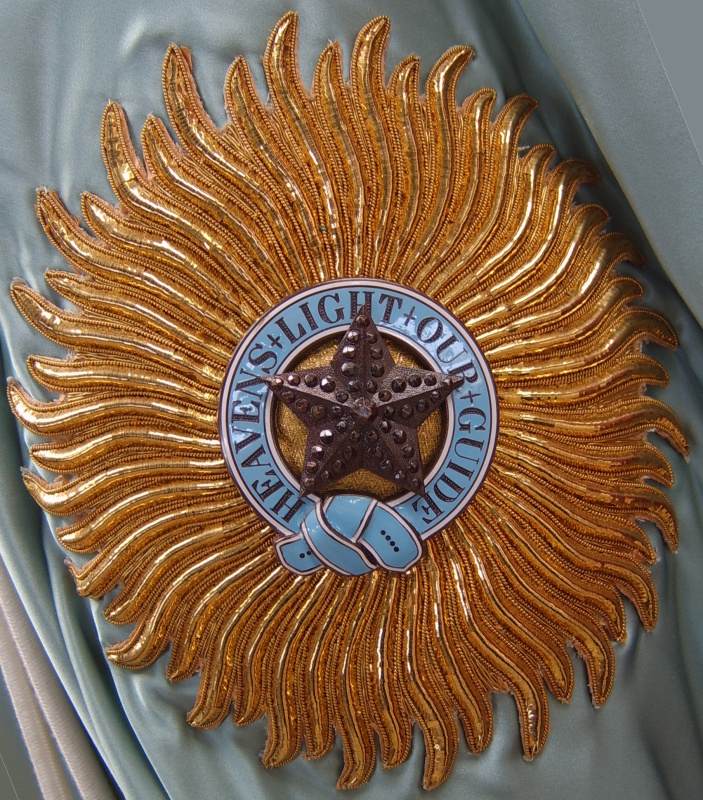
Star of a Knight Grand Commander of the Most Exalted Order of the Star of India.

==== Knight Commander (KCSI) ====
- Major General Oliver Richardson Newmarch CSI Military Secretary at the India Office.

==== Companion (CSI) ====
- Major-General Robert Charles Boileau Pemberton, Royal Engineers.
- Arthur Charles Trevor, Indian Civil Service, Member of Council, Bombay.

=== The Most Distinguished Order of Saint Michael and Saint George ===
Star of the Order of Saint Michael and Saint George.

==== Knight Grand Cross of the Order of St Michael and St George (GCMG) ====
- The Hon. Sir Henry Ayers KCMG five times Premier of South Australia, and subsequently for many years President of the Legislative Council of that Colony.

==== Knight Commander of the Order of St Michael and St George (KCMG) ====
- Lieutenant-General Arthur James Lyon Fremantle CB Governor and Commander-in-Chief of the Island of Malta.
- The Hon. James Brown Patterson, Premier and Chief Secretary of the Colony of Victoria.
- The Hon. John Lackey, President of the Legislative Council of the Colony of New South Wales.
- George Thomas Michael O'Brien CMG Colonial Secretary of the Colony of Hong Kong.
- Edwyn Sandys Dawes, for services in connection with the Colony of Queensland, and in developing steam communication between England and certain of Her Majesty's Colonial Possessions.

Honorary Knight Commander

- William Cornelius Van Horne, President of the Canadian Pacific Railway Company.

==== Companion of the Order of St Michael and St George (CMG) ====
- Charles-Eugène Boucher de Boucherville, Senator of the Dominion of Canada.
- Colonel Frederick Cardew, now Administering the Government of the Colony of Sierra Leone, and lately Acting Resident Commissioner in Zululand.
- Charles Bletterman Elliott General Manager of Railways of the Cape of Good Hope.
- Capt. Hamilton John Goold-Adams, Commandant of the British Bechuanaland Border Police.
- Robert Grieve Surgeon-General of the Colony of British Guiana.
- Emanuel Charles Poupinel de Valencé, President of the Royal Society of Arts and Sciences of Mauritius, and Vice-President of the General Board of Health in that Colony.

=== The Most Eminent Order of the Indian Empire ===
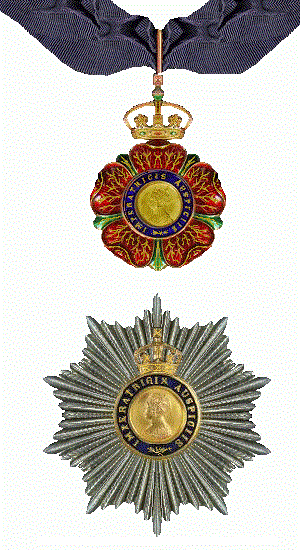
Riband, badge and star of the Knight Grand Commander of the Order of the Indian Empire

==== Companion (CIE) ====
- Colonel Thomas Hungerford Holdich, Royal Engineers, Superintendent, Survey Department.
- His Highness Mir Hasan Ali Khan.
- Colonel Frank William Chatterton, Commandant Administrative Battalion, Calcutta Volunteers, and Honorary Aide-de-Camp to the Viceroy of India.
- George Abraham Grierson, Indian Civil Service.
- Francis Joseph Edward Spring, Joint Secretary to Government, Public Works Department, Railway Branch, Bombay.
- Edwin Welsh Kellner, Accountant-General, Punjab.
- Major Ivar Macivor, Indian Staff Corps
- Cowasjee Dinshaw, of Aden
- Thomas Blaney, President of the Municipal Corporation, Bombay.
- Graham Anderson.
- Tikka Raghunath Singh, of Bashahr.
- Rao Bahadur Sri Ram Bhikaji Jatar.

==== Distinguished Service Order (DSO) ====
- Lieutenant and Commander Herbert Goodenough King-Hall RN
- Surgeon Walter Bowden RN
