= Mombasan rupee =

The Mombasan Rupee is British East African Protectorate adopted Rupee as a denomination on the coins issued by Imperial British East Africa Company, which was based in Bombay in 1888 was given a charter by Queen Victoria to trade in East Africa. Indian commercial laws, Insolvency acts, the Stamp, Designs were adopted and the Indian Rupee was the East African currency until 1920.

Mombasa rupee made of 0.917 pure silver and weighs around 11.66 grams.
