= Horace Evans =

Horace Evans may refer to:

- Horace Evans, 1st Baron Evans, Welsh physician
- Sir Horace Moule Evans, Indian Army officer
