= Mackinnon Road =

Town in Kenya

Coordinates: 3°44′S 39°03′E

Mackinnon Road is a town in Kwale County, Kenya, with a population of around 8000 in 1999, located between Mombasa and Voi. Just a few kilometers from Taru.

== History ==
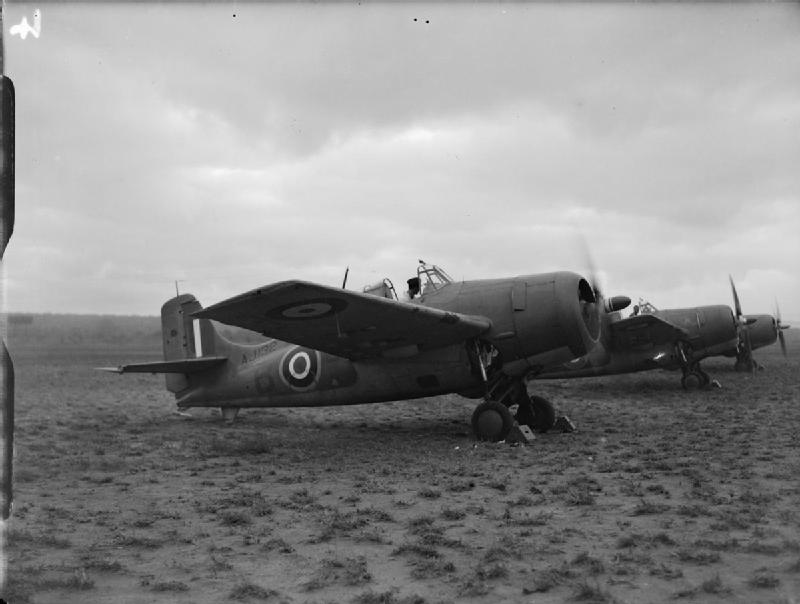
Grumman Martlet at Mackinnon Road

In World War II a Fleet Air Arm airfield was established at Mackinnon Road after the British Eastern Fleet retreated to Mombasa following the Indian Ocean raid. Airfields at Voi and Port Reitz Airport were also used to disperse the fleet's carrier aircraft in case of attack by the aircraft carriers of the Imperial Japanese Navy. These airfields were administered by the Royal Navy shore establishment HMS Kipanga II ("Kipanga" is Swahili language for "goshawk").

Between 1947 and 1950 Mackinnon Road was the site of a large British engineering and Ordnance Depot designed to hold 200,000 tons of military stores. The British had anticipated the loss of military bases in Egypt due to a rise in nationalism in that country and decided to create another base that was able to serve their military needs in the western Indian Ocean. The plan was abandoned and the base became a detention camp for Mau Mau suspects until 1955.

== Transport ==
It has a station on the railway between Mombasa and Nairobi and was probably named because it was a junction of the Uganda Railway and the Mackinnon ox cart road 90 km (56 mi) outside Mombasa. Construction of the road was started in 1890 by George Wilson of the British East Africa Company and the workforce of native men for the Scottish Industrial mission and the railway in 1896 by the British colonial administration. The road fell into disuse as the railway overtook it.

== Main sights ==
There is a mosque which houses the tomb of Seyyid Baghali, a Punjabi foreman at the time of the building of the railway who was renowned for his strength. Originally there was a simple grave at the site, but after travellers attributed their safe journeys to visiting the grave, a mosque was built.

== See also ==
- Mackinnon-Sclater road
