= Keil School =

Scottish private school (1925-2000)

Coordinates: 55.940°N 4.583°W

Keil School was a school in Dumbarton, Scotland founded by the MacKinnon-MacNeil trust created by a legacy from the Victorian entrepreneur and colonialist, Sir William Mackinnon. After opening as a technical college in 1915 it later became an independent school for boys, then became co-educational before closing in 2000.

== History ==
Kintyre Technical College opened with a roll of 18 boys on 29 November 1915 at Keil House, Southend, near Campbeltown in Argyll. In the winter of 1924 a fire destroyed the original building in Southend. The school was relocated to Helenslee, Dumbarton and opened as Keil School in 1925. The school took a lease on Helenslee House, a 50-acre (20 ha) site on the banks of the River Clyde. Helenslee House was originally the property of the shipbuilding family Dennys of Dumbarton.

In 1941, due to the school's high vulnerability during the Clydeside Blitz, including the destruction of nearby industrial centres such as Clydebank (only 16 buildings were left undamaged) and conflagrations at the Bowling Oil Refinery and the Tate & Lyle Sugar Refinery at Greenock, the school had to be evacuated and relocated in the safer surroundings of Balinakill House, Kintyre for the duration of the war.

Keil School had a school roll of 100 in 1958. As an independent secondary school, with boarding and day pupils, it later had around 200 pupils. It was an all-boys school up until 1978, when it became co-educational. By 1989 it became fully co-educational.

In 1983, with 73 boarding and 48 day pupils enrolled, the school's finances were in a poor position and a fundraising campaign was needed for it to stay open. In 2000 there were 33 teaching staff. It was viewed by some as one of Scotland's leading fee-paying schools. In 2000 the Mackinnon Macneill Trust announced that the school would close, facing a drop in income with the end of the Assisted Places Scheme and less demand for boarding places. Keil School closed in July 2000. At its closure, it had 54 boarders and 120 day pupils.

As of 2016 plans for a housing development on the site have been lodged.

The school was used as a set in an episode of the TV Detective show Taggart which aired in 1988. Season 14 Episode 2 entitled 'Out of Bounds' features parts of the school building and Keil School uniforms (sports uniforms and blazers, although in the latter the school crest had been replaced with that of the fictional school in the episode).

== Motto ==
The school motto was "Persevere in Hope".

== Notable former pupils ==
- Alexander Douglas-Hamilton, 16th Duke of Hamilton
- Ken W. MacDonald, Scottish businessman
- Joe Thomson, former Regius Professor of Law at the University of Glasgow and Scottish Law Commissioner
- David Brown, former Wardlaw Professor of Theology, Aesthetics and Culture at St Mary's College, University of St Andrews, attended 1960–66
