= Ken W. MacDonald =

Scottish businessman (born 1959)

Kenneth MacDonald
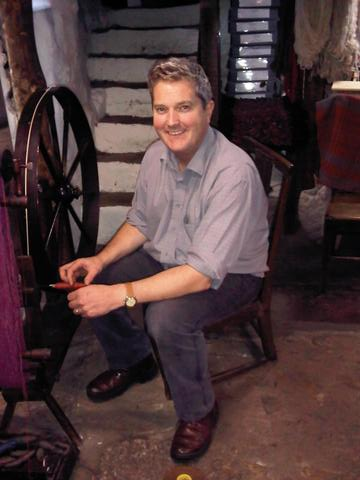
- MacDonald at Sma' Shotts Cottage, Paisley
- Born: 21 February 1959 (age 67); Paisley, Scotland
- Occupations: Kiltmaker and Tartan Designer
- Years active: 1975–present
- Spouse: Louise MacDonald (m. 1982)
- Website: http://www.kiltmakers.com http://www.kiltsforhire.com http://www.americannationaltartan.com

Kenneth W. MacDonald (born 21 February 1959) is a Scottish businessman, best known for his work within the Scottish tartan industry as owner of Houston Traditional Kiltmakers, Paisley. He currently serves as a Vice Chairman of the Scottish Tartans Authority and Deacon of the Incorporation of Weavers of Glasgow.

== Early life ==
Ken MacDonald was born on 21 February 1959 in Paisley to Hugh Lawson MacDonald and Eileen Douglas MacDonald (née Houston). MacDonald was educated at Dardenne Preparatory School, Kilmacolm and then Keil School, Dumbarton before, at the age of 16, joining the family business Wm Houston Gentlemen’s Outfitters now known as Houston Traditional Kiltmakers in Paisley, Scotland. Houston Kiltmakers are world-renowned as a leading authority of all Scottish highland wear and etiquette.

== Business career ==
W M Houston Gentlemen’s Outfitters was founded in 1909 by Mr William Houston of Paisley, the grandfather of Ken. The business was originally purchased by the Houston family in 1924 with only 2 shillings and sixpence in the till. The Shop operated for over 50 years as a traditional gentlemen’s outfitter, providing gentlemen of the day with pinstripe suits and bowler hats. Since then, the Houston and then MacDonald families have evolved and grown the business in Paisley, where the business is located.

After entering the family business, in 1975, MacDonald built up its reputation as a leading retailer of quality menswear. In 1986 he became Scottish Chairman of the Menswear Association of Britain, In 1988 he was responsible for designing the Glasgow Garden Festival staff uniform and retailed on the festival site. MacDonald later incorporated the uniform colours of grey, yellow and red into the Glasgow's Miles Better tartan. Kilts in this tartan were made for Prince William and Prince Harry and presented by him to Charles, Prince of Wales.

Other noted tartans designed by MacDonald include the Bute Heather tartan collection which was registered with the Scottish Register of Tartans in 2004. The range includes the variations on Bute Heather colours, all woven on the Isle of Bute.

MacDonald famously designed the American National Tartan which was presented to George W. Bush from the people of Scotland to the people of America to commemorate Tartan day.

Aside from his role in the highland wear industry, MacDonald is a Director of Paisley First (Business Improvement District), and past member of the Paisley Vision Board whose remit was to lead the regeneration of Paisley town centre. He is serving his second term as Deacon of the Incorporation of Weavers Glasgow, a role which he took up in November 2014

Today Ken MacDonald runs the business, the 3rd generation of the MacDonald family to operate the business. Houston’s handmade kilts are all produced in Scotland and shipped around the world to the USA, Japan, Indian and Australia as well as servicing the domestic market in Scotland, the UK and Europe.
