= Edwyn Sandys Dawes =

British businessman (1838–1903)

Sir Edwyn Sandys Dawes KCMG
- Born: 27 January 1838
- Died: 21 December 1903 (aged 65); Tenerife
- Burial place: Hernhill, Kent
- Education: King Edward's Grammar School
- Occupations: Businessman and ship-owner
- Children: 5 sons and 5 daughters

Sir Edwyn Sandys Dawes (27 January 1838 – 21 December 1903) was a British merchant and ship-owner who established substantial business interests in Asia and Australasia during the second half of the 19th century.

== Early life and education ==
Dawes was born on 27 January 1838, the second son of Rev. Charles Dawes of Hernhill, Kent and his wife Mary (née Sherwood). From 1851, he was educated at King Edward's Grammar School, in Birmingham.

== Career ==
After leaving school, Dawes joined the Peninsular & Oriental Steam Navigation Company (P&O). From 1854 to 1856 during the Crimean War, he was stationed in Crimea with the company assisting with the war effort, and rose to the rank of chief officer. From 1856 to 1865, he worked in India and China.

While in India, Dawes met William Mackinnon, a leading Indian merchant and head of the agency house of Mackinnon, Mackenzie & Co, Calcutta, later led by James MacKay, 1st earl of Inchscape, who employed him as the firm's agent in Bombay When his wife became ill, he returned to London and established Gray, Dawes, and Co with Mackinnon's nephew, Archibald Grey, which served as the London agency for Mackinnon's business.

Described as East India merchants, shipowners, and insurance agents, Dawes took over the leadership of Gray, Dawes, and Co on the death of Gray, and under his stewardship the firm grew to become one of the leading agency businesses in London. He established branches of the firm in the Persian Gulf at Bushehr (1866), and at Zanzibar (1873). From 1880, he extended his business interests into Australia and New Zealand, becoming chairman of Australasian United Steam Navigation Company, and the leading shipping firm of J. B. Westray & Co, New Zealand, and by 1900 had numerous directorships, including in British India Steam Navigation Company, Madras and Southern Mahratta Railway, Queensland National Bank, and Suez Canal Company.

In 1894, he was knighted for "services in connection with the Colony of Queensland, and in developing steam communication between England and certain of Her Majesty's Colonial Possessions".

== Personal life and death ==
Dawes married Lucy Bagnall in 1859. They had 10 children; five sons and five daughters.

Dawes died on 21 December 1903, aged 65, at the Grand Hotel, Puerto, in Tenerife, where he had gone to recover from pulmonary tuberculosis. He is buried at Hernhill church, in Kent.

== Honours ==
Dawes was created Knight Commander of the Order of St Michael and St George (KCMG) in the 1894 Birthday Honours.
