= Balinakill House =

Building in Argyll and Bute, Scotland

Coordinates: 55°44′50″N 5°33′2″W

Balinakill House is a Victorian manor house to the east of the village of Clachan, Kintyre, Argyll and Bute, Scotland.

The house was built by Sir William Mackinnon, 1st Baronet of Strathaird and Loup, founder of the British India Steam Navigation Company, who purchased the estates of Balinakill and Loup in 1867. The house was completed in 1893.

In 1941, the Keil School, Dumbarton, was moved to Balinakill House, due to the bombing attacks on the Glasgow area during World War II, and utilised the facilities for the duration of the war.

Known as Balinakill Country House, it is currently available for exclusive use and holiday lets, and is protected as a category C listed building.

== Bibliography ==
- Kintyre and Knapdale Parishes - Groome's Gazetteer - (1896 Edition)
