= Waiyaki Wa Hinga =

Son of Kumale ole Lemotaka

Waiyaki Wa Hinga was the son of Kumale ole Lemotaka, a Maasai whose family sought refuge in Gatundu where he was hosted by the Gatheca's family, most likely during the Lloikop wars. Due to his Maasai background, Kumale ole Lemotaka was given the name Hinga by the Kikuyu, meaning dissembler, a name given to those who lived amongst Kikuyus but spoke the Maa language or had lived among Maasais before.

Waiyaki Wa Hinga was the owner of a large Agikuyu fort at the frontier of Kikuyu country. Upon encountering the Imperial British East Africa Company, he was genuinely interested in establishing and cementing ties with them. We see this when Waiyaki welcomes Frederick Lugard, and gives him land so that he can set-up a fort. However, there was a mis-understanding right from the very beginning on which position Waiyaki held in Kikuyu society. British officials understood him to be the "Paramount Chiefs of the Agikuyu". However, Kikuyus did not have paramount chiefs in their political system; Waiyaki was a Kikuyu Mũthamaki (singular) out of the many influential Athamaki (plural). In Kikuyu society, a Mũthamaki was a spokesman, the chairman of a territorial unit and leader of his age-set. Athamaki were the first or leading personalities among peers; their role was highly controlled by their fellow peers. Given this, Waiyaki Wa Hinga did not hold the highest position amongst Kabete Kikuyus.

In 1892, a quarrel between him and Purkiss led to Waiyaki's death. This occurred after an expedition to punish Kikuyus of Githinguri for killing Maktubu, a worker of the Imperial British East Africa Company, fails. Purkiss was angry with Waiyaki as it was him who warned the community. Waiyaki feared his cattle would be impounded together with those of the culprits who had murdered Maktubu. A row flared between him and Purkiss. Waiyaki was then wounded in the head with his own sword, which he had drawn to attack Purkiss with. Due to this, Waiyaki was taken to Mombasa to be tried under IBEACo. Unfortunately, he never reached Mombasa: He was killed and was buried at Kibwezi en route to the Kenyan coast. Other accounts hold that he was actually buried alive after provoking the British transporting him. Waiyaki Way in central Nairobi is reportedly named after him.
