= Robert Mackenzie (trader) =

Scottish trader and businessman (died 1853)

Robert Mackenzie (died 15 May 1853) was a trader and co-founder of the Mackinnon Mackenzie Company, now known as Inchcape plc.

== Career ==
Born in Campbeltown in Argyll, Robert Mackenzie went out to Calcutta in India where, in 1836, he set up an oil goods import and export business and also became involved in the coasting trade around the Bay of Bengal.

In 1847, together with William Mackinnon, he co-founded the Mackinnon Mackenzie Company which went on to become a major trading house, shipping goods from India to the United Kingdom. Mackenzie chose Ghazipur as the base for his own activities.

In 1853 Mackenzie set out for Australia to seek out trading opportunities for the McKinnon Mackenzie Company. He died on board the SS Monumental City which was shipwrecked off the coast of Victoria, near Gabo Island on 15 May 1853.
