= Harry George Galt =

British colonial official in Uganda (1872–1905)

Sub-commissioner western Uganda Province
- In office 1904 – 19 May 1905

Personal details
- Born: 28 January 1872 Emsworth, Hampshire, UK
- Died: 19 May 1905 (aged 33) Ibanda, Uganda

Harry George Galt, sometimes called Harry St. George Galt, was a British subcommissioner of the Western Province of Uganda, a British protectorate. He was killed in Ibanda.

== Background ==
Galt was born on 28 January 1872 in Emsworth in Hampshire in Great Britain to Edwin Galt JP and Marion Galt. He attended Lancing College.

== Official work and death ==
Being posted to the British colony of Uganda, he was first appointed as the tax collector of the Ankole Sub-region. He was later appointed as the sub-commissioner of the Western Uganda province. On 19 May 1905, as a newly appointed officer, Galt allegedly forced the local people to carry him on their heads from Fort Portal to Ibanda, refusing to let them rest.

The locals carried him up to Katooma, 3 km from Ibanda, before the Kagongo Catholic Church where he stopped and rested in a government house. When the local people started talking about his cruelty, a native man named Rutaraka threw a spear at Galt, who was sitting in the government house compound. The missile struck Galt in the chest and he died after a short time.

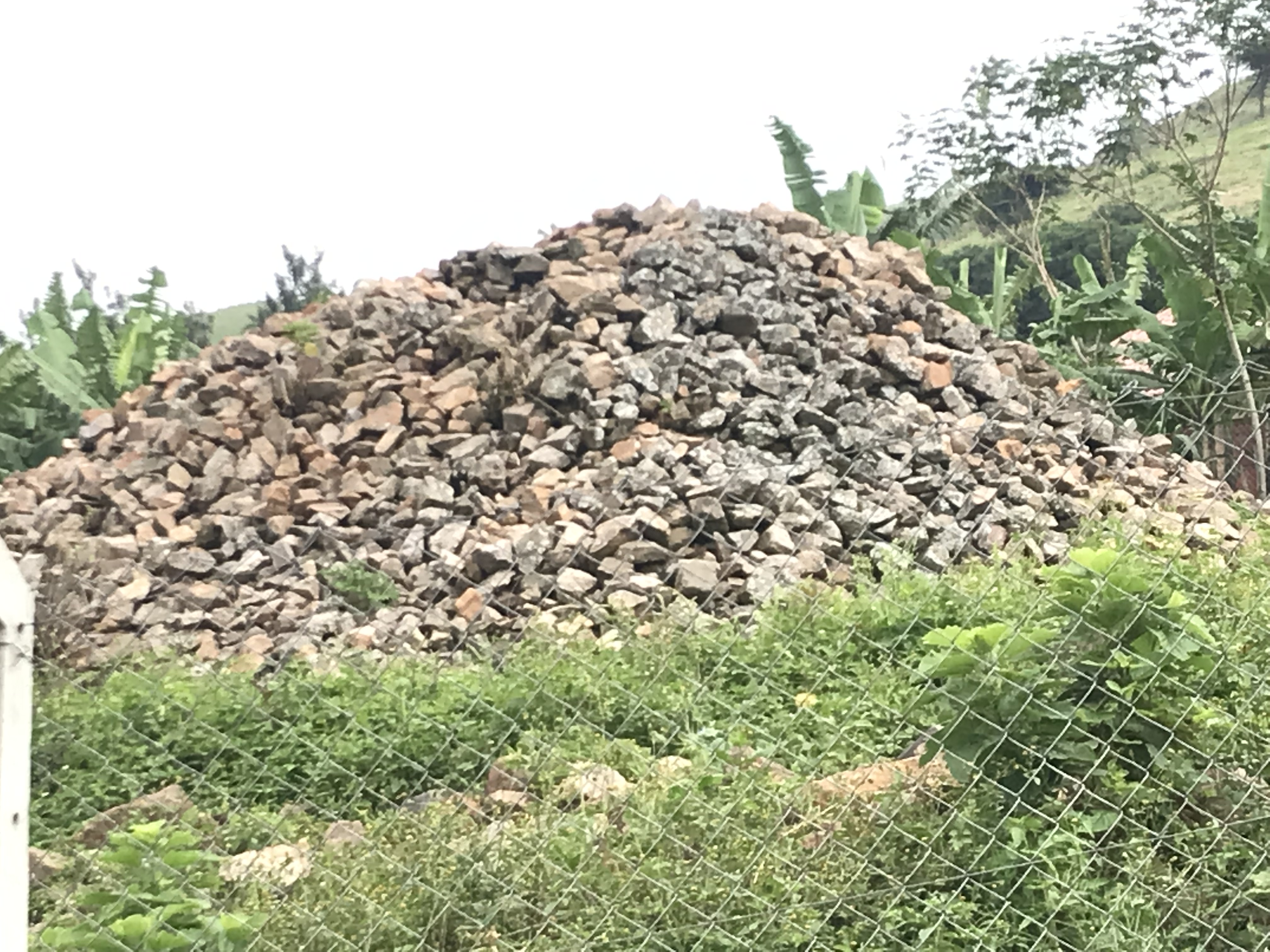
Galt Memorial in Uganda

The colonial government investigated the cause of Galt's death. They thought it was politically motivated and sentenced two Ankole chiefs to the death penalty which was later cancelled on appeal by the British East African Court. Rutaraka was later found dead as he committed suicide by hanging himself, fearing what would follow. Galt's body was taken for burial and the colonial government punished the natives by making them pile stones to cover the blood of Galt. They piled stones making a pyramid-like feature 5 m long and 3 m high which still stands as of 2015.

A street in Mbarara was named after him: Galt Road which starts on Stanley Road on Booma Hill opposite the public library
