= Horace Moule Evans =

Indian army officer (1841–1923)

Sir Horace Moule Evans
- Born: 8 December 1841; Stoke Newington, Middlesex, England
- Died: 28 July 1923 (aged 81); Steyning, Sussex, England
- Military career
- Allegiance: United Kingdom
- Branch: British Indian Army
- Rank: General
- Commands: Allahabad District; Rohilcund District
- Awards: Knight Commander of the Order of the Bath

General Sir Horace Moule Evans KCB (8 December 1841 – 28 July 1923) was an Indian Army officer.

== Military career ==
As a junior officer Evans served in the 104th Regiment of Foot (Bengal Fusiliers) and then became Deputy Assistant Adjutant General of the Bengal Army. He went on to be General Officer Commanding Allahabad District in India in 1895 and General Officer Commanding Rohilcund District in 1896. He was promoted to full general on his retirement in November 1901. He was also Colonel of the 8 Gorkha Rifles.

Evans died in 1923 and was buried at St Andrew and St Cuthman Churchyard in Steyning, West Sussex.
