= Sir William Mackinnon, 1st Baronet =

Scottish businessman

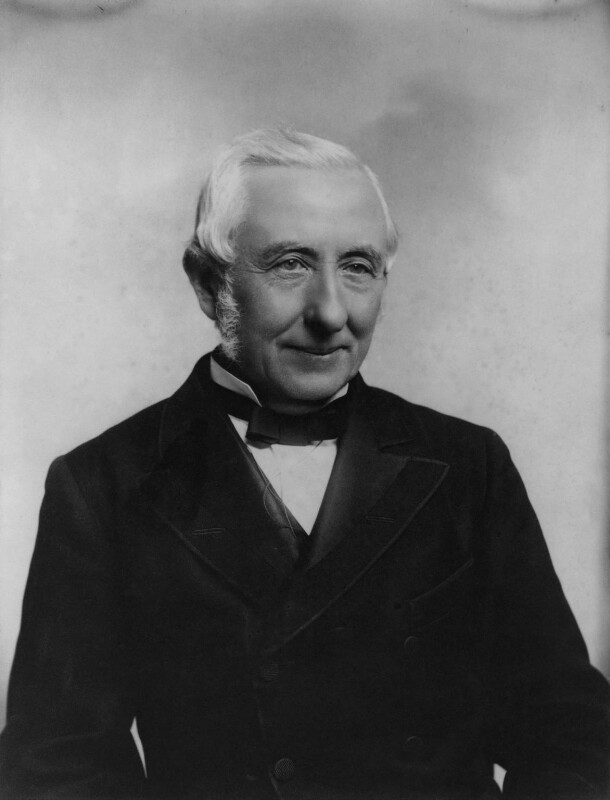
- Born: 13 March 1823; Campbeltown, Scotland, United Kingdom
- Died: 22 June 1893 (aged 70); London, England, United Kingdom
- Occupation: Businessman
- Known for: British India Steam Navigation Company; Imperial British East Africa Company
- Spouse: Janet Colquhoun (m. 1856)

Sir William Mackinnon, 1st Baronet, CIE, FRSGS (23 March 1823 – 22 June 1893) was a Scottish ship-owner and businessman who built up substantial commercial interests in India and East Africa. He established the British-India Steam Navigation Company and the Imperial British East Africa Company.

== Biography ==
=== Early life ===
He was born in Campbeltown, Argyll, and after starting in the grocery trade there, went to Glasgow and worked for a merchant who had Asian trading interests.

=== Career ===
Mackinnon went to India in 1847 and joined an old schoolfriend, Robert Mackenzie, in the coasting trade, carrying merchandise from port to port around the Bay of Bengal. Together they formed the firm of Mackinnon Mackenzie & Co and Mackinnon chose to make Cossipore the base for his own activities.

In 1856, he founded the shipping company Calcutta and Burma Steam Navigation Company, which would become British India Steam Navigation Company in 1862. It grew into a huge business trading round the coasts of the Indian Ocean, extending its operations to Burma, the Persian Gulf and the east coast of Africa, from Aden to Zanzibar.

In 1865 he established Gray, Dawes and Company as a merchant partnership for his nephew Archibald Gray and Edwyn Sandys Dawes (1838–1903), knighted in 1894. The company, founded as a shipping and insurance agency in the City of London, went through several reorganizations and ownership changes, obtaining recognition as a merchant bank in 1915, becoming fully fledged as Gray Dawes Bank in 1973 (sold in 1983), and now known as Gray Dawes Group Ltd.

In 1888, Mackinnon founded the Imperial British East Africa Company and became its Chairman. The company, supported by the United Kingdom government as a means of establishing British influence in the region, was committed to eliminating the slave trade, prohibiting trade monopoly, and equal treatment for all nations. The company would later be taken over by the British government and became the East Africa Protectorate.

On 15 July 1889, Mackinnon was made 1st Baronet of Strathaird and Loup.

Mackinnon promoted Henry Morton Stanley's Emin Pasha Relief Expedition, first enlisting Stanley, then writing to government ministers including Lord Iddesleigh, the Foreign Secretary, and enlisting friends to form a committee which could oversee the expedition and meet more than half the cost. In 1891 he founded the Free Church of Scotland East African Scottish Mission.

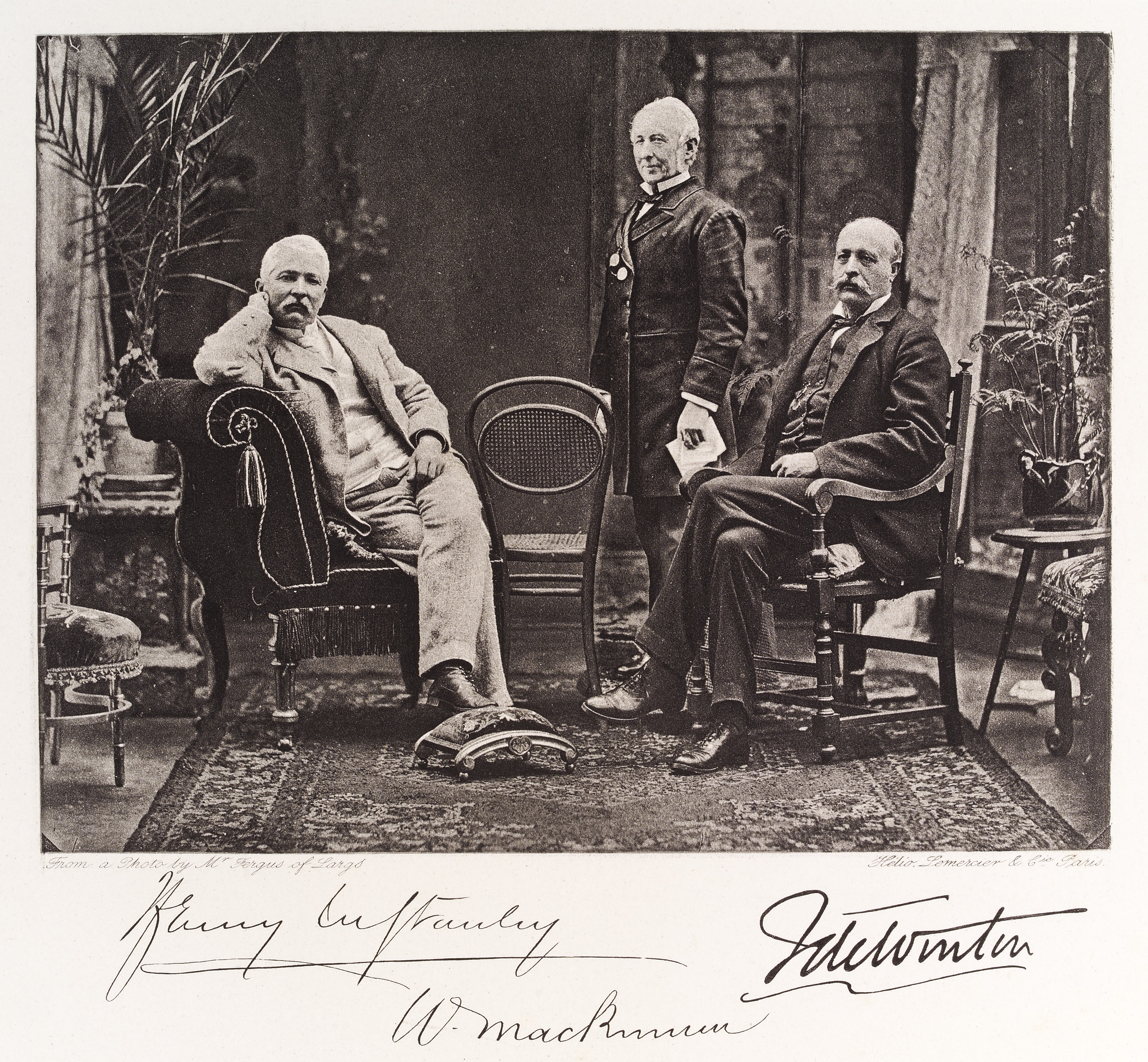
William Mackinnon (middle) with Sir Henry Morton Stanley and Major-General Sir Francis de Winton

=== Death ===
He died at the Burlington Hotel in London in 1893 and was buried at Clachan in Kintyre, near his home, Balinakill House.

=== Legacy ===
He and his nephew, Duncan MacNeil, left bequests which were used to start the Mackinnon MacNeil Trust with a mandate to "provide a decent education to deserving Highland lads".

The trustees purchased the former estate of James Nicol Fleming on Keil Point, Southend, Kintyre, including Keil House, and set up the Kintyre Technical School. After only nine years a fire destroyed the building and the school, renamed Keil School, moved to Helenslee House in Dumbarton where it continued until 2000.

Following the closure of the school, and the sale of the land, the Mackinnon MacNeil Trust was able to continue to help young people and exists now to give bursaries to students from the Western Highlands and Islands going to university. The Trust is still chaired by a member of the Mackinnon family.

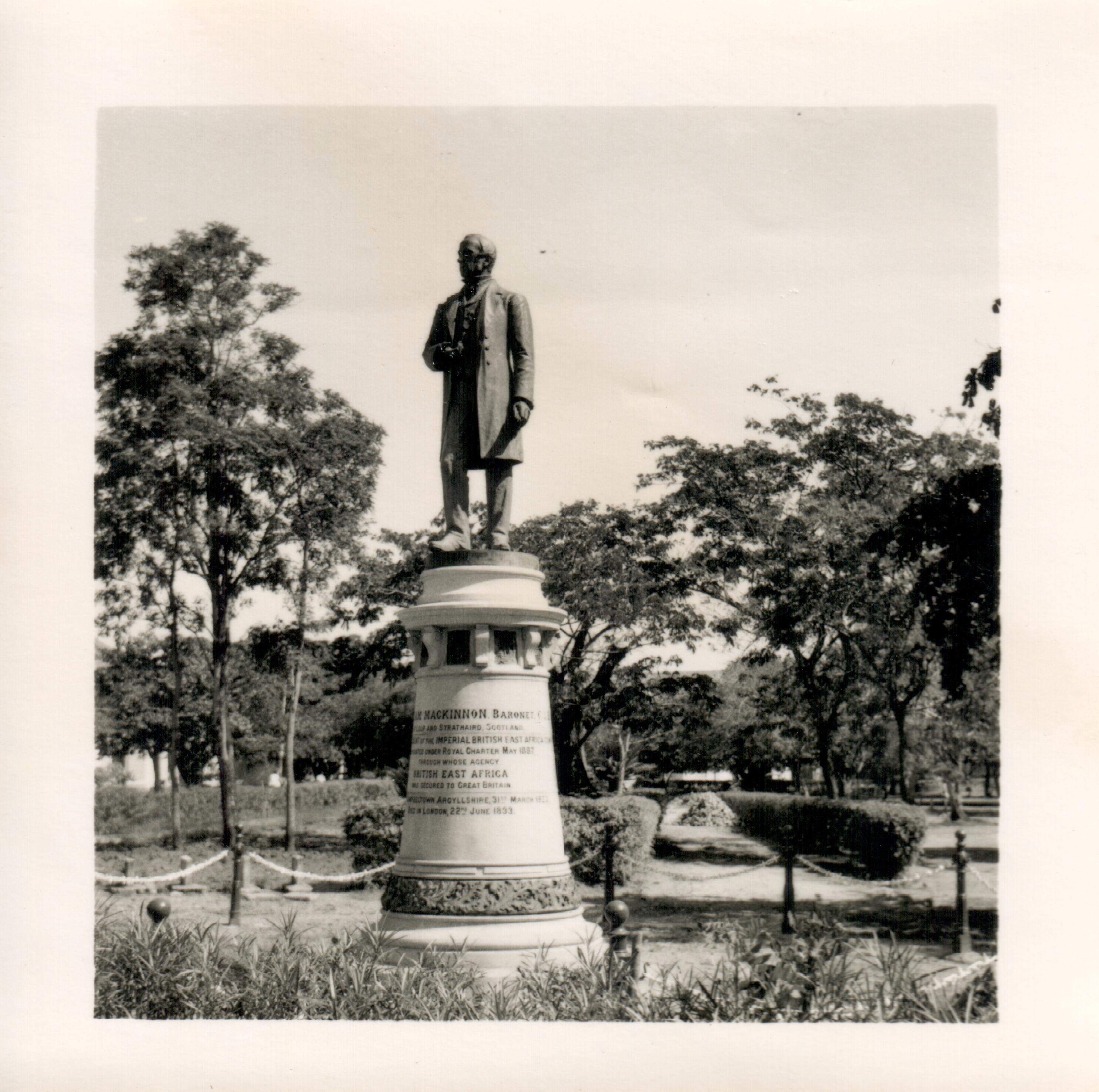
The statue of Sir William Mackinnon, in its original location in Mombasa Kenya.

In 1890, a statue dedicated to Sir William Mackinnon was erected in Mombasa, Kenya. It was later moved to the Dumbarton School in 1964, and finally moved again and re-erected in Campbelltown in 2004.

== Archives ==
The papers of Sir William Mackinnon (PP MS 1) are held by Archives and Special Collections at the School of Oriental and African Studies, London.

Political offices
Preceded by None	Colonial Head of British East Africa, later Kenya; 1887–1889	Succeeded by George Sutherland Mackenzie
Baronetage of the United Kingdom
New creation	Baronet (of Strathaird and Loup); 1889–1893	Extinct
Preceded by Boehm baronets	Mackinnon baronets of Strathaird and Loup; 15 July 1889	Succeeded by Burns baronets
