= Imperial British East Africa Company =

Commercial trade association (1888–1896)

- Type: Public
- Industry: Colonial enterprises
- Founded: London, United Kingdom 18 April 1888; 138 years ago
- Founder: William Mackinnon
- Defunct: 1896
- Fate: Bankruptcy, territory became Uganda Protectorate and East Africa Protectorate
- Area served: Uganda; Jubaland; Kenya
- Key people: Frederick Lugard

The Imperial British East Africa Company (IBEAC) was a commercial association founded to develop African trade in the areas controlled by the British Empire. The company was incorporated in London on 18 April 1888 and granted a royal charter by Queen Victoria on 6 September 1888. It was led by the Scotsman William Mackinnon and built upon his company's trading activities in the region, with the encouragement of the British government through the granting of an imperial charter, although it remained unclear what that actually meant.

The IBEAC oversaw an area of about 246,800 square miles (639,000 km^{2}) along the eastern coast of Africa (from modern-day Somalia to modern-day Kenya), its centre being at about 39° East longitude and 0° latitude. Mombasa and its harbour were central to its operations, with an administrative office about 50 miles (80 km) south in Shimoni. It granted immunity of prosecution to British subjects and allowed them the right to raise taxes, impose custom duties, administer justice, make treaties and otherwise act as the government of the area.

In 1893 the IBEAC transferred its administration rights of the territory to the British Government. The territory was then divided to form the Uganda Protectorate in 1894 and East Africa Protectorate (later Kenya) in 1895.

== History ==
In the early 1880s, European powers rushed to acquire territories within areas of interest in Africa, which had not yet been claimed by a non-African nation or state. One of these areas, the Sultanate of Zanzibar and the interior of Eastern Africa, caught the attention of both Germany and Britain. Hoping to resolve this common interest in a peaceful manner, in 1886 Germany and Britain signed a treaty in which they agreed upon what lands they would exclusively pursue. Germany would lay claim to the coast of present-day Tanzania and Britain retained access to the area in which Kenya and Uganda lie.

At the same time, Britain was focusing its resources in other interests which included land acquired in Southern Africa. This left the British government reluctant in accepting full responsibility for this newly acknowledged region. In an effort to ease this potential burden, Britain considered allowing a commercial company the right to administer and develop the eastern territory. In 1888, Sir William Mackinnon and the Imperial British East Africa Company (IBEAC) were authorized to serve this purpose.

The IBEAC assumed responsibility of annexing the land stretching from the eastern coast of Kenya all the way to the northwestern shore of Lake Victoria.

Other than the expected work involved with governing the exportation and management of goods and agriculture, the main role of the IBEAC was to begin facilitating the construction of a railway connecting the east coast region of Mombasa to Lake Victoria. The company employed James Macdonald assisted by John Wallace Pringle, both officers in the Royal Engineers, to undertake the survey in 1891–1892. The two reported favourably, noting that Kikuyuland would be suitable for European settlement. However, the IBEAC lacked the funds needed to start the work. The IBEAC started building the Mackinnon-Sclater road, a 600 miles (970 km) ox cart track from Mombasa to Busia on the Uganda border, in 1890.

The company ordered a 110-ton general purpose steamship, the SS William Mackinnon, to operate on Lake Victoria. She was built in Scotland in 1890 and delivered in kit form to Mombasa. However, the kit remained there in storage until 1895, presumably because the IBEAC did not succeed in starting to build the railway that would deliver the kit to the lake.

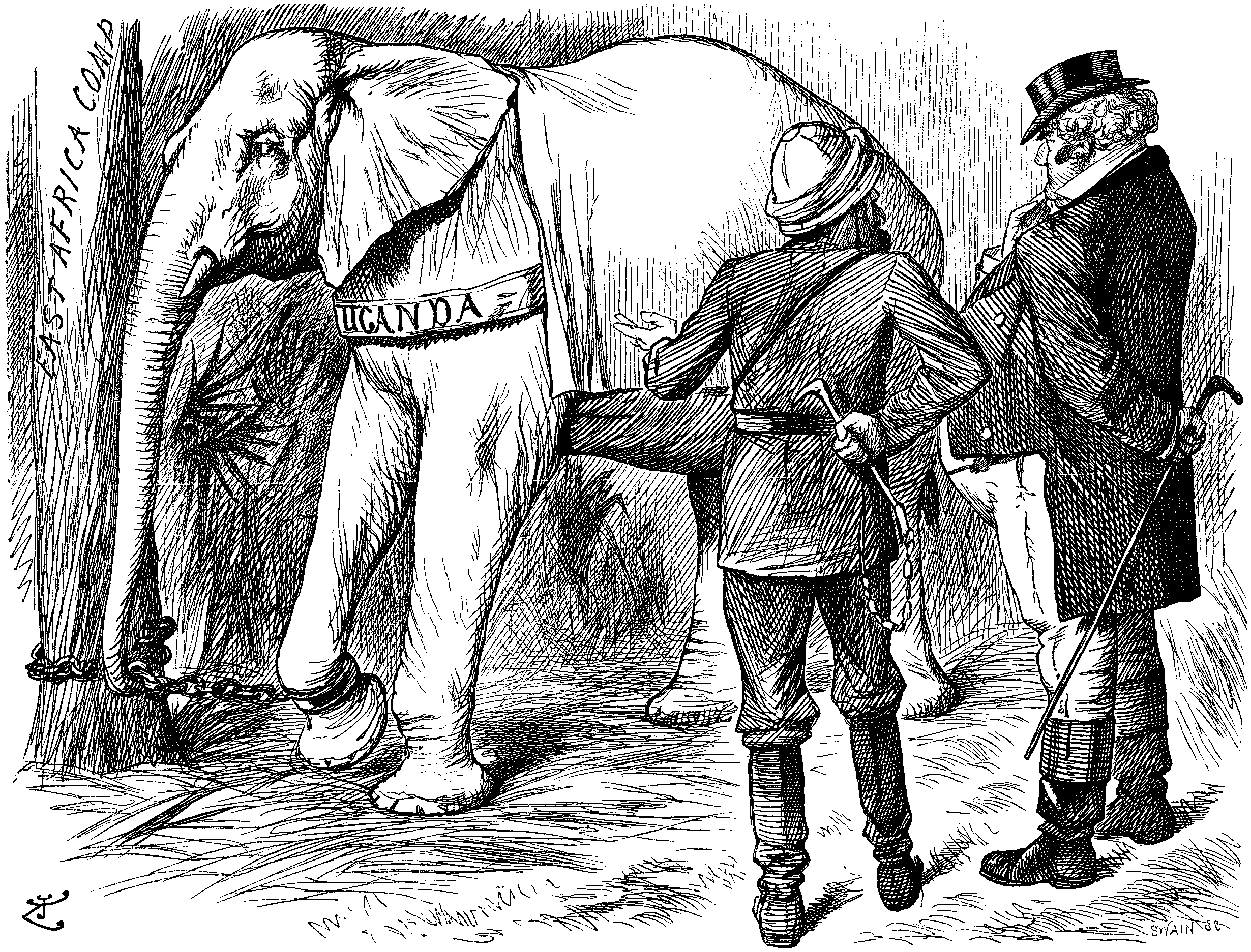
1892 Punch cartoon depicting the Uganda conflict as a white elephant for the British East Africa Company.

Brewing conflict between rival factions ultimately prevented the company from investing the necessary time and money into this venture. The four groups involved in Uganda, the Kabaka, French Catholics, Protestants, and the company, could not resolve their squabble amicably and with tensions continuing to rise, civil war broke out in January 1892. With the aid of Frederick Lugard, the individual given the task of building the company a fortified location on Kampala Hill, the IBEAC earned itself a fruitless victory.

This conflict proved to be the company's final undoing. IBEAC was already struggling financially due to customs issues but the money spent funding this skirmish all but bankrupted it. This also made clear that the company would be unable to continue its poorly executed attempt at colonizing eastern Africa.

A miserable fraud and a disgrace to the English name.

— Sir Gerald Portal

The British East Africa Company proved to be an ineffective attempt at allowing commercial businesses local administrative rights. Inevitably, in 1894, the British government declared a protectorate over Uganda effectively dissolving IBEAC and assuming full responsibility.

The main part of the Mackinnon-Sclater road was completed by the British government after the demise of the IBEAC. The British government eventually built the Uganda Railway to Kisumu on Lake Victoria, between 1896 and 1901. SS William Mackinnon reached Kisumu in kit form in 1898, was launched in 1900 and, like the railway, was completed and entered service in 1901.

== See also ==
- Colonial Heads of Kenya
- German East Africa

== Sources ==
- Carlyle, E. I.; Galbraith, John S (2004). "Mackinnon, Sir William, baronet (1823–1893)". Oxford Dictionary of National Biography (revised ed.). Oxford University Press. doi:10.1093/ref:odnb/17618. (Subscription, Wikipedia Library access or UK public library membership required.)
- Galbraith, John S, 1970, "Italy, the British East Africa Company, and the Benadir Coast, 1888–1893", The Journal of Modern History 42. 4, pages 549-563
- "No. 25854". The London Gazette. 7 September 1888. pp. 5017–5020.
- "Sir William Mackinnon". AIM25. SOAS. 15 May 2000. Archived from the original on 8 August 2017.
