= Speke (ship) =

Speke may refer to a number of sailing ships;

- Speke, a ship built in Calcutta in 1789 that made three voyages transporting convicts from Britain to New South Wales.
- Speke, a 2,800-ton sailing ship wrecked at Phillip Island, Victoria, Australia in 1906.
- PS Speke, a paddlesteamer built in 1910 for Uganda Railway.
