= Narrow-gauge railway =

Railway line with a width less than the standard

A narrow-gauge railway (narrow-gauge railroad in the US) is a railway with a track gauge (distance between the rails) narrower than 1,435 mm (4 ft 8 1/2 in) standard gauge. Most narrow-gauge railways are between 600 mm (1 ft 11 5/8 in) and 1,067 mm (3 ft 6 in).

Since narrow-gauge railways are usually built with tighter curves, smaller structure gauges, and lighter rails, they can be less costly to build, equip, and operate than standard- or broad-gauge railways (particularly in mountainous or difficult terrain). Lower-cost narrow-gauge railways are often used in mountainous terrain, where engineering savings can be substantial. Lower-cost narrow-gauge railways are often built to serve industries as well as sparsely populated communities where the traffic potential would not justify the cost of a standard- or broad-gauge line. Narrow-gauge railways have specialised use in mines and other environments where a small structure gauge necessitates a small loading gauge.

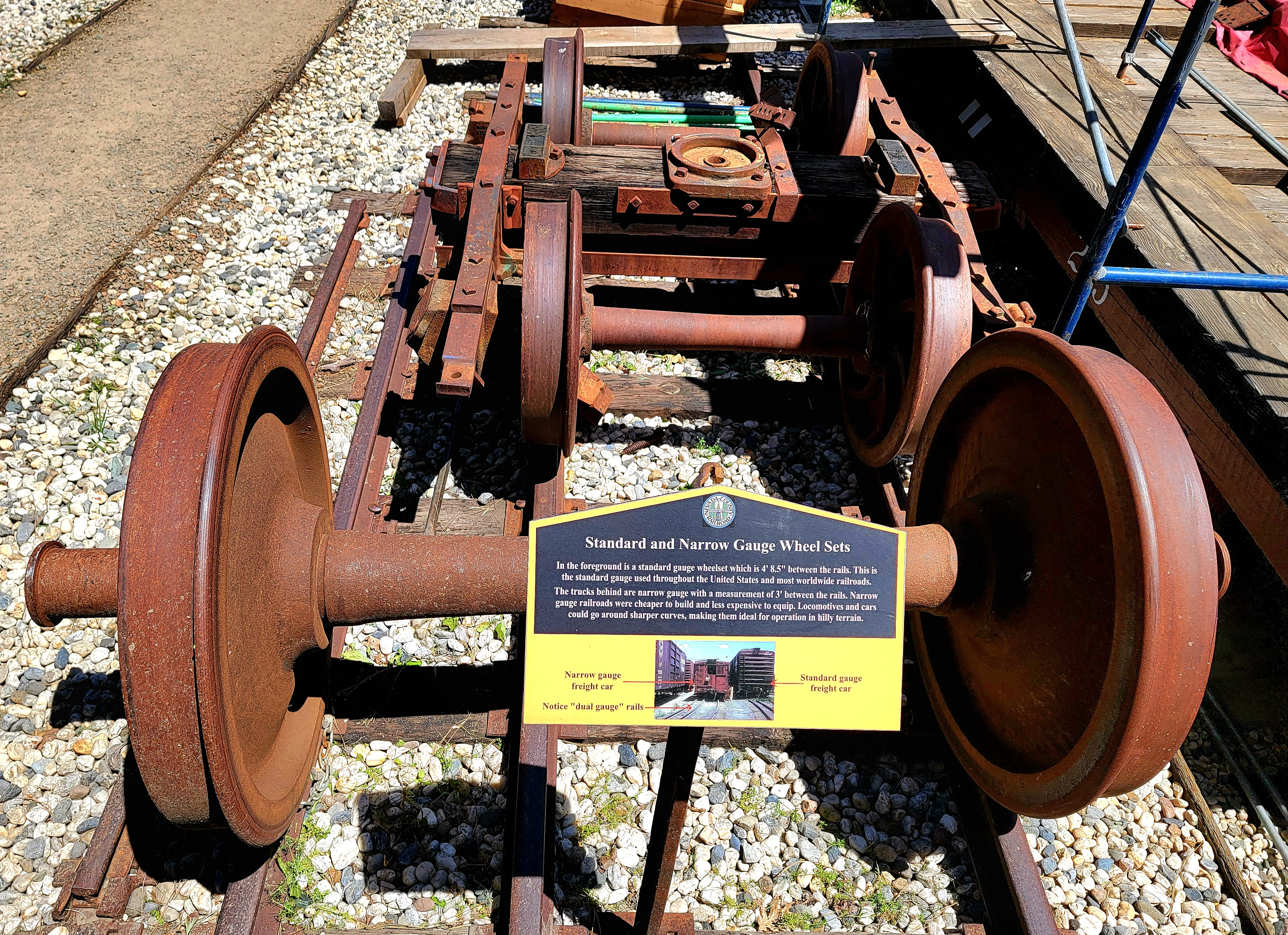
Comparison of standard gauge and three foot narrow gauge wheelsets

In some countries, narrow gauge is the standard: Japan, Indonesia, Taiwan, New Zealand, South Africa, and the Australian states of Queensland, Western Australia and Tasmania have a 3 ft 6 in (1,067 mm) gauge, whereas Vietnam, Malaysia and Thailand have metre-gauge railways. Narrow-gauge trams, particularly metre-gauge, are common in Europe. Non-industrial, narrow-gauge mountain railways are (or were) common in the Rocky Mountains of the United States and the Pacific Cordillera of Canada, Mexico, Switzerland, Bulgaria, the former Yugoslavia, Greece, and Costa Rica.

== Nomenclature ==
A narrow-gauge railway is one where the distance between the inside edges of the rails is less than 1,435 mm (4 ft 8 1/2 in). Historically, the term was sometimes used to refer to what are now standard-gauge railways, to distinguish them from broad-gauge railways, but this use no longer applies.

== History ==
=== Early hand-worked lines ===
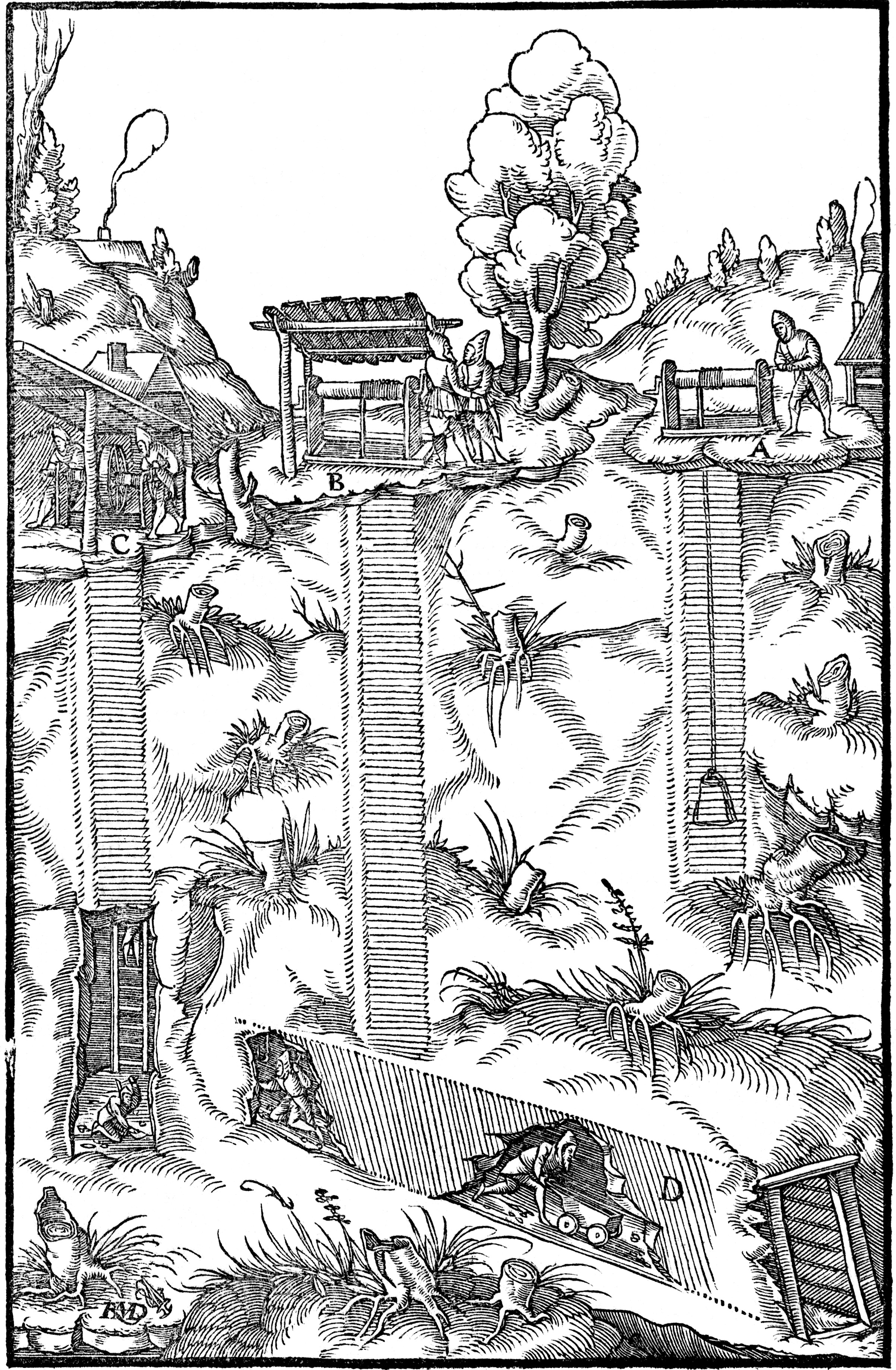
1556 woodcut from De re metallica, showing a narrow-gauge railway in a mine

The earliest recorded railway appears in Georgius Agricola's 1556 De re metallica, which shows a mine in Bohemia with a railway of about 2 ft (610 mm) gauge. During the 16th century, railways were primarily restricted to hand-pushed, narrow-gauge lines in mines throughout Europe. In the 17th century, mine railways were extended to provide transportation above ground. These lines were industrial, connecting mines with nearby transportation points (usually canals or other waterways). These railways were usually built to the same narrow gauge as the mine railways from which they developed.

=== Introduction of steam ===
The world's first steam locomotive, built in 1802 by Richard Trevithick for the Coalbrookdale Company, ran on a 3 ft (914 mm) plateway. The first commercially successful steam locomotive was Matthew Murray's Salamanca built in 1812 for the 4 ft 1 in (1,245 mm) Middleton Railway in Leeds. Salamanca was also the first rack-and-pinion locomotive. During the 1820s and 1830s, a number of industrial narrow-gauge railways in the United Kingdom used steam locomotives. In 1842, the first narrow-gauge steam locomotive outside the UK was built for the 1,100 mm (3 ft 7 5/16 in)-gauge Antwerp-Ghent Railway in Belgium. The first use of steam locomotives on a public, passenger-carrying narrow-gauge railway was on the Hamar–Grundset Line in Norway, which opened on 23 June 1862. In Great Britain the Ffestiniog Railway introduced passenger service in 1865 after receiving its first locomotives two years earlier.

=== Industrial use ===
Many narrow-gauge railways were part of industrial enterprises and served primarily as industrial railways, rather than general carriers. Common uses for these industrial narrow-gauge railways included mining, logging, construction, tunnelling, quarrying, and conveying agricultural products. Extensive narrow-gauge networks were constructed in many parts of the world; 19th-century mountain logging operations often used narrow-gauge railways to transport logs from mill to market. Significant sugarcane railways still operate in Cuba, Fiji, Java, the Philippines, and Queensland, and narrow-gauge railway equipment remains in common use for building tunnels.

=== Introduction of internal combustion ===
In 1897, a manganese mine in the Lahn valley in Germany was using two benzine-fuelled locomotives with single cylinder internal combustion engines on the 500 mm gauge tracks of their mine railway; these locomotives were made by the Deutz Gas Engine Company (Gasmotorenfabrik Deutz), now Deutz AG. Another early use of internal combustion to power a narrow-gauge locomotive was in 1902. F. C. Blake built a 7 hp petrol locomotive for the Richmond Main Sewerage Board sewage plant at Mortlake. This 2 ft 9 in (838 mm) gauge locomotive was probably the third petrol-engined locomotive built.

=== First World War and later ===
Extensive narrow-gauge rail systems served the front-line trenches of both sides in World War I. They were a short-lived military application, and after the war the surplus equipment created a small boom in European narrow-gauge railway building.

== Improvements ==
=== Heavy-duty tracks ===
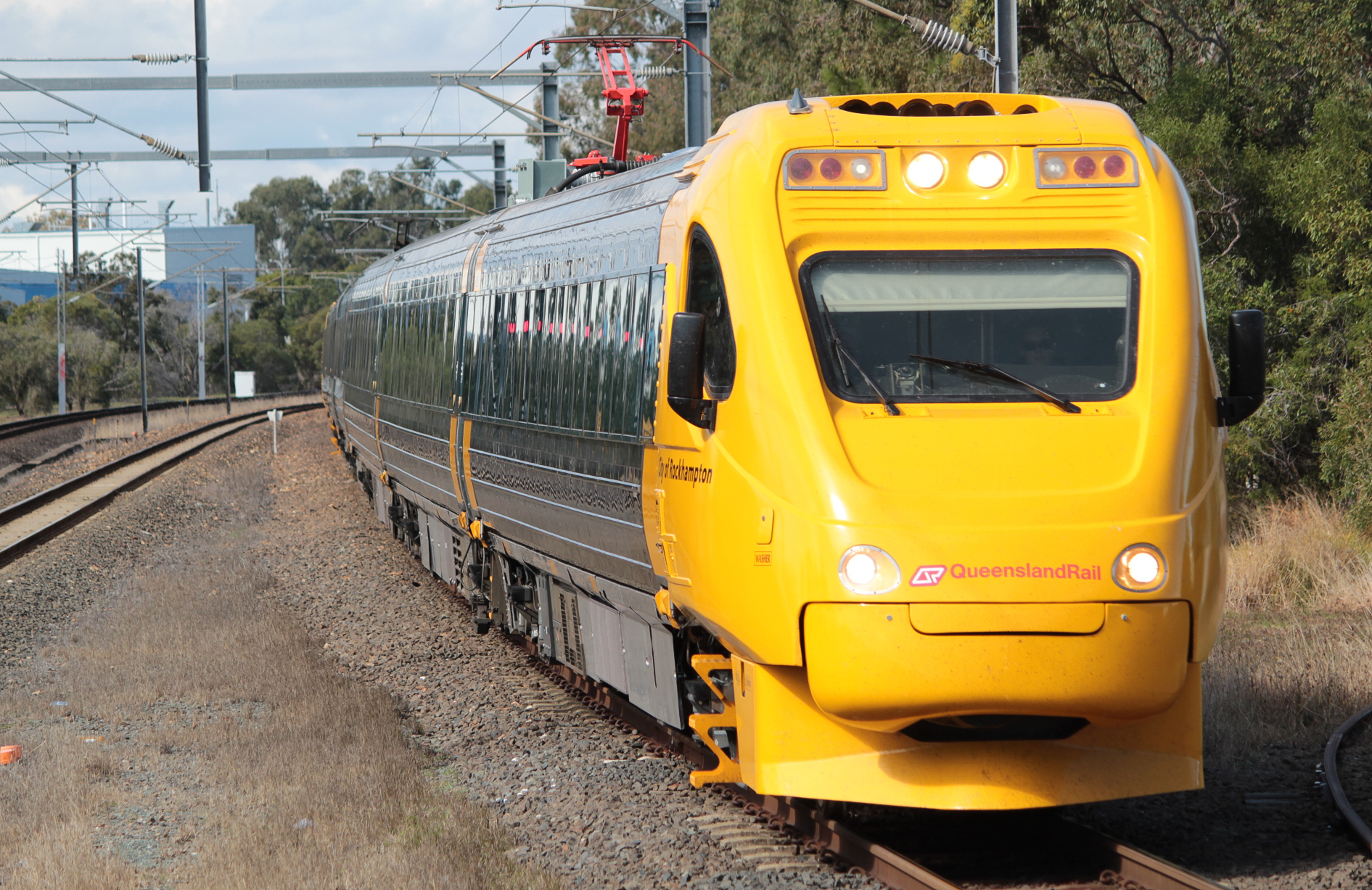
An Electric Tilt Train in Queensland. Unlike other states in Australia which use different gauges, Queensland's network is made up of 3 ft 6 in (1,067 mm)-gauge track.

The heavy-duty 3 ft 6 in (1,067 mm) narrow-gauge railways in Australia (Queensland, South Australia, Western Australia. Tasmania), New Zealand, South Africa, Japan, Taiwan, Indonesia and the Philippines demonstrate that if the track is built to a heavy-duty standard, then performance is almost as good as a standard-gauge line is possible.

Two-hundred-car trains operate on the Sishen–Saldanha railway line in South Africa, and high-speed Tilt Trains run in Queensland. In South Africa and New Zealand, the loading gauge is similar to the restricted British loading gauge; in New Zealand, some British Rail Mark 2 carriages have been rebuilt with new bogies for use by Tranz Scenic (Wellington-Palmerston North service), Tranz Metro (Wellington-Masterton service), and Auckland One Rail (Auckland suburban services).

Another example of a heavy-duty narrow-gauge line is Brazil's EFVM. At 1,000 mm (3 ft 3 3/8 in) gauge, it has over-100-pound rail (100 lb/yd or 49.6 kg/m) and a loading gauge almost as large as US non-excess-height lines. The line has a number of 4,000-horsepower (3,000 kW) locomotives and 200-plus-car trains.

=== Fastest trains ===
Narrow gauge's reduced stability means that its trains cannot run at speeds as high as on broader gauges. For example, if a curve with standard-gauge rail (1435 mm) can allow speed up to 145 km/h (90 mph), the same curve with narrow-gauge rail (1067mm) can only allow speed up to 130 km/h (81 mph).

In Japan and Queensland, recent permanent-way improvements have allowed trains on 3 ft 6 in (1,067 mm) gauge tracks to exceed 160 km/h (99 mph). Queensland Rail's Electric Tilt Train, the fastest train in Australia and the fastest 3 ft 6 in (1,067 mm) gauge train in the world, set a record of 210 km/h (130 mph). The speed record for 3 ft 6 in (1,067 mm) narrow-gauge rail is 245 km/h (152 mph), set in South Africa in 1978.

A special 2 ft (610 mm) gauge railcar was built for the Otavi Mining and Railway Company with a design speed of 137 km/h (85 mph). Curve radius is also important for high speeds: narrow-gauge railways allow sharper curves, but these limit a vehicle's safe speed.

== Gauges ==
Many narrow gauges, from 15 in (381 mm) gauge to 4 ft 8 in (1,422 mm) gauge, are in present or former use. They fall into several broad categories:

=== Just under standard gauge ===
==== 4 ft 7 3/4 in (1,416 mm) ====
- Huddersfield Corporation Tramways
- Glasgow Corporation Tramways

=== 4 ft 6 in gauge ===
4 ft 6 in (1,372 mm) track gauge (also known as Scotch gauge) was adopted by early 19th-century railways, primarily in the Lanarkshire area of Scotland. 4 ft 6 1/2 in (1,384 mm) lines were also constructed, and both were eventually converted to standard gauge.

=== Around 4 ft gauge ===
==== 4 ft 1 in (1,245 mm) ====
- Middleton Railway

==== 4 ft (1,219 mm) ====
- Barrow-in-Furness Tramways Company
- Bradford Corporation Tramways
- Canton and Massillon Electric Railway
- City of Oxford Tramways Company
- Darwen Corporation Tramways
- Derby Tramways Company
- Falkirk and District Tramways
- Glasgow Subway
- Honolulu Rapid Transit and Land Company
- Keighley Tramways
- Padarn Railway
- Reading Corporation Tramways
- Redruth and Chasewater Railway
- Saundersfoot Railway
- Wellington tramway system

==== 1,200 mm (3 ft 11 1/4 in) ====
- Central Funicular
- Fribourg funicular
- Gardena Ronda Express
- Rheineck–Walzenhausen mountain railway, Appenzell Railways
- Schlossbergbahn (Freiburg)
- Stoosbahn
- Zagreb Funicular
- Žaliakalnis Funicular

=== 3 ft 9 1/2 in (1,156 mm) ===
- Arcata and Mad River Railroad
- Northern Redwood Lumber Company

==== 3 ft 9 in (1,143 mm) ====
- Middlebere Plateway

=== 1093 mm gauge ===
- Köping–Uttersberg–Riddarhyttan Railway

=== 3 ft 6 in gauge ===
Comparison of 4 ft 8 1/2 in (1,435 mm) standard gauge (blue) and 3 ft 6 in (1,067 mm) (red) width; the difference is 14.5 in (370 mm), or about 26 per cent of standard gauge.

1,067 mm (3 ft 6 in) between the inside of the rail heads, its name and classification vary worldwide and it has about 112,000 kilometres (70,000 mi) of track.

==== Similar gauges ====
- 1,055 mm (3 ft 5 1/2 in) in Algeria
- 1,050 mm (3 ft 5 11/32 in) on the Hejaz railway in Israel, Jordan, Lebanon, Saudi Arabia and Syria; only a few lines survive.

=== Metre gauge and Italian metre gauge ===
As its name implies, metre gauge is a track gauge of 1,000 mm (3 ft 3 3/8 in). It has about 95,000 km (59,000 mi) of track.

According to Italian law, track gauges in Italy were defined from the centre of each rail rather than the inside edges of the rails. This gauge, measured 950 mm (3 ft 1 3/8 in) between the edges of the rails, is known as Italian metre gauge.

=== 3 ft, 900 mm, and Swedish three-foot gauge ===
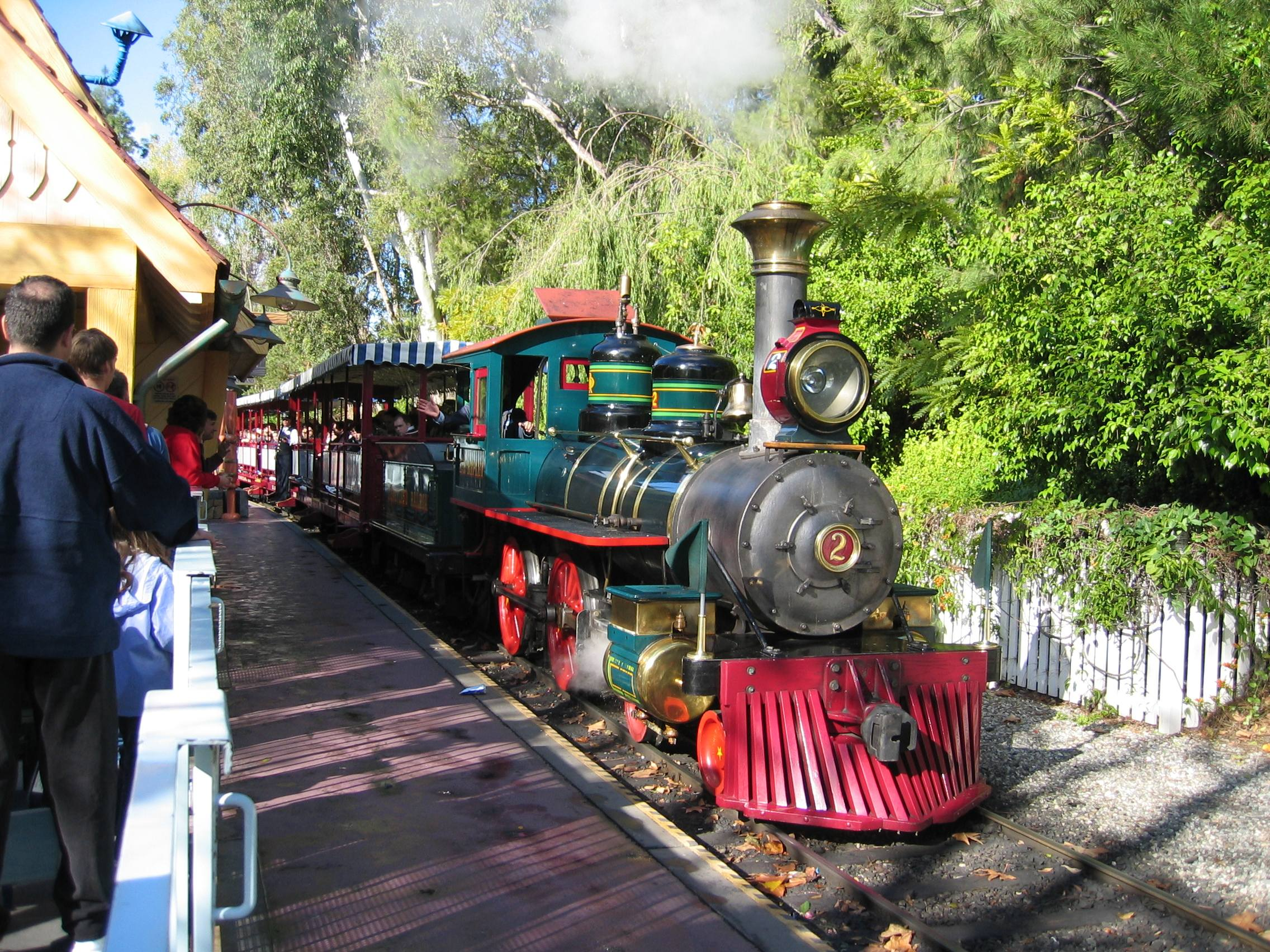
The 3 ft (914 mm) gauge Disneyland Railroad in California

There were a number of large 3 ft (914 mm) railroad systems in North America; notable examples include the Denver & Rio Grande and Rio Grande Southern in Colorado; the Texas and St. Louis Railway in Texas, Arkansas and Missouri; and, the South Pacific Coast, White Pass and Yukon Route and West Side Lumber Co of California. 3 ft was also a common track gauge in South America, Ireland and on the Isle of Man. 900 mm was a common gauge in Europe. Swedish three-foot-gauge railways (891 mm or 2 ft 11 3/32 in) are unique to that country and were once common all over the country. Today the only 891 mm line that remains apart from heritage railways is Roslagsbanan, a commuter line that connects Stockholm to its northeastern suburbs.

Currently, East Broad Top Railroad and Coal Company still operates on its 3 ft (914 mm) gauge rails.

=== 2 ft 9 in gauge ===
A few railways and tramways were built to 2 ft 9 in (838 mm) gauge, including Nankai Main Line (later converted to 3 ft 6 in or 1,067 mm), Ocean Pier Railway at Atlantic City, Seaton Tramway (converted from 2 ft) and Waiorongomai Tramway.

=== 800 mm, 2 ft 6 in, Bosnian and 750 mm gauge ===
800 mm (2 ft 7 1/2 in) gauge railways are commonly used for rack railways. Imperial 2 ft 6 in (762 mm) gauge railways were generally constructed in the former British colonies. 760 mm Bosnian gauge and 750 mm railways are predominantly found in Russia and Eastern Europe.

=== Between 2 ft 5 in (737 mm) and 2 ft 1 in (635 mm) gauge ===
Gauges such as 2 ft 3 in (686 mm), 2 ft 4 in (711 mm) and 2 ft 4 1/2 in (724 mm) were used in parts of the UK, particularly for railways in Wales and the borders, with some industrial use in the coal industry. Some sugar cane lines in Cuba were 2 ft 3 1/2 in (699 mm).

=== 2 ft and 600 mm gauges ===
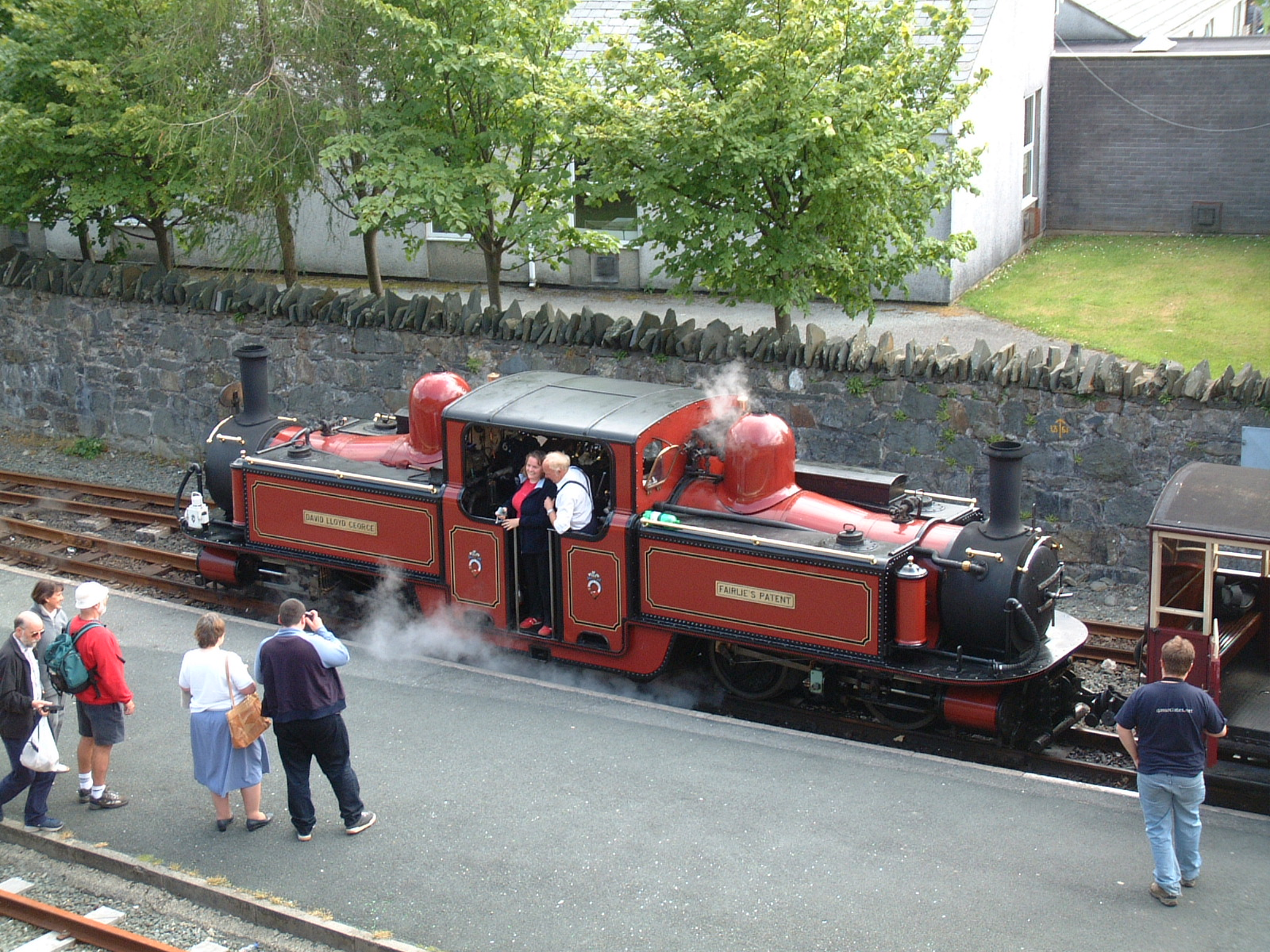
The 1 ft 11 1/2 in (597 mm) gauge Ffestiniog Railway in Wales

2 ft (610 mm) gauge railways were generally constructed in the former British colonies. The US had a number of railways of that gauge, including several in the state of Maine such as the Wiscasset, Waterville and Farmington Railway. 1 ft 11 3/4 in (603 mm), 600 mm (1 ft 11 5/8 in) and 1 ft 11 1/2 in (597 mm) were used in Europe.

=== Minimum gauge ===
Gauges below 1 ft 11 1/2 in (597 mm) were rare. Arthur Percival Heywood developed 15 in (381 mm) gauge estate railways in Britain and Decauville produced a range of industrial railways running on 500 mm (19 3/4 in) and 400 mm (15 3/4 in) tracks, most commonly in restricted environments such as underground mine railways, parks and farms, in France. Several 18 in (457 mm) gauge railways were built in Britain to serve ammunition depots and other military facilities, particularly during World War I.

== Narrow gauge railways by continent ==
=== Africa ===
- Narrow-gauge railways in Africa

=== Asia ===
- Narrow-gauge railways in Asia

=== Europe ===
- Narrow-gauge railways in Europe

=== North America ===
- Narrow-gauge railways in North America
- Rail transport in Central America

=== Oceania ===
- Narrow-gauge railways in Oceania

=== South America ===
- Narrow-gauge railways in South America

== See also ==
- Feldbahn
- Forest railway
- Heeresfeldbahn
- Industrial railway
- Light railway
- List of track gauges
- List of tram systems by gauge and electrification
- Military railways
- Rail transport in Walt Disney Parks and Resorts
- Ridable miniature railway
- Trench railways
- Track gauge
- War Department Light Railways

== Notes ==
- "Trade House" Kambarka Engineering Works "
- P. Whitehouse, J. Snell. Narrow Gauge Railways of the British Isles, David & Charles, 1994,
- Railroads of Colorado: Your Guide to Colorado's Historic Trains and Railway Sites, Claude Wiatrowski, Voyageur Press, 2002, hardcover, 160 pages, ISBN 0-89658-591-3
- Keith Chester. "East European Narrow Gauge" 1995
- "Narrow Gauge Through the Bush – Ontario's Toronto Grey and Bruce and Toronto and Nipissing Railways"; Rod Clarke; pub. Beaumont and Clarke, with the Credit Valley Railway Company, Streetsville, Ontario, 2007. ISBN 978-0-9784406-0-2
- "The Narrow Gauge For Us – The Story of the Toronto and Nipissing Railway"; Charles Cooper; pub. The Boston Mills Press; Erin, Ontario, 1982.
- "Narrow Gauge Railways of Canada"; Omer Lavallee; pub. Railfair, Montreal, 1972.
- "Narrow Gauge Railways of Canada"; Omer Lavallee, expanded and revised by Ronald S Ritchie; pub. Fitzhenry and Whiteside, Markham, Ontario, 2005.
- "The Toronto Grey and Bruce Railway 1863–1884; Thomas F McIlwraith; pub. Upper Canada Railway Society, Toronto, 1963.
- "Steam Trains to the Bruce"; Ralph Beaumont; pub. The Boston Mills Press; Cheltenham, Ontario, 1977
- "Running Late on the Bruce"; Ralph Beaumont & James Filby; pub The Boston Mills Press, Cheltenham, Ontario, 1980
- Nevada Central Narrow Gauge; Michael J. Brown
