= Ronald Hardy =

English novelist and screenwriter

Ronald Harold Hardy (16 November 1919 – October 1991) was an English novelist and screenwriter. His first novel The Place of Jackals was published in 1954 to acclaim. Hardy drew on his experiences as a liaison officer in Indochina during World War II in the writing of this novel. A review in Time magazine claimed that the novel "establishes him as Graham Greene's No. 1 disciple."

Hardy won the 1962 James Tait Black Memorial Prize for his fifth novel Act of Destruction. Besides his nine works of fiction, he wrote one non-fiction book about the construction of the Uganda Railway entitled The Iron Snake.

Hardy was also a TV screenwriter, with Suspense and Armchair Theatre among his credits. He qualified as a Certified Public Accountant before turning to writing. He married Betty Beattie and they had a son called David. After their marriage ended he married Joyce Cook and had two children, Christopher and Christine.

== Works ==
- The Place of Jackals, 1954
- A Name Like Herod, 1955
- Kampong, 1957
- The Men from the Bush, 1959
- Act of Destruction, 1962
- The Iron Snake, 1965 (non-fiction)
- Return to Arms, 1967
- The Savages, 1967
- "The Face of Jalanath",1973
- Rivers of Darkness, 1979
- The Wings of the Wind, 1987
