= George Whitehouse =

English engineer

Sir George Whitehouse KCB FRGS
- Born: 26 July 1857; London, United Kingdom
- Died: 17 November 1938 (aged 81); London, United Kingdom
- Education: King's College London
- Spouse: Florence Cecilia Hyatt (m. 1895)
- Engineering career
- Discipline: Civil engineer
- Institutions: Institution of Civil Engineers
- Projects: Uganda Railway

Sir George Whitehouse KCB FRGS (26 July 1857 – 17 November 1938) was an English civil engineer, chief engineer of the Uganda Railway between 1895 and 1903 and responsible for the founding of Nairobi.

== Biography ==
=== Early life ===
Whitehouse was born in London in 1857 and studied civil engineering at King's College London.

=== Early career ===
His first commission was with the Durban-Maritzburg railway in Natal. Thereafter he was posted to Mexico where he surveyed and constructed the mountain section of the Inter-Oceanic Railway between Vera Cruz and Mexico City. After a short spell back in the United Kingdom working on the Dover to Chatham line, he was posted to British India. He was employed by the public works committee of the North Western Province, and in 1886 he received thanks from the Government of India for his work in the Bolan Pass. His next move was to Peru, where he assisted in the construction of a railway in the Andes. In 1892 he became a member of the Institution of Civil Engineers.

=== Uganda Railway ===
In September 1895 he was appointed chief engineer of an ambitious plan to build a railway from the coast of Mombasa inland to Kampala, and embarked at Mombasa with his team in December 1895. Construction became infamous due to the difficulty of the terrain, and constant threat to the lives of workers from wildlife. Whilst planning the project, he selected the site of Nairobi as a store depot, shunting ground and camping ground for the labourers working on the railway. Nairobi was primarily chosen due to its favourable elevated position situated before the steep ascent of the Limuru escarpments. The settlement at Nairobi would develop into the administrative headquarters of the East Africa Protectorate and capital city of Kenya.

During his time in East Africa, Whitehouse was disillusioned with London, feeling that he was underpaid for his trials and responsibilities with the railway. He was also reprimanded twice by London, firstly for purchasing coal from India without permission and secondly for putting forth a proposal for extra leave for railway staff which was deemed too costly and generous. From 1901, despite being overworked and suffering from fever, he was put under pressure from London to complete the project. When the railway was opened for traffic in 1901, he became its manager in addition to the chief engineer. He resigned on its completion in April 1903 and returned to the United Kingdom with his family.

=== Later life ===
On his return to London, he was made a Knight Commander of the Order of the Bath but was warned by the consulting engineer for the project, Sir Alexander Rendel, that he would never get another job. In 1904, however, he was appointed chief engineer of the Central Argentine Railway and the Buenos Aires and Rosario Railway. He retired in 1910 and died at Westminster in London in 1938, survived by his wife and three sons.
