= Narrow-gauge railways in Asia =

Railways less than standard gauge

Asia has many narrow-gauge railways. The railways of Japan (except for high-speed lines), Indonesia (except for high-speed line) and the Philippines are predominantly 1,067 mm (3 ft 6 in) narrow gauge. Those in mainland Southeast Asia, which includes Vietnam, Cambodia, Laos, Thailand, Myanmar and Malaysia, are predominantly metre gauge. The proposed ASEAN Railway would be standard or dual gauge, using metre- and standard-gauge regional railway networks and linking Singapore (at the southern tip of the Malay Peninsula) through Malaysia, Thailand, Laos and Vietnam to China's standard-gauge rail network. In Western Asia, Jordan uses 1,050 mm (3 ft 5 11/32 in) narrow gauge.

== China ==
Some of China's rail network is metre gauge, and many narrow-gauge railways existed in the country. Metre-gauge railways were popular in several regions before 1949. The metre-gauge Kunming-Hekou Railway (previously known as the Sino-Vietnamese Railway) was built between Vietnam and China by French colonists. In Manchuria, lumber companies built narrow-gauge railways—primarily 2 ft 6 in (762 mm) gauge—into the forests. The 600 mm (1 ft 11 5/8 in), 176-kilometre (109 mi) Gebishi railway was built from Caoba towards Shiping. Built in 1915, its final 72-kilometre-long (45 mi) section was closed in 1990.

== Hong Kong ==
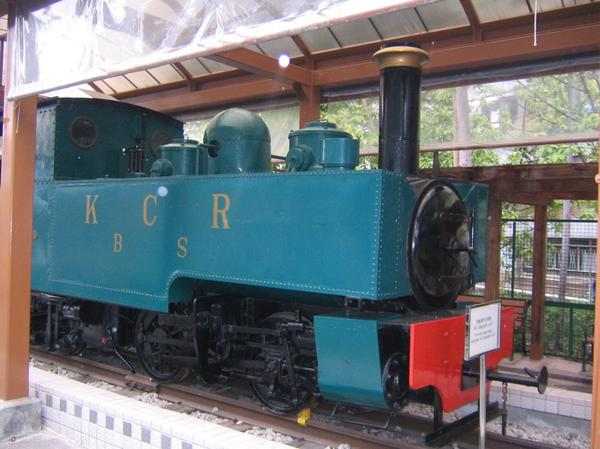
Preserved Kowloon-Canton Railway locomotive

In Hong Kong, the Kowloon-Canton Railway was partially laid with 2 ft (610 mm) and 3 ft (914 mm) gauge during its 1910 construction but was soon converted to standard gauge. The Sha Tau Kok Railway had a 2 ft (610 mm) gauge for much of its existence. The Hong Kong Tramways are 3 ft 6 in (1,067 mm) gauge and the territory's metro, the MTR, runs on 1,432 mm (4 ft 8 3/8 in) except for its leased, standard-gauge KCR network.

== India ==
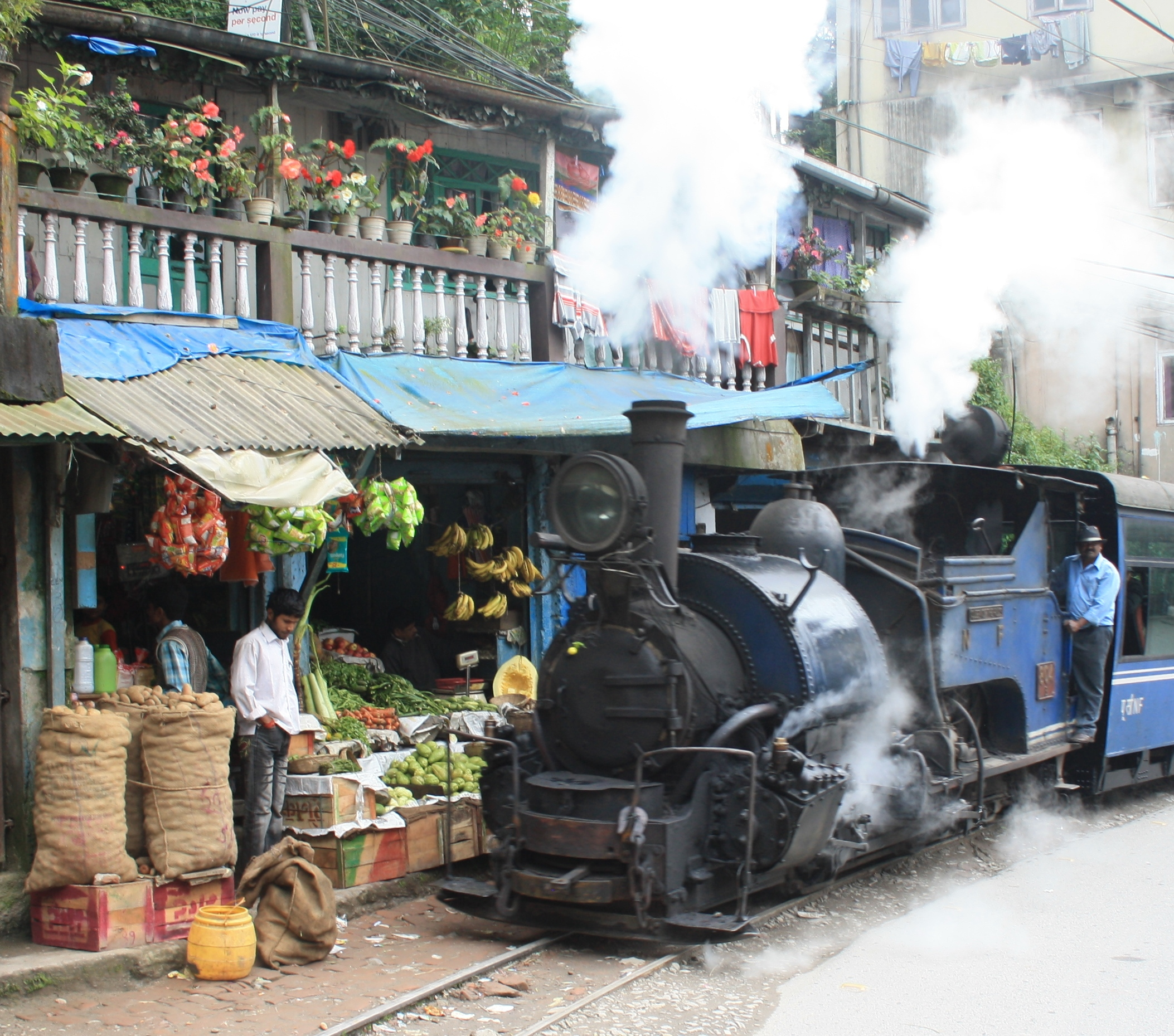
Darjeeling Himalayan Railway

India had a substantial number of narrow-gauge railways. Almost all of them have been converted to broad gauge, remaining used only for tourism.

Operational narrow-gauge railways are, the metre-gauge Nilgiri Mountain Railway, the 2 ft 6 in (762 mm) Kalka–Shimla Railway and Kangra Valley Railway and the 2 ft (610 mm) Darjeeling Himalayan and Matheran Hill Railways. These Mountain railways of India are UNESCO World Heritage Sites, and avoided conversion to broad gauge under Project Unigauge.

== Indonesia ==
Indonesia had a number of narrow-gauge railways including KRL and supporting industry, primarily sugarcane plantations in Java. Sugarcane production has been declining, and the railways are now largely closed or used for tourism. Most of the country's active railways use the 3 ft 6 in (1,067 mm) gauge. Standard gauge railways in Indonesia is used for Cut Meutia (train) in Aceh, Trans-Sulawesi Railway in Sulawesi, Jakarta LRT, Jabodebek LRT, and Jakarta-Bandung High-speed rail in Java.

== Japan ==
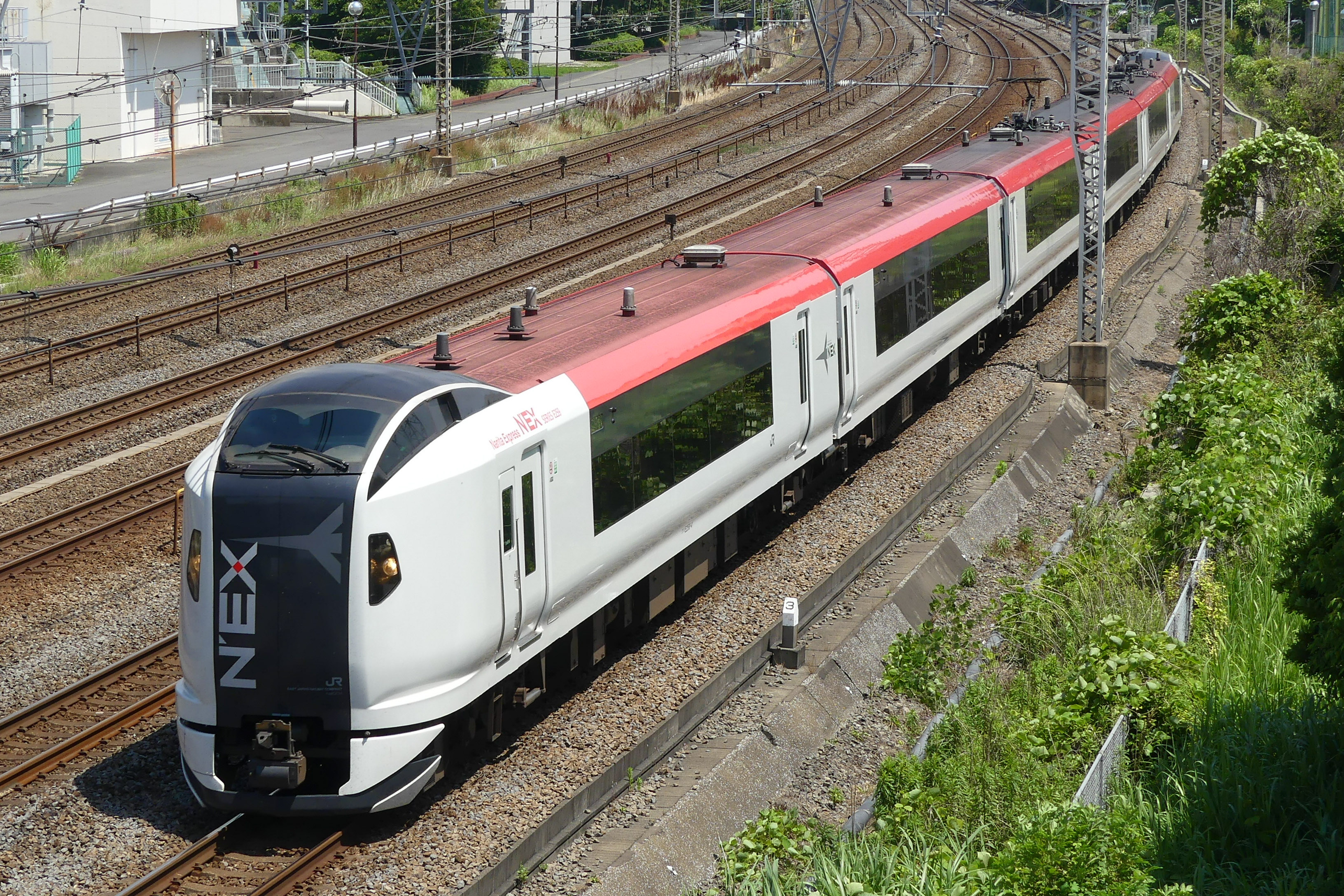
JR East express train

Except for the high-speed Shinkansen lines and JR East's Ōu and Tazawako Lines, all of Japan Railways Group's network is narrow-gauge 1,067 mm (3 ft 6 in). Some companies, such as Kintetsu Railway (except for the Minami Osaka, Domyoji, Nagano, Gose, Yoshino Lines, also for Nishi-Shigi and Ikoma Cable Lines), Keisei Electric Railway, Keikyu, Hankyu, the Toei Asakusa Line, and Tokyo Metro's Ginza and Marunouchi Lines, use standard gauge.

Tokyo's Keio Corporation network and the Toei Shinjuku subway line, which provide through service, use an unusual 1,372 mm (4 ft 6 in) gauge. This gauge is also used on the Tokyo and Hakodate tramways.

Japan adopted 762 mm (2 ft 6 in) as a standard narrow gauge for small, forestry, and industrial lines. Most of these narrow-gauge lines were abandoned, and only a few remain in operation: Yokkaichi Asunarou Railway's Utsube Line and Hachiōji Lines, the Sangi Railway Hokusei Line, and the Kurobe Gorge Railway Main Line.

== Malaysia ==
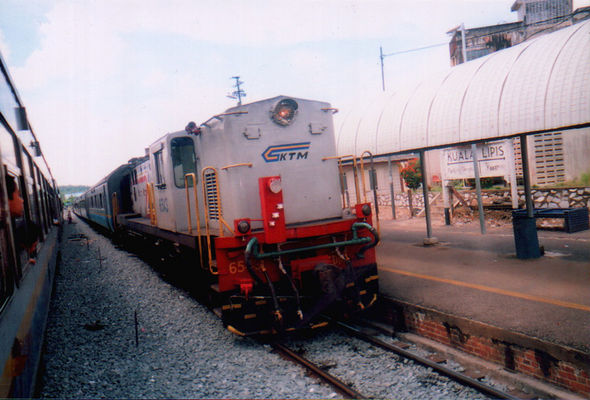
A KTMB train

Malaysia's oldest railway systems are metre gauge, a standard which was adopted when the British colonial government laid down the first rail lines in 1885. Keretapi Tanah Melayu, the main railway operator in Peninsular Malaysia, uses metre gauge for the main west- and east-coast intercity lines and the lines spanning Singapore from the Johor-Singapore Causeway to the Tanjong Pagar railway station. Existing metre-gauge lines are also used for KTM Komuter, the country's commuter rail service, which links Kuala Lumpur and its suburbs. Standard gauge is used by the Putra LRT and Star LRT light rail operators in Kuala Lumpur and the privately operated Express Rail Link to Kuala Lumpur International Airport.

In Sabah, the North Borneo Railway (Keretapi Negeri Sabah) runs a metre-gauge line from Kota Kinabalu to Tenom in the Crocker Range via Beaufort. Steam locomotives are also used on this route.

== Philippines ==
Except for the 1,435 mm (4 ft 8 1/2 in) Line 1, Line 2 and Line 3 systems in Metro Manila, the Philippine National Railways (PNR) uses a 3 ft 6 in (1,067 mm) track gauge. The PNR has one line (from Manila to the southern Luzon city of Legazpi), but only operates commuter rail service in Metro Manila. Until the 1980s, a more-extensive network ran north to San Fernando in La Union province.

A number of industrial narrow-gauge steam railways are operated by the sugarcane industry, concentrated on the islands of Negros and Panay. The Visayas region is the hub of the sugarcane lines, and some mills (such as La Carlotta Milling in Negros) run charter trains for tourists.

Abandoned lines remain on the islands of Cebu (abandoned in the 1950s or 1960s), Mindanao and Panay (closed in the 1990s). Panay Railways operated a 3 ft 6 in (1,067 mm) rail line from Roxas City and Iloilo City until the mid-1980s.

== Taiwan ==
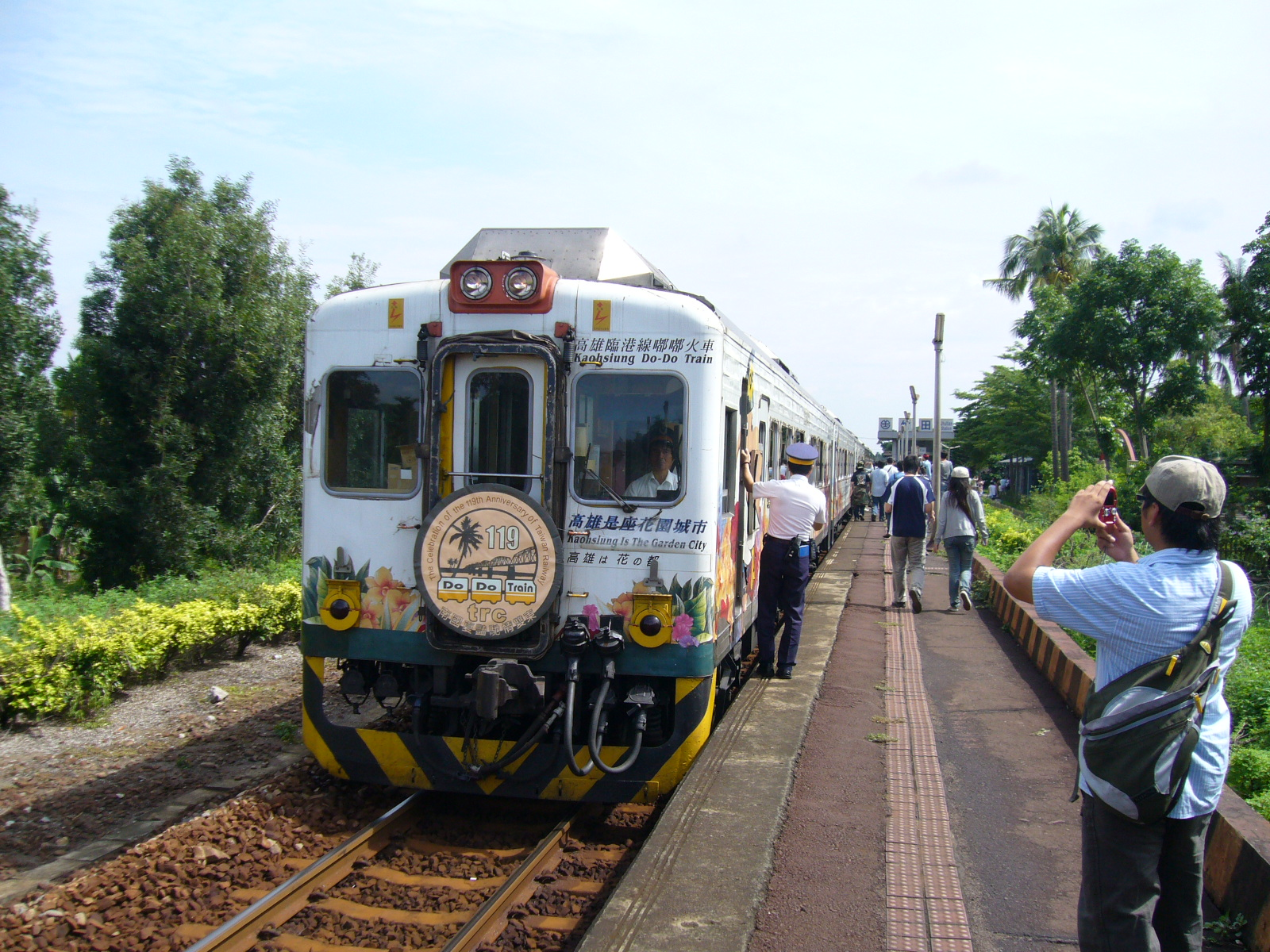
Taiwan narrow-gauge service

Taiwan began developing its rail service during the Qing dynasty, using a 3 ft 6 in (1,067 mm) gauge. The Japanese colonial government, which ruled from 1895 to 1945, continued using that gauge. The system is now administered by the Taiwan Railway, and the Taipei Metro and Kaohsiung MRT use standard gauge. The Taiwan High Speed Rail (THSR), which began operation in January 2007, also uses standard gauge. A 2 ft 6 in (762 mm) gauge line on the east coast was regauged to 3 ft 6 in (1,067 mm) when it was interconnected.

A 2 ft 6 in (762 mm), narrow-gauge Alishan Forest Railway stretches 72 kilometres (45 mi) and connects Chiayi to the mountain resort of Alishan. The line is primarily a tourist attraction. On 7 September 2006, the Taiwanese government announced a plan to update to standard gauge.

== Thailand ==
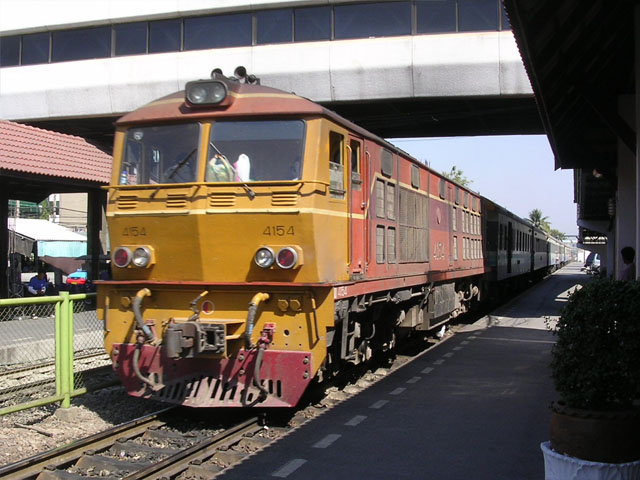
SRT Alsthom-built metre-gauge locomotive

The Northern Line was originally standard gauge, but it was regauged after 1919 and the State Railway of Thailand now operates entirely on metre gauge (including service to Malaysia and Laos). However, standard gauge is used by the BTS skytrain, the MRT and the Bangkok airport link. All proposed new high-speed lines would be standard gauge. At Siam Park City in Bangkok, a light railway for visitors operated for about two decades. The Siam Park City Railway had a 2 ft (610 mm) track gauge; remnants are still visible, and the locomotives are at the former roofed depot.
