= Narrow-gauge railways in Oceania =

Numerous narrow-gauge railway lines were built in Oceania, most in 3 ft 6 in (1,067 mm), 2 ft 6 in (762 mm) and 2 ft (610 mm) track gauge.

== Australia ==
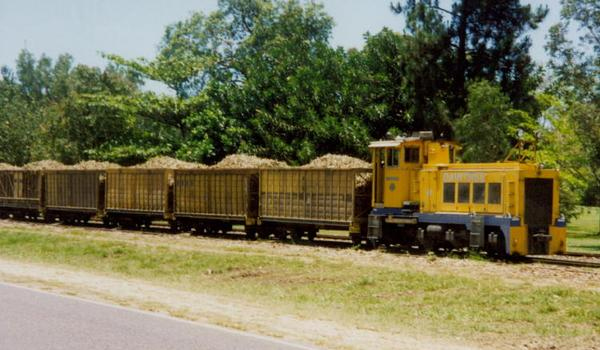
Sugar train near Mossman in 1995

Queensland, Tasmania, Western Australia and parts of South Australia adopted 1,067 mm (3 ft 6 in) gauge to cover greater distances at lower costs. Most industrial railways are built to 610 mm (2 ft) gauge. Three different rail gauges are currently in wide use in Australia, and there is little prospect of full standardisation.

Before 1901, each of the six British colonies was responsible for rail transport infrastructure. Queensland, Western Australia, and Tasmania constructed for narrow-gauge railways. The other colonies built either standard-gauge or broad-gauge railways, maintaining only limited narrow-gauge rail lines, except for South Australia, which built both narrow and broad gauge. As a result of this legacy, Australian railways are a mix of all three gauges.

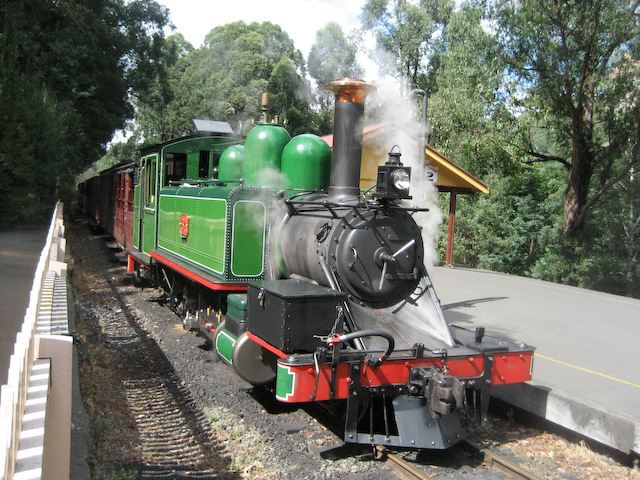
Puffing Billy train at Lakeside station

In 1865, the Queensland Railways was the first mainline narrow-gauge railway in the world. Its tracks would eventually extend to around 9000 km. Queensland Rail operates the QR Tilt Train, with a maximum speed of 165 km/h. This train currently holds the Australian Railway Speed Record of 210.7 km/h. Queensland also has extensive sugar cane tramways of 2 ft (610 mm) gauge.

Following the success of the narrow gauge in Queensland, several narrow-gauge lines were built in South East Australia. From the 1920s onwards several of these were converted to broad gauge. The first of these was the Port Wakefield Railway of 1867 where it was claimed that the cost of a railway varied with the cube of the gauge.

Inspired by the success of the narrow gauge in Queensland, Western Australia adopted the same gauge. Until closure in 1958 Perth had the only narrow-gauge tramway network of any considerable extent in mainland Australia.

The Northern Territory adopted narrow gauge when it was still part of South Australia, and a North–South transcontinental line was planned from Adelaide to Darwin in the 1870s. In the event this line was never completed, and due to flood damage and lack of traffic, the narrow gauge line was closed.

Tasmania converted to an all 1,067 mm (3 ft 6 in) gauge system in 1886, but introduced narrower-still 610 mm (2 ft) to reduce costs even more.

Four common-carrier lines in Victoria were built to the 2 ft 6 in (762 mm) narrow-gauge standard, to serve local farming and forestry communities. Sections of two lines (Belgrave to Gembrook and Thomson to Walhalla) have been restored as tourist railways.

== Fiji ==
Fiji used to have narrow gauge railways for harvesting sugar cane, and several horse-drawn street tramway systems.

== Hawaii ==
The state of Hawaii once had several narrow gauge railroads, mainly 3 ft (914 mm).

== Nauru ==
Nauru used to have a short 914 mm (3 ft) line used for phosphate mining.

== New Caledonia ==
The French territory of New Caledonoa once had a metre-gauge railway, the Nouméa-Païta railway and several narrow gauge industrial railway lines.

== New Zealand ==
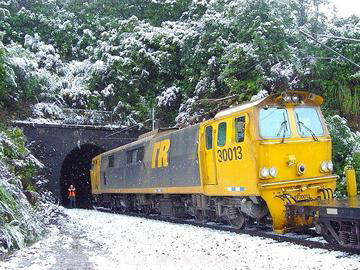
EF 30013 on the North Island Main Trunk

New Zealand adopted narrow gauge 3 ft 6 in (1,067 mm) gauge due to the need to cross mountainous terrain in the country's interior. This terrain has necessitated a number of complicated engineering feats, notably the Raurimu Spiral. There are 1787 bridges and 150 tunnels in less than 4,000 km of track.

Around 500 km of this track is electrified, the North Island Main Trunk between Palmerston North and Hamilton and the Auckland and Wellington suburban systems; see Railway electrification in New Zealand.

Much like Australia, there was initially no uniformity in track gauges in New Zealand. This was because the construction of railways was undertaken by the various provinces of New Zealand rather than the central government. The Canterbury Provincial Railways opened New Zealand's first railway in 1863 and used a broad gauge of 1,600 mm (5 ft 3 in), while Southland built the Bluff and Kingston Branches to 1,435 mm (4 ft 8 1/2 in), and short segments of 1,435 mm (4 ft 8 1/2 in) railway were also constructed in the Auckland and Northland Regions. Eventually, under the public works schemes of Premier Julius Vogel, the railways of New Zealand were made to adhere to a 1,067 mm (3 ft 6 in) gauge; see The Vogel Era. The first 1,067 mm (3 ft 6 in) gauge railway in New Zealand was the Dunedin and Port Chalmers Railway, which opened on 1 January 1873. Today, the network connects most major New Zealand cities, and is around 4,000 km in length.
