= Narrow-gauge railways in Africa =

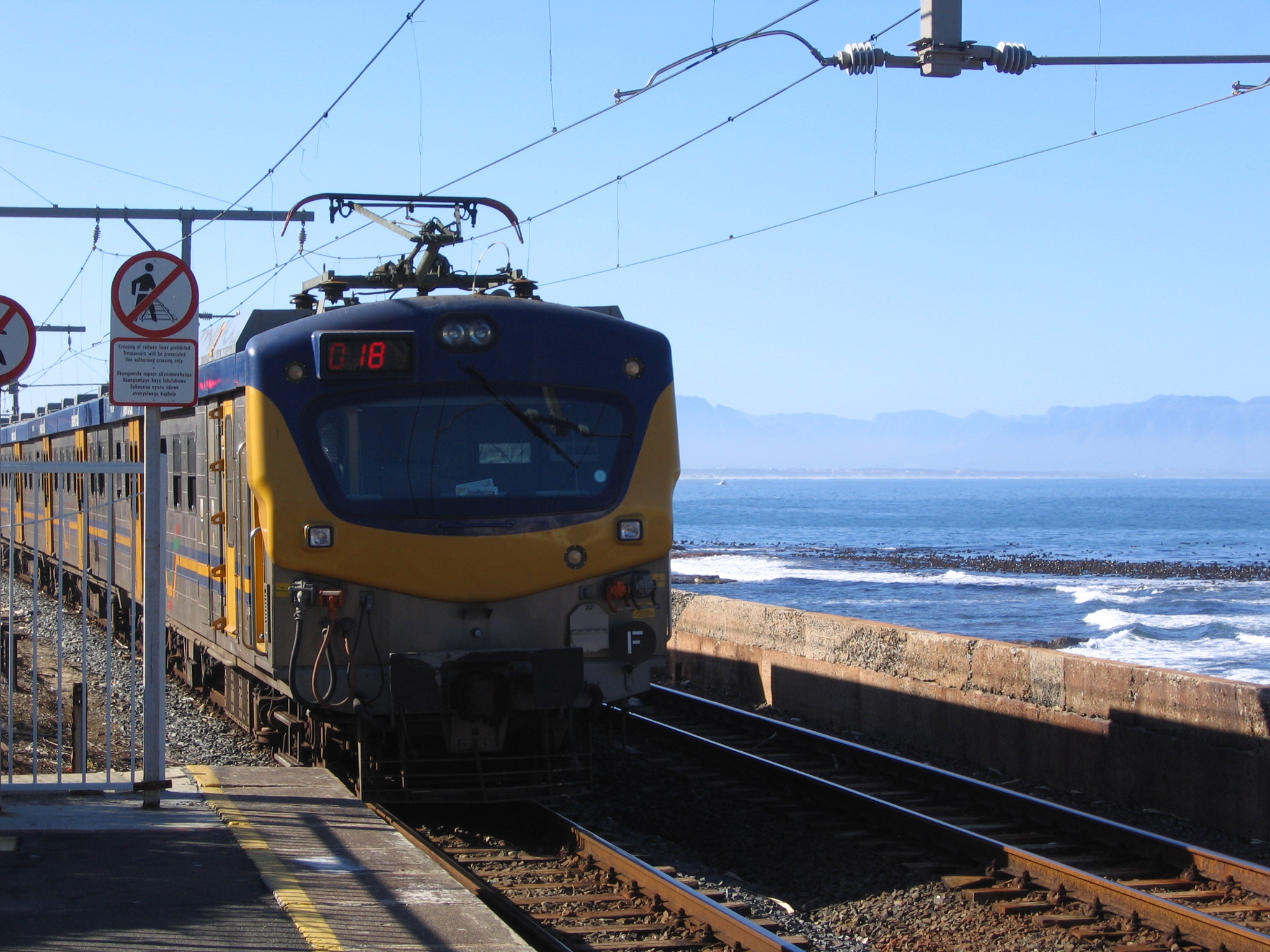
A modern commuter service near Cape Town

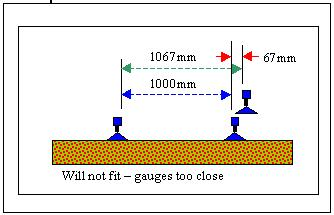
1,000 mm and 1,067 mm gauges are too close to allow 3-rail dual gauge

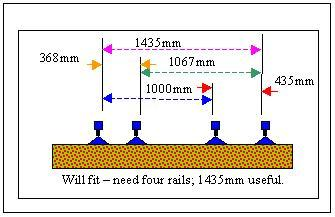
1,000 mm and 1,067 mm gauges can be combined as a 4 rail dual gauge with bonus 1,435 mm gauge

Narrow-gauge railways are common in Africa, where great distances, challenging terrain and low cost have made the narrow gauges attractive. Many nations, particularly in Southern Africa, including the extensive South African Railway network (Spoornet), use a 3 ft 6 in (1,067 mm) gauge. Metre gauge is also common, as in the case of the Uganda Railway. There used to be extensive 2 ft (610 mm) and 600 mm (1 ft 11 5/8 in) gauge networks in countries such as Morocco, Congo, Angola, Namibia and South Africa, but these have mostly been dismantled or converted. Some also survive in Egypt: in the countryside around Luxor, narrow-gauge railways are used for the transportation of sugar cane.

Because Africa is divided into many countries, railways built by different governments tend not to link up with each other, each country's lines connecting its outlands with its own port. Incompatible gauges are therefore not obvious. For example, a link from Nigeria to Cameroon would join 3 ft 6 in (1,067 mm) to 1,000 mm (3 ft 3 3/8 in).

The railways of South Africa and many other African countries, including Angola, Botswana, Congo, Ghana, Mozambique, Namibia, Nigeria, Sudan, Zambia and Zimbabwe, use 1,067 mm (3 ft 6 in) gauge, sometimes referred to as Cape gauge. Kenya, Uganda and others use 1,000 mm (3 ft 3 3/8 in) gauge lines. In Tanzania former East African Railways lines are metre gauge while the TAZARA line is 3 ft 6 in (1,067 mm)

== History ==
During the period of British colonisation of Africa, Cecil Rhodes advocated the construction of a Cape to Cairo railway, linking all British possessions along the eastern side of Africa between South Africa and Egypt. While most countries through which such a line would run have cape gauge lines, Tanzania and Kenya have metre gauge lines, although the TAZARA line in Tanzania is cape gauge.

== By country ==
=== Egypt ===
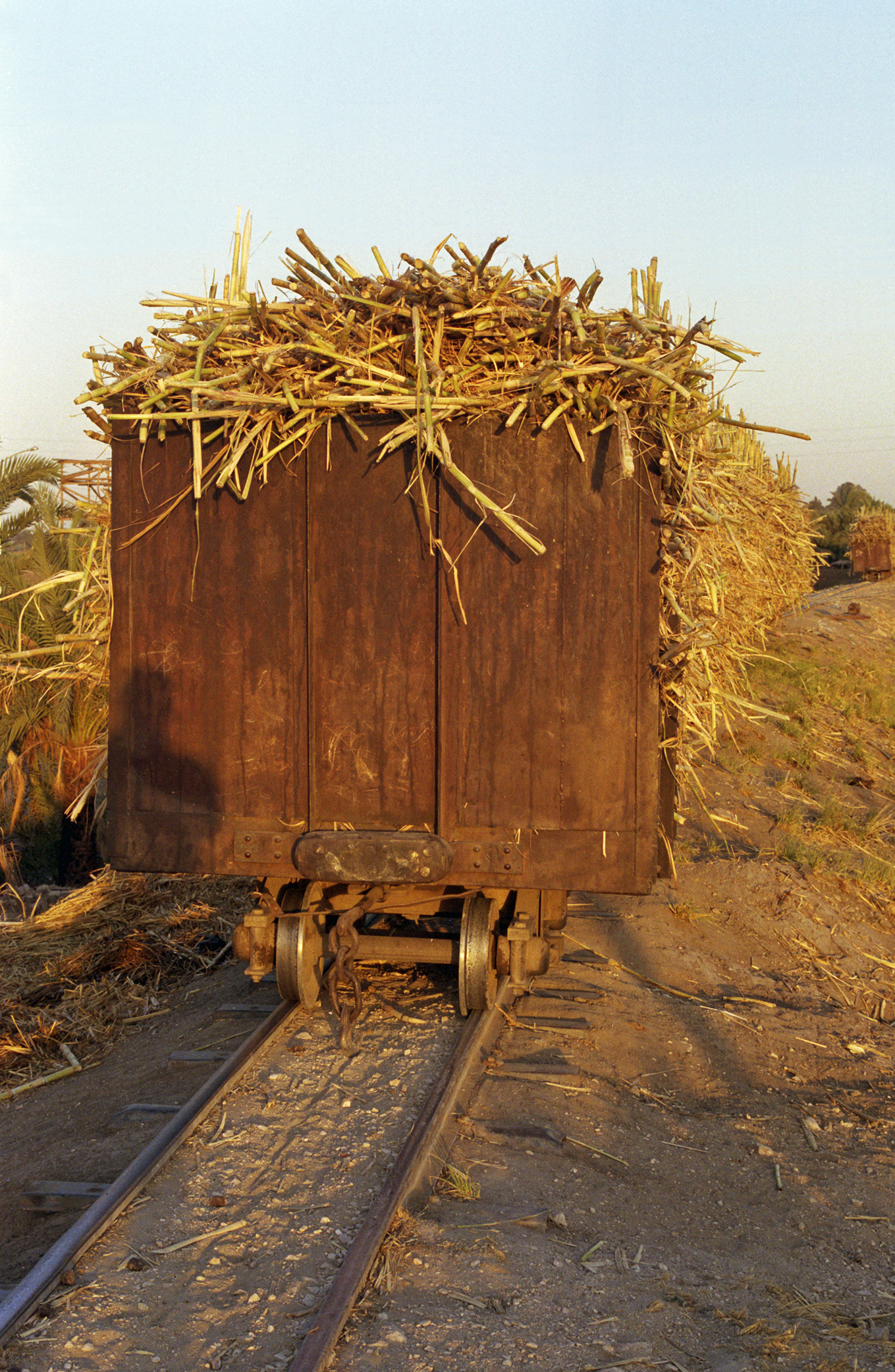
Narrow-gauge wagon at Qurna (Luxor region, Egypt) loaded with sugar cane

Metre gauge survive in Egypt: in the countryside around Luxor, narrow-gauge railways are used for the transportation of sugar cane.

=== Eritrea ===
The Eritrean Railway's 950 mm (3 ft 1 3/8 in) narrow-gauge railway was abandoned and heavily damaged during Eritrea's war of independence. It was later rebuilt between Asmara and Massawa. Neighbouring railways are 3 ft 6 in (1,067 mm) in Sudan and 1,435 mm (4 ft 8 1/2 in) in Ethiopia.

=== Cameroon ===
During the First World War when Cameroon was a German possession, a network of 2 ft (610 mm) gauge Feldbahn railways were built. These eventually extended to around 150 km of track serving rubber and palm oil plantations.

The 1,000 mm (3 ft 3 3/8 in) gauge is now in use.

=== Morocco ===
Morocco had from 1912 – 1935 one of the largest 600 mm (1 ft 11 5/8 in) gauge networks in Africa with total length of more than 1700 kilometres. After the treaty of Algeciras where the representatives of Great Powers agreed not to build any standard-gauge railway in Morocco until the standard gauge Tangier - Fez Railway being completed, the French had begun to build military 600 mm (1 ft 11 5/8 in) gauge lines in their part of Morocco.

=== Somalia ===
Railway transport in Somalia consisted of the erstwhile Mogadishu-Villabruzzi Railway and secondary tracks. The system was built during the 1910s by the authorities in Italian Somaliland. Its track gauge was 950 mm (3 ft 1 3/8 in), a gauge favoured by the Italians in their colonies in the Horn of Africa and North Africa. The railway was dismantled in the 1940s by the British during their military occupation of Italian Somaliland, and was subsequently never rehabilitated.

=== South Africa ===
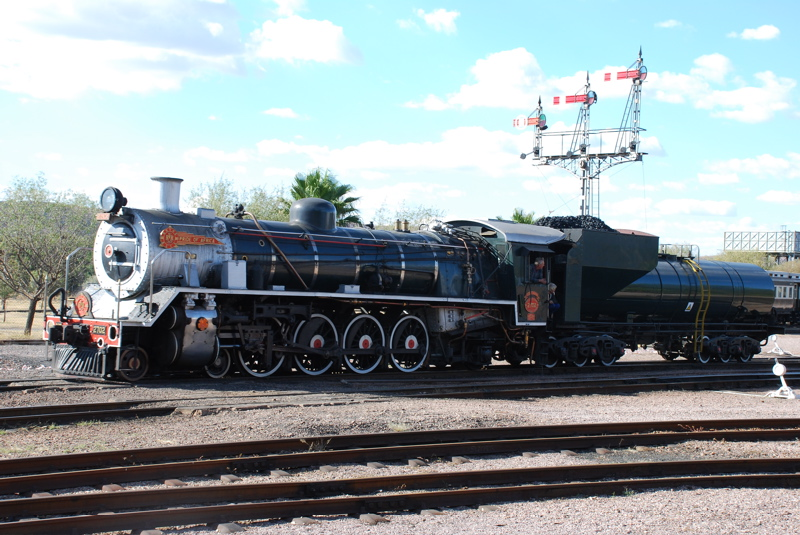
Class 19D locomotive at Pretoria

Originally standard gauge, the railways of the then Cape Colony changed to narrow gauge 3 ft 6 in (1,067 mm), sometimes known as Cape gauge, for cost-cutting reasons. However, with the development of a strong economy, with heavy export coal and iron ore traffic, and electrification of most main lines, South Africa, like Queensland, operates several narrow gauge trains that outdo most standard and broad gauge trains across the world. In fact, in 1989 the Sishen-Saldanha line set a world record by carrying the biggest train in history, 7.2 km long containing 660 wagons pulled by 15 locomotives and weighing 71,232 tonnes (70,107 long tons; 78,520 short tons), though most trains on this line routinely run with lower tonnage. However, the Gautrain between Johannesburg and Pretoria operates on standard gauge, and thus is not capable of using any of the country's existing rail network.

The Avontuur Railway operated between Port Elizabeth and Avontuur in South Africa. It was the longest 610 mm (2 ft) gauge route in the world at a length of 285 km. It was operated by the South African railway company Spoornet and more recently by railway enthusiasts. The line is commonly known as the Apple Express.

=== Tunisia ===
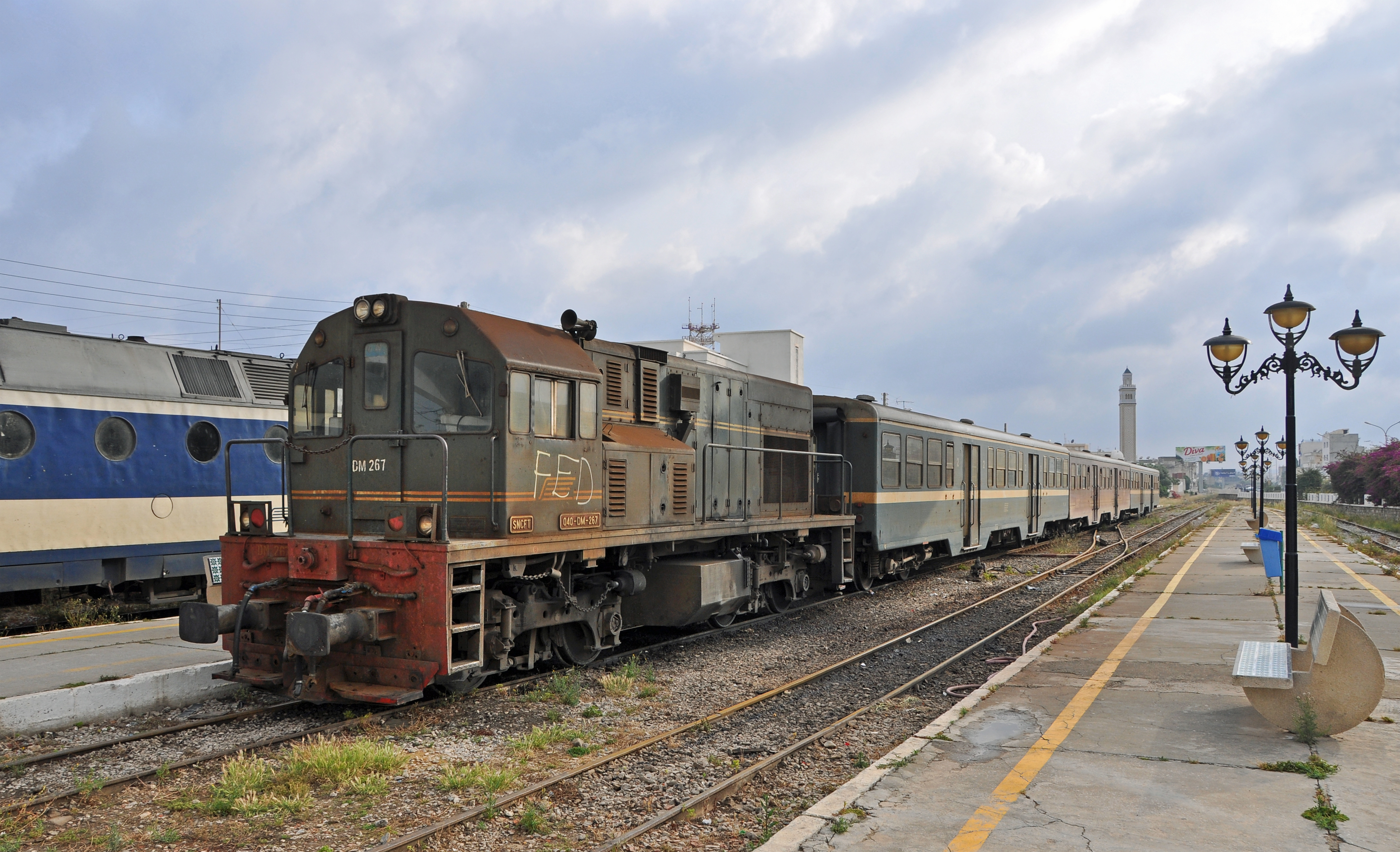
Train bound for Bir Bou Rekba in Nabeul station, on the metre gauge Cap Bon line

In Tunisia, the railway network in the central and southern part of the country is a metre gauge network, including the main lines Tunis-Sfax (Ligne de la Côte) and Tunis-Kasserine, and also the local Ligne du Cap Bon from Bir Bou Rekba to Nabeul.

== Gauge conversion ==
In the 2020s, several narrow gauge railways are being replaced with new standard gauge ones. This is also consistent with long term plans for the AIHSRN.
