= SS Speke (1891 ship) =

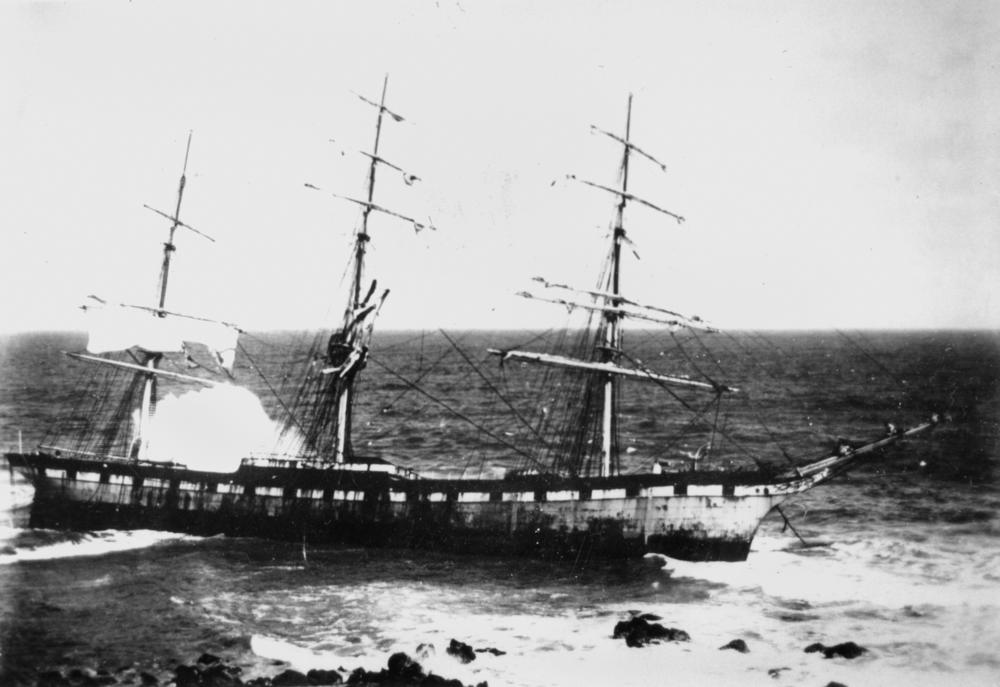
- Photograph of the wreck of the Speke, February 1906

History

Great Britain
- Name: Speke
- Owner: 1891:R W Leyland and Company.
- Builder: TR Oswald and Co. Ltd., Milford Haven
- Launched: 1891
- Fate: Wrecked in Kitty Miller Bay, Phillip Island, Victoria, Feb. 22 1906

General characteristics
- Tonnage: 2712 tons
- Length: 310 ft 0 in (94.5 m)
- Beam: 35 ft 0 in (10.7 m)
- Propulsion: Sail

Speke was a British cargo steamship built in 1891 at Milford Haven, Wales for a cost of £20,000. It was owned and operated by R W Leyland and Company.

On the evening of Thursday 22 February 1906 whilst bound for Geelong to load a cargo of wheat, the ship ran aground in Kitty Miller Bay, Phillip Island, Victoria, Australia. The wreck of the ship was sold later in 1906 for a mere £12.

The incident resulted in the death of seaman Frank Henderson either through battering or drowning.

Remnants of the wreck can still be seen today at low tide, and it is a walking spot on Phillip Island.
