= Charles Miller (author) =

American author of popular history books

Charles Miller (1918–1986) was an American author of popular history books on East Africa such as The Lunatic Express, An Entertainment in Imperialism (1971) and Battle for the Bundu, The First World War in East Africa (1974).

Miller lived in New York City and also wrote feature articles and book reviews for The Saturday Evening Post, Reader's Digest, The New Republic, and Saturday Review.

== Books ==
- Miller, Charles (1971), The Lunatic Express, An Entertainment in Imperialism, Macmillan; revised 2015, Head of Zeus.
- Miller, Charles (1974), Battle for the Bundu, The First World War in East Africa, Macmillan.
- Miller, Charles (1977), Khyber: British India's North West Frontier, Macmillan.
