= Narrow-gauge railways in North America =

== Canada ==
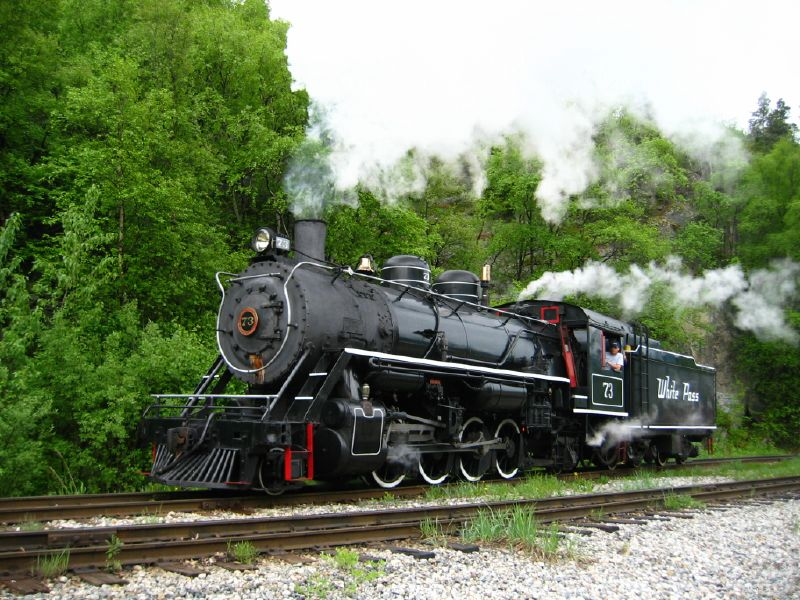
White Pass and Yukon Route Steam Locomotive 73

Although many railways of central and eastern Canada were initially built to a 5 ft 6 in (1,676 mm) (broad gauge), there were several railways, especially on Canada's Atlantic coast, which were built as individual narrow-gauge lines with track gauge 3 ft (914 mm) or 3 ft 6 in (1,067 mm)

The only narrow-gauge system still in operation in the country is the 3 ft (914 mm) gauge White Pass and Yukon Route.

== Costa Rica ==
Costa Rican railways are 1,067 mm (3 ft 6 in) Cape gauge. Due to its mountainous terrain, the first railway was laid using Cape gauge in 1871. This set the standard for other railways to use the same gauge. Currently all 950 km (590 mi) of rail are 1,067 mm (3 ft 6 in). They are state owned and operated by INCOFER.

See also Railways in Costa Rica

== El Salvador ==
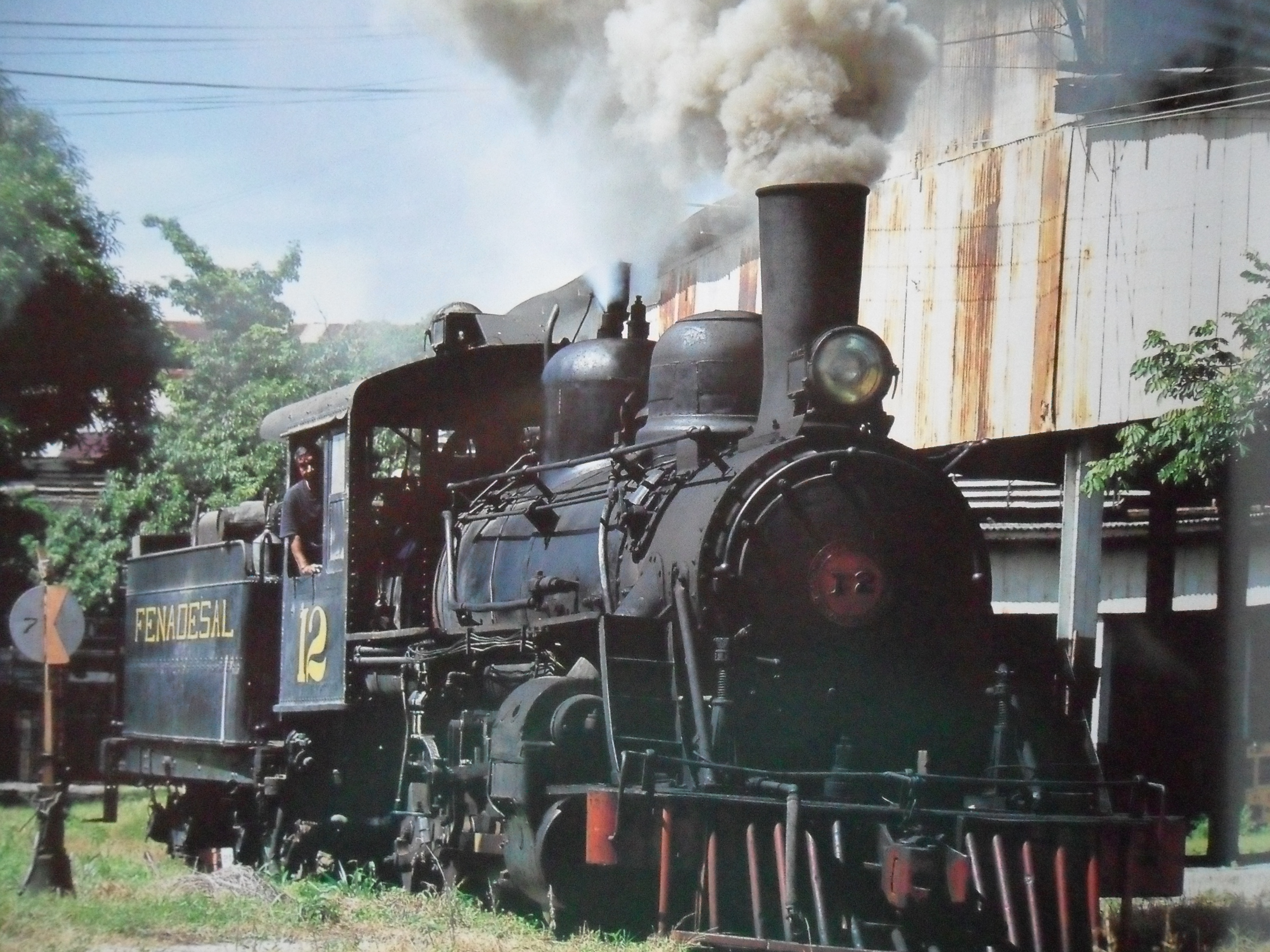
FENADESAL train near the capital of San Salvador in El Salvador.

El Salvador ran 3 ft (914 mm) gauge steam trains into the 1970s. How much of this survived a civil war, earthquake and hurricane is unknown. However, the country began to rebuild and fix existing tracks in anticipation for new train service. FENADESAL currently uses the tracks to connect the capital city of San Salvador to its suburbs. There are now more plans to start a metro rail on the current tracks, making it the most effective narrow-gauge train tracks in Central America.

== Guatemala ==
- 3 ft (914 mm) gauge, Ferrovías Guatemala

== Haiti ==
Haiti has had two different gauges on its railways.

- 130 km of rural line between Port-au-Prince, Saint-Marc, and Verrettes (1905–about 1960s) used 3 ft (914 mm) gauge.
- Tramlines in Port-au-Prince (1878–1888 and 1896–1932), which was the first known track in Haiti, and a total of 80 km of rural line west to Léogâne and east to Manneville (1896–1950s(?)) also used 3 ft (914 mm) gauge.
- Totalling over 100 km of track, the plantation railways in the north and north-east most likely used 2 ft 6 in (762 mm).

There were at least four separate isolated lines. It is said that one Haitian railroad was sold; the track was physically picked up and shipped to Asia during the Papa Doc period (approx. 1957–1971). Other gauges may have been used on the plantation tracks in the north and north-east of Haiti. The CIA fact book suggests that in the 1990s there were only 40 km of abandoned track left(?).

== Mexico ==
Various 3 ft (914 mm) narrow-gauge lines operated around Mexico City. A famous one operated in Morelos State. There were dozens of private narrow-gauge lines built to service the mining district, and some 2 ft (610 mm) common carriers including the Córdoba and Huatusco Railroad, Cazadero and San Pablo Railroad, Hornos Railroad, and Tacubaya Railroad.

The Yucatán Peninsula region of Mexico has a network of narrow-gauge lines, established before the region was linked by rail to the rest of Mexico in the 1950s. Only the main line connecting Mérida to central Mexico has been widened to standard gauge.

== Panama ==
=== See also ===
- Transport in Panama

== St Kitts and Nevis ==
The narrow-gauge (30 inches) St. Kitts Scenic Railway circles the island and offers passenger service from its headquarters near the airport, although the service is geared more for tourists than as day-to-day transportation for residents. Built between 1912 and 1926 to haul sugar cane from farms to the sugar factory in Basseterre, since 2003 the railway has offered a 3.5 hour, 30-mile circle tour of the island on specially designed double-decker open-air coaches, with 12 miles of the trip being by bus.

== United States ==
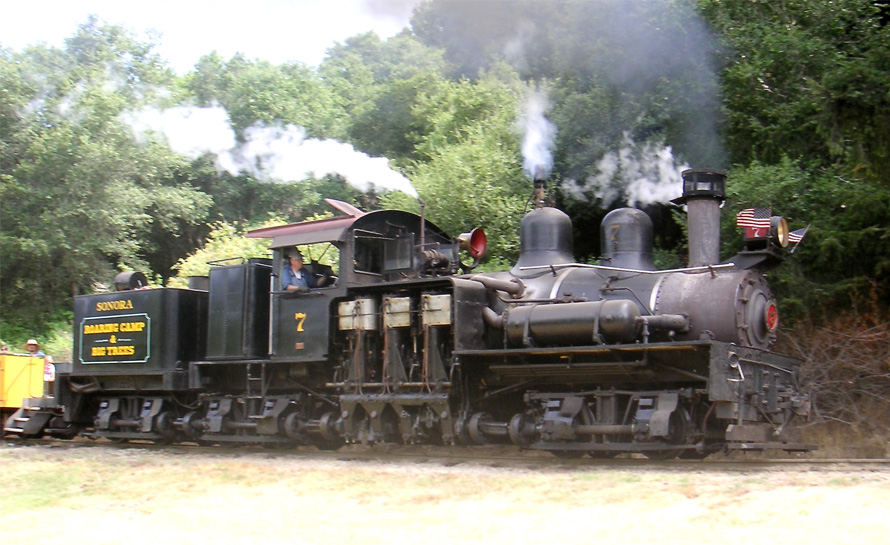
Shay logging locomotive in California

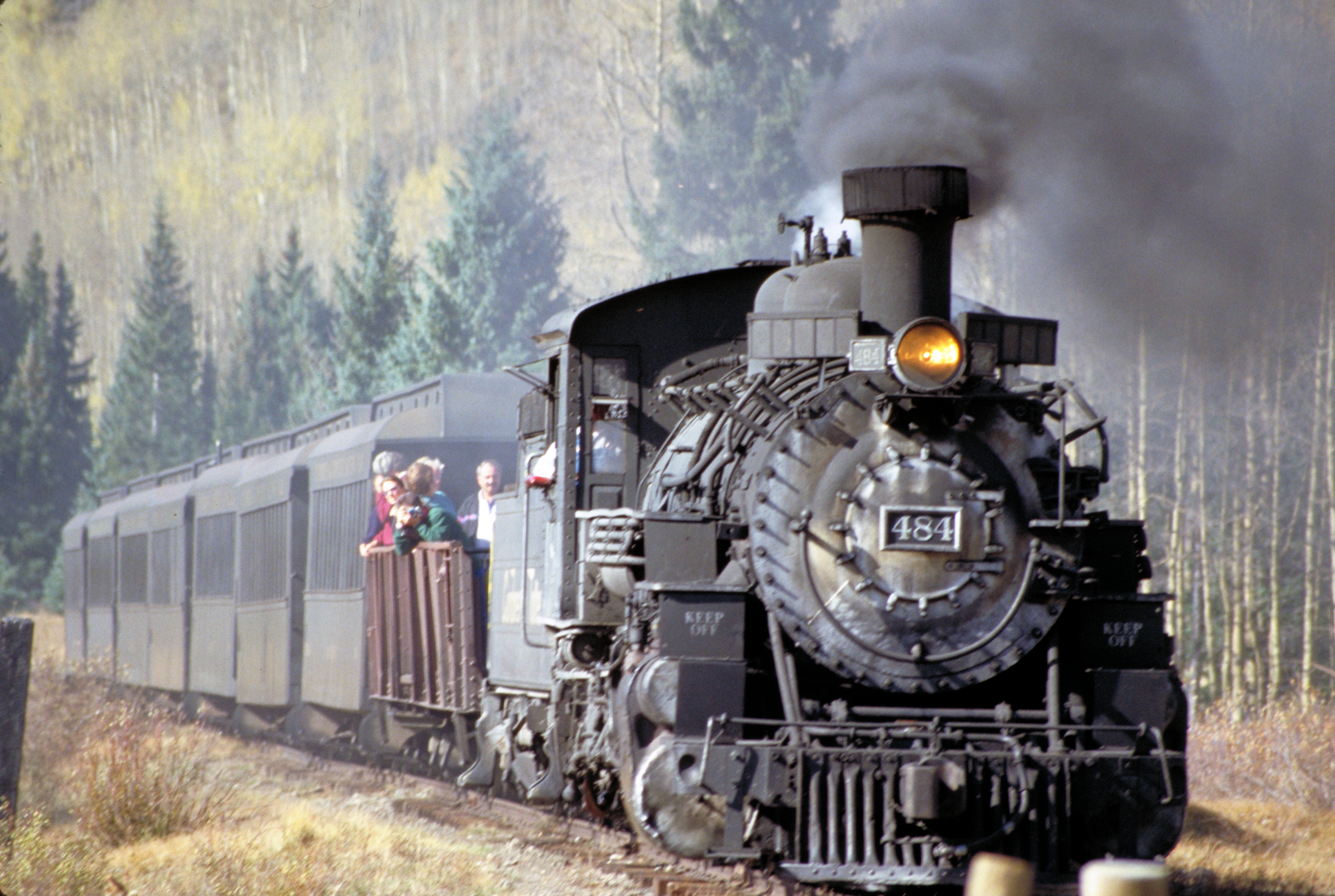
A steam locomotive of the C&TS RR

Many narrow-gauge railways were built in the United States with track gauge 3 ft (914 mm). The most extensive and well known systems were the 3 ft (914 mm) gauge lines through the Rocky Mountain states of Colorado and New Mexico.

Today a few lines survive as heritage railways and tourist attractions. USG Corporation operates an industrial 3 ft (914 mm) gauge line at Plaster City, California and narrow-gauge railways are still used for some tunneling and mining work.
