= The Iron Snake =

The Iron Snake is an ancient tribal prophecy attributed to the Maasai, Kĩkũyũ, Kamba and Kalenjin tribes in Kenya in which a railway is described as an iron snake.

== Background ==
The iron snake would someday cross their land and would be a bad omen creating trouble as it went.

The religious gikuyu prophet Mugo wa Kibiru prophesied the coming of the whites many years before they arrived on the coast. In eastern Kenya the prophecy was attributed to Masaku, a Kamba sage and chief, and Mwenda Mwea a famous medicine man as well as a seer from Embu. They both saw a black snake coming and all the cattle disappearing, plundered from the Africans by the ‘red people,’ as the early white colonizers would be known. In western Kenya, Kimnyole the Nandi Orkoiyot also predicted the arrival of Europeans (the white tribe) and the railways (the Iron Snake) who were to change everything for the Nandi.

A similar end-of-the-world myth speaking of snakes of iron appears in the Hopi tradition of the New World as the fourth sign on Hopi tablets.

== In literature ==
In 1965, Ronald Hardy published a book about the building of the East African Railroad called The Iron Snake (Collins, London).

The Iron Snake is the title of a novel about the same railroad by John Gaudet published by Brandylane Publishers, Richmond, Virginia.
