= PS Speke =

British stern wheel paddle steamer in Uganda

History

United Kingdom
- Name: PS Speke
- Namesake: English explorer John Hanning Speke
- Operator: Uganda Railway 1910–29; Kenya and Uganda Railways and Harbours 1929–48; East African Railways and Harbours Corporation 1948–62
- Route: Lake Kyoga and the Victoria Nile
- In service: 1910
- Out of service: 1962

General characteristics
- Class & type: Paddle steamer
- Type: river ferry and pusher tug, Stern wheel paddle steamer
- Tonnage: 90 tons
- Installed power: 175 IHP compound steam engine
- Propulsion: stern wheel paddle
- Capacity: 6 first class & 4 second class passengers
- Crew: 20

PS Speke was a British stern wheel paddle steamer that operated in Uganda. She was built for the Uganda Railway from 1910 until 1962 serving as an important vessel on inland waterways including Lake Kyoga and the Victoria Nile during the colonial period. First and second class passengers travelled aboard the steamer but she also pushed a barge or lighter on which cargo and third class passengers travelled.

== Construction and naming ==
Speke was built in 1910 for the Uganda Railway to provide transport on Lake Kyoga and Victoria Nile. She was a stern-wheel paddle steamer with a 175 indicated horsepower compound steam engine capable of carrying small number of passengers and a lighter cargo. The vessel was named after John Hanning Speke, the English explorer credited with being the first European to reach Lake Victoria, which he identified as the source of the Nile in 1858.

== Design and Capabilities ==
Speke was a relatively modest vessel of around 90 tons and was designed both to carry first and second-class passengers and to push barges or lighters carrying cargo and third-class passengers. The paddle steamer's stern wheel was well suited to the shallow waters and fluctuating depths of lakes and rivers in the region.

She served as part of a broader colonial network that linked rail, lake and river transport in East Africa. Speke was intended to work with the Busoga Railway which ran from Jinja to Lake Kyoga. The vessel operated a route across Lake Kyoga to Masindi from where road services connected to other transport points including Lake Albert.

== Service History ==
Although Speke began operating in 1910, the completion of the Busoga Railway was delayed until 1913. Once the railway line was complete, Speke operated the scheduled services across Lake Kyoga. She and her barges were also used to carry cotton and other export goods from plantations in the area.

In the 1920s and beyond, speke worked alongside other paddle steamers such as PS Stanley built in 1913 and PS Grant built in 1925 which were introduced to expand the inland waterway services and the Uganda Railway and its successors.

== Operation and Routes ==
Speke was bought initially to operate part of what eventually became a rail, ship and road route between the Uganda Railway and Lake Albert. The first stage of this route was the Busoga Railway between Jinja and Lake Kyoga. The original lakeside terminus for the railway was Kikundu, but when that site was found unsuitable the terminus was moved a few miles north to Namasagali. Speke was the first vessel to operate the route across Lake Kyoga to Masindi, from where Albion cars later provided a road service to Lake Albert at Butiaba.

Although Speke began operating in 1910, delays in laying railway track delayed completion of the Busoga Railway until 1913. The Uganda Railway later augmented the service by adding the stern-wheelers PS Stanley in 1913 and PS Grant in 1925. All three Lake Kyoga vessels resembled typical Mississippi steamboats of the era. After Stanley entered service, Speke and her barges were used mainly to carry cotton for export from nearby plantations.

When the railway operator's successor, the East African Railways and Harbours Corporation (EARH), completed its northern Uganda extension from Tororo to Pakwach it superseded the Victoria Nile ferry service. EARH withdrew Speke, Stanley and Grant from service in 1962 and offered Speke for sale in September of that year. The track of the Busoga Railway was lifted in 1964.

== See also ==
- Uganda Railway
- East African Railway
