= Anglo-Maasai Treaty (1904) =

1904 treaty between British East Africa and the Maasai

The Masai Agreement of 1904 was a treaty signed between the British East Africa Protectorate government and leaders of the Maasai tribe between 10 and 15 August 1904. It is often wrongly called the Anglo-Maasai Agreement, but that was not its proper name. The Maasai tribe agreed to cede possession of pastures in the Central Rift Valley Rift Valley in return for exclusive rights to two territories, a southern reserve in Kajiado and a northern reserve in Laikipia.

== Background ==
The Maasai acquired swathes of new land following success in the Iloikop Wars Wars of the 1870s, however this created problems as they were unable to successfully occupy their new territories. By the early 1880s, Kamba, Kalenjin and Kikuyu raiders were making inroads into Maasai territory, and the Maasai were struggling to protect cattle and grazing land. The period between 1884 and 1894 is referred to in Masaai tradition as "The Disaster". Around 1883, the Maasai and their cattle were ravaged by bovine disease which spread from the north and lingered for years. To augment their herds, the Maasai focused on raiding neighbouring tribes and concentrating stock amongst family and kin. Further trouble emerged in 1891 when rinderpest appeared in the Maasai herds, most likely spread from raided cattle, and spread rapidly throughout Maasai land.

In the late 1880s, the Imperial British East Africa Company (IBEAC) increasingly came into contact with the Maasai. Relations between the IBEAC and the Maasai grew close as co-operation offered benefits to both sides. In 1893 the Maasai asked Frank Hall, the IBEAC commander at Fort Smith, to mediate a truce between local Maasai and the Kikuyu and later that year, over three hundred Maasai survivors of a raid sought protection at Fort Smith. In 1895, the British government took over the possessions of the IBEAC and established the East Africa Protectorate over its former territories. The following year, they began construction of the Uganda Railway. The British, hampered by a lack of money and troops, were unable to risk antagonising the Maasai who controlled their lines of communication. The government therefore adopted a policy of appeasement towards the Maasai, employing Maasai warriors in expeditions and as security on the railway. The military protection given by the British enabled the Maasai to replenish their herds from raids on neighbouring tribes.

After 1900, the interests of the British and the Maasai began to diverge. With completion of the railway the British no longer feared their lines of communication being disrupted, taxation was introduced in the Protectorate providing the government with a regular source of income, and a permanent military force was instituted in 1902. For the Maasai, the end of the War of Morijo resulted in greater stability within their community, and cattle herds had largely been replenished. The government passed a series of controls aimed at reining in the Maasai, including forbidding cattle looting, discontinuing the policy of raising levies and issuing a strict code of conduct for punitive expeditions.

For the Protectorate government and the Foreign Office in London, the most pressing issue emerging was how to recoup its huge costs from the railway construction, and to turn the territory into a sustainable profit-making entity. For Sir Charles Eliot, then Commissioner of the Protectorate, the answer was to encourage European settlement, utilising European technologies and expertise in farming. Eliot, and a number of other officials, regarded the White Highlands as the most suitable place for European settlement, an area long utilised by certain sections of the Maasai.

Applications for land by Europeans, and Boers from South Africa, had brought the issue into focus by the early years of the twentieth century, with the East Africa Syndicate requesting 320,000 acres, Lord Delamere requesting 100,000 acres and Robert Chamberlain and A. S. Flemmer requesting 32,000 acres each. Eliot's vision was however opposed by some subordinate officers, notably Frederick Jackson and S.S. Bagge, who after talking with Maasai elders felt that whilst the grant to The East Africa Syndicate was acceptable, grants to private individuals must not encroach on the heartland of the Rift Valley Maasai and should rather be north of Nakuru and Elementeita, areas not previously inhabited by the Maasai. The controversy over these land concessions entertained by Eliot ultimately forced him to resign as Commissioner in 1904.

== Treaty ==
Despite Eliot's resignation, the government continued to entertain a land treaty with the Maasai. In the months prior to the signing of the treaty, Maasai chiefs had met with Charles Hobley at Naivasha and John Ainsworth at Nairobi to discuss a land settlement scheme for the Maasai tribe. On 10 August 1904, the Laibon of the Maasai, namely Lenana, son of Mbatian, and chief representatives from all Maasai sections within the East Africa Protectorate met with the newly appointed Commissioner of the Protectorate, Sir Donald Stewart in Nairobi.

It was agreed that the Maasai would vacate the entirety of the Rift Valley so that the government could use it for European settlement. In return the Maasai sections concerned would migrate to two new settlements, which would be reserved for their use only and to the exclusion of Europeans or other settlers. The Elburgu (Il Purko), Gekunuki (Il Keekonyokie), Loita, Damat and Laitutok sections would move to a northern reserve in Laikipia; the Kaptei, Matapatu, Ndogalani and Sigarari (all these are anglicised spellings) sections would move to a territory originally occupied by them south of Ngong and the Kisearian streams. An area was to be reserved on the slopes of Kinangop where the Maasai could carry out circumcision rites and ceremonies and Lenana and his successors would be allowed to occupy land between Nbagathi and the confluence of the Kisearian streams. The government further agreed to pay reasonable compensation to Maasai cultivators near Nairobi, and to maintain a station at Laikipia with only officers whom the Maasai know and trust.

Stewart signed the Treaty on 10 August, whilst the Maasai chiefs signed on 15 August.

== Aftermath ==
At first, large numbers of Maasai refused to move and the government had to delay the move. At a meeting at Naivasha some warriors asserted that they would rather die than leave their homesteads. Many Maasai did not move, and instead took up herding livestock for the East Africa Syndicate. Only the Purko settled permanently in the northern reserve. The Loita and Damat, after initially moving to the northern reserve, later moved south along with some Purko to the Loita Hills.

Despite the signing of the treaty, later European demands for land at Laikipia would result in a second treaty, also known as the Masai Agreement of 1911.
