= Donald William Stewart =

British military officer and administrator

Captain Sir Donald William Stewart KCMG (1860 – 1 October 1905) was a British military officer and Commissioner of the East Africa Protectorate

== Early life ==
He was born in London, the son of Sir Donald Stewart, 1st Baronet, a former Commander-in-Chief of the Indian Army.

== Career ==
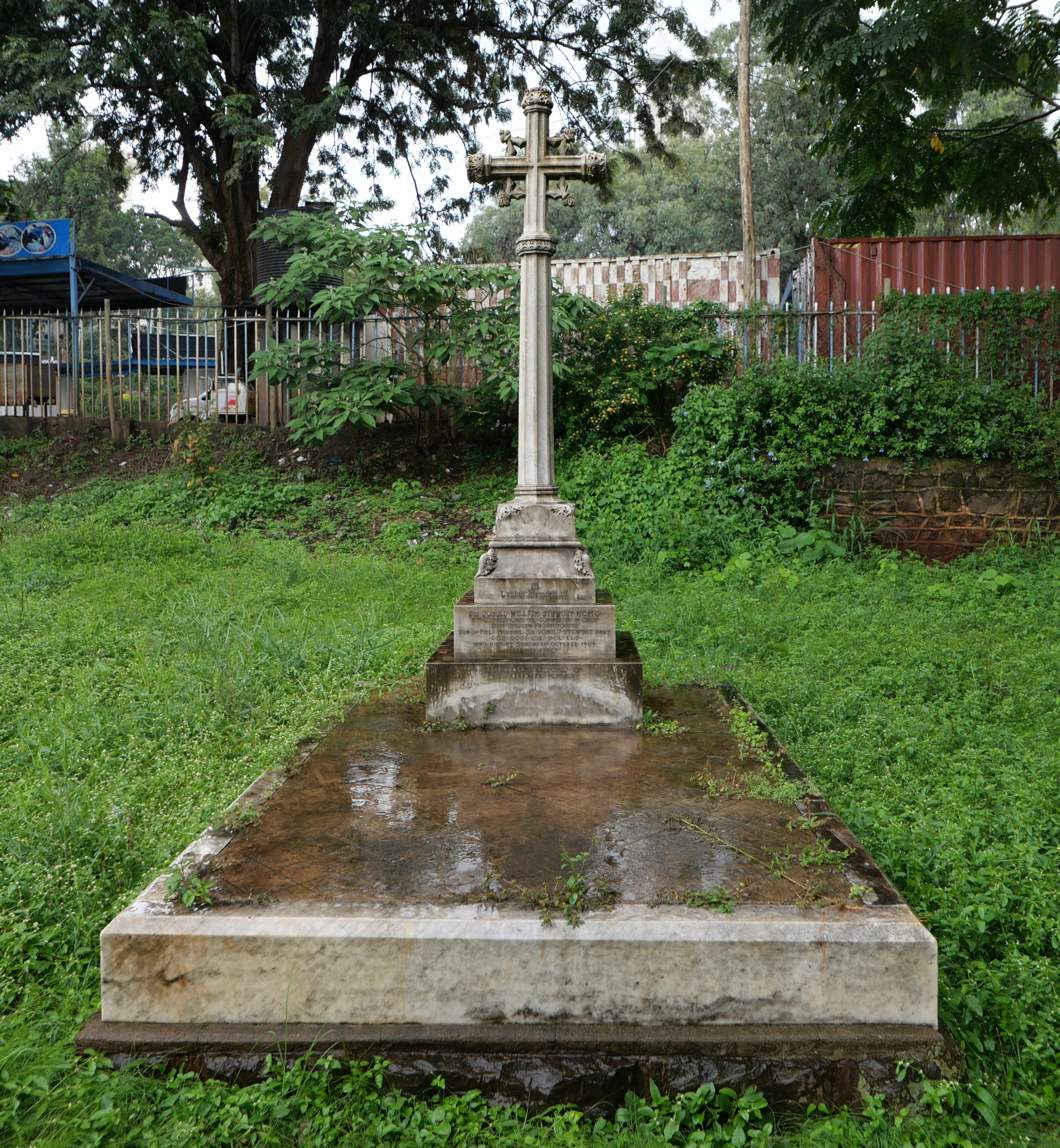
Stewart's tomb in 2024.

Stewart followed his father into the army and was commissioned with the Gordon Highlanders. He served in India and between 1879 and 1880 took part in the Second Anglo-Afghan War, during which he was severely injured. He went on to serve in the First Boer War in 1881 and the Mahdist War between 1884 and 1885. He left the army in 1888.

In 1894 he was sent to Kumasi on the Gold Coast as a political agent. In 1896 he became the first British Resident in Kumasi, and served during the Second Ashanti Expedition. He remained on the Gold Coast until August 1904, when he was made Commissioner of the East Africa Protectorate. At the beginning of his term he was involved in discussions with the Maasai over land rights and signed the First Maasai Treaty in 1904. His tenure, however, was short-lived and he died while in Nairobi from pneumonia on 1 October 1905. He is buried at Nairobi South General Cemetery.

== Personal life ==
In 1889 he met his wife Cora Howarth while in New York. They were married in London the following year, but by 1892 she had left him for another man.
