= Robert Chamberlain =

Robert Chamberlain may refer to:

- Robert Chamberlain (poet) (1607–1660), English poet and playwright
- Robert N. Chamberlain (1856–1917), American lawyer and politician in New Hampshire
- Robert H. Chamberlain (1838–1910), American law enforcement officer, sheriff of Worcester County, Massachusetts
- Robert Arthur Briggs Chamberlain (1865–1948), British settler in the East Africa Protectorate, now modern day Kenya

== See also ==
- Robert Chamberlin (1920–2013), American politician
