= Governor Byrne =

Governor Byrne may refer to:

- Brendan Byrne (1924–2018), 47th Governor of New Jersey
- Frank M. Byrne (1858–1927), 8th Governor of South Dakota
- Joseph Byrne (British Army officer) (1874–1942), Governor of the Seychelles from 1921 to 1927, Governor of Sierra Leone from 1927 to 1929 and from 1930 to 1931, and Governor of Kenya from 1931 to 1936

== See also ==
- James F. Byrnes (1882–1972), 104th Governor of South Carolina
