= List of colonial governors and administrators of Kenya =

This article contains a list of chairmen, administrators, commissioners and governors of British Kenya Colony.

The office of Governor of Kenya was replaced by the office of Governor-General in 1963 and then later replaced by a President of Kenya, upon Kenya becoming a Republic in 1964. For continuation after independence, see: List of heads of state of Kenya.

== Chairmen/Administrators of the Imperial British East Africa Company ==
No.	Name (Birth–Death)	Took office	Left office	Notes
Chairmen
1	Sir William Mackinnon (1823–1893)	3 Sep 1888	1889	
Administrators
1	George Mackenzie (1844–1910)	3 Sep 1889	May 1890	
2	Francis de Winton (1835–1901)	May 1890	Feb 1891	Proclamation forbidding dealings in land between Europeans and natives; Heligoland–Zanzibar Treaty
-	George Mackenzie (1844–1910)	Feb 1891	Jun 1891	Acting Administrator
3	Ernest Berkeley (1857–1932)	Jun 1891	Sep 1891	
4	Lloyd Mathews (1850–1901)	Sep 1891	Feb 1892	
5	Sir Gerald Portal (1858–1894)	Feb 1892	May 1893	Administration of Buganda transferred to the British Foreign Office
6	John Pigott	1893	Jul 1895	Indian Land Acquisition Act, 1894

== Commissioners and Governors of the East Africa Protectorate/Kenya ==
No.	Name (Birth–Death)	Took office	Left office	Notes
Commissioners and Governors of the East Africa Protectorate
7	Sir Arthur Henry Hardinge (1859–1933)	1 Jul 1895	7 Oct 1900	British Foreign Office assumes control of Imperial British East Africa Company territory; Construction begins of Uganda Railway; Founding of Nairobi, Port Florence
8	Trevor Ternan	7 Oct 1900	30 Dec 1900	Acting Commissioner
9	Sir Charles Eliot (1861–1931)	30 Dec 1900	20 May 1904	Uganda transfers its Eastern Province to the East Africa Protectorate; Founding of Kericho, Nakuru and Nyeri; The African Standard established; Native Civil hospital founded
10	Frederick John Jackson (1860–1929)	20 May 1904	1 Aug 1904	Acting Commissioner
11	Sir Donald William Stewart (1860–1905)	1 Aug 1904	1 Oct 1905	First Maasai Treaty; Administration transferred from Foreign Office to Colonial Office
10	Frederick John Jackson (1860–1929)	1 Oct 1905	12 Dec 1905	Commissioner
12	Sir James Hayes Sadler (1827–1910)	12 Dec 1905	12 Apr 1909	Government House built; Office of Commissioner replaced with office of Governor; Establishment of Legislative Council of Kenya; Legislative Council publishes Report of the Land Commission; Colonial office accepts principle that White Highlands be reserved for European settlement; Capital moved from Mombasa to Nairobi
13	Sir Charles Calvert Bowring (1872–1945)	12 Apr 1909	16 Sep 1909	
14	Sir Percy Girouard (1867–1932)	16 Sep 1909	17 Jul 1912	Second Maasai Treaty
13	Sir Charles Calvert Bowring (1872–1945)	17 Jul 1912	3 Oct 1912	Acting Governor
15	Sir Henry Conway Belfield (1855–1923)	3 Oct 1912	14 Apr 1917	Founding of Eldoret; Crown Lands Ordinance passed; East African Campaign begins as part of First World War
13	Sir Charles Calvert Bowring (1872–1945)	14 Apr 1917	1 Feb 1919	Acting Governor
16	Sir Edward Northey (1868–1953)	1 Feb 1919	11 Jun 1920	Franchise extended to European women; First general election held
Governors of The Colony and Protectorate of Kenya
16	Sir Edward Northey (1868–1953)	11 Jun 1920	28 Aug 1922	East Africa Protectorate renamed The Colony and Protectorate of Kenya.; 10 mile coastal strip under the domain of the Sultan of Zanzibar becomes a Protectorate.; Founding of Reform Party
17	Sir Robert Coryndon (1870–1925)	31 Aug 1922	10 Feb 1925	Devonshire White Paper; Franchise extended to Indians and Arabs.
18	Edward Brandis Denham (1876–1938)	10 Feb 1925	3 Oct 1925	Acting Governor; Jubaland ceded to Italian Somaliland
19	Edward Grigg (1879–1955)	3 Oct 1925	27 Sep 1930	Native Lands Trust Ordinance; Rudolf Province ceded from Uganda; Coryndon Museum opened; Health care established for all races (by Joan Grigg)
20	Sir Henry Monck-Mason Moore (1887–1964)	27 Sep 1930	13 Feb 1931	Governor
21	Sir Joseph Byrne (1874–1942)	13 Feb 1931	22 Dec 1936	
22	Sir Armigel Wade (1880–1966)	22 Dec 1936	6 Apr 1937	Governor
23	Sir Robert Brooke-Popham (1878–1953)	6 Apr 1937	9 Jan 1940	
24	Walter Harragin (1890–1966)	30 Sep 1939	9 Jan 1940	Acting Governor
20	Sir Henry Monck-Mason Moore (1887–1964)	9 Jan 1940	25 Oct 1944	Founding of Kenya African Union
25	Sir Philip Mitchell (1890–1964)	11 Dec 1944	21 Jun 1952	East African High Commission established; Nairobi National Park established
26	Henry Steven Potter (1904–1976)	21 Jun 1952	29 Sept 1952	Acting Governor
27	Sir Evelyn Baring (1903–1973)	30 Sept 1952	4 Oct 1959	Mau Mau Uprising begins; The Lyttleton Constitution; Franchise extended to Africans; Nairobi Embakasi Airport opened
28	Walter Coutts (1912–1988)	4 Oct 1959	23 Oct 1959	Acting Governor
29	Sir Patrick Muir Renison (1911–1965)	23 Oct 1959	17 Nov 1962	Mau Mau Uprising ends; Founding of Kenya African National Union and Kenya African Democratic Union
30	Sir Eric Griffith-Jones (1913–1979)	17 Nov 1962	4 Jan 1963	Acting Governor
31	Malcolm MacDonald (1901–1981)	4 Jan 1963	12 Dec 1964	Kenya becomes an independent Dominion within the Commonwealth.; MacDonald becomes Governor-General of Kenya (only holder of the post) on 12 December 1963 and replaced exactly a year later.; Jomo Kenyatta elected first Prime Minister of Kenya.; Sultan of Zanzibar cedes 10 miles coastal strip to Kenya.; State of Emergency in North Eastern Province; Constitution of Kenya (Amendment Bill) passed; Kenya becomes a republic, with Jomo Kenyatta becoming the first President of Kenya. Kenya remains part of the Commonwealth.

== See also ==
- Kenya
  - List of heads of state of Kenya
  - Prime Minister of Kenya
  - Deputy President of Kenya
- Lists of office-holders
