= Governor Wade =

Governor Wade may refer to:

- Thomas Francis Wade (1818–1895), Acting Governor of Cape Colony from 1833 to 1834
- Armigel Wade (1880–1966), Acting Governor of Kenya in 1935 and from 1936 to 1937
