= Robert Arthur Briggs Chamberlain =

British settler (b. 1865, d. 1948)

Robert Arthur Briggs Chamberlain (31 January 1865 – 4 February 1948) was an early British settler in the East Africa Protectorate, now modern day Kenya.

== Early life and career ==
Chamberlain was born in 1865 in Hull, Yorkshire, England. He was educated at Trent College in Nottingham and King's College, Cambridge. After leaving Cambridge he also studied at the University of Heidelberg and University of Tübingen in Germany. On his return to England, he studied law at Inner Temple.

Chamberlain gave up a career in law, instead becoming a journalist with the Manchester Guardian and various London newspapers. Shortly before the Boer War broke out he went to South Africa as editor of the Johannesburg Star. His staunch opposition to the importation of Chinese labour for the Rand gold mines was so unpopular that he resigned his editorship of the Star. Following the war he became a vocal critic of Britain's handling of the war and the postwar physical hardship and psychological discontent it created.

== East Africa ==
In June 1903 Chamberlain visited the East Africa Protectorate with a scheme to re-settle 100 South African farmers and with a guarantee of 500,000 acres in the White Highlands. Whilst there, with his colleague A.S. Flemmer, he applied for his own 32,000 acre land grant in the Rift Valley. The grant was initially approved by Sir Charles Eliot, Commissioner of the Protectorate, but was later cancelled by the British Foreign Secretary, Lord Lansdowne. The controversy surrounding to the grant ultimately led to Eliot's resignation in June 1904. Despite this setback Chamberlain pressed his claim, appealing first to Viscount Milner, then High Commissioner for Southern Africa, and subsequently the Colonial Office. In November 1907, Winston Churchill, as Colonial Under-Secretary, advised his superior Lord Elgin, the Secretary of State for the Colonies, that the grant should be carried out according to Eliot's terms. Chamberlain therefore acquired 32,000 acres. He became a prominent farmer and voice amongst the early European settler community and played a key role encouraging European farmers into Kenya, particularly from South Africa. He was also active in politics, and instrumental in establishing the Convention of Associations in 1911. His wife Lavinia died in 1920, and he continued to farm his vast acreage until the late 1920s when he sold most of his holding.

== Death ==
Chamberlain died at his Oldobeye Estate in Elmenteita on 4 February 1948. He was survived by his second wife Janet and is buried at Nakuru North Cemetery.
