= Joseph Byrne (British Army officer) =

British colonial governor (1874–1942)

Brigadier-General Sir Joseph Byrne GCMG KBE CB
- Byrne in 1935

Governor of Kenya
- In office 13 February 1931 – 22 December 1936
- Monarchs: George V (1931–36); Edward VIII (1936); George VI (1936)
- Preceded by: Henry Monck-Mason Moore
- Succeeded by: Armigel Wade

Governor of Sierra Leone
- In office 1930 – 23 May 1931
- Preceded by: Mark Aitchison Young (acting)
- Succeeded by: Sir Arnold Hodson
- In office 24 September 1927 – 1929
- Preceded by: Sir Ransford Slater
- Succeeded by: Mark Aitchison Young (acting)

Governor of the Seychelles
- In office 1922–1927
- Preceded by: Sir Eustace Fiennes
- Succeeded by: Sir Malcolm Stevenson

Inspector-General of the Royal Irish Constabulary
- In office 1 August 1916 – 6 January 1920

Personal details
- Born: 2 October 1874
- Died: 13 November 1942 (aged 68)
- Education: St George's College, Weybridge
- Civilian awards: Knight Grand Cross of the Order of St Michael and St George; Knight Commander of the Order of the British Empire

Military service
- Allegiance: United Kingdom
- Branch/service: British Army
- Years of service: 1893–1916
- Rank: Brigadier-General
- Battles/wars: Second Boer War; First World War
- Military awards: Companion of the Order of the Bath

Brigadier-General Sir Joseph Aloysius Byrne, GCMG, KBE, CB (2 October 1874 – 13 November 1942) was a British Army officer who served as Inspector-General of the Royal Irish Constabulary from 1916 until 1920. He later served in Sierra Leone, Seychelles and Kenya.

== Early life and military career ==
Byrne was born on 2 October 1874, the son of Dr J. Byrne, Deputy Lieutenant for County Londonderry. He was educated at St George's College, Weybridge.

Byrne joined the Royal Inniskilling Fusiliers and was commissioned a second lieutenant on 23 December 1893, then promoted to lieutenant on 1 June 1897. After the outbreak of war in South Africa in October 1899, Byrne was with the 1st Battalion of his regiment as it arrived in Durban for war service later the same year. The regiment soon saw heavy fighting, and Byrne was wounded at the Siege of Ladysmith, following which he returned home on the hospital ship Maine in March 1900. Promoted to captain on 11 April 1900, he was stationed at the regimental depot. He returned to South Africa, and continued to serve during the remainder of the war, but was invalided home in March 1902. He was temporary appointed to a staff appointment in July 1902.

Byrne later served as Assistant Adjutant-General at the War Office and was made Deputy Adjutant-General, Irish Command, on 27 April 1916, during the Easter Rising as brigadier-general. He was appointed Inspector General of the Royal Irish Constabulary on 1 August 1916. Byrne held the position of Inspector-General until 6 January 1920.

== Colonial Service ==
Following his police service Byrne was called to the Bar, Lincoln's Inn, London, in 1921. Later that year he entered the Colonial Service and in 1922 was appointed Governor of the Seychelles. Thereafter he was made Governor of Sierra Leone from 24 September 1927 to 1929, and again from 1930 to 23 May 1931. He was briefly indisposed from late 1929 until early 1930, during which time Mark Aitchison Young filled in for him as acting governor. As governor of Sierra Leone, Byrne made a habit of appointing European-educated Africans to as many posts as possible, particularly in the city of Freetown. The football club of East End Lions F.C. was established in Sierra Leone while he was governor.

In 1931 Byrne was made Governor of Kenya. His time in Kenya coincided with the worldwide depression, and his government undertook various austerity measures. Despite this, he took steps to support European settler agriculture and increased funding for African peasant production. He also oversaw upgrades to hospital and prison facilities in Nairobi and Mombasa. His lack of sympathy towards the European settlers, and implementation of an income tax long opposed by many settlers, meant he was an unpopular figure in sections of the settler community.

Byrne retired in 1936, and died on 13 November 1942 in Surrey, England.

== Personal life ==
Byrne married in 1908, Marjorie, daughter of Allan F. Joseph, of Cairo. She died 19 November 1960.

== Honours ==
Byrne was appointed a Companion of the Order of the Bath (CB) in 1917 in recognition of war service, and a Knight Commander of the Order of the British Empire (KBE) in the 1918 Birthday Honours, again for war service. He was appointed a Knight Commander of the Order of St Michael and St George (KCMG) in the 1928 Birthday Honours, and promoted to Knight Grand Cross of the Order (GCMG) in the 1934 New Year Honours.

Government offices
Preceded by Sir Eustace Fiennes	Governor of the Seychelles; 1922–1927	Succeeded by Sir Malcolm Stevenson
Preceded by Henry Monck-Mason Moore	Governor of Kenya; 1931–1936	Succeeded by Armigel Wade
