= List of cemeteries in Kenya =

Cemeteries in Kenya

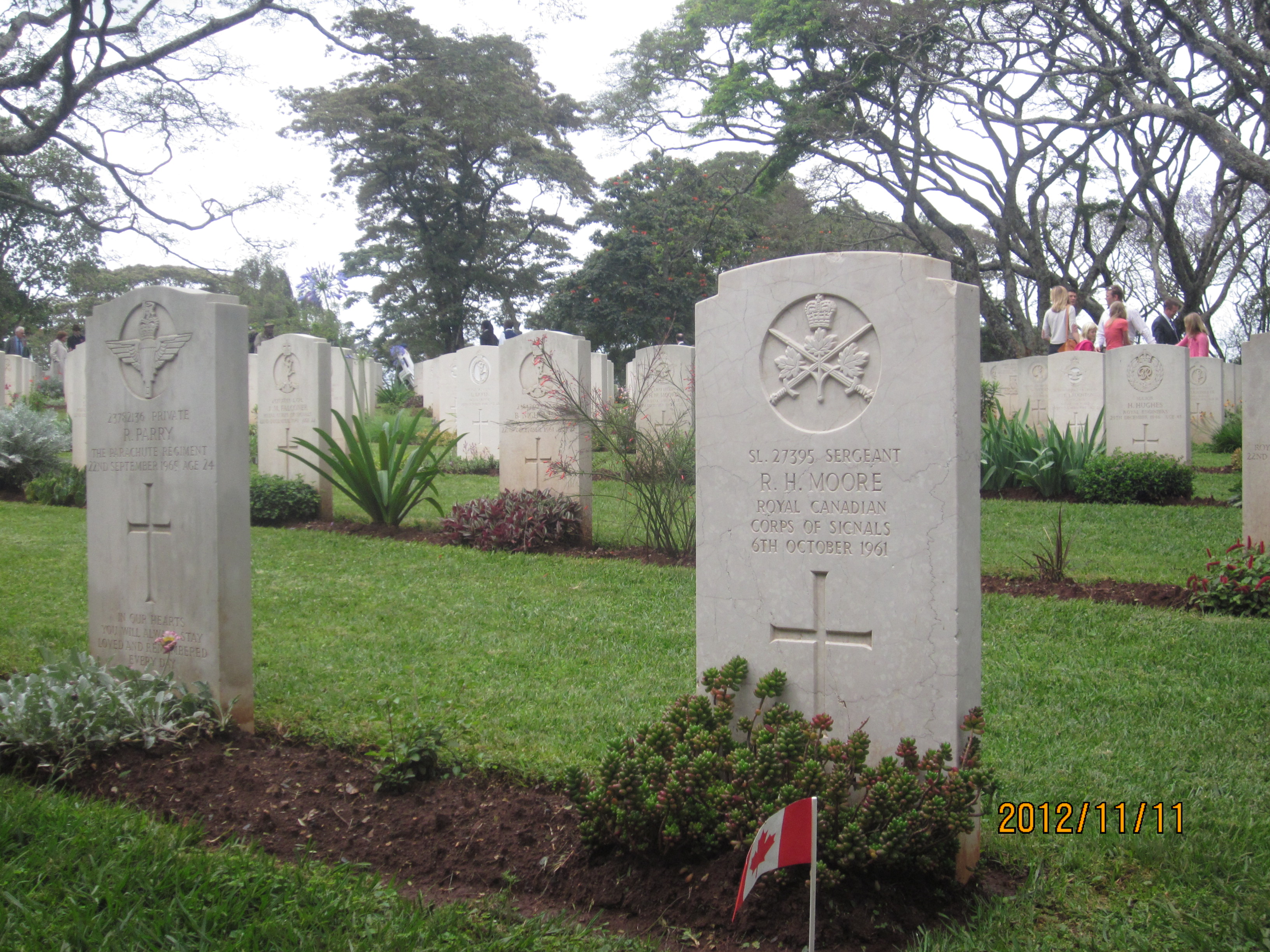
Nairobi War Cemetery

This is a list of cemeteries in Kenya.

== Malindi ==
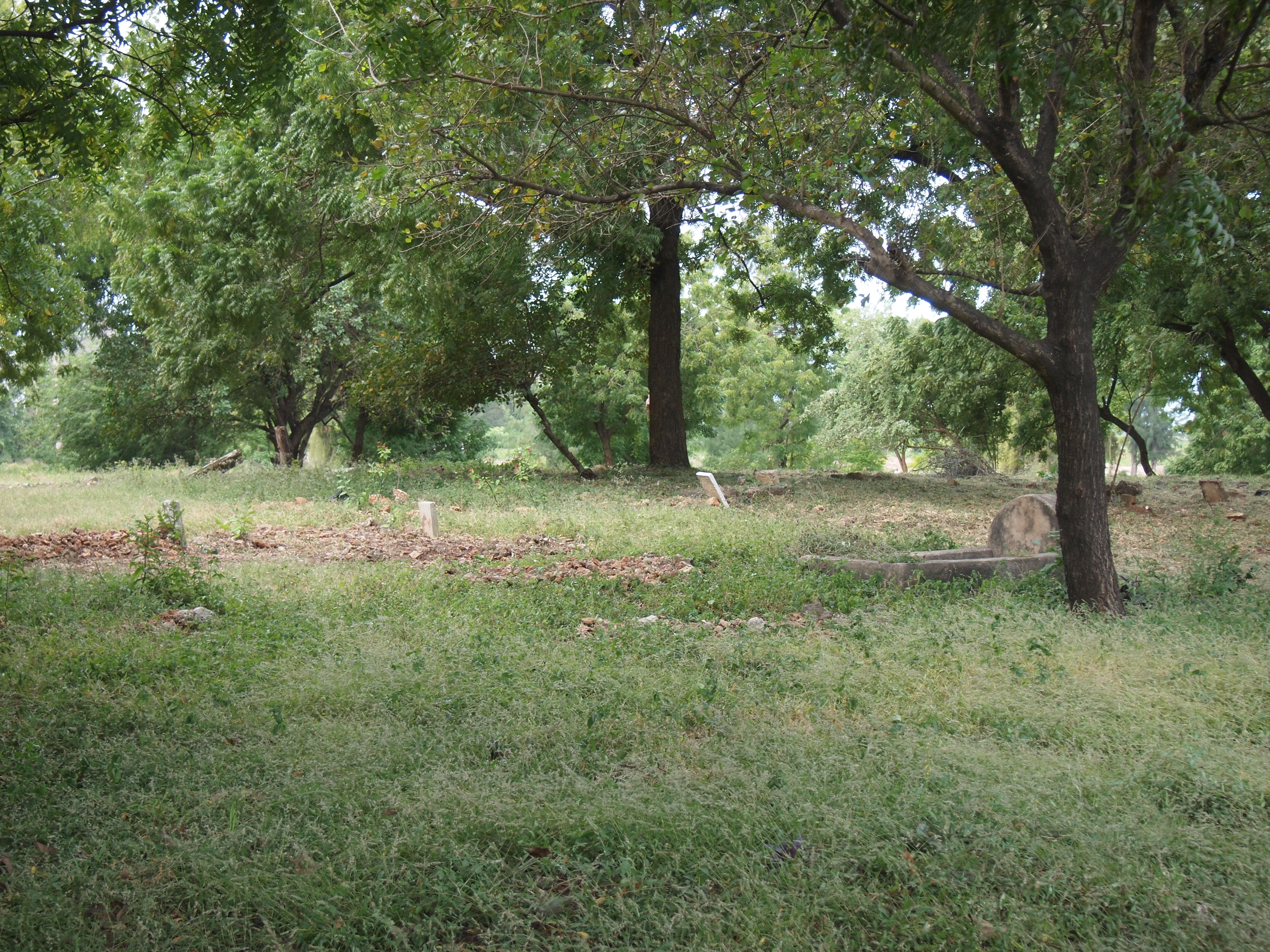
Malindi Islamic Cemetery

- Islamic Cemetery in Malindi

== Nairobi ==
- Bohra Cemetery – serving the Bohra community
- City Park Cemetery
- Jewish Cemetery Forest Road
- Nairobi Muslim Cemetery
- Nairobi South Cemetery
- Nairobi South Jewish Cemetery (old Jewish cemetery)
- Nairobi War Cemetery
- St Austin's Mission Cemetery, Mũthangari

== Nakuru ==
- Gilgil War Cemetery
- Nakuru North Cemetery
- Nakuru South Cemetery
- Gilgil Cemetery
- Naivasha Cemetery
- Longonot Cemetery
- Molo Cemetery
- Njoro Cemetery
- Bahati Cemetery

== Nyeri ==
- Baden-Powell grave at St Peter's Cemetery
- Nyeri War Cemetery

== Great Rift Valley ==
- Lothagam North Pillar Site
