= Ernest James Lennox Berkeley =

British military officer and administrator

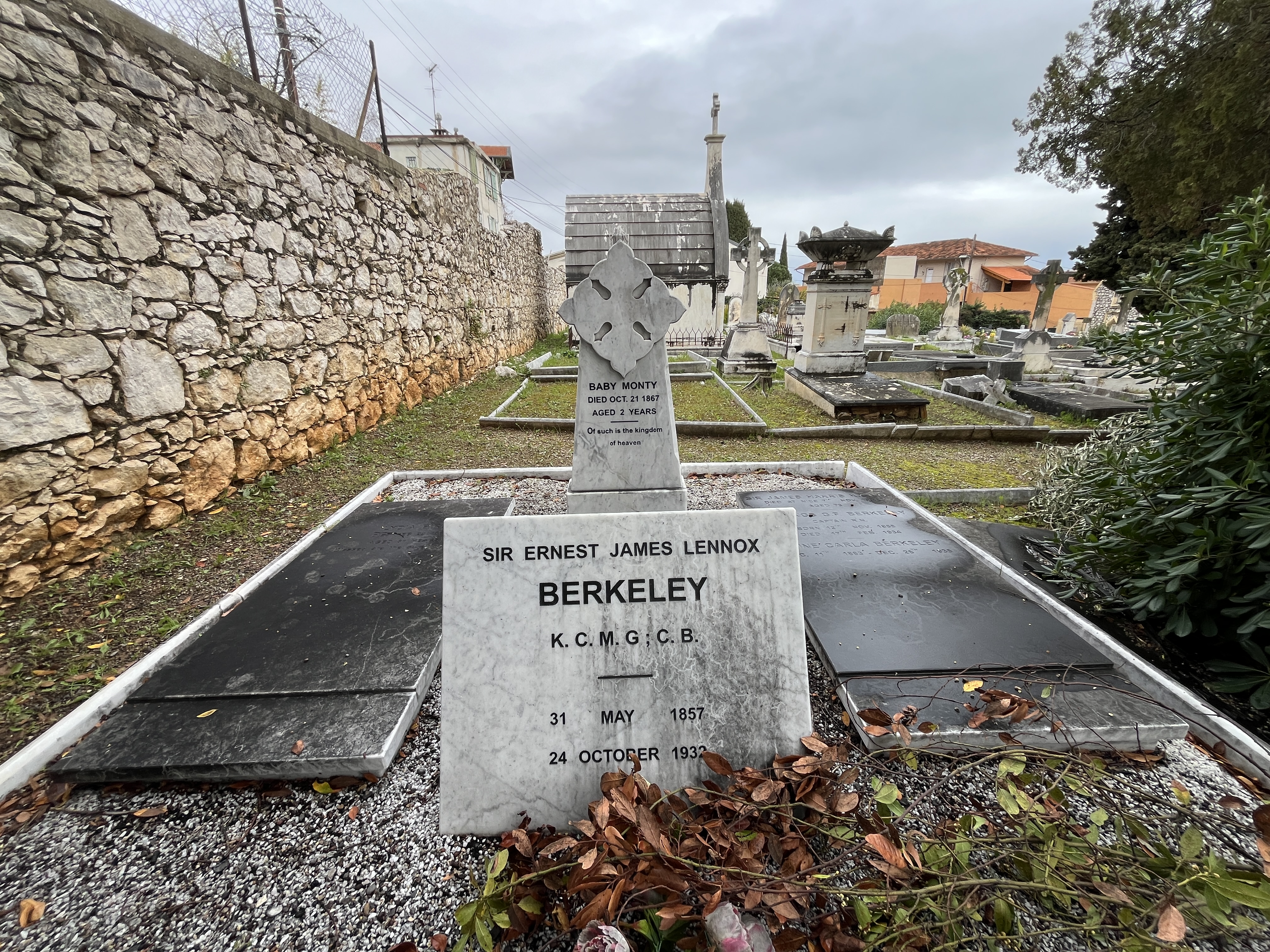
Grave of Sir Ernest James Lennox Berkeley at Ste-Marguerite cemetery in Nice (France-06)

Sir Ernest James Lennox Berkeley KCMG (31 May 1857 – 24 October 1932) was a British military officer and administrator, who served as the British Consul-General for Uganda 1894 to 1899 and Tunis between 1899 and 1920.

== Early life ==
Berkeley was born illegitimately, the son of George Lennox Rawdon Berkeley, 7th Earl of Berkeley and Cécile Drummond. He was educated at Royal Academy School in Gosport and the Royal Military Academy, Sandhurst.

== Career ==
In 1876 he was commissioned into the British Army, becoming first a sub-lieutenant in the 57th Foot and the following year he transferred to the 60th Rifles. He resigned from the army in September 1877.

After leaving the army, he pursued a career in political service, and in 1885 he became the British Vice Consul for East Africa. He subsequently passed examinations and in 1891 was appointed Consul for Zanzibar. He simultaneously acted as Administrator of the Imperial British East Africa Company's territories between 1891 and 1892. He was appointed as the British Commissioner and Consul-General for Uganda between 1895 and 1899. He thereafter left East Africa, when he was made Consul-General for Tunis in the French protectorate of Tunisia between 1899 and 1920. He was made a Companion of the Bath in 1897 and Knight Commander of the Order of St Michael and St George in 1921.

== Death ==
He died on 24 October 1932 aged 75.

== Family ==
His fraternal nephew was Sir Lennox Randal Frances Berkeley CBE, composer and associate of Benjamin Britten.
