= George Sutherland Mackenzie =

British explorer and businessman

George Sutherland Mackenzie KCMG
- Born: May 5, 1844; Bolarum, British India
- Died: November 1, 1910 (aged 66); London, United Kingdom
- Occupations: Businessman and explorer

Sir George Sutherland Mackenzie KCMG (5 May 1844 – 1 November 1910) was a British businessman and explorer.

== Early life ==
He was born in Bolarum, British India the son of Sir William Mackenzie, inspector-general of the Madras medical service and his wife Margaret. He was educated in Clapham.

== Career ==
In 1868 he left his job as a clerk in Dingwall to join Gray Paul & Co. He was sent to learn the piece-goods trade in Manchester and Calcutta before moving to Bushire in Persia. In 1870 he was sent to Basra to open a branch of the firm there.

In 1888, the Imperial British East Africa Company, of which he was a member was granted a Royal Charter and the following year he sailed to Zanzibar to assume the role of its administrator, effectively its managing director. By way of developing East Africa he introduced Persian agriculturists, improved Mombasa town and harbour, sent caravans into the interior as far as Uganda, and worked on the organisation of the territory. He also assisted the Italians in negotiating treaties with the Somali tribe, and received the grand cross of the crown of Italy in consideration of his service

He ceased to be administrator in May 1890 and returned to England. He later returned to east Africa as acting-administrator for a few months in 1891.

== Recognition ==
He was made a Companion of the Bath in 1897 and Knight Commander of the Order of St Michael and St George in 1902 for services to Persia. He also held the Grand Cross of the Order of the Brilliant Star of Zanzibar. He was a member of the council of the Royal Geographical Society between 1893–1909 and vice-president 1901-1905.

== Death ==
He died suddenly in London on 1 November 1910, and was buried at Brookwood cemetery.
