= Nakuru North Cemetery =

Cemetery in Nakuru, Kenya

Details
- Location: Nakuru
- Country: Kenya
- Coordinates: 0.27831°S 36.07359°E
- Find a Grave: Nakuru North Cemetery

Nakuru North Cemetery is a cemetery in Nakuru, Kenya and is one of the oldest in the country. In addition to civilian interments the cemetery also contains Commonwealth war graves from both the First World War (27 burials) and the Second World War (45 burials), as well as two non-war CWGC burials. It is located near to Nakuru Goods railway station.

A number of the First World War burials date from November 1918 and were from convalescent camps at Nakuru. There was a Royal Air Force flight training school nearby during the Second World War. The cemetery was later opened up to the public. The cemetery has been full since 2010. Plans have been suggested to turn the cemetery into a recreational park.

== Notable interments ==
- Robert Arthur Briggs Chamberlain
