= 1899 famine in central Kenya =

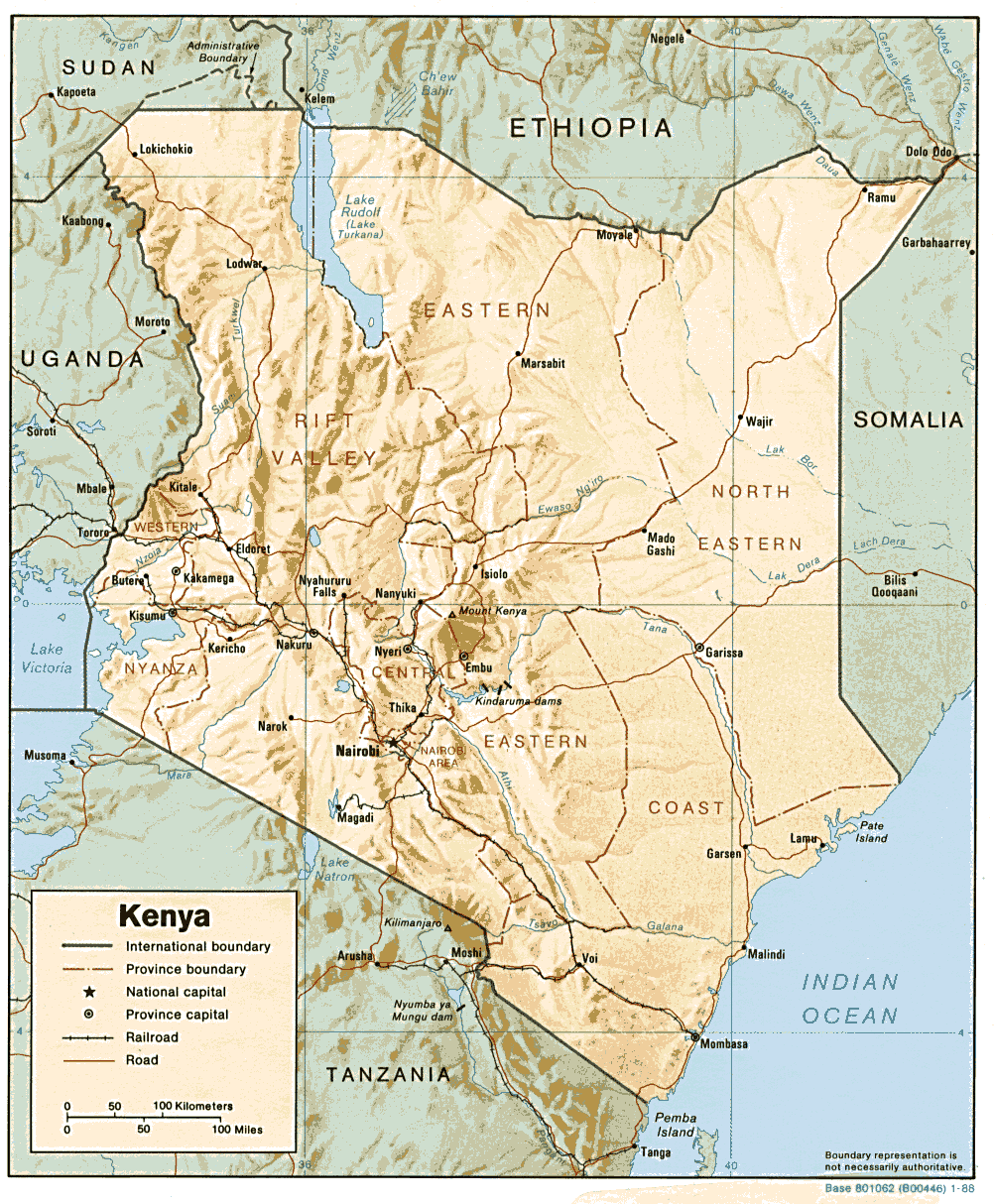
Map of Kenya

The famine in central Kenya in 1899 is regarded as a devastating catastrophe in Kenyan history. It spread rapidly from 1898 in the central region of the country around Mount Kenya after several consecutive years of low rainfall. The prevalence of locusts, cattle diseases that decimated the livestock population and the growing demand for food from travelling caravans of British, Swahili and Arab traders also contributed to the food shortage. The famine was accompanied by a smallpox epidemic that resulted in the depopulation of entire regions.

The number of victims is unknown, but estimates by the few European observers ranged between 50 and 90 per cent of the population. All people living in these regions were affected, albeit to varying degrees.

The famine occurred concurrently with the establishment of British colonial rule, which led the inhabitants of central Kenya to not perceive it as a consequence of natural causes. Instead, they regarded it as a manifestation of a universal crisis that disrupted the balance between God and society, and which also manifested itself in colonial rule.

== Central Kenya at the end of the 19th century ==
=== Social organisation ===
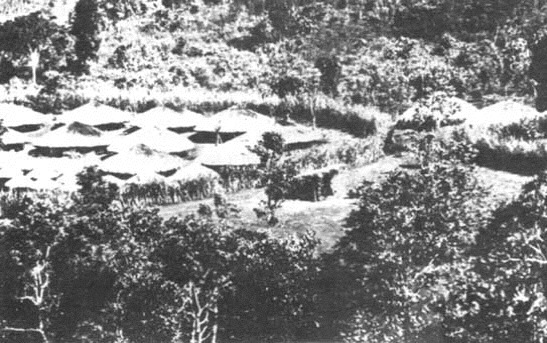
A fortified village in the Nyandarua forests. Such villages with an enclosure were particularly common in the border areas of the region inhabited by the Kikuyu.

By the end of the 19th century, Central Kenya was already a densely populated region due to its fertile soils and the rainy climate, especially in the highlands. In addition to the area around Lake Victoria, this region was the most populous in British East Africa, with an estimated population of approximately one million individuals. The high-lying area between Mount Kenya and the Ngong Hills was predominantly populated by Kikuyu, Embu, Meru, Mbeere and Ogiek communities. To the east, the lower-lying region merged into the semi-arid steppe and was primarily inhabited by Kamba groups. To the south of the Ngong and west of the Nyandarua Mountains, Kikuyu, Ogiek and Maasai inhabited the area. The inhabitants of the fertile highlands primarily relied on agriculture as a source of livelihood, whereas those inhabiting the arid steppes mainly engaged in cattle farming.

In contrast with the cartographic representation of these groups on maps produced during the 20th century, the evidence suggests that they did not inhabit territories that were clearly delineated. In contrast, they were culturally and socially closely intertwined. Except for the Nilotic language Maa, their languages were Bantu languages and therefore closely related. However, aside from language, the members of the same language group exhibited minimal shared characteristics. They were not unified by a common political authority and only sporadically by common rituals. It would be inaccurate to describe the ethnic identity as we know it today as a pronounced phenomenon. For instance, membership of the Maasai community could be renounced through relocation or a change of livelihood, such as from cattle breeding to agriculture.

People lived in small communities, organised in clans, family or village groups. Such groups could also be made up of people from different linguistic backgrounds. They were often organised around a patron, an influential head of family who knew how to bind people to him or her by offering them protection within the community. These communities typically identified themselves by their geographical location, the founder of their community, who was mostly identified as a common, sometimes mythical, ancestor, or their way of life, which often involved farming, hunting, or cattle breeding. Hostilities between different units of the same language group occurred with the same frequency as between members of different ethnic groups.

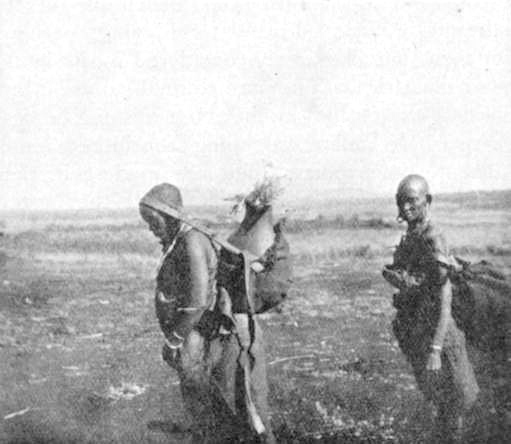
Women with goods in central Kenya, around 1895. The calabash probably contains beer, a good traditionally traded by women

=== Regional exchange and contact ===
Despite the linguistic boundaries, these small communities maintained active communication and trade. They often intermarried and influenced each other's way of life, especially in areas where they lived together as neighbours. This contact was essential for the survival of the local population. The fertile highlands acted as the breadbasket of the entire region. In the event of food shortages in individual areas due to drought, people would undertake trading trips to the highlands. These trips would involve the exchange of livestock, including goats, sheep and cattle, as well as arrow poisons and tobacco. Tools and weapons, metals, salt and medicinal herbs, honey and even labour would also be traded for foodstuffs such as millet and yams, beans, maize and bananas. In times of need, entire families would immigrate to the highlands, where they would live and work on the land of a wealthy farmer, thus ensuring their survival during the hardship.

Furthermore, individual regions in the south of this area maintained a vibrant exchange with the large caravans travelling inland from the East African coast to purchase ivory. In central Kenya, several trading hubs emerged, where intermediaries procured food from the local population and resold it to the large caravans as provisions for their onward journey.

=== Lack of rain, cattle plague and locust infestations ===
In the majority of East African regions, the 1880s and 1890s were characterised by irregular and scarce rainfall patterns. The drought in central Kenya was ultimately caused by a strong occurrence of the climatic phenomenon La Niña in 1898. This event, in conjunction with a particularly strong occurrence of El Niño in 1896 and another El Niño in 1899, also resulted in drought and food insecurity in other regions of Africa. In addition to the aforementioned climatic factors, the central Kenyan region was also affected by some other adverse conditions. In the 1890s, swarms of locusts devastated the already poor harvests in both barren and fertile areas due to the lack of rain.

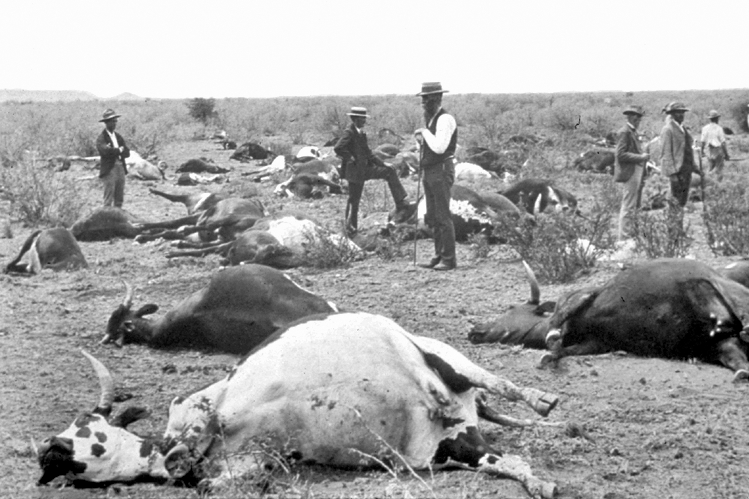
Rinderpest outbreak in Africa at the end of the 19th century

Furthermore, an epizootic of cattle plague had already devastated a significant portion of the cattle population in 1891. This animal disease, which originated in Asia, was introduced to Ethiopia by Italian troops with Indian cattle in 1887. It subsequently spread from there to East Africa and finally to Southern Africa, where there was no immunity to it. The loss of livestock among cattle owners in Kenya was estimated to be as high as 90%. The loss of cattle had a profound impact on the region. The consumption of their meat was infrequent. Cattle were regarded as a valuable object of prestige and were frequently used as a form of bride-wealth and as a means of purchasing food from fertile regions. In pastoral societies, the loss of cattle had a significant impact on the diet of children and young adults. They were largely fed on a milk and blood mixture with herbs, with the blood drawn from the carotid artery of the cow.

The Maasai, a pastoralist society in which cattle breeding was a central element, were particularly adversely affected by the consequences. Following the destruction of their economic foundation, thousands perished and entire communities disintegrated. Those who survived sought refuge primarily with the neighbouring Kikuyu. During this period, there was a notable increase in hostilities and the use of violence. The cattle plague transformed the hitherto proud and feared Maasai into beggars, and they attempted to halt the social decline by engaging in large-scale cattle and women theft from neighbouring villages to rebuild their households.

=== Heralds of colonial power ===
Flag of the Imperial British East Africa Company, which advanced into the interior of Kenya from 1888 onwards

The initial endeavours of the British colonial power to establish a foothold in Kenya were a significant contributing factor to the subsequent disasters. From 1889, the Imperial British East Africa Company established several administrative posts along the existing trade route from the harbour town of Mombasa to Lake Victoria. German influence in the region had ended by 1890, following the handover of Witu. Their objective was to provide the company's extensive trading caravans, which could comprise up to a thousand individuals, with sustenance for their subsequent journey. To this end, substantial quantities of food were procured from the local population, on occasion by force. Furthermore, the caravan traffic facilitated the dissemination of previously unknown diseases, such as rinderpest.

Nevertheless, the initial influence of the British was relatively modest, confined to a select number of stations and a limited radius. This changed with the construction of the railway. Following the acquisition of British East Africa by Great Britain in 1895, construction of the Uganda Railway commenced in 1896 intending to establish a railway line connecting Mombasa with Uganda. As the completed line progressed, the country became increasingly accessible to Europeans, who were able to reach the inland areas. By 1899, the railway had reached Nairobi, which had been constructed in 1896 as a depot for building materials and thus also the southern Kikuyu territory in central Kenya. The number of Europeans in the country consequently increased exponentially, with settlers, administrators, missionaries, adventurers, businessmen and scientists all arriving in significant numbers.

For the Africans, railway construction had a further dimension. From the commencement of construction in 1896, it attracted a considerable number of workers to the extensive building sites. They hired themselves out as labourers to earn money to purchase European trade goods, which were highly sought-after and in great demand. These included cotton fabrics and clothing, tobacco tins, firearms and pearls. The majority of these railway workers were Indian contract labourers, but Africans from all over East Africa also worked on the railway, including many from central Kenya. The predominantly male labour force employed by the railway wasn't able to tend to agriculture, which further diminished crop yields.

== Great Famine ==
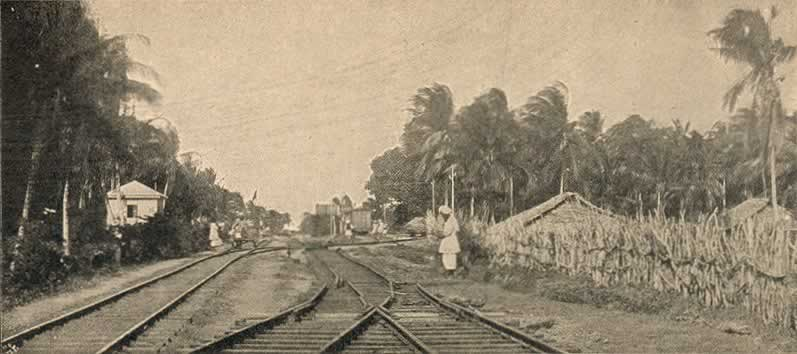
The newly built line of the Uganda Railway

The Great Famine, as it was subsequently designated, disseminated throughout the Kenyan population in the latter half of the 1890s. Its impact was felt across the entire region extending from Mount Kenya to Kilimanjaro. By the end of 1897, harvests in the lower-lying eastern regions were already poor, even in areas that were typically able to produce food surpluses. The year 1898 began with a further period of drought, which resulted in the spread of famine to the southern regions. A plague of locusts and a renewed outbreak of cattle plague, which resulted in the death of approximately 30% of the cattle population, further exacerbated the effects of insufficient rainfall. By the middle of 1898, the number of deaths resulting from hunger had reached a significant proportion of the population. Rainfall that year occurred at a later time and in smaller quantities than usual. Finally, the crops in the eastern highlands and the southern Kikuyu region, which had previously been irrigated, began to dry up in the fields.

Nevertheless, the food shortage in central Kenya had not yet reached its full extent by mid-1898. Traders continued to sell food supplies from the highlands to passing caravans or to middlemen in order to acquire goods that were highly sought after, such as clothing, beads, weapons, or copper and brass wire (from which ornaments were made). It was presumed that food was only scarce among the less affluent in certain areas and could be procured through trade from the central highlands in an emergency. In a report from the British missionary Harry Leakey from the Kabete mission station near Nairobi, it was stated that:

"The terrors of this were greatly intensified by the fact that about that time an enormous safari with Nubians troops marched right through the Kikuyu country. The agents of the food contractor bought up quantities of grain for what seemed to the unfortunate sellers magnificent returns of brass wire, Amerikani, and beads. But it spelt disaster for them because when at last after two futile plantings if not three, a sufficiency of rain did come to produce crops, there was hardly any grain left in the granaries to put in the soil."

Whether the trade in food was the cause of the food shortage remains a matter of contention. The anthropologist Greet Kershaw observed that areas that did not engage in trade with the large caravans were also affected by famine. The historian Charles Ambler describes the course of the famine as a shifting frontier that moved with the refugees. As soon as the famine migrants moved into an area that was not yet affected by famine, a food shortage developed there. This resulted in the creation of a further cohort of refugees, who subsequently relocated to new regions, thereby causing food scarcity in those areas as well.

The highlands between Mount Kenya and the Nyandarua Mountains, which are known for their high rainfall, were not affected by the famine. In this region, the harvests were also smaller, while some surplus food continued to be produced, which enabled refugees from famine-stricken areas to survive.

In 1898, the construction of the railway reached the Kamba area and the highlands. A substantial quantity of goats and sheep, beans, maize, and grain were procured from the surrounding region to nourish the construction personnel, with some construction sites supporting up to 4,000 individuals. As the construction sites were relocated closer to home, the number of wage labourers, including women, increased significantly. This was because many men had already been employed as labourers on distant construction sites. Furthermore, many men were employed as porters in the expanding caravan trade, resulting in a growing scarcity of labour in agriculture. As a consequence of the persistent drought, those who remained at home were frequently too weak to implement additional measures to alleviate hunger.

At the beginning of 1899, the famine had reached its most severe phase. In addition to the famine, a smallpox epidemic and the appearance of the sand flea, previously unknown in central Kenya, contributed to the region's dire circumstances. The flea spread rapidly, further compounding the crisis. For those who were already exhausted, unfamiliar with sand fleas, the infestation by the insect, which ate through the skin into the flesh, often resulted in crippled limbs or even death.

=== Strategies for survival ===
==== Trade and hunting ====
As crops withered in the fields and supplies dwindled, the most important means of survival was livestock, especially cattle. Their milk and blood provided food without delay or effort. More importantly, because of their value, cattle could be sold as an object of prestige for food from the highlands. In times of need, marriages were annulled in order to reclaim the cattle paid as bride price. In other cases, girls were hastily married off to bring cattle into the household. Despite widespread hunger, however, livestock was rarely slaughtered for its meat content; it was a family's capital and was treated as currency rather than food.

Travelling to the highlands for food was risky, however. The journeys took several days, required food and drink, and involved crossing raging rivers. In many places, gangs of bandits roamed the countryside, attacking travellers and robbing them of their goods. Weakened by hunger, travellers often failed to reach their destination and died along the way.

The most vulnerable families, lacking livestock, were the first to experience hunger and had to contend with daily survival challenges. Many farming families turned to hunting as a source of food, using traps to catch gazelles and lizards in their vicinity. Men formed groups and undertook dangerous hunts for large mammals, such as Cape buffalo or elephants, a practice that was generally frowned upon in central Kenya. Those who were unable to engage in hunting or other forms of food acquisition, including women with children, the elderly, and the infirm, were forced to subsist on roots, grasses, wild fruits, and leaves. In order to survive, they resorted to desperate measures, including boiling leather and calabashes for days to make them edible and transforming charcoal into flour.

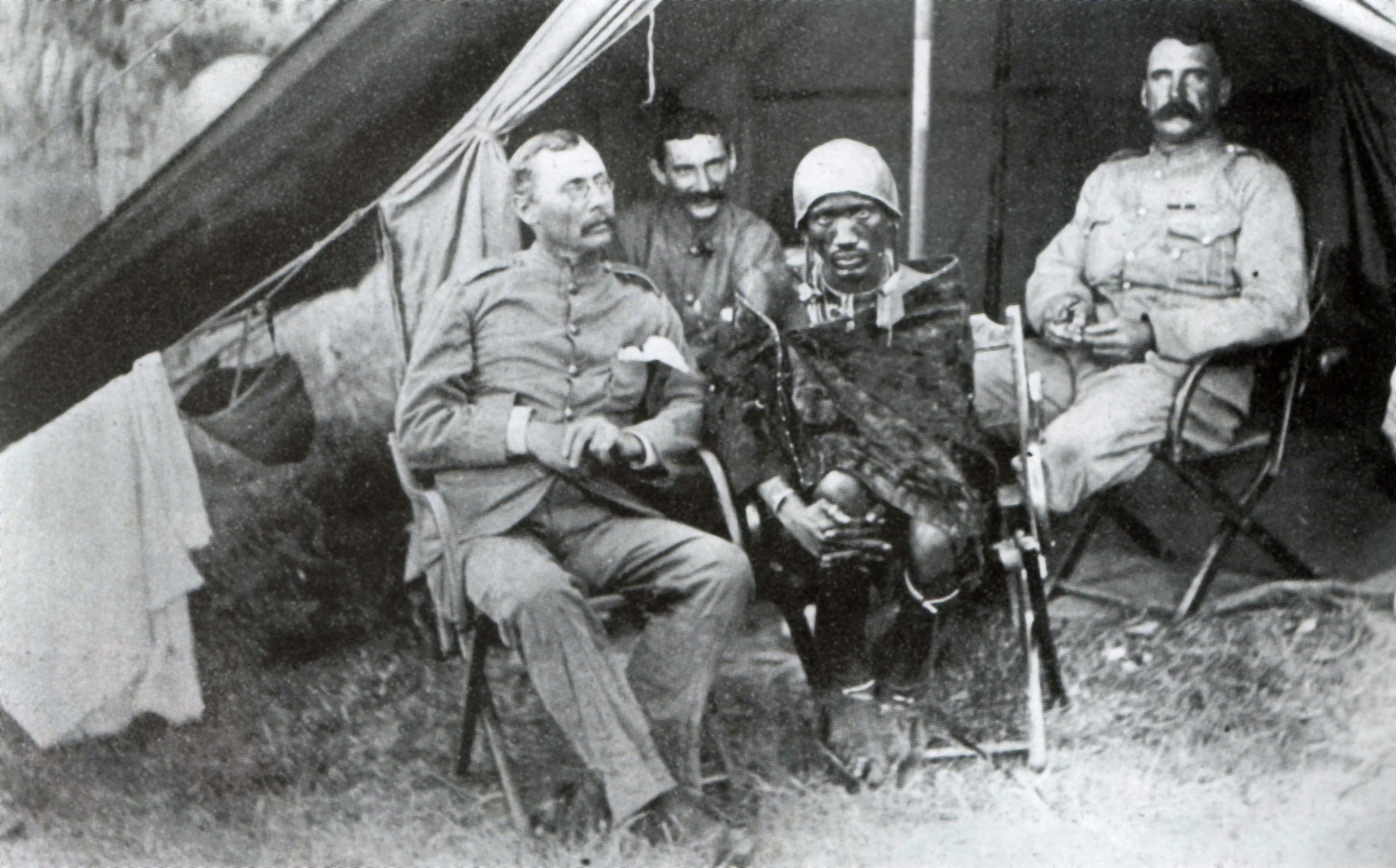
The geographer Halford John Mackinder (left) travelled through the famine region in 1899 with the aim of climbing Mount Kenya. Beside him is Lenana, a Maasai medicine man, after whom Mackinder named one of the mountain's peaks. Between them is Francis Hall, administrative officer at Fort Smith Station.

==== Migration ====
The rainy central highlands, the northern Kikuyu region and the area around Mount Kenya had no shortage of food, which attracted thousands of migrants from neighbouring regions. Many of these migrants died on the way or shortly after their arrival. The survivors attempted to overcome the famine by working as labourers in the fields of the still fertile areas.

A significant survival strategy was the pledging of women and girls as collateral. When families were experiencing food shortages, they would often borrow their female members to other households that had food. This resulted in both the men who received food in return and the women and girls who moved to well-supplied families being saved. This method was pervasive despite the potential for significant psychological distress among the women involved, who frequently had to depart not only from their families but also from their familiar cultural and linguistic milieu. Between 1898 and 1900, thousands of women and girls, mainly from Maasai and Kamba communities, relocated to predominantly Kikuyu-speaking family units residing in the central and fertile highlands. Additionally, numerous women migrated to administrative stations or large railway construction camps independently, securing livelihoods through prostitution, petty trade, and beer brewing.

In addition to the women, entire village and family groups also emigrated from the famine regions. Some areas situated to the east of Mount Kenya and to the south of Nairobi appeared to be depopulated when observed by European travellers who were visiting the country for the first time. The migrants typically sought refuge in regions with which they were familiar from previous trade journeys or where they could anticipate a friendly or familiar reception from marriage or blood brotherhood bonds. Nevertheless, it would be erroneous to assume that the famine refugees were universally welcomed with open arms in their host communities. As a result of their status as refugees, they were subjected to the same marginalisation and exploitation that befalls those who are perceived as outsiders. In particular, women and children were frequently subjected to rape and theft. With the passage of time, there were also instances of massacres, as the host communities were justified in their apprehensions that the influx of refugees would also lead to a depletion of their own food supplies.

==== Crime and violence ====
The hardship resulted in the dissolution of social structures and moral ties in numerous locations. Even the most intimate relationships were severed in order to free oneself from obligations and ensure one's own survival. There were cases of blood brothers robbing each other, as well as instances of men leaving their families and mothers abandoning their children. In a small, abandoned hut in the Kamba region, missionaries discovered the bodies of 24 children, who were found holding each other tightly. Other children were observed to be wandering alone, with siblings or in larger groups, in search of shelter and sustenance. Young men and women formed small gangs and resorted to robbery as a means of survival. They conducted raids on smaller and larger caravans and households that were no longer protected due to the absence of male guardians. Additionally, railway construction sites were subject to frequent raids, as the considerable number of workers present there offered a promising source of food.

The activities of the travelling gangs of marauders served to render life in the scattered settlements increasingly dangerous. The frequency of attacks on refugees increased, with women and children in particular being captured by traders and sold to caravans as slaves. Even within the familial structure, individuals occupying a superior position within the social hierarchy were responsible for the sale of family members into slavery. Furthermore, rumours of cannibalism also began to circulate. In a report, ivory trader John Boyes stated: "Some of my men heard gruesome tales of men killing and eating each other in their desperation at the lack of food."

=== Smallpox epidemic ===
The situation was further exacerbated by the emergence of a smallpox epidemic that spread from Mombasa along the railway line. In Mombasa, the corpses were collected from the streets on a daily basis, yet the local colonial administration did not implement any measures to contain the spread of the disease. It rapidly spread to the famine-stricken central region via the recently constructed Uganda Railway line.

Smallpox affected both the starving and the well-fed. It was particularly devastating in the fertile highlands, where communities had largely escaped hunger. The disease, brought in by the many refugees from the famine, spread rapidly in the densely populated area - whose population had increased due to the influx of refugees. Whole villages were soon depopulated.

Rachel Watt, the wife of a missionary, described the situation in Machakos, about 100 kilometres east of Nairobi: "No matter where one went corpses strewed the tracks. Little skeleton babies were found crying by the dead bodies of their mothers."

Many people tried to protect themselves from illness and death with amulets, medicines and other spells. Others turned their anger and despair against individuals, especially abandoned women or widows, who were accused of witchcraft and blamed for their misery. Some societies, such as the Embu, banned foreigners from their territory altogether to prevent the spread of smallpox. In other areas, the refugees who did move in were forced to care for the sick.

=== Role of the Colonial Administration ===
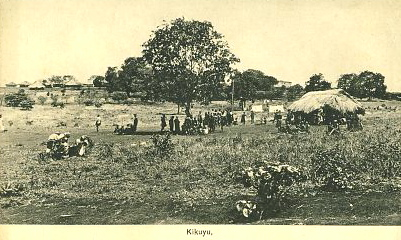
Fort Smith station around 1900

The colonial administration and mission stations took advantage of the situation to increase their influence. With access to imported goods, they were no longer dependent on local food production, especially after the railway reached Nairobi. The stations became focal points for many hungry people from the surrounding area because of the availability of food, especially rice imported from India. After the railway was completed, the stations and mission centres grew rapidly. The Europeans living here had often complained about the lack of labour to maintain the station. Migrant workers preferred to work on the railway as they were better fed and paid. The problem of labour shortages was solved when hundreds of men, mostly Maasai, moved to the area around the stations to work as porters and auxiliary policemen. They were paid in rice. In the regions around these early stations, the famine is therefore remembered as Yua ya Mapunga, the "rice famine", because it introduced this relatively expensive and previously unknown staple food.

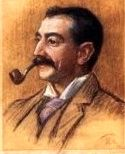
Francis Hall. As administrator of the Fort Smith station, he was one of the few European witnesses to the dramatic famine

At the same time, an aid programme was initiated by the administration and the missions, with funding from the British government. Camps were established in the Kamba area and around Nairobi, providing one pound of rice per day to adults. Refugees were drawn to these locations. In Machakos, the British official John Ainsworth distributed 500 portions per day in August 1899, with this number climbing to more than 1,500 at the end of the year. In total, approximately 5,000 individuals in central Kenya were reliant on food donations from officials and missionaries at this time.

=== End of hunger ===
The final months of 1899 were marked by heavy rainfall, which brought an end to the drought that had devastated central Kenya for the previous two years. However, this rainfall did not result in an immediate resolution to the famine. In some areas, this period of rainfall and subsequent flooding led to further hardship. The fields were devastated, and overgrown with weeds, and not all survivors had the strength to prepare the soil for sowing again. In areas where crops were ripening, the temptation to consume unripe crops led to further deterioration in the health of those who were already weakened by hunger.

Although the necessity was not immediately alleviated by precipitation, the supply situation improved at a relatively rapid pace. European stations provided seeds, as many of those affected had previously consumed or sold their own seeds in response to the emergency. A few weeks later, the survivors were able to harvest their first crops.

== Consequences ==
=== Victims ===
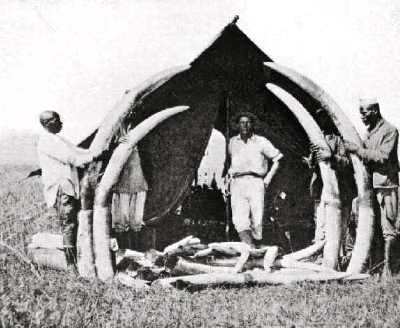
John Boyes, ivory trader and adventurer, witnessed the famine in the highlands and Kikuyu region

All attempts to ascertain the number of victims are based on highly imprecise estimates. This is due to the fact that the population of central Kenya prior to the establishment of colonial rule can only be estimated with a low degree of certainty. The only comprehensive study of the famine's impact was conducted in the 1950s by Dutch anthropologist Gretha Kershaw, who limited her research to a small area around Nairobi. The study revealed that 24 out of 71 adult males did not survive the famine. Nevertheless, it is necessary to consider that this region was among the more affluent ones and that the arrival of Europeans created a number of opportunities for survival.

Rather, it is the descriptions of personal impressions by European observers that give an idea of the scale of the casualties. In October, Francis Hall, a British official at the Fort Smith administrative station in the southern Kikuyu region, wrote to his father: "What with famine & smallpox we are burying 6 or 8 a day. One can't go for a walk without failing over corpses." John Boyes, who had gained some influence in the Kikuyu area, wrote in a report that of a caravan of famine refugees he accompanied to the highlands, about fifty people were dying every day.

It is evident that the mortality rate exhibited considerable variation across the various regions. The areas situated to the east and south of the highlands, which were predominantly inhabited by the Kamba, Maasai and, to a lesser extent, Kikuyu, bore the burden of the highest losses. These areas, which correspond to the former Central Province, encompass Nairobi, the south-western part of the Eastern Province, as well as the south-eastern part of the Rift Valley Province. The decline in population observed by Europeans, particularly in the lower-lying areas, may indicate both a high death rate and the emigration of people. A common topos in descriptions of stays in central Kenya from this period is the presence of paths lined with corpses. One British settler recalled the railway line with the words: "In 1899, when I went up the line, I could not get as far as Limuru. The railway line was a mass of corpses."

=== Social and economic reorganisation ===
In the aftermath of the disaster, the primary objective for the population was to rebuild households, families and communities, restore social order and stimulate local economic activity. With trade now conducted via the railway, one of the main sources of income was lost. Consequently, people organised themselves into smaller, more dispersed households rather than larger communities grouped around a patriarch. This approach enabled them to feed all members of a family with the land that was available.

The reconstruction process was conducted in the midst of a mass grave. One woman, who was a child at the time, later reflected on her experience:

"After the famine, a season came when people planted millet and it came up very well. But you could not walk in the fields because of the corpses of those who had died. You would see a pumpkin or a gourd but you couldn't get to them because they were on top of the bodies of people."

Following their experiences, many individuals opted to relocate from the semi-arid and low-lying steppes. Instead, they settled in the forested highlands, which offered reliable rainfall and a secure livelihood after the arduous labour of clearing, but limited grazing land for livestock farming. Due to the significant increase in uncultivated land, the dry regions became scrubland once more, and thus, in the long term, a habitat for the tsetse fly. This presented a significant challenge to the reintroduction of cattle breeders and the restoration of local livestock farming in these regions.

Social contrasts reached a point of permanent intensification. Those families who had survived the hardship without leaving their homes often occupied the land of their neighbours who had migrated to the highlands. Due to their advantageous circumstances, they were able to incorporate distressed individuals, widows, and orphans into their household, utilize their labour to cultivate additional land, and thus rapidly amass considerable wealth. A considerable number of refugees who returned to their homeland discovered that their former land had been occupied by others. Consequently, they were compelled to seek alternative sources of income, either as tenants or by engaging in wage labour. However, the loss of their land precluded them from replicating the success they had enjoyed as farmers prior to the famine. Even as late as the 1930s, disputes over land that had their origins in this period were brought before the courts.

=== Consolidation of colonial rule ===
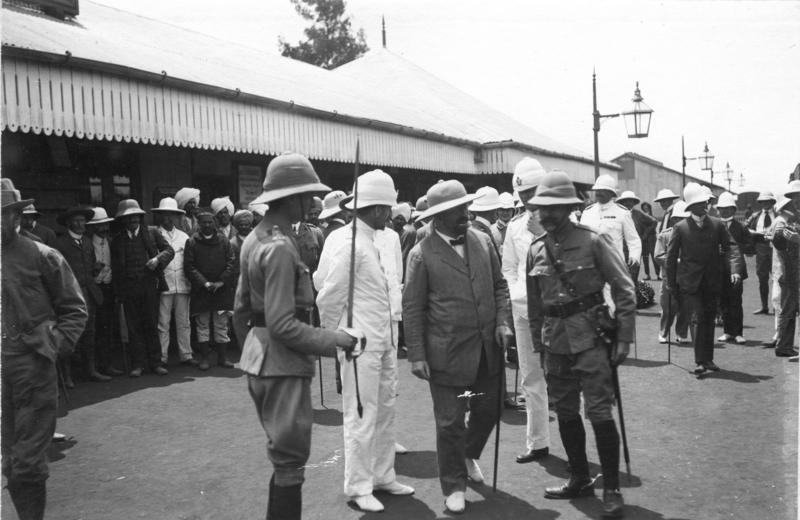
The railway station in Nairobi in 1907: colonial rule is well established

The British colonial power emerged from the famine with greater strength. As a consequence of the famine, the administrative stations had acquired a considerable workforce and a sizeable following among the African population, the majority of whom continued to reside in the vicinity of the stations even after the situation had improved. Moreover, the reputation of the missions had also improved considerably. Prior to the famine, there had been a notable lack of interest in Christianity, which proved disappointing for the missions. During the famine, however, a significant number of individuals in need of refuge sought assistance from these institutions, which resulted in the emergence of the first generation of African Christians in central Kenya. In the vicinity of Nairobi, missionary Krieger had on a regular basis provided the local inhabitants with meat from wild animals that he had hunted. In retrospect, missionary Bangert from the Kangundo mission station perceived the famine as a "marvelous opportunity for ... getting the gospel into the hearts of these people."

The dispersed households exhibited a diminishing sense of belonging to the erstwhile small communities. Instead, they increasingly categorised themselves in accordance with the tribal categories that had been introduced by the colonial administration and which formed the basis of the administrative division of the protectorate. The colonial administration appointed paramount chiefs, who represented an entire ethnic group, in order to facilitate control of the population.

In 1902, significant portions of the southern Kikuyu region and the Maasai settlement area were expropriated and made available for sale to white settlers. The majority of this land had been depopulated by death and migration during the famine. As the population of central Kenya recovered from the losses incurred during the famine, the scarcity of land became a persistent issue that continued to worsen until the end of the colonial era.

=== Ethnicisation of relations in central Kenya ===
The famine had a profound impact on the social dynamics between the communities in central Kenya. The Kikuyu population exhibited an increasingly hostile attitude towards the Maasai. As a result of their residence in drier regions and the impact of the famine, the Maasai engaged in extensive livestock, women, and food raiding in the Kikuyu, Embu, and Mbeere areas of the highlands. This included the murder of women and children. As a significant number of Maasai were employed as auxiliary troops for European administrative stations, they were also involved in punitive expeditions against groups in the highlands, during which large quantities of livestock and food were confiscated by the Europeans.

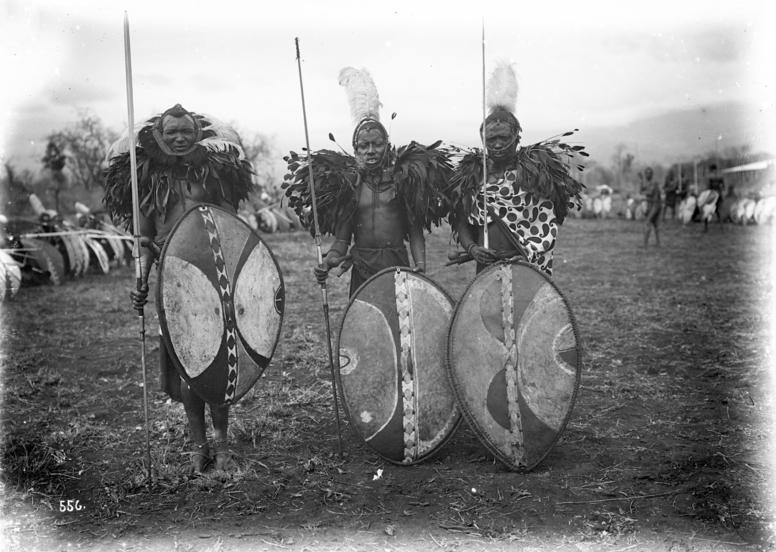
Maasai warriors around 1900 in Kenya, a popular photo motif for visitors arriving in the country by railway

The high-altitude regions of Kenya, inhabited by Kikuyu, Embu speakers and Mbeere, had not been directly affected by the famine. However, they did suffer from its indirect effects. The influx of refugees was perceived as a potential threat, given the concurrent scarcity of food and the rapid spread of smallpox, which was seen as a consequence of the migration. In Embu, the villages attempted to protect themselves against the distressed immigrants. The influx was prohibited, and the disease was increasingly perceived as an ethnic trait of the incoming Maasai and Kamba.

The practice of pawning women, which had occurred on a significant scale, also gave rise to tensions following the general improvement in the supply situation. Families who had pawned women were interested in reintegrating them into their households with a view to rebuilding communities, utilising their labour and reproductive potential. This often proved to be a significant challenge, as the women were often returned with some hesitation. In many instances, the women had already been married, while in other cases, they had been sold as slaves. This led to the perception among the Kamba and Maasai that the highland societies, particularly the Kikuyu, were engaged in the theft of women for economic gain, causing significant hardship to their neighbours.

== The famine in collective memory ==
Although Europeans were horrified by the extent of the famine, they saw it as one of the many disasters that Africans had to suffer until the establishment of colonial rule. The full importance of the famine for the African population was only fully appreciated in scientific studies conducted from around 1950 onwards. The anthropologist Gretha Kershaw, the Kenyan historian Godfrey Muriuki and the American historian Charles Ambler, who conducted extensive interviews and field research in Kenya for their investigations, revealed through their research the trauma that the famine had triggered in the Kenyan population.

In Central Kenya, it was commonly believed that both prosperity and evil were sent by the ancestors as a form of punishment or support. The famine was also perceived as a form of retribution for an act of wrongdoing. The establishment of colonial rule, the construction of the railway and the resulting increase in the presence of whites in Central Kenya, which coincided with the famine, was therefore not initially perceived as a political event. Rather than being viewed as a discrete event, the rinderpest, the lack of rain and smallpox were seen as part of a universal crisis and reckoning, the causes of which were attributed to the actions of the affected population. Even decades after the famine, survivors were reluctant and hesitant to discuss their experiences during this period. They recalled with trepidation not only their own affliction but also the dissolution of the social order and the authority of the ancestors over the living.

The famine remains a significant historical event in Kenya, with its impact still vivid in the collective memory of the country's population. In the Kikuyu language, it is referred to as Ng'aragu ya Ruraya, which translates as "The Great Hunger." In the Kamba-speaking areas, it is known as Yua ya Ngomanisye, which translates as "The Hunger That Went Everywhere" or "The Boundless Hunger."

== Relevant sources ==
- Ambler, Charles H. (1988). Kenyan communities in the age of imperialism: the central region in the late nineteenth century. Yale historical publications. New Haven: Yale University Press. ISBN 978-0-300-03957-3.
- Boyes, John (1911). King of the Wa-Kikuyu: A true Story of Travel and Adventure in Africa. London: Methuen.
- Kenya Land Commission Report. Vol. 1, 2 & 3. Nairobi: Kenya Land Commission. 1934.
- Kershaw, Greet (1997). Mau Mau from Below. Athens: Ohio University Press.
- Muriuki, Godfrey (1974). A History of the Kikuyu 1500–1900. Nairobi: Oxford University Press.
- Ogot, Bethwell A. (ed.). Ecology and History in East Africa. Nairobi: Kenya Literature Bureau.
- Sullivan, Paul, ed. (2006). Kikuyu District: Francis Hall's letters from East Africa to his Father, Lt. Colonel Edward Hall 1892–1901. Dar es Salaam: Mkuki na Nyota Publishers.
- Watt, Rachel S. (1912). In the Heart of Savagedom. London: Marshall brothers.
