= White Highlands =

Area of Kenya, once reserved for whites

- Region
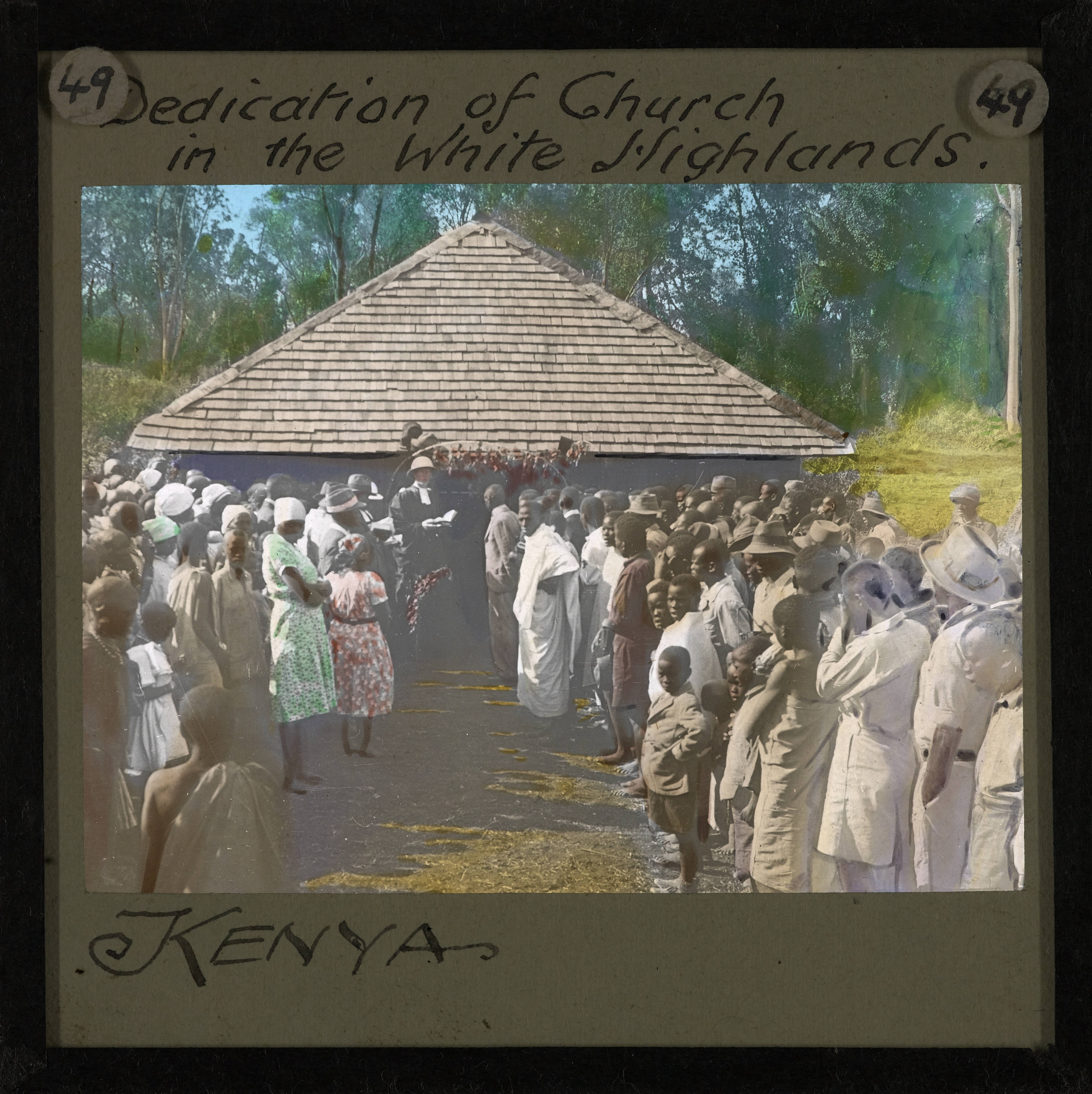
- Photograph of the dedication of a White Highlands church
- Etymology: Area where white colonists lived.
- Country: Kenya
- Time zone: UTC+3:00 (EAT)

The White Highlands is an area in the central uplands of Kenya. It was traditionally the homeland of indigenous Central Kenyan communities up to the colonial period, when it became the centre of European settlement in colonial Kenya; between 1902 and 1961, it was officially reserved for the exclusive use of Europeans by the colonial government.

== Name ==
The first European explorers and administrators used the term Highlands to refer to the region no less than 1,500 metres (5,000 ft) above sea level, which they believed was best suited climatically for Europeans to reside in. During the process of settlement, the term came to be used for the areas already settled by local African tribes. As The Crown Lands Ordinance of 1902 permitted land grants only to Europeans, the Highlands came to mean only the lands Europeans could own and manage.

== History ==
=== Exploration ===
To early explorers and administrators, the cool climate and absence of population over large swathes of the Highlands of Kenya made it a uniquely attractive area for European settlement in sub-tropical Africa. In 1893, the explorer Frederick Lugard, whilst lobbying for a railway in East Africa, noted that European settlement in the region was not feasible until the cooler Highlands were made accessible. This view was echoed by Sir Harry Johnston who, on completion of the Uganda Railway, noted of the Highlands:

"Here we have a territory admirably suited for a white man's country, and I can say this, with no thought of injustice to any native race, for the country in question is either utterly uninhabited for miles and miles or at most its inhabitants are wandering hunters who have no settled home, or whose fixed habitation is the lands outside the healthy area."

=== Settlement ===
In 1902, Sir Charles Eliot, the British Commissioner of the Protectorate, encouraged settlement of the Highlands for farming. Eliot, a leading critic of building the railway, believed that the only way to recoup the money spent on its construction was by opening up the Highlands for farming. In his view, only European settlers and agriculture could develop the region and generate the necessary funds to support the colonial administration. Eliot's view was supported by pioneer settlers such as the 3rd Baron Delamere and Ewart Grogan, who believed that they had a civilising mission to transform the entire country into a modern industrialised "White Man's Country".

By 1903 there were about 100 European settlers in the Highlands. A large proportion of the settlers hailed from South Africa including 280 Boers from the Transvaal who settled in the Uasin Gishu plateau in 1908.

By 1914, there were around a thousand European settlers in the Highlands. In 1914, around twenty percent of the leases held in the region were held by 13 individuals or groups. The granting of leases to settlers for low prices resulted in rampant land speculation to the extent that by 1930 approximately sixty-five percent of land reserved for Europeans was not under any form of agriculturally productive activity.

=== Treaties ===
When European settlement began, the Highlands were primarily inhabited by nomadic pastoralists, and the absence of settled agrarian communities allowed British officials to describe the region as uninhabited. At the time, the African population was distributed between cultivating tribes and pastoralist people. The cultivating tribes lived mainly in the high rainfall areas of Nyanza, and in the fertile areas of the slopes of Mount Kenya, the Aberdares, the Elgeyo Escarpment, and the hills of Ukambani.

The intervening areas consisted of extensive but sparsely-inhabited plains, at over 1,500 m (5,000 ft) feet, where rainfall was more uncertain and pastoralists relied on the grazing of animals. European settlement was predominately in those extensive plains, traditionally inhabited by the Maasai tribe.

During the turn of the century, the Maasai were devastated by several natural disasters which culminated in the 1899 famine in central Kenya. Accompanying a smallpox epidemic was a severe drought, an invasion of locusts that destroyed vegetation in large areas of land, and an outbreak of rinderpest that killed large numbers of cattle. The loss of cattle resulted in starvation among the Maasai and other pastoral societies.

The Maasai entered into treaties with British officials to surrender large amounts of land, and their reduced manpower meant they were unable to defend against rival tribes. Of the 31,000 km^{2} (12,000 sq mi) of European settled land, 18,000 km^{2} (7,000 sq mi) consisted of former Maasai grazing grounds abandoned under agreements between 1904 and 1913; large parts of remaining areas, such as the Uasin Gishu plateau, were uninhabited.

British officials also purchased land from other tribes, which the Maasai had pushed to woodlands on the fringes of the Highlands. These tribes practised shifting cultivation, resulting in large areas of land lying fallow for a number of years. Similar disasters afflicting the Maasai also caused havoc in those tribes, and between 1901 and 1902, a famine resulted in the Kikuyu losing between twenty and fifty percent of their population on their frontier with the Maasai.

Many survivors sought refuge with relatives elsewhere in their area, but leaving their land made the frontier appear uncultivated to European officials. Before the famine, the Kikuyu had been buying up parcels of land on the frontier for individual holdings.

As had happened in colonies in North America, when British officials later began paying the Kikuyu for that land, the British understood themselves to be acquiring the land freehold under colonial law. The Kikuyu, however, understood that they were only renting the land, and that the Kikuyu could reclaim use of it in the future, because a "freehold" transaction did not conform to local legal custom. The mutual misunderstanding was a contributing factor to the Mau Mau rebellion.

=== End of reservation ===
The reservation of the White Highlands for Europeans by administrative practice was ended by the Land Control Regulations in 1961.

== Extent ==
Initially the region was not clearly defined, instead lying between two points on the railway track, namely Kiu and Fort Ternan, and later from Sultan Hamud to Kibigori. It was not until 1939 that the boundaries were defined in the 7th Schedule to The Crown Lands Ordinance under authority of the Kenya (Highlands) Order in Council, 1939. The Order also established a Highlands Board with a majority elected by the Legislative Council to advise and make recommendations on the disposal of land in the region.

== Today ==
Today, the region is at the heart of Kenya's economy. It is the country's best served region by road and rail and has many flourishing cities such as Nairobi, Nakuru, Eldoret, Kitale, Thika, Kericho and Nyeri. Although covering only five percent of Kenya's total land area, it produces most of Kenya's agricultural exports, particularly tea, coffee, sisal and pyrethrum.

== See also ==
- 1899 famine in central Kenya
- East Africa Protectorate
- Happy Valley set
- Kenya Colony
- White people in Kenya
- Hugh Cholmondeley, 3rd Baron Delamere
