= Edward Northey (British Army officer) =

British Army general and colonial administrator

Major-General Sir Edward Northey GCMG CB

Governor of Kenya
- In office 1919–1922
- Monarch: George V
- Preceded by: Charles Calvert Bowring
- Succeeded by: Robert Coryndon

High Commissioner of Zanzibar
- In office 1922–1924

Personal details
- Born: 28 May 1868 Cockerham, Lancashire, England
- Died: 25 December 1953 (aged 85) England
- Awards: Knight Grand Cross of the Order of St Michael and St George; Companion of the Order of the Bath

Military service
- Allegiance: United Kingdom
- Branch/service: British Army
- Years of service: 1888–1926
- Rank: Major-General
- Unit: King's Royal Rifle Corps
- Commands: Nyasa-Rhodesia Field Force; 43rd (Wessex) Infantry Division
- Battles/wars: Second Boer War; First World War; Western Front; East African campaign

Major-General Sir Edward Northey GCMG CB (28 May 1868 – 25 December 1953) was a senior British Army officer of the First World War who commanded a brigade on the Western Front until wounded in 1915. Returning to service in 1916, Northey took command of a colonial force in Nyasaland in the East African campaign, later becoming Governor of Kenya. He later served as a general of Territorial forces and retired in 1926.

== Birth and early career ==
Edward Northey was born in 1868 at Cockerham, Lancashire, and educated at Eton College and the Royal Military College, Sandhurst, being commissioned into the King's Royal Rifle Corps (KRRC) as a second lieutenant on 7 March 1888. He was promoted to lieutenant on 7 May 1890, and served in expeditions to Hazara and the Miranzai Valley in 1891 and one to Isazai the following year. Promotion to captain followed on 1 July 1895. From late 1899, Northey took part in the Second Boer War, remaining in South Africa until 1902.

On his return, he was appointed adjutant of a volunteer battalion, the 1st Middlesex Rifles (Victoria and St. George′s).

On 18 December 1911 he was promoted to lieutenant colonel and appointed as Colonel Reginald Oxley's successor as commanding officer (CO) of the 1st Battalion, KRRC.

== First World War ==
When the First World War broke out in 1914, Northey was a lieutenant colonel in the King's Royal Rifle Corps and served with the regiment, commanding the regiment's 1st Battalion, on the Western Front during the first year of the war. After being made a brevet colonel in February 1915, Northey was promoted to temporary brigadier general the next month and took over the 15th Infantry Brigade, part of the 5th Division, but was seriously wounded during the Second Battle of Ypres the next month. The date is unclear, but Northey was reportedly surveying the site of a new communication trench when he was struck in the thigh by shrapnel.

Returning to the army in 1916 after recovering from his wound, Northey was posted to Nyasaland in command of the Nyasa-Rhodesia Field Force, operating against Lettow-Vorbeck's indigenous and German forces in the East African campaign.

Northey was appointed Companion of the Order of the Bath in 1917. and Knight Commander of the Order of St Michael and St George in 1918 for his war service. In January 1918 he was promoted to the substantive rank of major general.

== Governor of the British East Africa Protectorate ==
At the war's end Northey was appointed Governor of the British East Africa Protectorate, which became known as Kenya in 1920.

On 16 October 1919 The Times newspaper reported that Sir Edward Northey had met with an accident, while playing polo, which required the removal of his right eye. The accident occurred in British East Africa.

In 1919, Northey issued a circular which instructed government officials to coerce African labour to work on European-owned farms and estates, despite earlier Colonial Office objections to this plan. The scandal generated by the Northey proposal caused the Colonial Office to make clear in 1921 that compulsory paid labour by local Africans could only be used on government projects, not to direct labour to European estates, and then only if absolutely necessary and with Colonial Office approval.

In 1922, Northey was transferred to the lesser post of High Commissioner of Zanzibar, and was elevated to Knight Grand Cross of the Order of St Michael and St George the same year. He returned to Britain in 1924 to return to military service.

== Late career ==
On his return, Northey was placed in command of the 43rd (Wessex) Infantry Division, a Territorial Army (TA) formation, on 3 September 1924, taking over from Major General Louis Bols. This responsibility was shared with command of the South West Area of Britain, and Northey performed both duties until his retirement from military service in October 1926.

== Personal ==
Northey married Anna Evangeline Cloete (1872 – 3 January 1941) on 30 April 1897 at Wynberg, South Africa. They had five children, three of whom survived him.

Northey died on 25 December 1953 after a peaceful retirement.

== Bibliography ==
- Davies, Frank (1997). Bloody Red Tabs: General Officer Casualties of the Great War 1914–1918. London: Pen and Sword Books. ISBN 978-0-85052-463-5.

Military offices
Preceded by Sir Louis Bols	GOC 43rd (Wessex) Infantry Division; 1924–1926	Succeeded by Sir George Jeffreys
