= Armigel Wade =

British colonial administrator

Sir Armigel de Vins Wade CMG OBE
- Born: 17 October 1880; Henfield, Sussex, England
- Died: 4 December 1966 (aged 86); Worthing, Sussex, England
- Occupations: Teacher and colonial administrator

Sir Armigel de Vins Wade CMG OBE (17 October 1880 – 4 December 1966) was a British colonial administrator.

== Life ==
Wade was born at Henfield, Sussex on 17 October 1880 the son of Charles Wade, a solicitor, and his wife Sarah. Wade was educated at Lancing College before studying at Keble College, Oxford. After graduation, he taught classics at Worksop College, Nottinghamshire and at the Forest School, before being appointed Assistant District Commissioner in the East Africa Protectorate in 1912. He was made an Officer of the Order of the British Empire (OBE) in 1931. In the following year, he became Chief Native Commissioner in Kenya Colony. He was Chief Secretary to the Government of Kenya between 1934 and 1939; he was made a Companion of the Order of St Michael and St George (CMG) in 1935 and knighted in 1937. He had two spells as Acting Governor and Commander-in-Chief of Kenya, between March and August 1935, and between December 1936 and April 1937. He retired in 1939. He returned to Britain and spent some of his later years in Pulborough, Sussex, and died on 4 December 1966.
