= East Africa Protectorate =

British protectorate in Africa from 1895 to 1920

- 1895–1920
- Flag Badge
- Anthem: God Save the Queen (1895–1901); God Save the King (1901–1920)
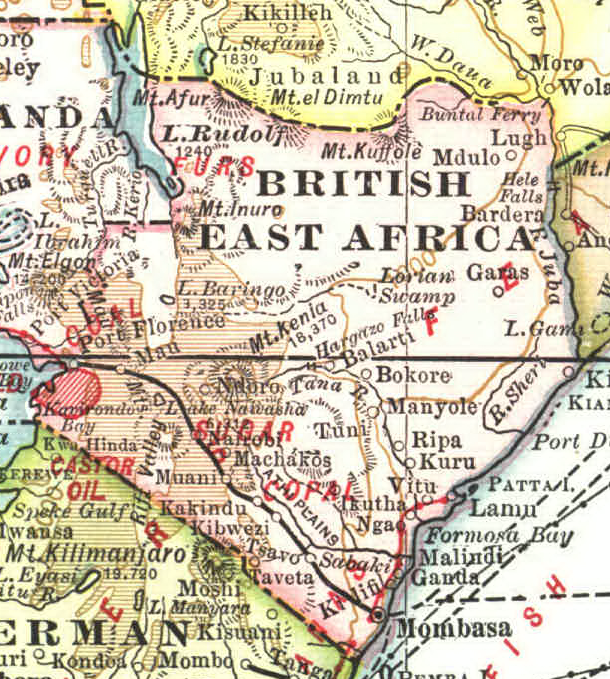
- Map of British East Africa in 1909
- Status: British protectorate
- Capital: Mombasa (1895–1905); Nairobi (1905–1920)
- Common languages: English (official); Swahili, Kikuyu, Kamba, Luo, Kisii, Kimeru, Nandi–Markweta, Somali (also spoken)
- Religion: Christianity, Hinduism, Islam, traditional African religion
- Monarch
  - 1895–1901: Victoria
  - 1901–1910: Edward VII
  - 1910–1920: George V
- Commissioner / Governor
  - 1895–1897: Arthur Henry Hardinge
  - 1919–1920: Sir Edward Northey
- History
  - Established: 1 July 1895
  - Disestablished: 23 July 1920

Area
- 1904: 696,400 km^{2} (268,900 sq mi)

Population
  - 1904: 4,000,000
- Currency: Indian rupee (1895–1906); East African rupee (1906–20)
Preceded by	Succeeded by
Imperial British East Africa Company; German; Witu Protectorate	Kenya Colony
- Today part of: Kenya and Somalia

East Africa Protectorate (also known as British East Africa) was a British protectorate in the African Great Lakes, occupying roughly the same area as present-day Kenya, from the Indian Ocean inland to the border with Uganda in the west part. Controlled by the United Kingdom in the late 19th century, it grew out of British commercial interests in the area in the 1880s and remained a protectorate until 1920 when it became the Colony of Kenya, save for an independent 16-kilometre-wide (10 mi) coastal strip that became the Kenya Protectorate.

== Administration ==
European Christian missionaries began settling in the area from Mombasa to Mount Kilimanjaro in the 1840s, nominally under the protection of the Sultanate of Zanzibar. In 1886, the British government encouraged William Mackinnon, who already had an agreement with the Sultan and whose shipping company traded extensively in the African Great Lakes, to establish British influence in the region. He formed a British East Africa Association which led to the Imperial British East Africa Company being chartered in 1888 and given the original grant to administer the dependency. It administered about 240 kilometres (150 mi) of coastline stretching from the Jubba River via Mombasa to German East Africa which were leased from the Sultan. The British "sphere of influence", agreed at the Berlin Conference of 1885, extended up the coast and inland across the future Kenya. Mombasa was the administrative centre at this time.

However, the company began to fail, and on 1 July 1895, the British government proclaimed a protectorate, the administration being transferred to the Foreign Office. In 1902, administration was again transferred to the Colonial Office. In 1897 Hugh Cholmondeley, the pioneer of white settlement, arrived in the Kenya highlands, which was then part of the Protectorate. Lord Delamere was impressed by the agricultural possibilities of the area. In 1902, the boundaries of the protectorate were extended to include what was previously the Eastern Province of Uganda. Also, in 1902, the East Africa Syndicate received a grant of 1,300 square kilometres (500 sq mi) to promote white settlement in the Highlands. Lord Delamere now commenced extensive farming operations, and in 1905, when a large number of new settlers arrived from England and South Africa, the Protectorate was transferred from the authority of the Foreign Office to that of the Colonial Office. The capital was shifted from Mombasa to Nairobi in 1905. A regular government and legislature were constituted by Order in Council in 1906. This constituted the administrator, known as a governor, and provided for legislative and executive councils. Lieutenant Colonel J. Hayes Sadler was the first governor and commander in chief. There were occasional troubles with local tribes, but the country was opened up by the government and the colonists with little bloodshed. After the First World War, more farmers arrived from England and South Africa, and by 1919 the European population was estimated at 9,000 settlers.

On 23 July 1920, the inland areas of the protectorate were annexed as British dominions by Order in Council. That part of the former protectorate was thereby constituted as the Colony of Kenya. The remaining 16-kilometre-wide (10 mi) coastal strip (with the exception of Witu), remained a protectorate under an agreement with the Sultan of Zanzibar. That coastal strip, remaining under the sovereignty of the Sultan of Zanzibar, was constituted as the Protectorate of Kenya in 1920. The East Africa Protectorate was bounded to the north by the Ethiopian Empire and the Huwan, a semi-independent vassal state of the Ethiopian Empire; to the east by the Italian Geledi, to the south by German East Africa; to the west by the Uganda Protectorate.

== Development ==
In April 1902, the first application for land in British East Africa was made by the East Africa Syndicate – a company in which financiers belonging to the British South Africa Company were interested – which sought a grant of 1,300 square kilometres (500 sq mi), and this was followed by other applications for considerable areas, many of which came from prospective settlers in South Africa. In 1903, Joseph Chamberlain, then serving as Secretary of State for the Colonies, offered 13,000 square kilometres (5,000 sq mi) at Uasin Gishu in British East Africa to Zionist settlers as part of the Uganda Scheme. However, opposition to the scheme at the Sixth Zionist Congress led to the plan falling through and Chamberlain swiftly withdrew the offer. In April 1903, Major Frederick Russell Burnham, an American scout then serving as a director of the East African Syndicate, sent an expedition consisting of John Weston Brooke, John Charles Blick, Mr. Bittlebank and Mr. Brown, to assess the mineral wealth of the region. The party, known as the "Four B.'s", travelled from Nairobi via Mount Elgon northwards to the western shores of Lake Rudolf, experiencing plenty of privations from want of water, and of the danger from encounters with the Maasai. With the arrival in 1903 of hundreds of prospective settlers, chiefly from South Africa, questions were raised concerning the preservation for the Maasai of their rights of pasturage, and the decision was made to entertain no more applications for large areas of land.

In the process of carrying out this policy of colonisation a dispute arose between Sir Charles Eliot, Commissioner of British East Africa, and Lord Lansdowne, the British Foreign Secretary. The East Africa Syndicate had applied for and been pledged the lease of 1,300 square kilometres (500 sq mi) of land. Lansdowne, believing himself bound by the pledges, decided the applications should be approved. In a separate matter, two South African applicants who were each attempting to lease 130 square kilometres (50 sq mi) were declined by Lansdowne, and he refused Eliot permission to conclude the transactions. In view of this Eliot resigned his post, giving his reason in a public telegram to the Prime Minister, dated Mombasa, 21 June 1904, stating: "Lord Lansdowne ordered me to refuse grants of land to certain private persons while giving a monopoly of land on unduly advantageous terms to the East Africa Syndicate. I have refused to execute these instructions, which I consider unjust and impolitic." Sir Donald William Stewart, the chief commissioner of Ashanti (Ghana), was announced as Sir Charles' successor on the day the telegram was sent.

== Legislation ==
In 1914, the British government banned cannabis ("bhang") in the Protectorate.

== Stamps and postal history of British East Africa ==
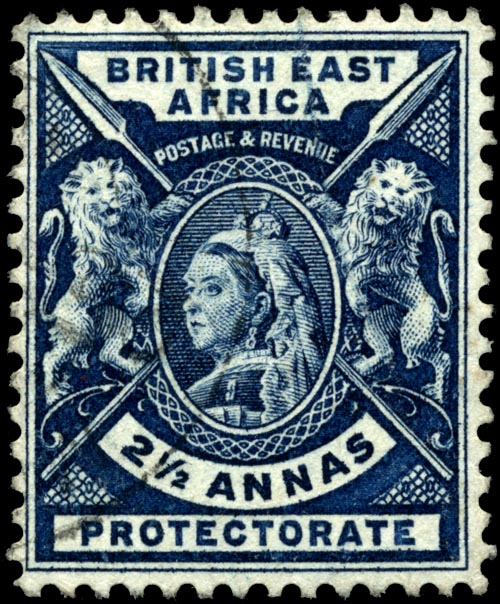
2½ annas, 1896

The protectorate upon becoming a direct possession of British Empire in 1895 had overprinted postal stamps from India and the former Imperial British East Africa Company issued. Along with this the territory was incorporated into the Universal Postal Union. By 1896, the first line of official stamps was issued, although the protectorate's postage service was short lived as in 1901 it was merged with the Protectorate of Uganda's mail service becoming the East Africa and Uganda protectorates issuing their first stamps in 1904.

== See also ==
- 1899 famine in central Kenya
- Charles Eliot
- List of colonial governors and administrators of Kenya
- East African campaign (World War I)
- History of Kenya
- Analysis of Western European colonialism and colonization
