= North Kivu =

Province of the Democratic Republic of the Congo

North Kivu Province du Nord-Kivu (French) Jimbo la Kivu Kaskazini (Swahili)
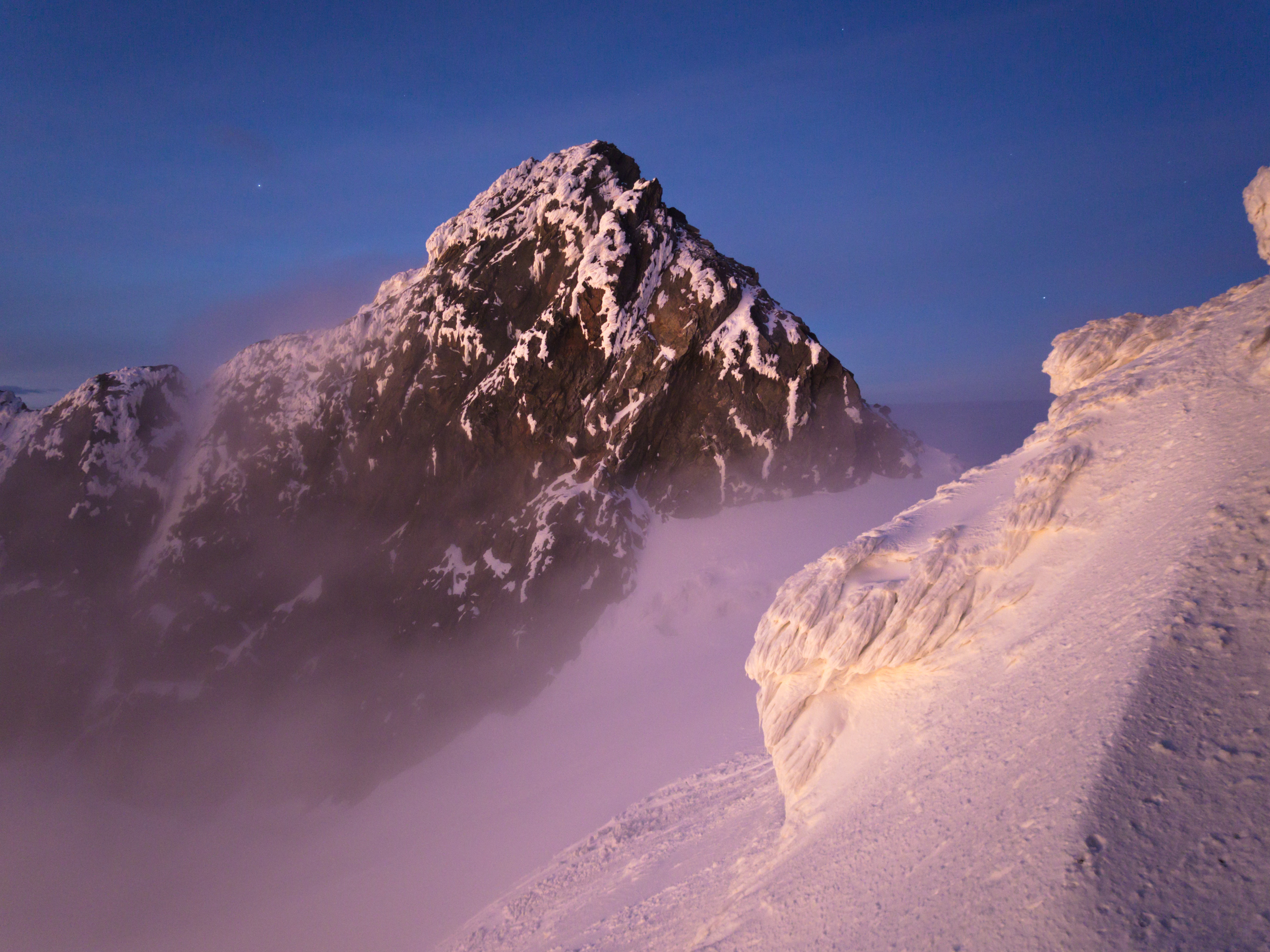
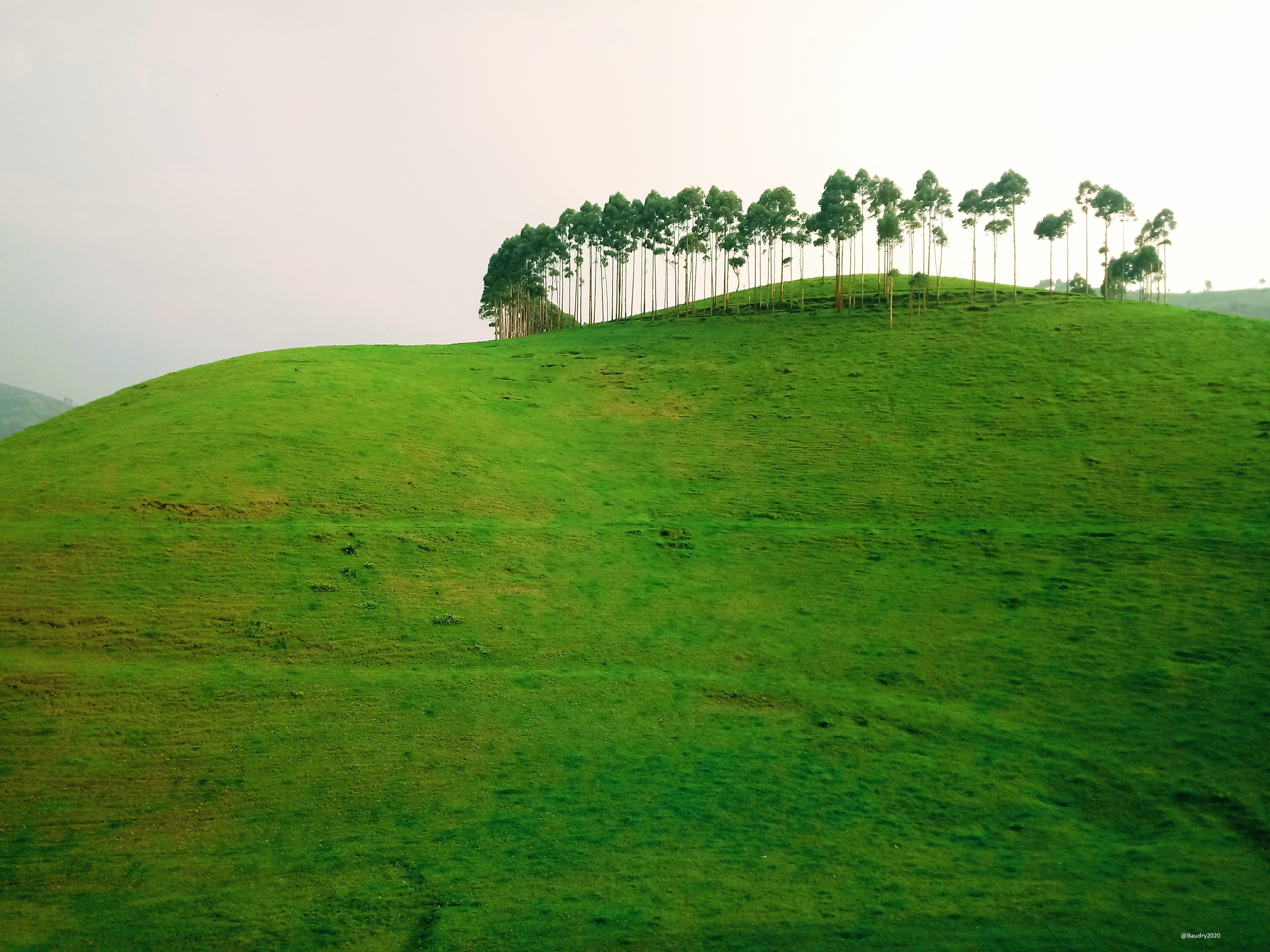
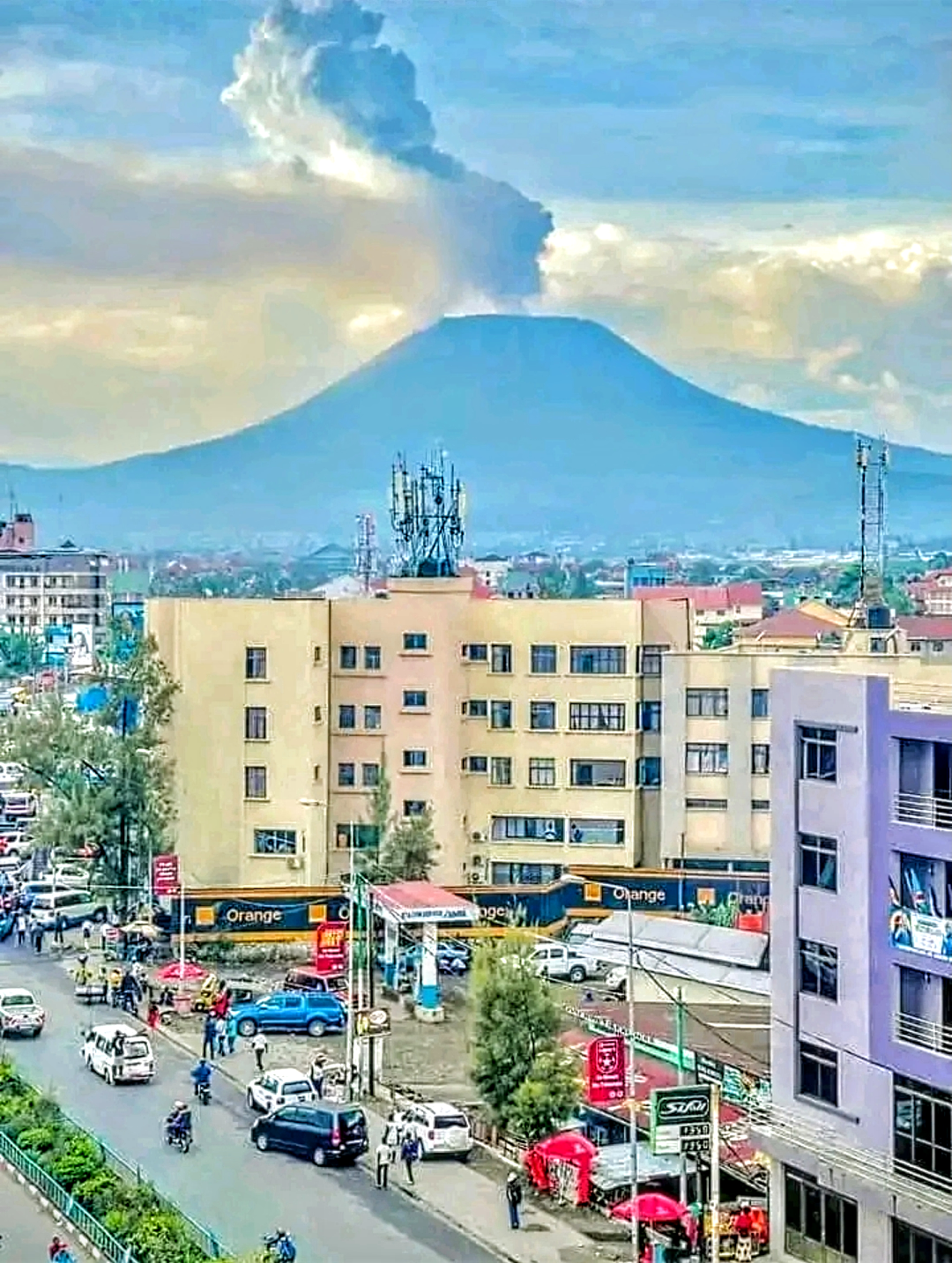
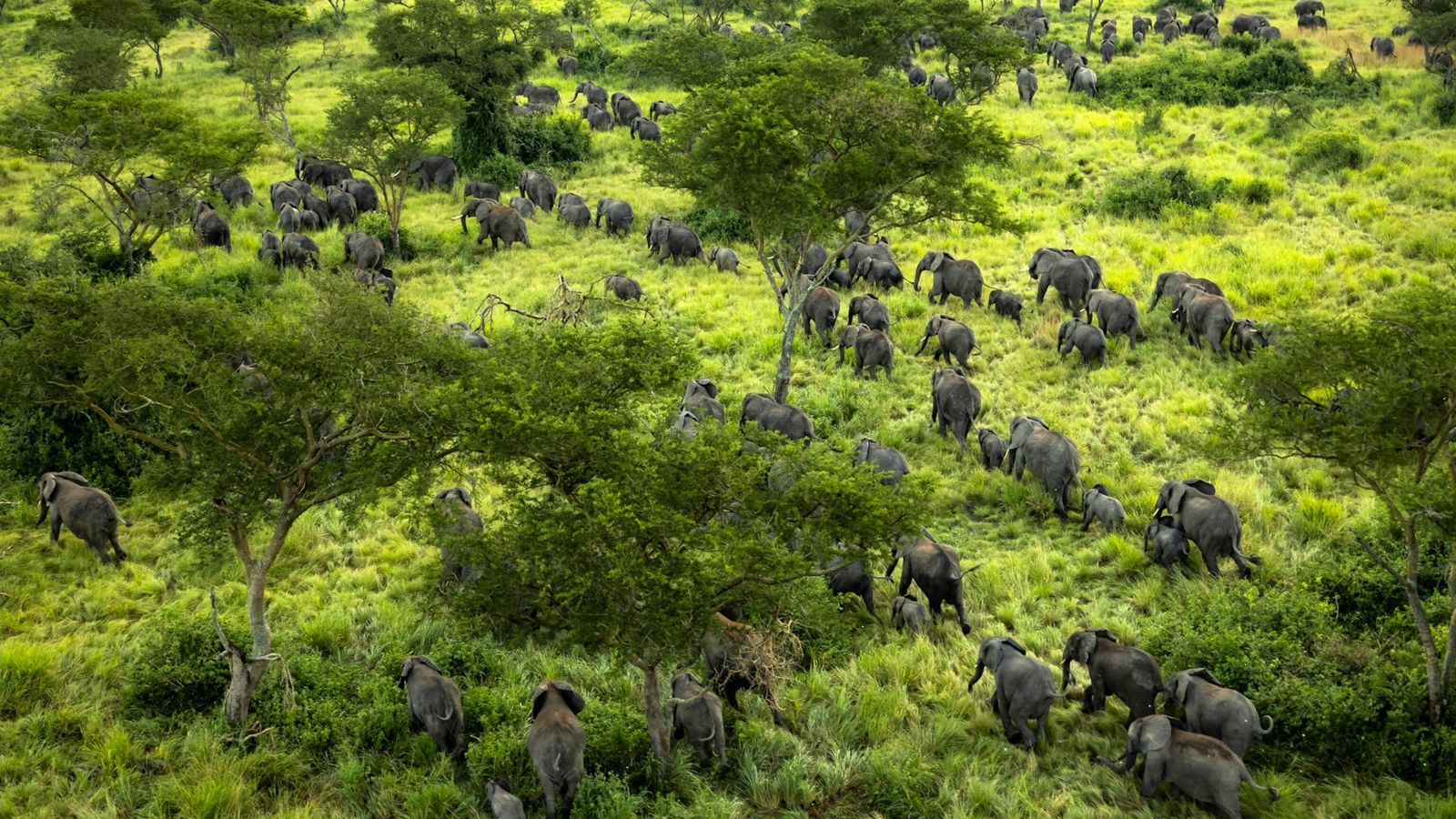
- Clockwise from top left: Mount Ngaliema; the Masisi hills; Virunga National Park; and Mount Nyiragongo as seen from the provincial capital Goma;

- Seal

- North Kivu Province
- Interactive map of North Kivu Province in the Democratic Republic of the Congo
- Coordinates: 0.6°S 29.0°E
- Country: Democratic Republic of the Congo
- Named for: Lake Kivu
- Capital: Goma (de jure); Beni (de facto)

Government
  - Governor: Evariste Somo Kakule (since 28 January 2025)

Area
  - Total: 59,483 km^{2} (22,967 sq mi)
  - Rank: 18th

Population (2020)
  - Total: 8,985,711
  - Rank: 2nd
  - Density: 151.06/km^{2} (391.25/sq mi)
- Demonym: North Kivutian

Ethnic groups
  - Native: Banande; Bahunde; Banyanga; Batembo; Balese; Babwisi; Bapere; Bakumu; Baamba; Bakonzo; Batwa (pygmies)
  - Settler: Congolese Banyarwanda
- License Plate Code: (Democratic Republic of the Congo) CGO / 19
- Official language: French
- National language: Swahili
- HDI (2023): 0.543low
- Website: www.provincenordkivu.cd

North Kivu (Swahili: Jimbo la Kivu Kaskazini) is a province bordering Lake Kivu in the eastern Democratic Republic of the Congo. The capital city is Goma. Spanning approximately 59,483 square kilometers with a population estimate of 8,985,711 as of 2020, it is bordered by Ituri to the north, Tshopo to the northwest, Maniema to the southwest, and South Kivu to the south, as well as Uganda and Rwanda to the east.

North Kivu's administrative history traces back to the colonial era when it was initially part of the Stanley Falls District within the Congo Free State. Following a series of territorial reorganizations, North Kivu became incorporated into Orientale Province, with Stanleyville (modern-day Kisangani) as the provincial capital. The area gained provincial status in 1962 but was demoted to a district under Mobutu Sese Seko's regime in 1965. It was formally reinstated in 1988 under Ordinance-Law No. 88/1976 and Ordinance-Law No. 88-031, which redefined the previous Kivu Province into tripartite separate provinces: North Kivu, South Kivu, and Maniema. Presently, North Kivu comprises three cities—Goma, Butembo, and Beni—and six territories: Beni, Lubero, Masisi, Rutshuru, Nyiragongo, and Walikale. A 2013 decree also proposed city status for Kasindi, Oicha, and Luholu. The province's eastern border is home to the Rwenzori Mountains, part of the Albertine Rift, which serves as a key freshwater source and supports a diverse ecosystem. North Kivu also hosts Virunga National Park, a UNESCO World Heritage Site home to endangered mountain gorillas.

The province is confronted with ongoing security challenges stemming from armed groups, resource-related conflicts, and ethnic tensions. The Rwandan-backed M23 rebel group has been a significant source of instability. As of early 2024, M23-related violence had displaced approximately 1.7 million people, accounting for nearly 14% of North Kivu's population.

North Kivu has been the site of multiple outbreaks of the Ebola virus disease, including the August 2022 outbreak and the ongoing 2026 Ituri Province Ebola epidemic. The province was the center of the 2018–2020 Kivu Ebola outbreak, which was the second largest in history, resulting in over 3400 cases and 2200 deaths, following the 2014–2016 West Africa Ebola outbreak.

== Geography ==
=== Relief ===
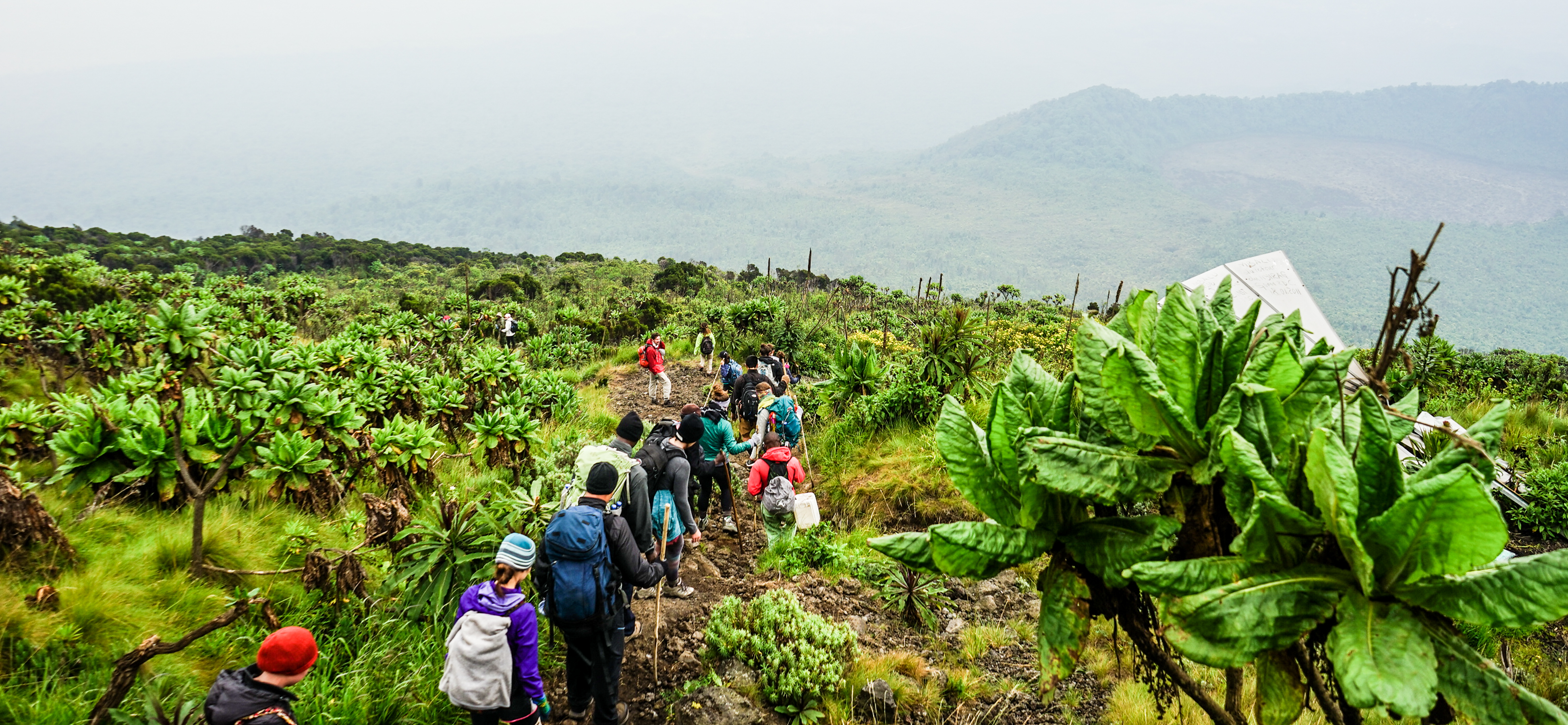
Virunga National Park

Situated along the equator, North Kivu spans latitudes from 0° 58' north to 2° 03' south and longitudes from 27° 14' west to 29° 58' east. Its topography ranges from less than 800 meters to peaks exceeding 5,000 meters in altitude, comprising diverse formations including plains, plateaus, and mountainous regions.

Notable lowland areas include the alluvial plains of Semliki and Rwindi-Rutshuru, stretching from Lake Edward's northern to southern shores. The steep Kabasha escarpment rises from Lake Edward's western bank, extending toward the Rwindi-Rutshuru plain, which is flanked by the massive Ruwenzori range (5,119 meters) to the east. Further south, the plain merges into volcanic lava fields leading to the Virunga Mountains, with prominent active volcanoes Nyamulagira (3,056 meters) and Nyiragongo (3,470 meters).

=== Hydrology ===
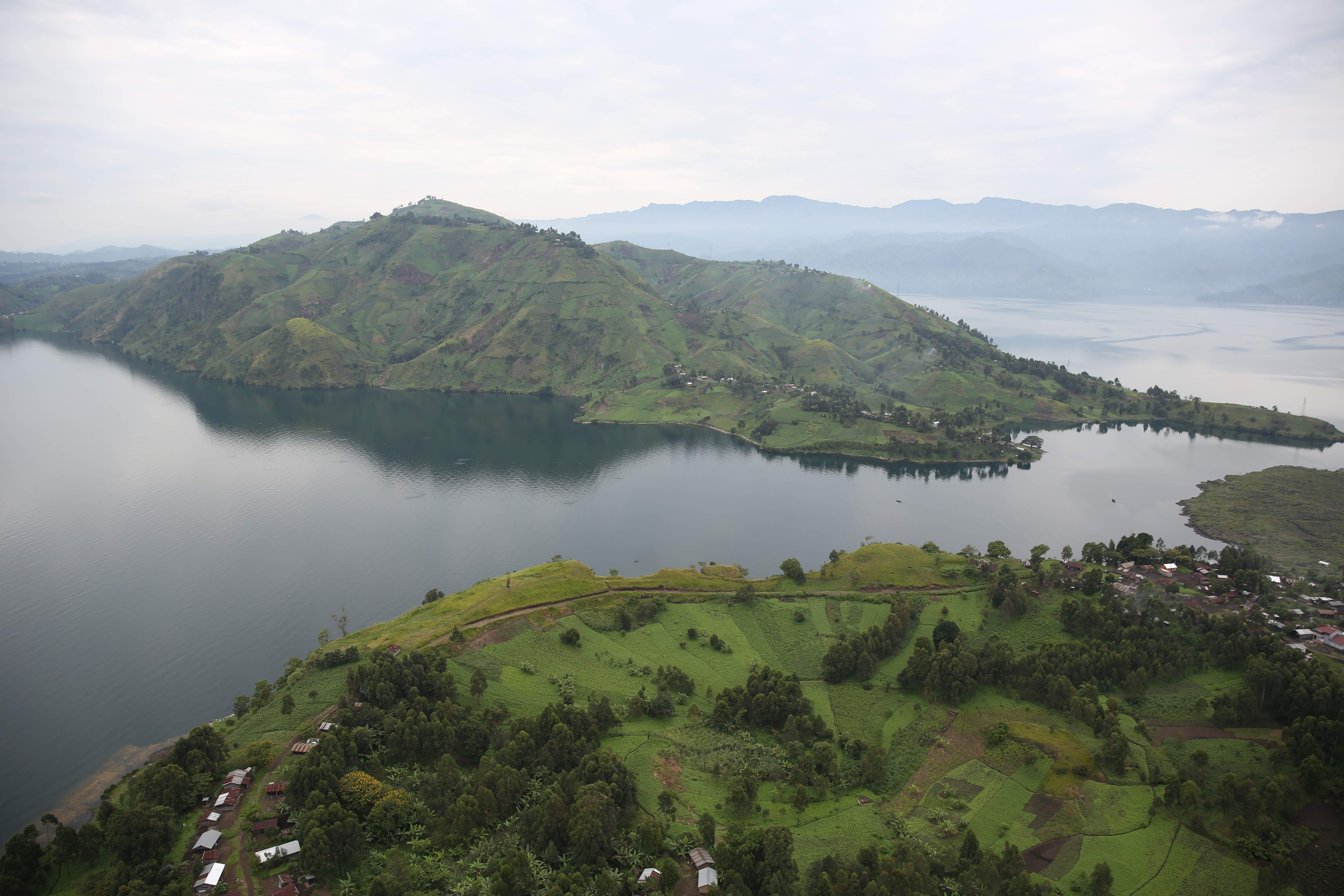
Lake Kivu in North Kivu, surrounded by lush hills

The province features two major lakes: Lake Edward and Lake Kivu. Lake Edward, covering 2,150 square kilometers with 1,630 square kilometers in Congolese territory, reaches an average depth of 30 meters. It supports a rich fish population, forming a vital economic resource for surrounding communities.

Lake Kivu, the highest lake in Central Africa, sits at an elevation of 1,460 meters, with a Congolese surface area of 2,700 square kilometers and an average depth of 285 meters. However, its fish diversity is relatively limited compared to Lake Edward. Additionally, the Mokotos Lakes, Ndalaha, Lukulu, Mbalukia, and Mbila, occupy 86 square kilometers in the Bashali Chiefdom. The provincial river system includes the Rutshuru, Rwindi, Semliki, Osso, and Lowa rivers.

=== Geology ===
==== Lithostratigraphy ====
The geology of North Kivu is defined by a complex mix of rock formations dating from the Precambrian, Phanerozoic, and Cenozoic eras.

Since 1976, three major Precambrian belts have been recognized in North Kivu, arranged chronologically. These include the Lower Proterozoic Ruzizian (Ubendian) belt, the Middle Proterozoic Kibaran (Burundian) belt, and the Upper Proterozoic Pan-African belt. The Middle Proterozoic Kibaran belt is the most significant lithostratigraphic unit in the region. Stretching for more than 2,000 km from Katanga through Kivu and into Burundi, northwestern Tanzania, and southwestern Uganda, it is one of the largest Proterozoic belts in Central and Eastern Africa.

This belt is also economically significant due to its rich mineral deposits, including tin, tungsten, gold, niobium, beryllium, nickel, chromium, iron, and others. Structurally, it is predominantly oriented northeast–southwest in the African Great Lakes region, with frequent deflections toward the northwest. Its rock composition is mainly quartzites, gneisses, mica schists, and quartz phyllites, with occasional conglomerate layers. Tectonic deformation has produced folds that typically run southwest–northeast, although in the Kivu region they shift to a southeast–northwest orientation.

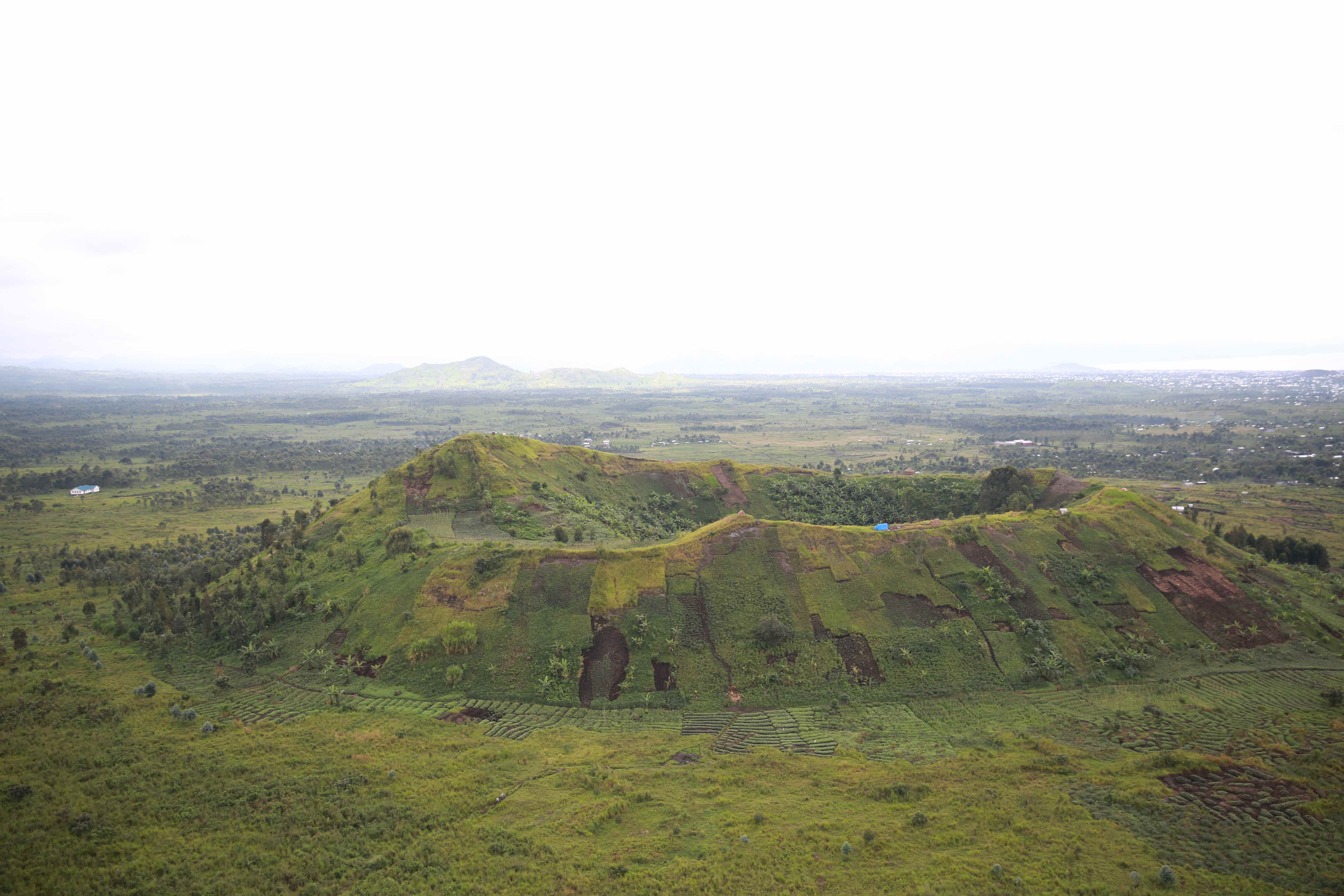
Small crater around Goma

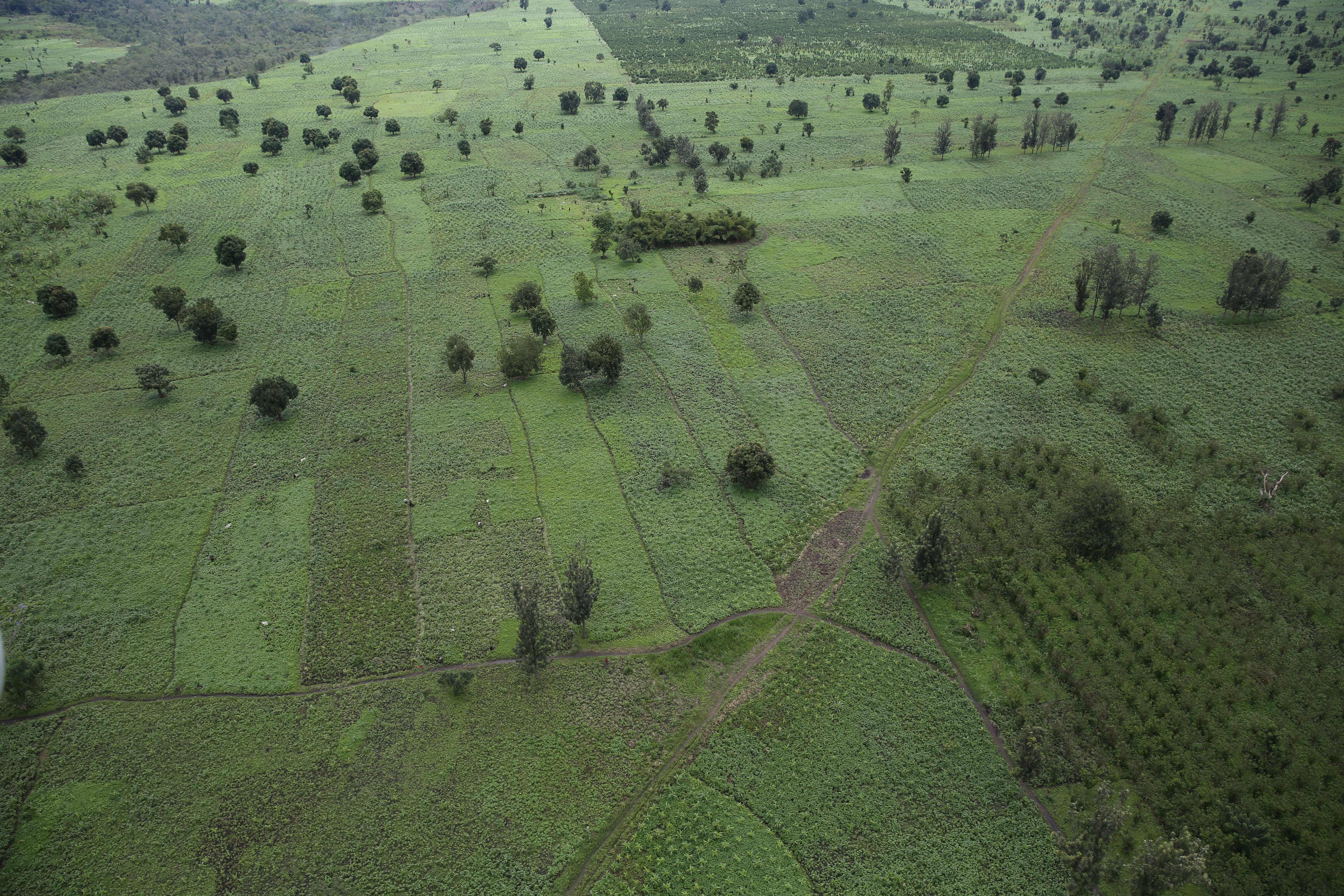
Patchwork of agricultural fields spread across the landscape of North Kivu.

The Upper Proterozoic Pan-African belt is characterized by widespread magmatic activity, including granitic intrusions with an alkaline affinity, as well as nephelinite–syenites, monzonites, and basic to ultrabasic rocks such as gabbros, dolerites, and peridotites.

Sedimentary cover formations of Phanerozoic age have been documented in Kivu by several authors, notably Nicholas Boutakoff, Lucien Cahen, Jacques Lepersonne, and Arthur Tindell Hopwood. Paleozoic formations are represented by the Lukuga Group, which ranges in age from the Carboniferous to the Upper Permian and corresponds to the Karoo sequence. From base to top, this group includes a lower glacial and periglacial formation of Lower Carboniferous age, Walikale black shales of Lower Permian age, an upper glacial and periglacial unit, the Lukuga black shales, and an Upper Permian transitional formation. Lithologically, the sequence consists of basal conglomerates overlain by sandstones, psammites, argillites, and pelitic rocks. In North Kivu, these formations crop out mainly in Walikale Territory and extend into Maniema province (southwestern Kivu).

Mesozoic formations are poorly developed in the region and are represented mainly by compacted cineritic deposits. Cenozoic and Quaternary formations consist primarily of lacustrine sediments associated with the Great Lakes Rift system, which extends from Lake Albert in the north to Lake Tanganyika in the south.

==== Pedology ====
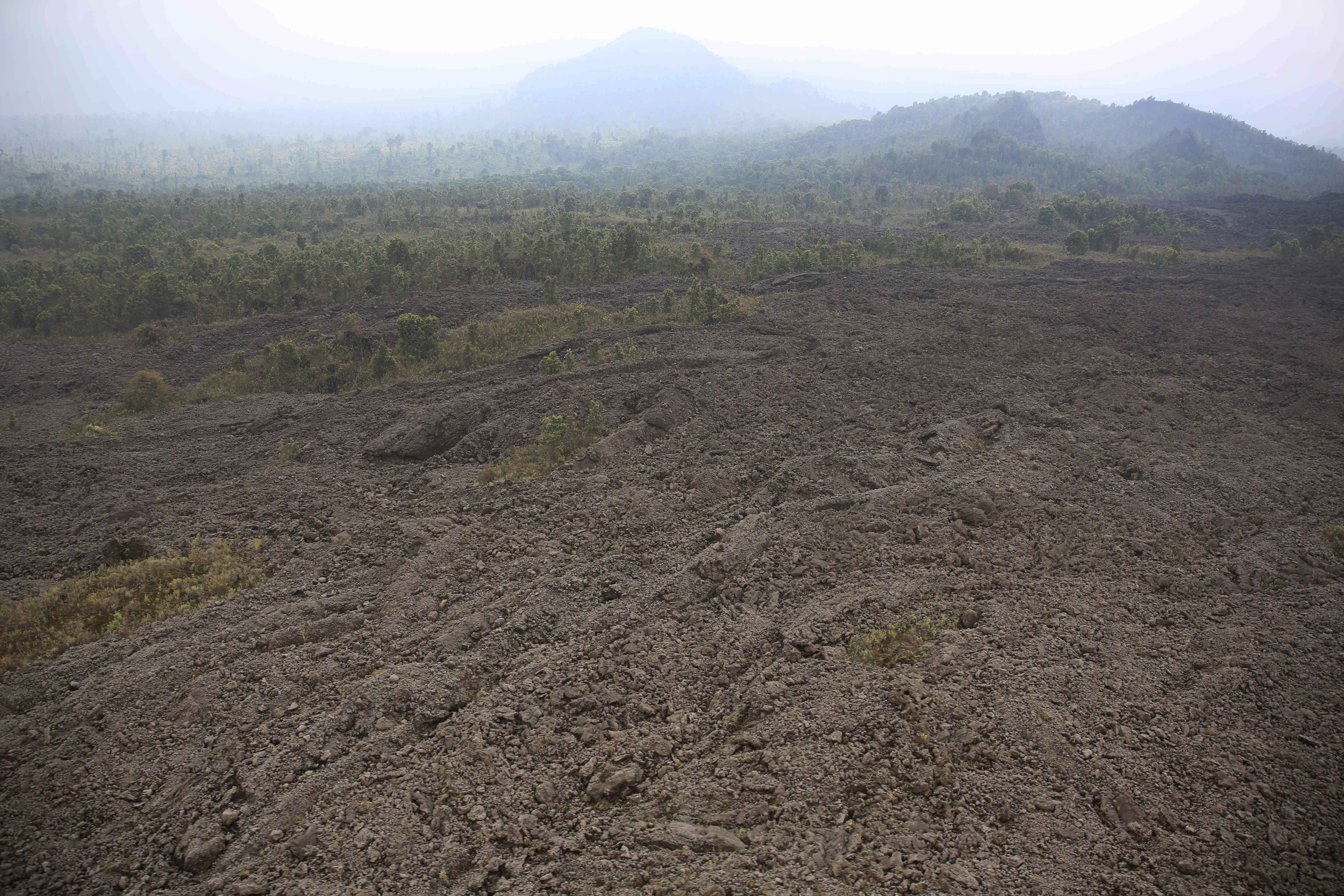
A vast lava field in Virunga National Park

Volcanic soils, derived from recent lava flows, dominate areas near active volcanoes; these soils, while fertile in older flows, are less suitable for agriculture in recent deposits. Between Goma and Rutshuru, volcanic soils are fertile yet shallow, conducive to agriculture. Alluvial soils are common in the Semliki plains, originating from lacustrine and fluvial deposits, while older, humus-rich soils are found in regions with deeper, clayey substrates, abundant in organic matter.

=== Vegetation ===
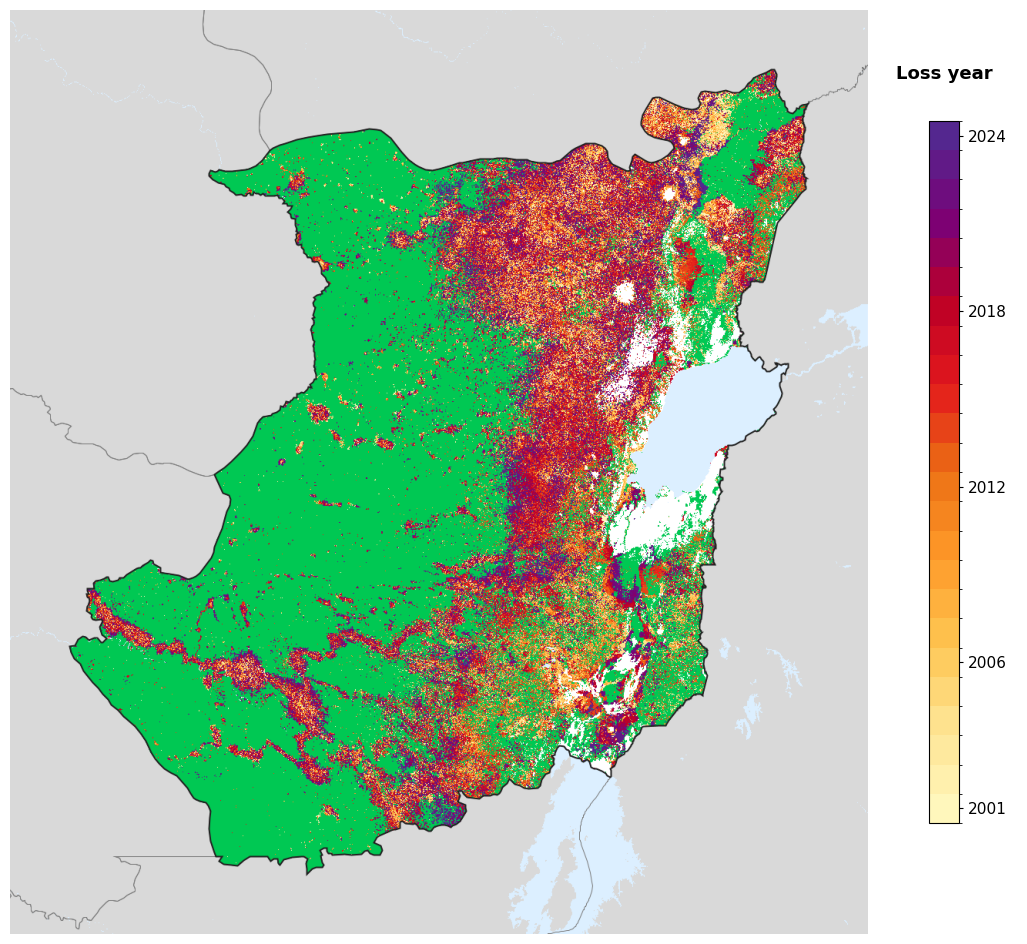
Tree-cover loss year in North Kivu, 2001-2024, from the Global Forest Change dataset.

Savannas dominate the alluvial plains of Semliki and Rutshuru, while shrubby, sclerophyllous formations are found on the lava plains north of Lake Kivu. Mountain rainforests grow primarily in the Rwenzori and Virunga massifs, while equatorial forests are extensive in the territories of Lubero, Masisi, Walikale, and Beni.

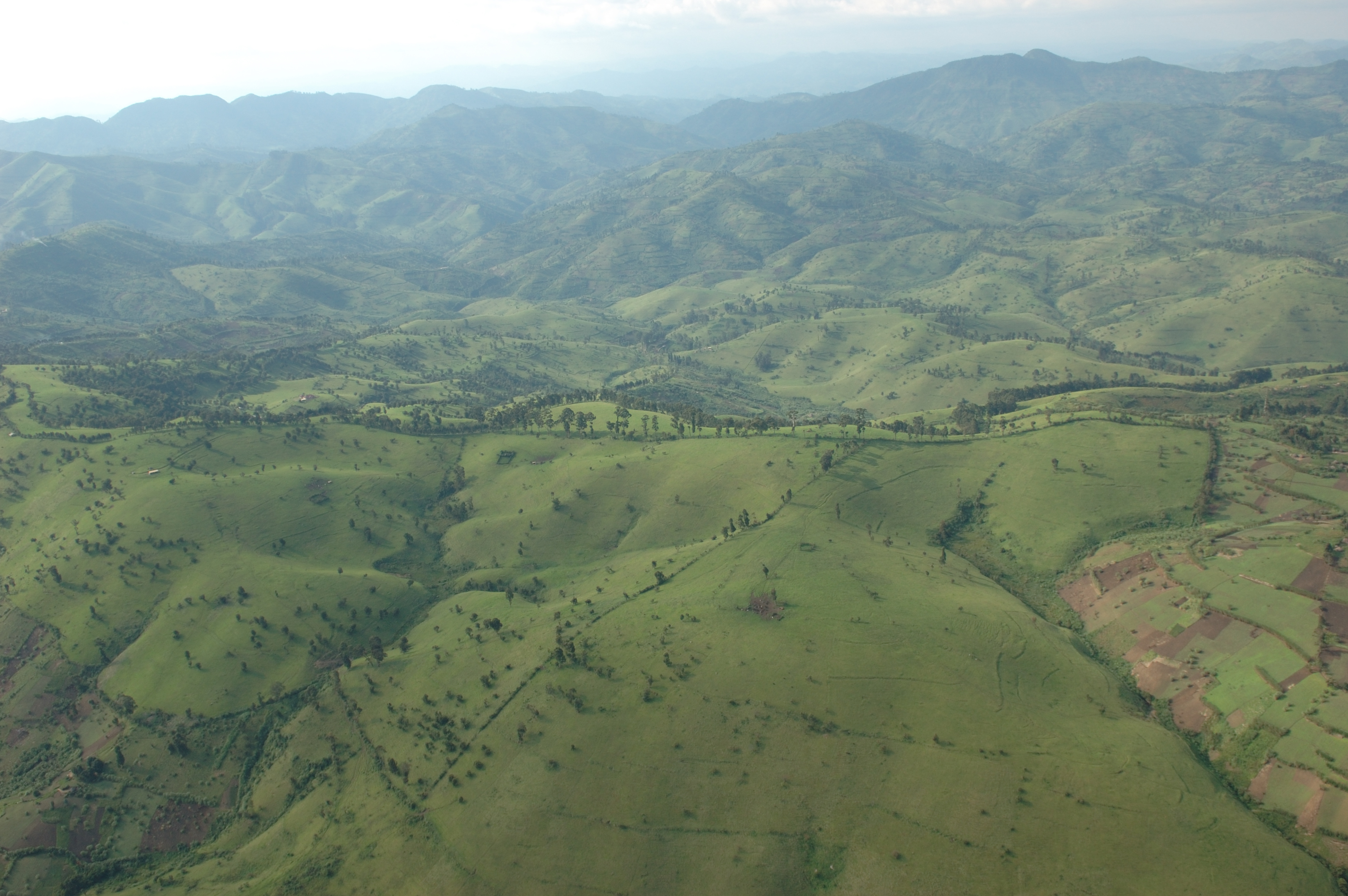
Deforested land in Masisi

Human activities have markedly influenced the province's vegetation, particularly through establishing single-species plantations, mainly comprising Eucalyptus saligna and Grevillea robusta. These plantations, alongside community-operated village plantations, constitute the principal legitimate wood-energy sources for populations proximate to Virunga National Park. Additional species, such as Acacia mearnsii, are also cultivated, often interplanted with food crops to provide supplementary revenue streams for local populations.

These monoculture plantations, extending over approximately 11,200 hectares, play an indispensable role in meeting the wood-energy demands of North Kivu's residents, particularly in Goma. In 2011, the EcoMakala project emerged as a geographically integrated REDD+ initiative to mitigate emissions from deforestation and forest degradation. Between 2020 and 2021, EcoMakala+ secured USD 1.3 million in funding, allowing North Kivu to become the first province in the Democratic Republic of the Congo to capitalize on carbon credit sales.

=== Climate ===
North Kivu's climate is greatly influenced by altitude. Temperatures decrease with elevation: areas below 1,000 meters average 23 °C, while those at 2,000 meters average 15 °C. Rainfall varies from 1,000 to 2,000 millimeters annually. Drier periods are in January–February and July–August.

The region has four distinct seasons: two wet seasons (mid-August to mid-January, mid-February to mid-July) and two short dry seasons. Within the Köppen-Geiger classification, North Kivu has a warm oceanic climate, with an annual average temperature of 18 °C and average precipitation of 363.6 millimeters.

=== Administrative division ===
Approximate correspondence between historical and current province

Approximate correspondence between historical and current province
Belgian Congo				Republic of the Congo		Zaire		Democratic Republic of the Congo	
1908	1919	1932	1947	1963	1966	1971	1988	1997	2015
22 districts	4 provinces	6 provinces	6 provinces	21 provinces + capital	8 provinces + capital	8 provinces + capital	11 provinces	11 provinces	26 provinces
Bas-Uele	Orientale	Stanleyville Province	Orientale	Uele	Orientale	Haut-Zaïre		Orientale	Bas-Uele
Haut-Uele	Orientale	Stanleyville Province	Orientale	Uele	Orientale	Haut-Zaïre		Orientale	Haut-Uele
Ituri	Orientale	Stanleyville Province	Orientale	Kibali-Ituri	Orientale	Haut-Zaïre		Orientale	Ituri
Stanleyville	Orientale	Stanleyville Province	Orientale	Haut-Congo	Orientale	Haut-Zaïre		Orientale	Tshopo
Aruwimi	Orientale	Stanleyville Province	Orientale	Haut-Congo	Orientale	Haut-Zaïre		Orientale	Tshopo
Maniema	Orientale	Costermansville	Kivu	Maniema	Kivu		Maniema		
Lowa	Orientale	Costermansville	Kivu	Maniema	Kivu		Maniema		
Kivu	Orientale	Costermansville	Kivu	Nord-Kivu	Kivu		Nord-Kivu		
Kivu	Orientale	Costermansville	Kivu	Kivu-Central	Kivu		Sud-Kivu		

North Kivu Province is systematically organized into a hierarchy of administrative divisions, which include territories, cities, chiefdoms (collectivités), sectors, groupements (groupings), and villages (localités).

==== Territories ====
North Kivu comprises six territories. These territories are led by a Territorial Administrator supported by two Assistant Territorial Administrators, who facilitate the effective governance of vast regions, often remote or rural. Appointed by the Ministry of the Interior and Security, territorial officials are part of the state's official budget. They are responsible for implementing state policies at the local level, under the oversight of the provincial governor, who serves as both the President's and Ministry's representative within the province.

The territories in North Kivu include:

Territory	Map
Beni	Beni
Lubero	Lubero
Masisi	Masisi
Nyiragongo	Nyiragongo
Rutshuru	Rutshuru
Walikale	Walikale

==== Cities ====
The province contains three cities: Goma, Butembo, and Beni. Each city is led by a mayor appointed by a presidential decree on the advice of the Minister of the Interior and Security.

- Goma: As the provincial capital and largest city, Goma is the administrative and economic center of North Kivu. Located on the northern shore of Lake Kivu and near the Rwandan border, Goma is strategically important, though it faces challenges due to periodic volcanic eruptions from nearby Mount Nyiragongo and ongoing regional conflicts.
- Butembo: Situated in the northern part of North Kivu, Butembo is a major commercial hub. The city's development, once spurred by the mining activities of the Compagnie Minière des Grands-Lacs (now SOMINKI), has positioned it as a significant center for trade, especially in agricultural products. It is well-connected to Eastern African countries through nearby transport infrastructure.
- Beni: Located in the northeastern part of the province, Beni spans an area of approximately 184.24 km^{2} at an elevation of about 800 meters. Although Beni serves as a crucial urban center, it has been affected by regional security concerns in recent years due to local conflicts.

==== Chiefdoms and sectors ====
The traditional governance of North Kivu is organized into chiefdoms (known as collectivités) and sectors. These entities represent traditional forms of authority, where leadership is often determined by ethnic customs and later formalized by the state. The head of a chiefdom holds the title "mwami" (paramount customary chief). Chiefdoms and sectors are divided into groupements, which further subdivide into villages. Village heads manage governance within these smaller divisions.

Some notable chiefdoms and sectors in North Kivu include:

- Bwito Chiefdom
- Bashu Chiefdom
- Watalinga Chiefdom
- Bashali Chiefdom
- Bahunde Chiefdom
- Osso Sector
- Katoyi Sector
- Bukumu Chiefdom
- Bwisha Chiefdom
- Bamate Chiefdom
- Bapere Sector
- Baswaga Chiefdom
- Beni Sector
- Ruwenzori Sector

== History ==
=== Early inhabitants and ethnic formation ===
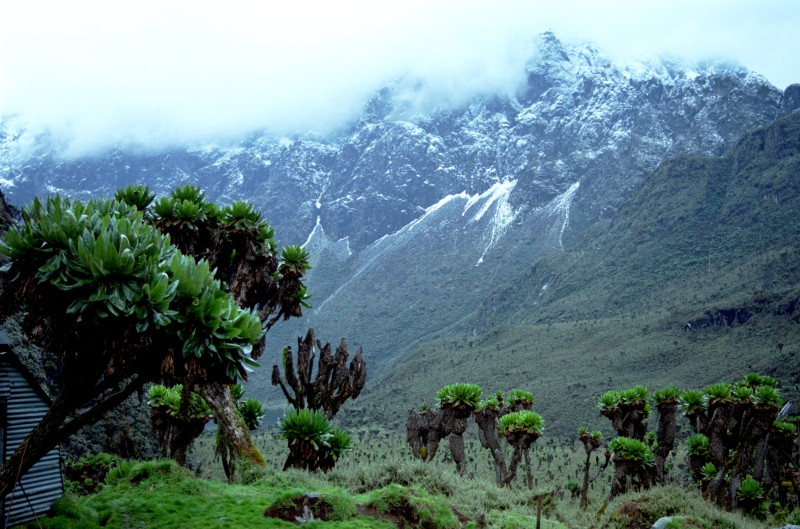
The Rwenzori Mountains

North Kivu has long been inhabited by Bantu-speaking populations, notably the Hunde people, whose historical settlement extends from the northwest of Lake Kivu to Lake Edward; the Tembo, who occupy lower-lying areas; and, further west, the Havu and the Yira (Nande). The Hutu people in Rutshuru Territory have historical and cultural connections to northern Rwanda. Settlement in North Kivu predates the timeline proposed by colonial writers, who typically placed it in the 16th and 17th centuries.

According to Alfred Moeller de Laddersous, population movements in the region followed a northeast–southwest axis, and the Bahunde and Bayira populations incorporated earlier groups such as the Bahera, Habombe, Bakira, Bahambo, Vitu, Batangi, and Bamate. Historians like Mashauri Kule Tambite argue that these populations were not migrants but have always inhabited the region. According to this view, the Yira (Nande) formed part of the Kitara Empire, and "their Rwenzori mountain range was known as Kitara-Kya-Nzururu". Bashizi Cirhagarhula, as cited by Célestin Kabuya Lumuna Sando, notes that the Bahunde have occupied their current region as early as the 9th century CE.

Hunde oral traditions, including the legend of Mulingito, which "recounts the earthquake that gave rise to Lake Kivu", describe their origins as dating "back to time immemorial". The Kingdom of Bunyoro, often connected to the Bahunde and Banyanga, evolved from the Kitara Empire, which once covered a much larger area. This historical connection is also seen across other ethnic groups in North Kivu, as shared linguistic, political, and cultural traits indicate a deep-rooted history.

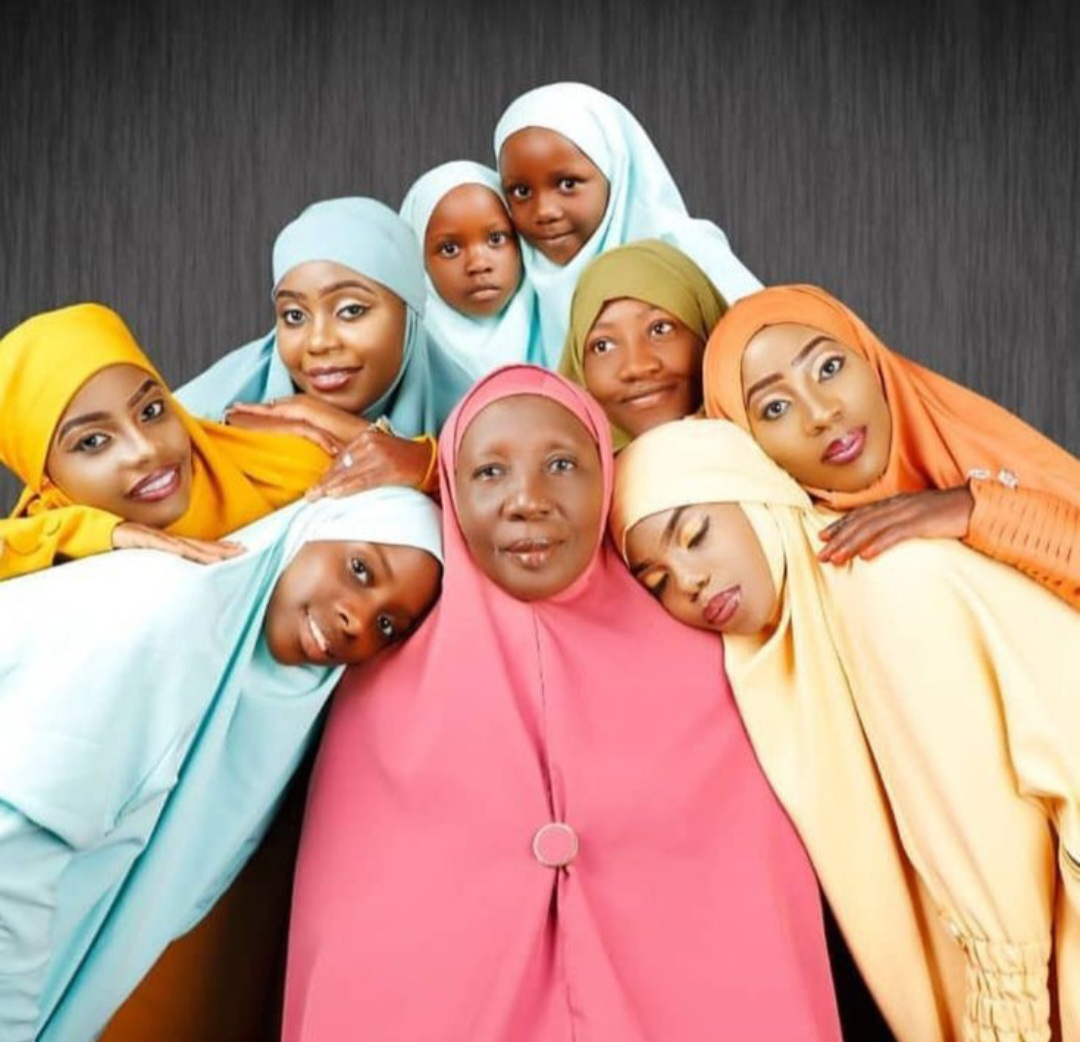
Group photo of Hunde women

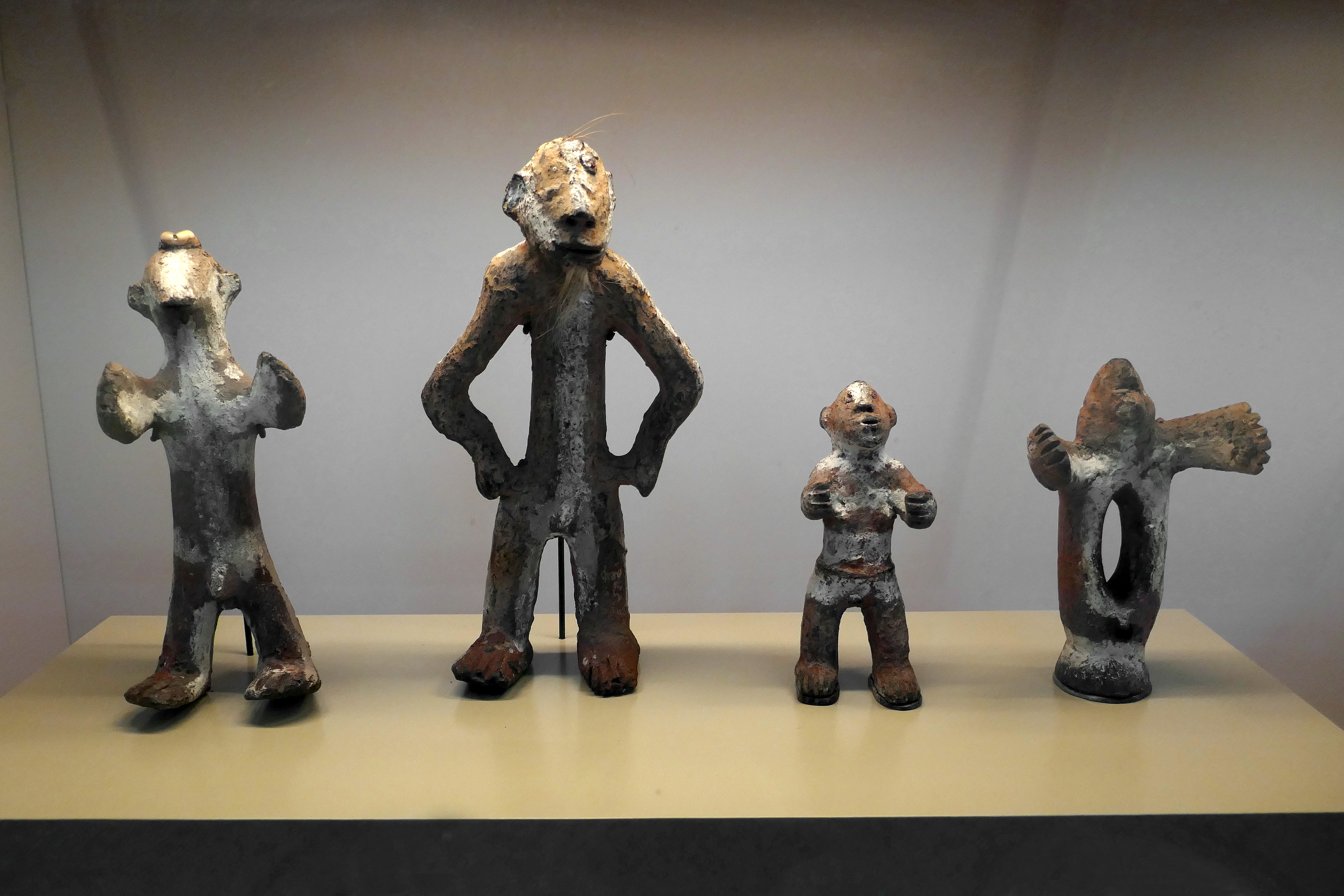
Nande clay figurines, Royal Museum for Central Africa.

As for the Bahutu of modern-day Rutshuru Territory, Moeller suggests that the "Banyarwanda (Bahutu, Batutsi, Batwa) are, however, probably not the first occupants of the region. In the southern part of Rutshuru Territory we find a population base of Bahunde origin, coming from Mitumba, across the lava plains and sandy plains of Rwindi and the Rutshuru plains". The Banyarwanda had settled in Congo before the colonial era, and although they now make up a small portion of Rutshuru Territory's population, a significant wave of Hutu immigrants from Rwanda arrived between 1914, 1949, and 1950s. In 1947, District Commissioner Gevaerts, quoted by Kabuya Lumuna, observed that "Chief Ndeze and the leading notables of Bwisha agree to cede good land to their brothers of the same race".

These Hutu immigrants, later known as the Banyabwisha, which included both Hutu and Tutsi, were granted an autonomous chiefdom by the colonial government in 1920, with Daniel Ndeze, of Hutu parentage, as its first chief. Before 1920, no Hutu had been appointed to rule an autonomous chiefdom. The term "Banyabwisha" referred to the people of the Bwisha hill, regardless of their ethnic background. Similarly, the term "Banyamulenge" refers to various ethnic groups living on the Mulenge Plateau, which each maintaining its own identity. Such terms, including Banyabwito, Banyamasisi, and Banyabwisha, are more about geographical locations than specific ethnic groups.

Scholars, including Célestin Kabuya Lumuna Sando, Jean-Claude Willame, Théophile Obenga, and Pierre Gourou, reject the idea of Banyabwisha as a distinct ethnic group, instead identifying these populations as Hutu. Willame emphasized that, unlike in Rwanda-Urundi, colonial authorities in the Congo appointed Hutu chiefs to govern immigrant populations, citing the example of Chief Ndeze II, who was enthroned in 1923. Later authors, such as Mahano Ge Mahano, similarly argued that neither Hutu nor Banyabwisha were indigenous to Bwisha before the early 20th century, and linked their settlement to missionary activity following the establishment of the Rugari Catholic mission in 1911.

Mahano explained that these early Rwandophone immigrants settled around the Bwisha parish and created what became a "mission village". Thus, the term "Banyabwisha" appears to be a relatively recent invention and is more closely associated with the Hutu than the Tutsi. The Hutu, who consider themselves native to the Congo, even formed an association called Nyiragongo and signed a 35-page document in 1996 to assert their autochthony in the Rutshuru Territory. In the document, addressed to the National Electoral Commission (Commission Nationale des Elections; CNS), a body established in 1996 to oversee the elections planned for 1997, the Hutu claim to be the indigenous group and explicitly exclude the Tutsi from their territory, notably omitting Masisi Territory from their claim.

=== Colonial and post-colonial history ===
The frontiers of the Congo Free State were defined by the Neutrality Act during the 1885 Berlin Conference, in which the European powers staked out their territorial claims in Africa. The Congo Free State's northeastern boundary was defined in 1885 as "a straight line coming from the northern end of Lake Tanganyika and ending at a point located on the 30th east meridian and at 1° 20' south latitude; further north, the border is formed by the 30th meridian east." On this basis, all of Lake Kivu and both banks of the Ruzizi River were in the Free State.

In June 1909, John Methuen Coote started the Kivu frontier incident when he travelled southwest from the British Uganda Protectorate and established fortified camps at Burungu and Rubona on Lake Kivu. British troops under Coote withdrew from the Rubona post on 29 June 1909 and the Belgians occupied the post. After a series of incidents, the boundaries of the Congo, Uganda and Rwanda were settled in May 1910, with the eastern part of Kivu assigned to Uganda and the German colony of Rwanda. Kivu District was created by an arrêté royal of 28 March 1912, which divided the Congo into 22 districts.

Rutshuru was elevated to district status in 1914, retaining this designation until 1920, when the provincial capital was transferred to Bukavu (then Costermansville). Since the colonial reorganization into chiefdoms in 1912, Rutshuru Territory has been composed of two principal chiefdoms: Bwisha and Bwito. Between 1912 and 1920, Bwisha, then known as Binja, was ruled by Bikamiro, a Hunde customary chief. After Bikamiro refused to comply with colonial orders, he was removed from power and deported "to an unknown location, from which he never returned". Untraditionally, Daniel Ndeze, a Hutu immigrant and police officer under Mr. Preumont (the Assistant Administrator of Rutshuru Territory), took over as chief.

In 1940, the colonial administration created the Gishari Chiefdom in Masisi Territory specifically for the Banyarwanda settlers, which led to a separate administrative area. This decision created tension between the Banyarwanda and local traditional chiefs over control of the Gishari enclave. By 1954, Kivu District had been split into Sud-Kivu District and Nord-Kivu District. In 1957, the Belgian authorities dissolved the Gishari Chiefdom and incorporated it into the Bahunde Chiefdom, with Bweremana as its chief town.

Later administrative changes led to the establishment of the current Bashali Chiefdom in December 1977, which was divided into four sectors: Bahunde Chiefdom, Osso Sector, Katoyi Sector, and Bashali Chiefdom. The ongoing struggle for autochthony and control over traditional and modern political power has been a significant source of division among the ethnic groups in North Kivu (including Hunde, Nande, Tutsi, and Hutu), with competition arising from disputes over land ownership, political influence, economic power, and intellectual leadership.

=== First Congo War ===
==== Military escalation and refugee camp attacks ====
The First Congo War, which began in mid-October 1996, made North Kivu a central battleground of military operations and humanitarian crises as the newly formed Alliance of Democratic Forces for the Liberation of Congo (AFDL) led by Laurent-Désiré Kabila, together with the Rwandan Patriotic Army (RPA) under Paul Kagame, launched a campaign to overthrow the regime of Mobutu Sese Seko in Zaire. The AFDL and RPA justified their incursion by accusing Mobutu of marginalizing the Tutsi population and harboring perpetrators of the 1994 Rwandan genocide. Alternate reports, including those from the United Nations Security Council, implicated both factions in the systematic looting of Zaire's mineral wealth and perpetrating massacres throughout the conflict.

At the onset, North Kivu hosted a significant population of Rwandan refugees, estimated by the United Nations High Commissioner for Refugees (UNHCR) to number 717,991 in October 1996. Refugee camps, including Kibumba (194,986), Katale (202,566), and Kahindo (112,875), were strategically situated along the Rutshuru corridor north of Goma. Additional camps, such as Mugunga (156,115) and Lac Vert (49,449), were located westward on the Sake route. These camps, positioned near critical transit routes and the Rwandan border, became focal points of military confrontation.

A map of the AFDL offensive

On the evening of 27 June 1996, a clandestine Rwandan unit allegedly infiltrated the Kibumba refugee camp in Nyiragongo Territory, resulting in the deaths of three refugees, two soldiers from the Contingent Zaïrois pour la Sécurité des Camps (CZSC), and three Red Cross wardens. By October, the AFDL and RPA intensified their offensive, bombarding the Kibumba camp with heavy artillery on the night of 25–26 October, which left an indeterminate number of refugees dead and obliterating the camp's hospital.

Over 194,000 survivors fled toward Mugunga, while simultaneous assaults decimated Katale Camp despite initial resistance from Forces Armées Zairoises (FAZ)/CZSC personnel, ex-FAR combatants, and Interahamwe militias. Reports indicate several dozen refugees and one CZSC soldier were killed during the assault. By 31 October, AFDL and RPA forces had reportedly executed hundreds of refugees who remained in Kahindo Camp. The United Nations Special Rapporteur on human rights violations in Zaire, Roberto Garretón, later estimated 143 deaths at Katale Camp and between 100 and 200 deaths at Kahindo Camp.

==== Mass displacement and escalating violence ====
As the AFDL–RPA offensive escalated, fear and desperation prompted some refugees to attempt repatriation to Rwanda. 26–31 Between October, approximately 900 refugees crossed the Mutura border, according to UNHCR records. However, this exodus was perilous, with numerous reports of intimidation, coercion, and outright killings by AFDL–RPA soldiers targeting those seeking assistance.

The scale of the violence against refugees became evident through reports from local organizations. NGOs such as the Équipe d'urgence de la biodiversité (EUB), the Association des Volontaires du Zaïre (ASVOZA), and the Zairean Red Cross documented the mass burials of victims to prevent outbreaks of epidemics. From 2–30 November, 2,087 bodies were buried in and around the Kibumba camp. Between 30 November 1996 and 26 January 1997, an additional 1,919 bodies were buried in the same area.

At Kahindo Camp, 281 bodies were buried between 1–25 December 1996. At Katale Camp, 970 bodies were buried between 1 December 1996 and 18 January 1997. According to the DRC Mapping Exercise Report, many of the victims' hands were bound, and bodies were often discovered in public pit latrines.

By 1 November 1996, all refugee camps between Goma and Rutshuru had been dismantled. The Kibumba camp's survivors moved toward Mugunga, while those from Kahindo and Katale were scattered into the dense forests of Virunga National Park. Attempting to evade interception by AFDL–RPA forces, refugees wandered through the park's inhospitable terrain for weeks. The volcanic landscape, marked by lava fields, offered little access to drinking water, leading to deaths from thirst and starvation.

Checkpoints established between Mount Nyiragongo and Mugunga became sites of mass killings. Survivors reported that refugees intercepted at the park's exit were sorted by age and gender, with adult men systematically executed. The violence extended to makeshift camps within Virunga National Park, where refugees who sought temporary shelter were targeted. By February 1997, reports from local witnesses indicated that bodies of newly deceased refugees were discovered daily near the former Kibumba camp. One of the most harrowing incidents occurred in April 1997 near Mwaro, close to the village of Kibumba. On April 9 AFDL–RPA soldiers intercepted refugees attempting to return to Rwanda. The victims were imprisoned in a mosque and a former farm building before being killed on 11 April. The number of victims is unknown, but accounts suggest the massacre claimed several hundred lives.

==== Pursuit of refugees in Masisi Territory ====
In mid-November 1996, the Masisi Territory became a critical site of pursuit and systematic violence as the AFDL and RPA advanced in their campaign. Their primary targets were refugees, mainly Rwandans, and ex-FAR/Interahamwe combatants fleeing westward towards Walikale. These columns of escapees, slowed by exhaustion and the harsh terrain, established temporary camps in villages across Masisi Territory, including Osso, Kinigi, Katoyi, Kilolirwe, Ngandjo, Nyamitaba, Miandja, Nyaruba, Kirumbu, and Kahira. Survivors from decimated camps such as Mugunga, Kibumba, Kahindo, and Katale were disproportionately represented among these disparate groups. The attack on refugees and Internally displaced persons escalated on 19 November 1996 when Mayi-Mayi fighters aligned with AFDL–RPA forces attacked Ngungu village. Backed by artillery, they indiscriminately slaughtered an estimated several hundred refugees and ex-FAR/Interahamwe combatants. Reports from the United Nations and local witnesses indicate that no effort was made to distinguish civilians from combatants, with women and children among the fatalities. In the days that followed, massacres continued, including in Osso, where an improvised refugee camp near a local farm became a site of mass killing, with eyewitnesses reporting between 20 and 100 bodies in the aftermath, although the true death toll was likely higher. In early December 1996, AFDL–RPA forces attacked a makeshift camp in Mbeshe Mbeshe in Katoyi Chiefdom, killing hundreds of refugees and Zaireans indiscriminately, with survivors describing how the camp became a death trap as soldiers opened fire on unarmed civilians.

On 8 November 1996, survivors from the Kahindo and Katale camps sought refuge in Bashali Chiefdom but were again targeted by AFDL–RPA soldiers, who around 18 November stormed a makeshift camp at Rukwi and carried out a series of raids over the following weeks and months that killed an indeterminate number of refugees. In late November, atrocities were reported in Miandja, where AFDL–RPA units killed approximately 50 civilians, including 40 Rwandan refugees and 10 local Hutu Banyarwanda. Refugees who had established settlements at Karunda in Kirumbu village and on the Nyabura plantation in the Bashali-Mokoto groupement faced a similar fate. In April 1997, AFDL–RPA forces attacked a school in the village of Humule, near Karuba, roughly fifty kilometers from Goma, killing 53 refugees. Other violence followed in May 1997 when AFDL–RPA units intercepted a group of refugees heading to the Karuba UNHCR transit center, where they hoped to facilitate their return to Rwanda. On 29 May, four people, including a child and an employee of the international NGO Save the Children, were killed in the village of Karuba.

==== Systematic violence against Hutu refugees in Walikale Territory ====
In November 1996, Walikale Territory became a critical transit corridor and a deadly trap for Rwandan refugees fleeing the advancing AFDL and RPA, as displaced populations entered the area via three main routes: from Bukavu through Bunyakiri, through the forests of Kahuzi-Biéga National Park and Nyabibwe, and from North Kivu via southern Masisi Territory through Busurungi and Biriko. While armed men in these groups often managed to escape, the slowest refugees, mainly women, children, and the elderly, became the primary targets of the AFDL–RPA's systematic attacks. On 9 December 1996, the AFDL–RPA forces committed one of their deadliest massacres at the Hombo Bridge, where they shot dead several hundred refugees. Many of the victims were women and children. In the following days, soldiers committed other atrocities near Kampala, a town close to Hombo. Refugees were burned alive along the road, while many women were subjected to sexual violence before being killed. In Chambucha, four kilometers from Hombo, soldiers intercepted several hundred refugees, including a significant number of women and children, and executed them near the Lowa River. Victims were killed either by gunfire or by brutal methods involving hammers and hoes. Deceptively lured with promises of UNHCR assistance for repatriation, most of the victims' bodies were discarded in the Lowa River. By mid-December 1996, AFDL–RPA forces advanced on the makeshift camps in Biriko, located in the Walowa-Luanda groupement. Refugees here were surrounded by soldiers from Ziralo and Bunyakiri in South Kivu and Ngungu in North Kivu. Hundreds of refugees, including women and children, were killed in the Biriko camps through shootings or by being bludgeoned with hoes. Locals were forced to bury some of the victims, while others were discarded in the Nyawaranga River.

The violence then spread to nearby villages, including Kilambo, Busurungi, Nyamimba, and Kifuruka. In Kifuruka, located 10 kilometers from Biriko, several hundred refugees were reportedly killed in December 1996. During the third week of December 1996, AFDL–RPA units committed mass killings in Musenge, a locality between Hombo and Walikale. Hundreds of refugees were executed as part of a broader system of targeted extermination. A similar system was implemented in Itebero, where special units systematically hunted down refugees throughout December 1996. In Mutiko locality, refugees intercepted at checkpoints were transported to Mukito village under the pretense of being prepared for UNHCR-assisted repatriation. However, the victims were instead led to their deaths, being killed with sticks, hammers, and axes. Indigenous residents were coerced into participating in the killings and were later forced to bury the bodies. In the Nyarusukula district of Walikale, which had been transformed into a restricted military zone, hundreds of refugees were killed. Civilians were prohibited from entering the area, and most of the victims' bodies were disposed of in the Lowa River and its tributaries. In early 1997, more killings were reported at the Kariki makeshift camp, 13 kilometers from Walikale. Refugees who sought safety here became easy targets for the AFDL–RPA forces, and most of the victims' bodies were left unburied.

=== Second Congo War ===
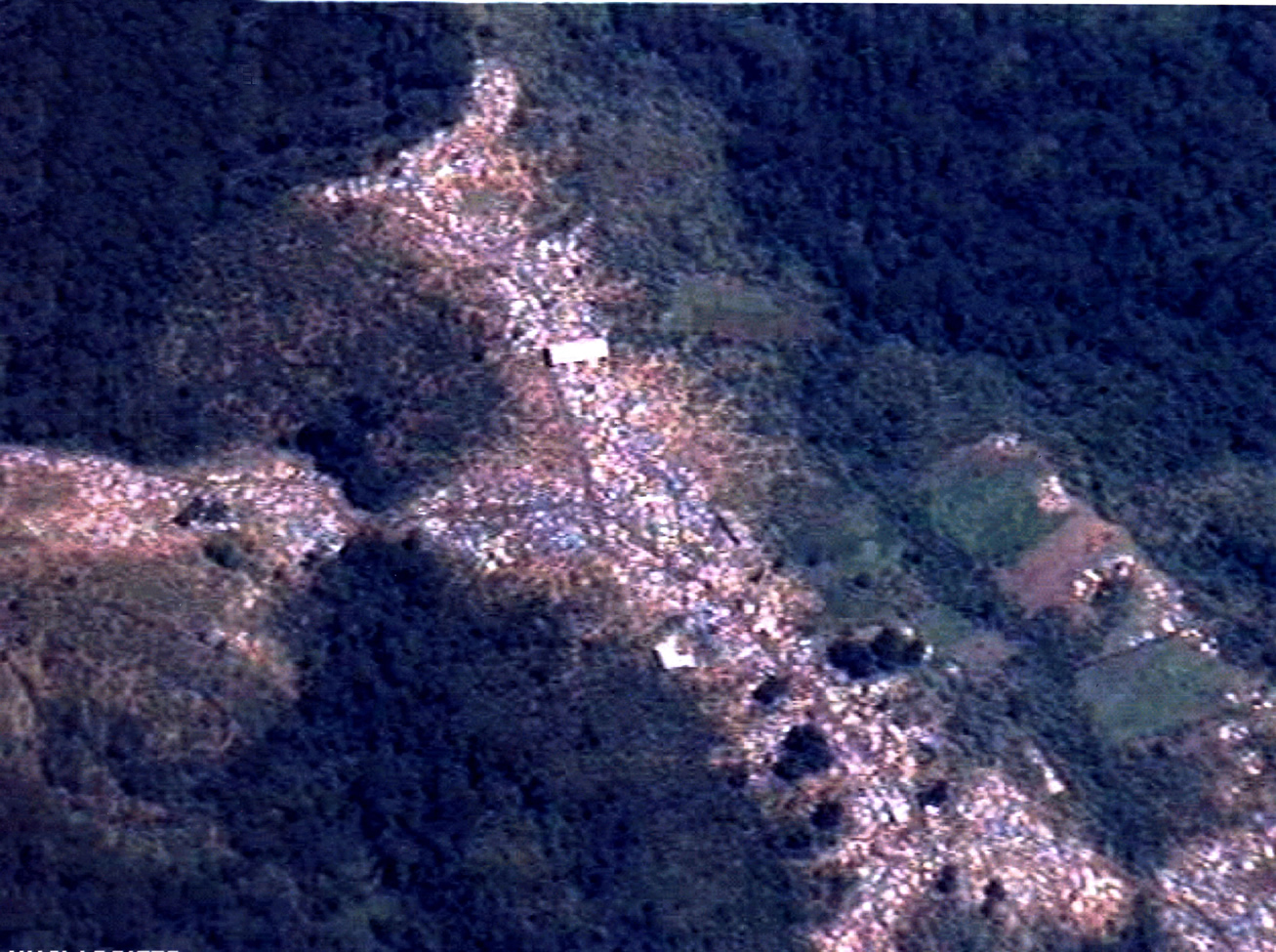
Aerial photograph of the Mihanda refugee camp

The Second Congo War profoundly affected the province, as conflict erupted due to deteriorating relations between President Laurent-Désiré Kabila, Rwanda, and Tutsi soldiers within the AFDL. By late 1997, tensions mounted as Kabila faced allegations of marginalizing Tutsi factions in his government and favoring his Katangan affiliates. Other reports suggested that the United States provided military assistance to Rwanda in the lead-up to the war, ostensibly motivated by access to Congo's vast natural resources. A U.S. Army Rwanda Interagency Assessment Team (RIAT) was deployed to Rwanda in July 1998 to train Rwandan units. The presence of U.S. forces sparked controversy, as it coincided with the outbreak of hostilities in the DRC. American photojournalist and war correspondent Keith Harmon Snow asserted that Roger Winter, a key figure in the U.S. Committee for Refugees and Immigrants, orchestrated U.S.-endorsed insurgencies in Congo and neighboring states, including Rwanda, Sudan, and Uganda. In July 1998, driven by fears of a coup d'état, President Laurent-Désiré Kabila relieved Rwandan General James Kabarebe of his position as Chief of Staff of the Congolese army, while also issuing an order for the Rwandan Patriotic Army (RPA) soldiers to withdraw from Congolese territory. These actions provoked Rwanda and Uganda to support a new rebellion aimed at removing Kabila from power. On 2 August 1998, a mutiny within the Congolese military, the Forces Armées Congolaises (FAC), was announced on Radio-Télévision Nationale Congolaise (RTNC) in Goma. The mutiny led to the formation of the Rassemblement Congolais pour la Démocratie (RCD-Goma), a Tutsi-dominated rebel group supported by Rwanda. On the same day, the city of Goma fell into the hands of RCD-Goma and RPA without significant resistance. Goma remained under rebel control for nearly three years, from August 1998 to January 2001.

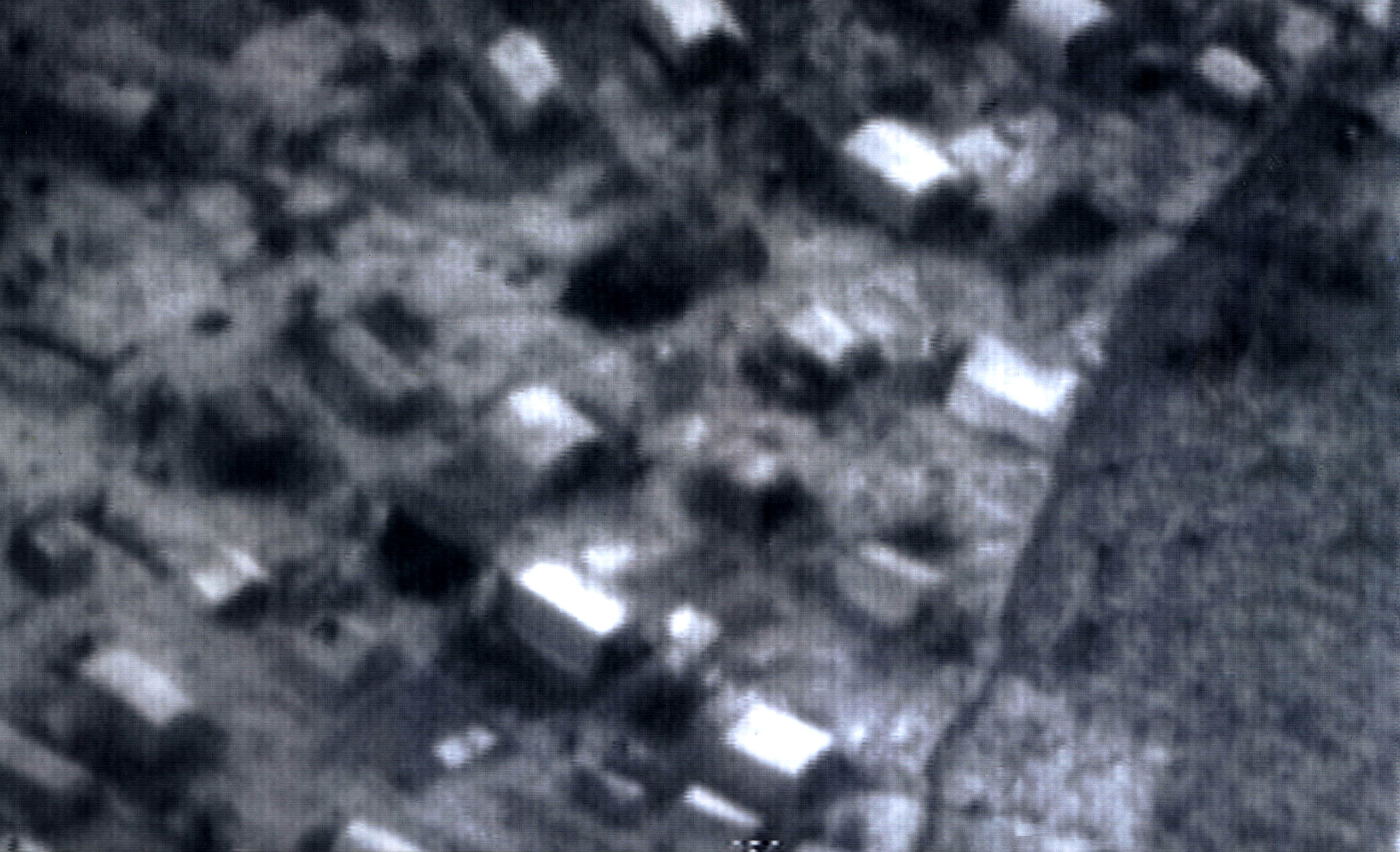
Zairean refugees in Sake in 1996

On 25 February 1999, RCD-Goma and RPA forces massacred 45 civilians in Lukweti, Masisi Territory. Subsequent airstrikes by the FAC in May 1999 targeted Goma neighborhoods, including Mukosasenge in Karisimbi, which resulted in civilian casualties. Around 8 August 1999, RCD-Goma and RPA killed at least 17 civilians in the village of Otobora in Walikale Territory, many of whom were displaced persons from the neighboring village of Hombo. On 12 August 1999, RCD-Goma and RPA killed 44 civilians in the village of Miano in Masisi Territory, predominantly women and children of Tembo ethnicity. Victims were targeted based on their ethnic origin. Around 23 November 1999, RCD-Goma and RPA killed an unknown number of civilians in the village of Ngenge in Walikale Territory, and indiscriminately opening fire on residents. On 24 November, RCD-Goma and RPA soldiers beat a group of senior figures in the village to death. The same soldiers "killed civilians in the neighboring villages of Kangati and Kaliki". On 5 February 2000, at least 30 people were killed by RCD-Goma and RPA forces in the village of Kilambo, Masisi Territory. A local NGO identified 27 victims.

During this period, members of the ALiR (Armée pour la Libération du Rwanda) also attacked civilians in Walikale Territory and Masisi Territory. In January 2000, ALiR forces killed approximately 100 civilians in the village of Luke, Walikale Territory, accusing them of collaborating with RCD-Goma and RPA forces. Most of the victims were killed with machetes or shot. On 9 July 2000, ALiR attacked a displaced persons' camp in Sake, killing 34–42 civilians, mostly women and children of Hunde and Tembo ethnicity.

==== UPDF operations and Mayi-Mayi resistance ====
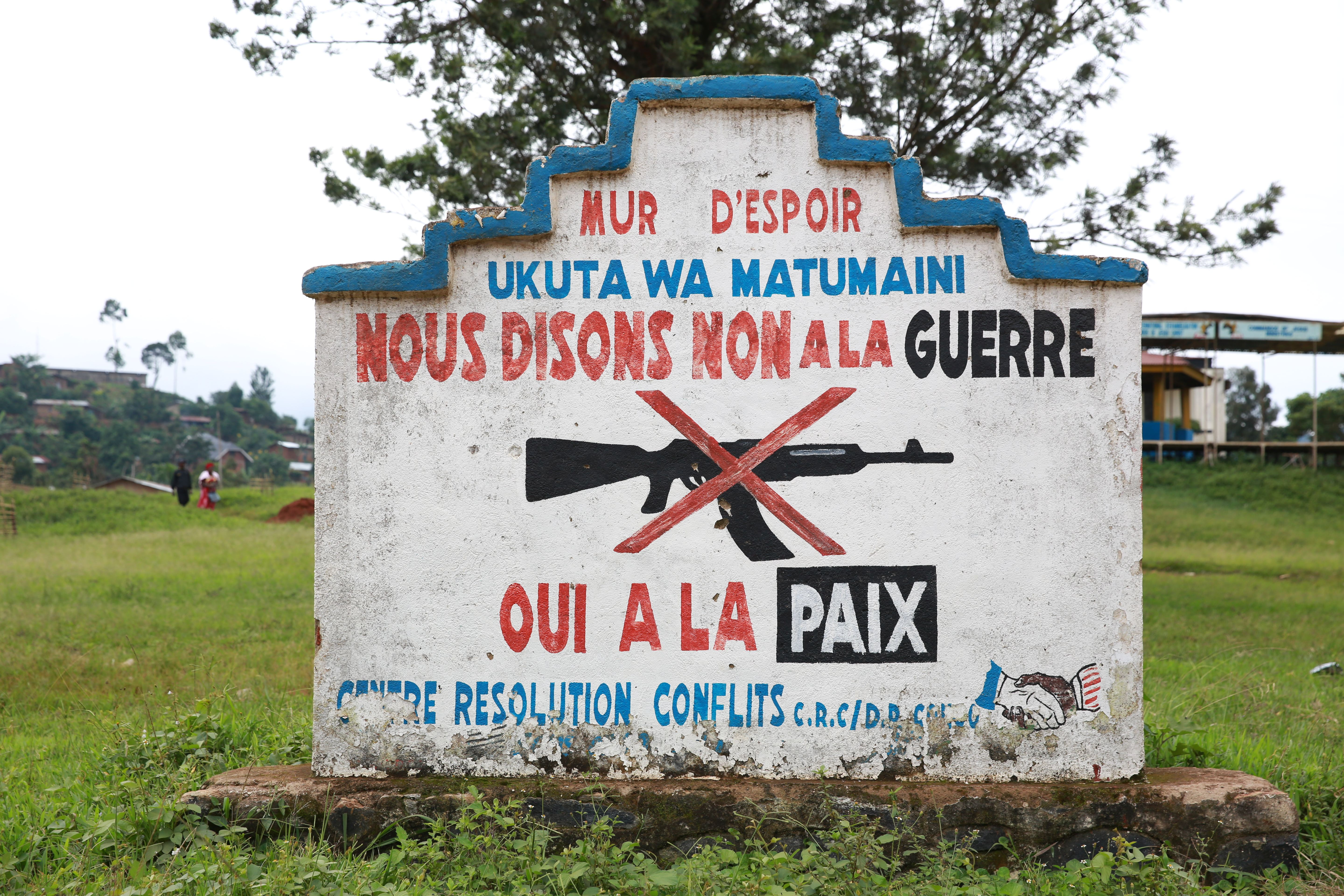
Beni's Wall of Hope, December 2014: MONUSCO, FARDC, and the Congolese people united in saying no to war, striving to end the massacres of civilians.

On 7 August 1998, the Uganda People's Defence Force (UPDF) took control of Beni without opposition. However, this occupation provoked substantial local resistance, with youth in Beni and Lubero joining the Mayi-Mayi groups. Supported by financial and military support from the Kinshasa government, the Mayi-Mayi launched attacks on UPDF convoys and engaged in violent confrontations with Ugandan forces.

These clashes were also compounded by internal rivalries within Mayi-Mayi factions, notably between Chief Lolwako Poko Poko's Vurondo Mayi-Mayi and Chief Mudohu's forces. Efforts by the RCD-ML (Rally for Congolese Democracy–Liberation Movement) to incorporate these groups into its armed wing, the Armée Patriotique Congolaise (APC), failed, and led to intensified violence. In August 2000, confrontations between Vurondo Mayi-Mayi fighters and APC–UPDF troops in Lubero resulted in dozens of deaths, including civilians. Reports indicate that 17 civilians were killed, and seven Mayi-Mayi prisoners were summarily executed.

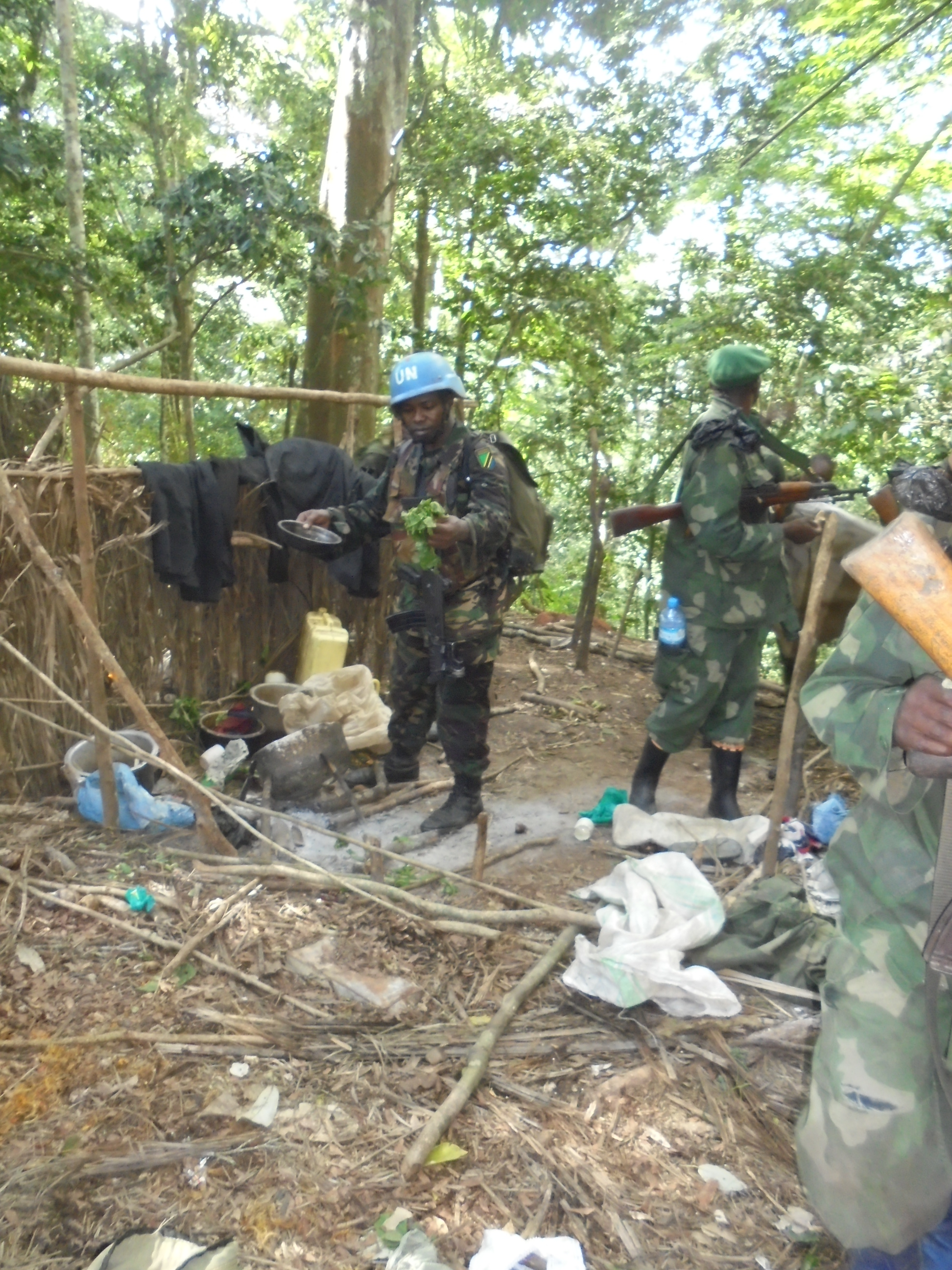
FARDC and MONUSCO's Tanzanian Special Forces search a former Alliance of Democratic Forces (ADF) position recaptured during Operation "Usalama" in southeastern Eringeti, Beni Territory.

In retaliation for Mayi-Mayi ambushes, UPDF forces launched indiscriminate attacks on villages suspected of harboring Mayi-Mayi fighters. These operations frequently involved mass civilian killings, destruction of property, and other acts of brutality. On 1 November 2000, UPDF soldiers reportedly executed between 7 and 11 civilians in Maboya and Loya, 16 kilometers north of Butembo, while setting ablaze 43 houses. Victims were either shot or burned alive. On 8 November 2000, close to the village of Butuhe, 10 kilometers north of Butembo, Vurondo Mayi-Mayi attacked a UPDF convoy escorting lorries transporting minerals. Similarly, on 9 November 2000, UPDF soldiers attacked the village of Kikere, close to Butuhe, killing 36 civilians with rifles and rocket launchers and systematically destroying homes and livestock. The UPDF's attack in Beni included arbitrary arrests, torture, and the execution of civilians. Detainees were often held in inhumane conditions, such as being confined in deep holes exposed to the elements. Protests against these abuses were met with lethal force, such as in March 2000, when UPDF soldiers killed four civilians during a demonstration in Beni.

==== Atrocities by ADF-NALU ====
The Allied Democratic Forces–National Army for the Liberation of Uganda (ADF-NALU), an armed group based in the Ruwenzori Mountains, also committed widespread atrocities in Beni. In 2000, ADF-NALU forces kidnapped, enslaved, and killed hundreds of civilians. In January, they abducted over 100 people in Mutwanga, and in April, they attacked surrounding villages, forcibly recruiting children and enslaving women. Many victims endured malnutrition, physical abuse, and execution during captivity, with some forced to carry looted property over long distances.

==== Escalation of violence against ethnic groups ====
In November 2002, RCD-Goma launched an assault on Bushimoo village in the Bashali-Mokoto groupement, and killed an unverified number of people from the Hunde ethnic group. During the same period, Mayi-Mayi forces under Hunde's leadership retaliated by torching multiple Nyanga villages in the same region, resulting in further casualties and displacement. The cycle of violence intensified in January 2003, as RCD-Goma forces conducted coordinated attacks on the villages of Bushimoo, Kauli, and Binyungunyungu. Over three days (21–23 January), RCD-Goma troops indiscriminately killed civilians, set villages ablaze, and committed acts of sexual violence. A particularly egregious attack occurred on 22 January when approximately 15 civilians were executed on a bridge over the Osso River. On 25 February 2003, RCD-Goma forces orchestrated a massacre in Bushimoo and Kailenge, killing at least 44 civilians. The attack was deceitfully executed under the guise of a community meeting meant to introduce a new village leader, an ex-Mayi-Mayi who had defected to RCD-Goma. The atrocities extended into Walikale Territory, and in April 2003, RCD-Goma forces killed five civilians and tortured two women near Kabusa, approximately ten kilometers from Walikale Territory. In June 2003, seven inhabitants of Lukweti were executed with bayonets, and their village was systematically looted.

The indigenous Twa communities in North Kivu suffered disproportionately during this period. Accused of collaborating with various armed factions, the Twa people were subjected to repeated attacks by RCD-Goma soldiers and FDLR. Crimes against the Twa people included rape, arbitrary detention, and other inhumane acts rooted in both ethnic prejudice and superstitious beliefs. In March 2003, RCD-Goma forces gang-raped numerous Twa women in Mubambiro, near the Virunga National Park, an atrocity echoed in September 2003 in the nearby village of Mudja. Both incidents were marked by degrading treatment and indiscriminate abuse.

==== Beni and Lubero areas ====
In 2001, the Beni and Lubero territories became entrenched battlegrounds as various factions, including RCD-ML, Mayi-Mayi groups, UPDF, and elements of the FDLR, fought for territorial control. The conflicts were characterized by widespread violence against civilians, including extrajudicial killings, sexual violence, and systemic looting. Under the RCD-ML's control, its armed wing, the Armée Populaire Congolaise (APC), was implicated in atrocities targeting civilian populations. In Kiantsaba, a village near Beni, APC forces killed at least five civilians and razed homes. Meanwhile, APC troops, in coordination with the UPDF, clashed with Mayi-Mayi militias in the village of Irango. During these confrontations, the UPDF reportedly committed mass killings, sexual violence against young girls, and extensive property destruction, including arson and looting. The UPDF's presence in Beni extended beyond military confrontations. For several years, Ugandan forces established a brutal regime, characterized by arbitrary detention, torture, and summary executions. Civilians were often confined in inhumane conditions, including detention in muddy pits several meters deep. North of Kanyabayonga, the FDLR targeted civilians across several villages, including Kayna, Mayene, Nyamindo, Kisandja, and Kiteka. The attacks often involved killings, harassment, and forced displacement.

=== Conflict-driven mineral exploitation ===
During the Second Congo War, military control over natural resources, particularly coltan, became a lucrative enterprise for the Rwandan-backed rebel group RCD-Goma. Although a decline in coltan prices led to a reduction in direct Rwandan army management of certain mining sites, their vested interest in the coltan trade remained high, with RCD-Goma and other political entities actively participating. RCD-Goma facilitated substantial revenue flows from coltan; however, even greater profits were channeled to Rwanda, as military officials and Rwandan authorities diverted significant quantities of coltan across the border.

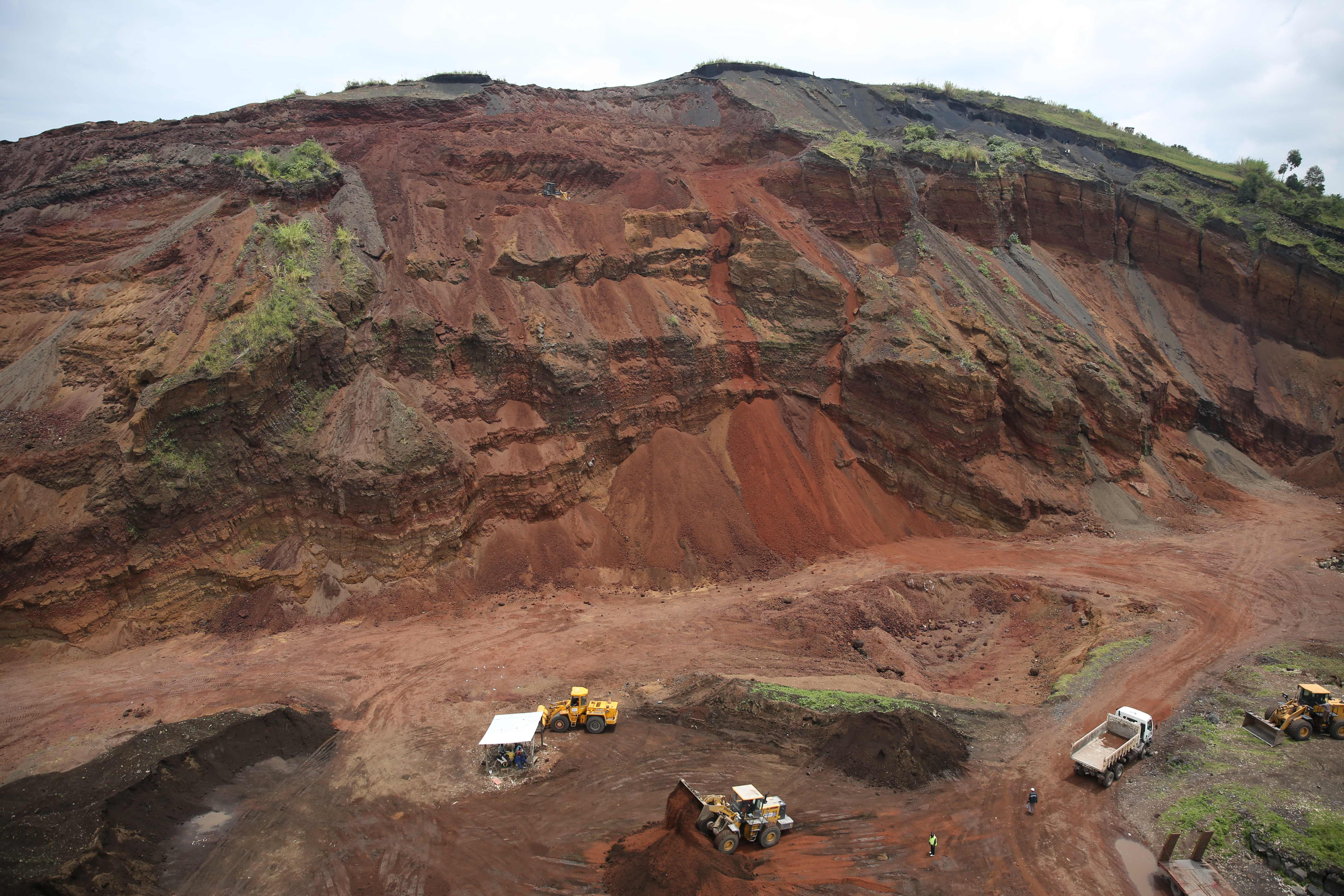
Quarry nearby Goma

From January to October 2000, coltan exports from Rwandan-controlled eastern Democratic Republic of the Congo exceeded 445 tonnes, according to RCD-Goma's records. In late 2000, the organization implemented an export monopoly and declared 208 tonnes of coltan exports over the next two months. Accounting for both formal and clandestine transfers to Rwanda, annual production in the Kivu provinces likely reached between 1,400 and 1,700 tonnes in 2000. Estimates suggested that more than $60 million was directed to local trading houses (comptoirs) during the peak months of the trade, while the Rwandan army reportedly accrued upwards of $250 million over an 18-month period from coltan exported to Rwanda. These profits largely benefitted Rwandan and RCD-Goma military elites, business figures, and other individuals with ties to the Rwandan government.

The Rwandan army's extraction and transfer operations were organized and controlled by senior commanders stationed in key territories such as Walikale and Masisi. Checkpoints were established to monitor and restrict civilian access to mining areas, while major towns and airstrips became stockpiling sites for coltan awaiting air or road transport. To facilitate these operations, new airstrips were built, and military helicopters, along with contracted companies such as Swala Express, Bukavu Air Transport, and Kivu-Air, transported coltan from remote mining zones directly to Rwanda, where state-operated facilities were used to store the mineral. Return flights often carried arms and equipment back into the DRC. Civilian flights, which previously allowed local miners to sell coltan to local trading houses, were halted by military authorities to consolidate control over the trade.

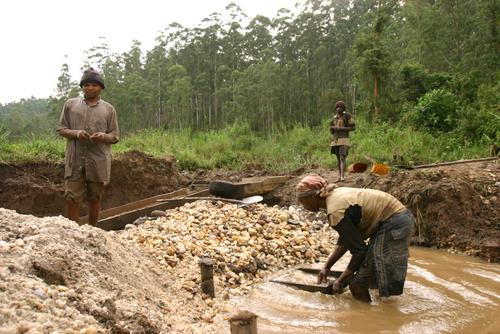
Artisanal diamond miners near Lubero

Civilians in military-controlled mining areas were frequently coerced into forced labor, and even paid miners had to sell their output to army officials at considerably reduced rates. Additionally, Rwandan soldiers served as private security for foreign-owned mining concessions, receiving a share of profits in exchange for their protection. Although some coltan passed through local trading houses, the majority was flown directly to Rwanda, bypassing the DRC's export system.

Rwandan military officers and entrepreneurs linked to the government were prominently represented as directors and stakeholders in key trading houses in Goma and Bukavu, such as Grands Lacs Metals and Rwanda Metals. These trading houses collaborated with the Rwandan government's Congo Desk, facilitating the direct export of coltan to international markets. Despite the eventual downturn in coltan prices, military transfers persisted, as illustrated by October 5, 2002, seizure of 36 tonnes of coltan belonging to Rwanda Metals in Tanzania. The DRC government accused Rwanda Metals of looting resources from the DRC, though the company contested the claim, asserting the coltan was mined domestically. Although the Tanzanian High Court dismissed the case, the provenance of the seized coltan remains uncertain.

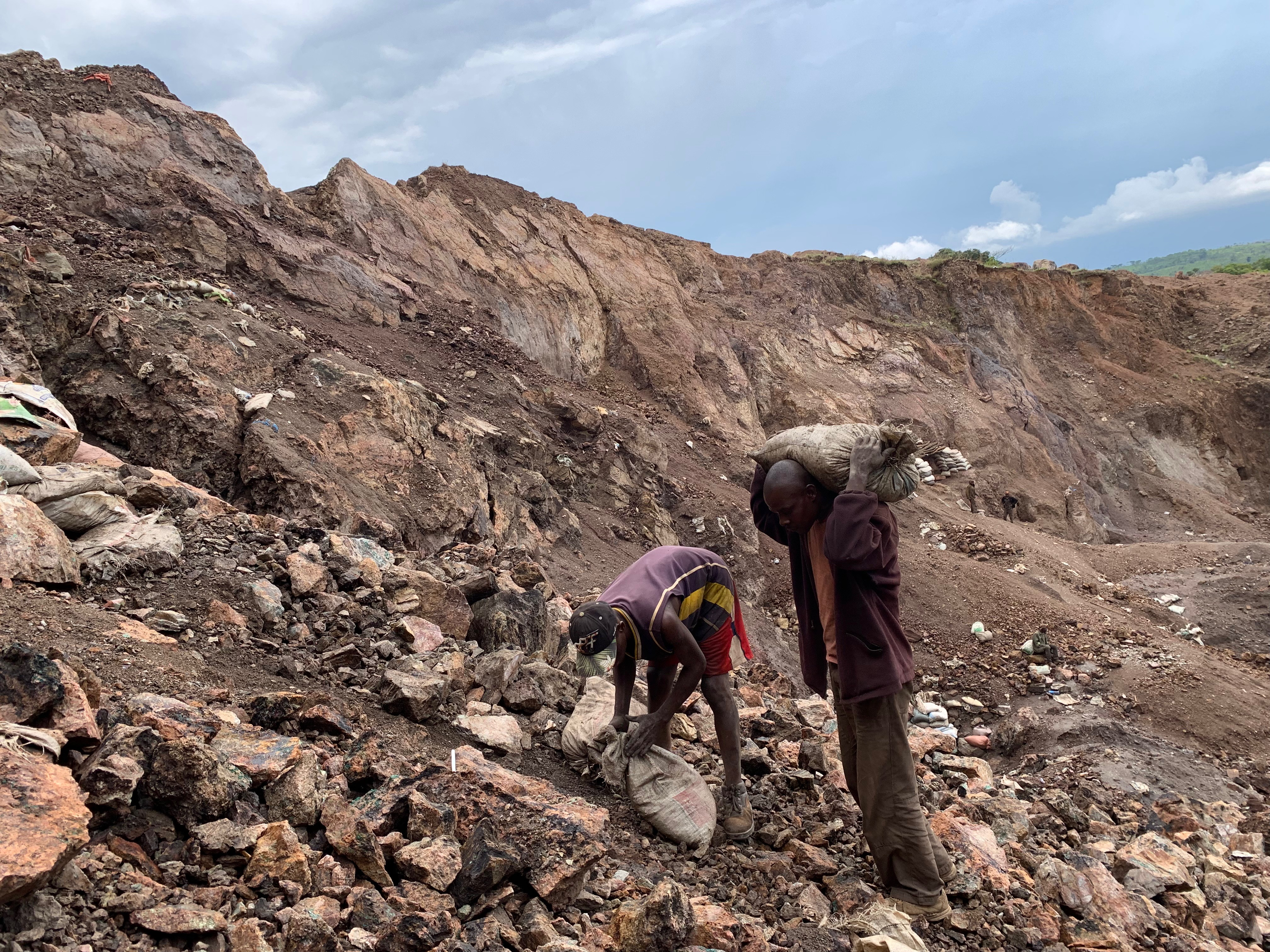
Artisanal cobalt miners

RCD-Goma, despite its self-appointed administrative authority, lacked the logistical and military resources necessary for extensive control over mining areas, as exercised by the Rwandan army. Nevertheless, it capitalized on the coltan trade by imposing numerous taxes and fees, including mining license charges, non-refundable deposits, export taxes, and a "war effort tax", which escalated alongside coltan prices. RCD-Goma also held a controlling 75% interest in the Société Minière des Grands Lacs (SOMIGL), which held a temporary monopoly on coltan exports, generating immediate revenue surges. In December 2000, the 112 tonnes of exported coltan brought in over $1.1 million in taxes; however, none of these funds were allocated toward public services like healthcare or education.

The monopoly was dissolved in April 2001 due to the Rwandan army's disregard for RCD-Goma's control, withholding of stocks by trading houses, and a decline in tantalum prices. Letters from RCD-Goma officials expressed concern over revenue losses due to direct coltan exports to Rwanda by Rwandan forces. Monthly exports, estimated at 46 tonnes and valued at up to $21 million on the global market. RCD-Goma also capitalized on its authority by selling coltan concessions, even those under the legal ownership of the Canadian-based gold exploration and development company Banro Corp or the DRC government. In February 2001, an RCD-Goma committee awarded Medival Minerals Ltd., a Swiss company, an 18-month contract for cassiterite extraction in various concessions. In eastern DRC, coltan is often mislabeled as cassiterite to circumvent higher tantalum-related duties. Under this arrangement, the committee received 20% of the sale price, with RCD-Goma providing security.

==== Mass killings, civilian attacks, and forced labor ====
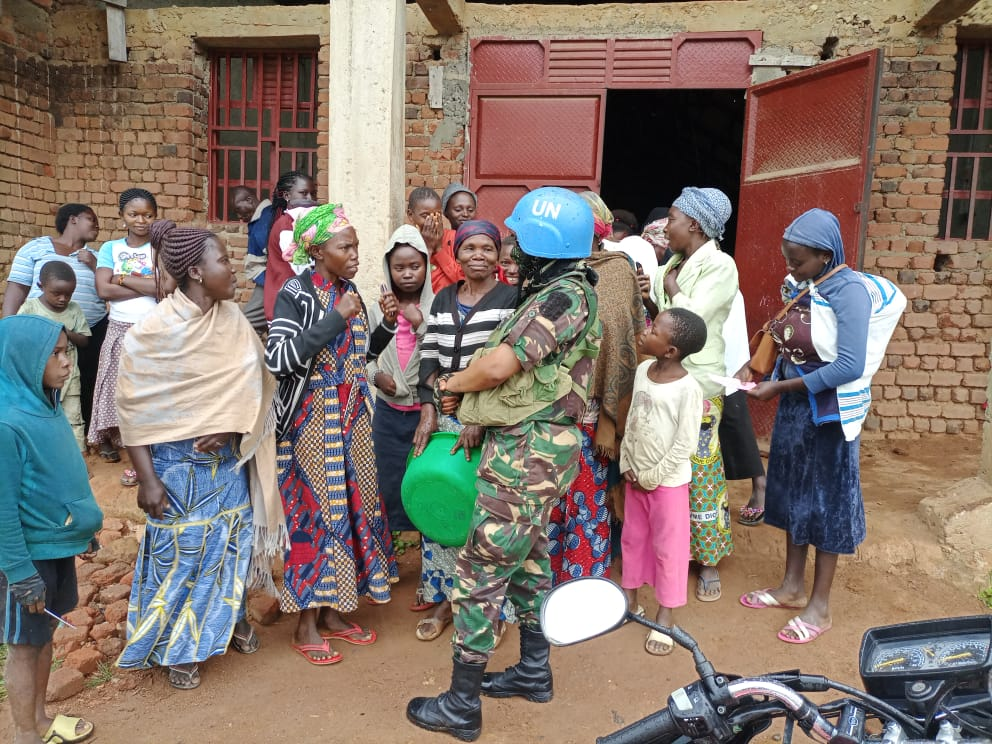
The Tanzanian Battalion of MONUSCO's Force Intervention Brigade escorts the Mission's civilian personnel as they engage with local communities to foster cooperation to help protect civilians from armed group attacks.

Civilians residing in coltan-rich areas such as Punia, Kindu, Shabunda, Masisi, and Walikale suffered from frequent attacks. These incidents involved both targeted killings and indiscriminate violence against entire communities. Villages were razed, and large areas were depopulated as residents fled to escape the brutality. For example, in early May 2001, residents of Kabale, in Masisi Territory, were forced to flee into the forest due to clashes between the Rwandese army and the Mayi-Mayi militia. When some villagers attempted to return, Rwandan soldiers opened fire, killing multiple civilians, including a young family and an infant.

The demand for coltan also led to the systematic use of forced labor, often involving children. Reports indicate that in April 2001, Rwandan soldiers forced children and adults to work in mining operations in Masisi Territory. Mining sites at Mumba and Rugeshe in the Lwundje groupement of the Osso Sector in Masisi Territory became scenes of forced labor, with soldiers using violence to compel local populations to work.

In one notable case, a Congolese human rights activist who went to investigate labor practices at a coltan mine was detained and forced to work alongside other civilians. He later recounted that up to 200 civilians, including a large number of children, were being made to work under harsh conditions, often threatened with bayonets and rifle butts.

==== Displacement and specific incidents of targeted Killings ====
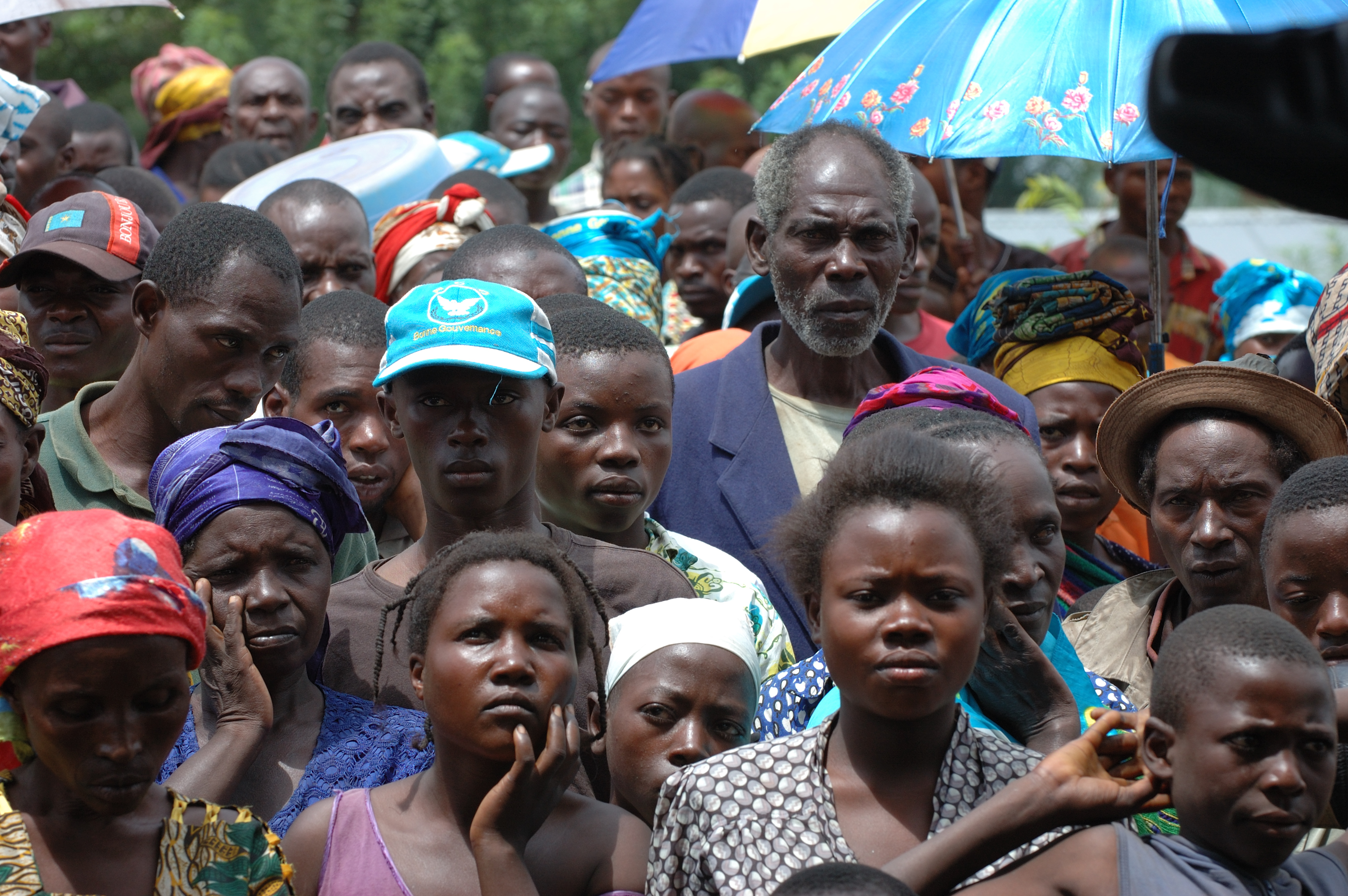
Internally displaced persons (IDPs) at the Kiwanja camp in Rutshuru Territory

The conflict over coltan resources also led to widespread displacement, as forces destroyed villages and expelled residents from their homes. Between April and October 2001, thousands of people were forcibly displaced in the Osso Sector around Mahanga when RCD-Goma and Rwandan forces sought control of mining areas. The displaced faced extreme hardships, with inadequate access to food, shelter, and sanitation, resulting in additional deaths due to disease and starvation. In some cases, residents were gathered in inadequate shelters, such as a school in Mahanga, where they were left without humanitarian aid. Many of the displaced perished.

Several targeted killings occurred throughout the conflict, often motivated by accusations of collaboration with opposition forces or mere association with the coltan trade. On 25 May 2001, Saasita Babaoni, a Congolese employee at a coltan comptoir in Masisi, was killed in his office by a Rwandan soldier. Despite prior threats and complaints, Rwandan authorities failed to act, and the perpetrator faced no accountability.

Another significant incident occurred on 28 August 2001, when Rwandan soldiers detained a trader near Punia, forcing him to transport an RCD-Goma combatant and subsequently detaining him in a cachot souterrain, a pit used as a makeshift prison. That night, the trader witnessed the soldiers execute six other detainees, accused of collaborating with the Mayi-Mayi.

==== Impact on women, children, and vulnerable populations ====
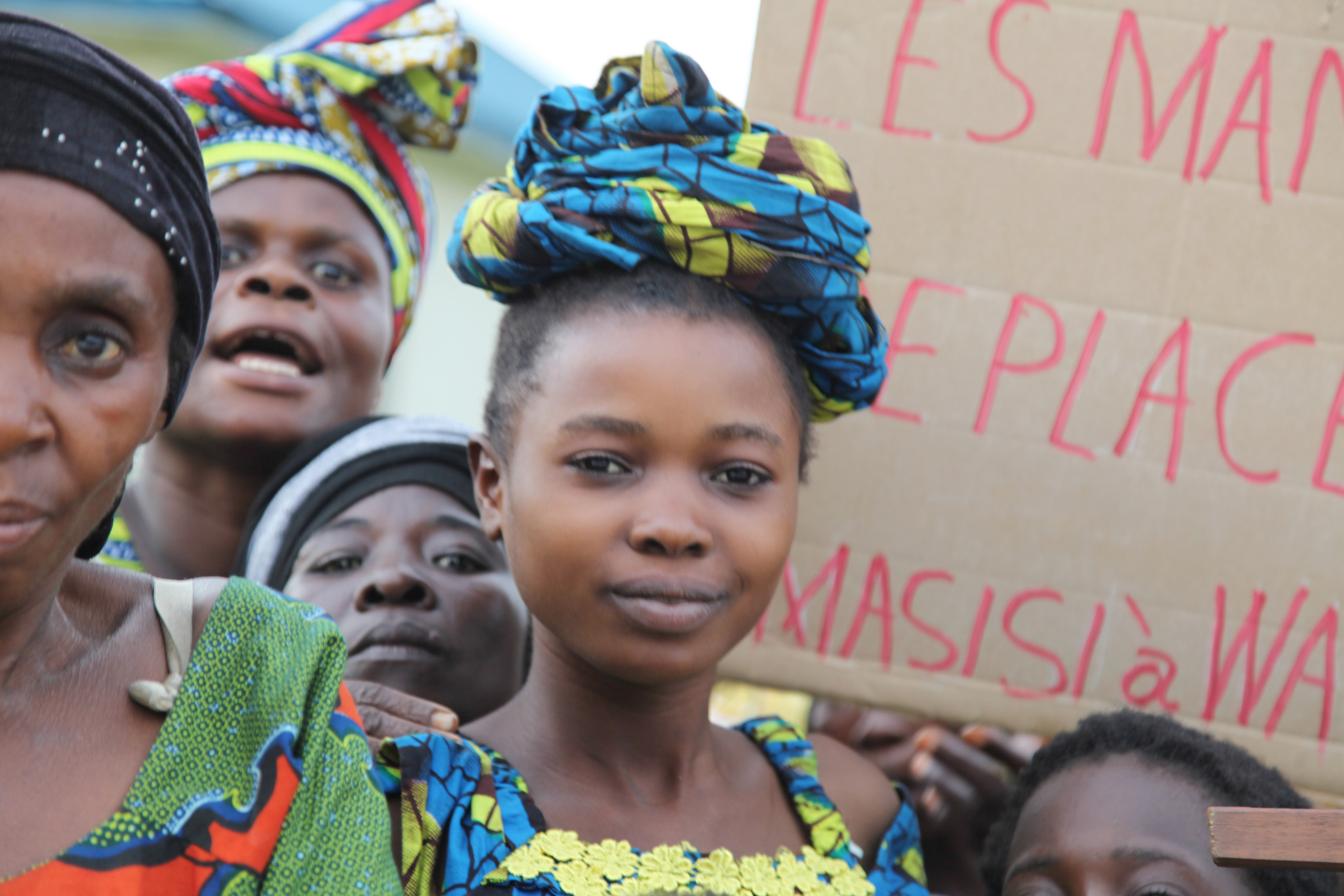
Women and young girl in Walikale

The violence and forced labor associated with coltan mining disproportionately affected women, children, and other vulnerable populations. Many children were conscripted into labor in dangerous mining conditions, with frequent use of physical violence to enforce compliance. Women and the elderly, often unable to flee quickly, became victims of targeted violence, as illustrated by the murders near Bongbenyama and Fakiri, where 20 elderly villagers, women, and children were killed during raids.

=== Ongoing conflict ===
On 19 August 2003, DRC government decree 019/2003 offered Laurent Nkunda the rank of Brigadier General and command of the new Congo Government's FARDC Eighth Military Region, covering North Kivu. He declined. On 26 May 2004, General Obed Wibasira (RCD-Goma) was named to the position. But Wibasira was suspected of complicity with the soldiers in Goma who had triggered a mutiny in Bukavu in February 2004, and on 23 January 2005, he was switched with Gabriel Amisi Kumba, at the time commander of the Fifth Military Region in Kasaï-Oriental. Kumba was named as a Brigadier General when taking up the post. General Louis Ngizo, a former commander of the Rally for Congolese Democracy, was appointed a commander in November 2006. Brigadier General Vainqueur Mayala was transferred from command of the Ituri operational zone, promoted to Major General, and appointed military region commander in May 2007. Ngizo left Goma on 13 May 2007, his next posting not being known at the time. During late 2008, the FARDC maintained its dismal record in combat against Nkunda's CNDP faction, losing the Rumangabo military camp to the rebels.

The dissident Mai-Mai 85th Brigade, commanded by Colonel Samy Matumo, controlled the cassiterite mine at Bisie, just north of Manoire in Walikale, in southeastern North Kivu. The former RCD-K/ML also has fighters in the province; at the beginning of the transition [2002-3] the RCD-Mouvement de Libération president declared he had 8-10,000 Armée Patriotic Congolaise (APC) troops in the Beni-Lubero area of North Kivu.' This exaggerated figure seems to have been reduced to 'several thousand' (2-4,000?) as of early 2006, following demobilizations and men joining the integrated brigades.

In January 2025 a Portuguese Comboni missionary stationed in the DRC spoke to Catholic charity Aid to the Church in Need, blaming M23 for a series of attacks on civilians around Christmas of 2024. He accused Rwanda directly of instigating the violence. "The problem does not lie with the people, but with Rwanda, which continues to want to massacre the Congolese population, to take control of the land and steal the rich natural resources".

The Effacer le tableau and Beni massacre occurred in the province, which, as reported by Actualite.cd in July 2025, has increasingly become entangled in the transnational network of the Islamic State (IS) in Africa. Among those sanctioned by the United States Department of the Treasury was Hamidah Nabagala, a DRC-based facilitator accused of enabling financial transactions in support of IS operations in Central Africa. Her alleged activities included the funding of violent extremist acts, notably the 2021 Kampala bombing, and attempts to enroll her children in IS-affiliated training camps within the DRC. The Islamic State Central Africa Province (ISCAP), which incorporates the ADF, remains highly active in these areas. The group's operations within the DRC pose serious threats and fuel continued violence in North Kivu and Ituri.

On 8 and 9 September, the ADF carried out a massacre of at least 64 people in Ntoyo, who were attending a wake. The attackers used firearms and tools to kill civilians and then set houses on fire.

== Economy ==
=== Agriculture ===
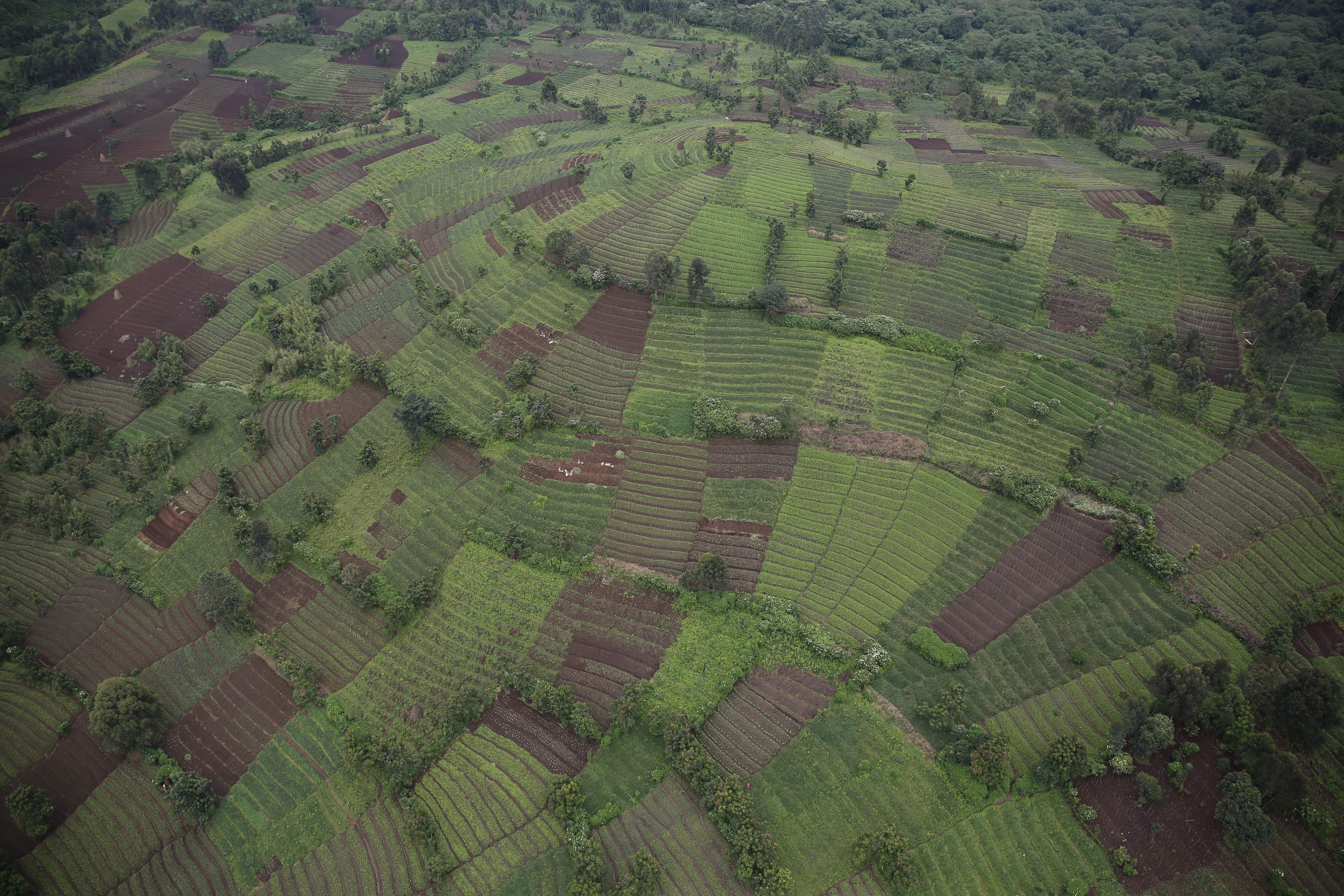
A patchwork of agricultural fields spread across North Kivu's landscape.

Subsistence agriculture is North Kivu's most significant economic activity, employing over 90% of its population. Key food crops include cassava, maize, plantains, sweet potatoes, peanuts, yams, soybeans, paddy rice, cowpeas, and wheat, while industrial crops such as oil palm, rubber, tea, quinine, coffee, coconut, pyrethrum, papaya, and cocoa also thrive. North Kivu ranks among the leading producers of premium-grade papaya worldwide and, along with South Kivu, is one of the only provinces producing tea in the Democratic Republic of the Congo.

Livestock production operates through two main systems. The first is traditional or nomadic herding, practiced by small-scale pastoralists who may or may not own small plots of land and who keep modest herds of resilient Ankole cattle, a breed known for its resistance to disease. The second system is modern livestock farming, which involves large-scale operations with herds exceeding 200 cattle. These farms use artificial insemination to improve productivity or crossbreed local Ankole cattle with imported, high-yielding breeds.

Animals raised in the province include cattle, goats, sheep, pigs, poultry, rabbits, and guinea pigs. Before the First Congo War and Second Congo War, North Kivu was a major supplier of animal protein for the entire Democratic Republic of the Congo. However, armed conflicts led to widespread looting and indiscriminate slaughter, which resulted in a sharp decline in livestock numbers.

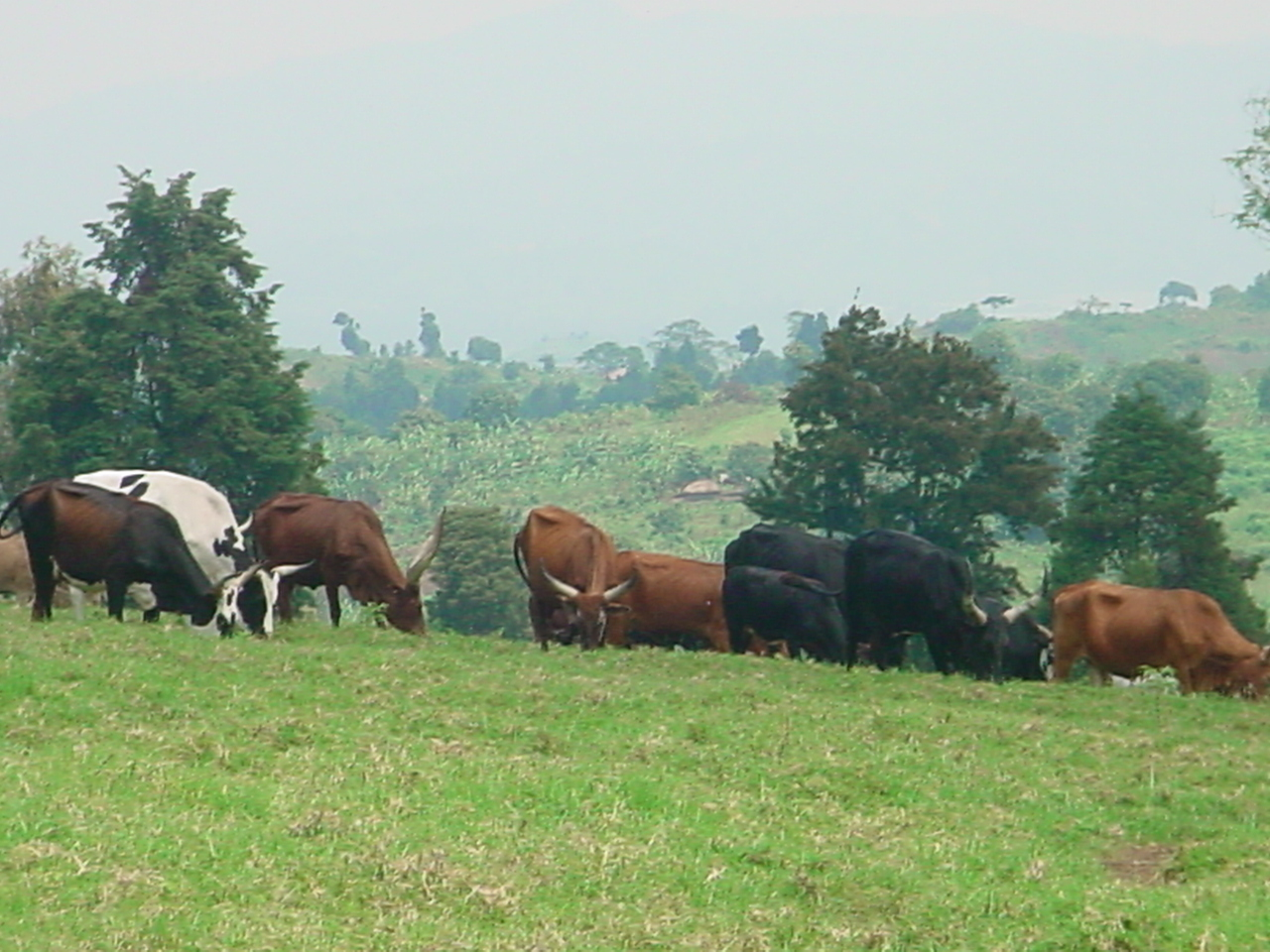
A farm in the Masisi Territory

After a mission conducted in late June and early July 2006 to Goma, Butembo, and Beni, Jérôme Roux and Alain Huart recommended bringing a cheese-making specialist to evaluate the dairy sector and propose development strategies. They also emphasized the need to process agricultural products locally, particularly soybeans. In 2008, Bob Kambale Kighoma noted the absence of biscuit factories in the province, stating that soybeans were instead exported to Rwanda for processing. Efforts were also underway to introduce food-processing and preservation technologies to improve the marketing of perishable goods in major consumption hubs.

ACOGENOKI (Association coopérative des groupements d'éleveurs du Nord-Kivu), a cooperative association of livestock producers, has become a key player in the dairy industry by focusing on milk collection, processing, and commercialization. In early 2021, it received financial backing from the Fund for the Promotion of Industry (Fonds pour la promotion de l'industrie; FPI) under President Félix Tshisekedi's 100-Day Program (programme de 100 jours). Within three months, the cooperative successfully launched its first processed dairy products. ACOGENOKI operates a modular dairy-processing unit in Luhonga, Masisi Territory, where it manufactures various dairy products.

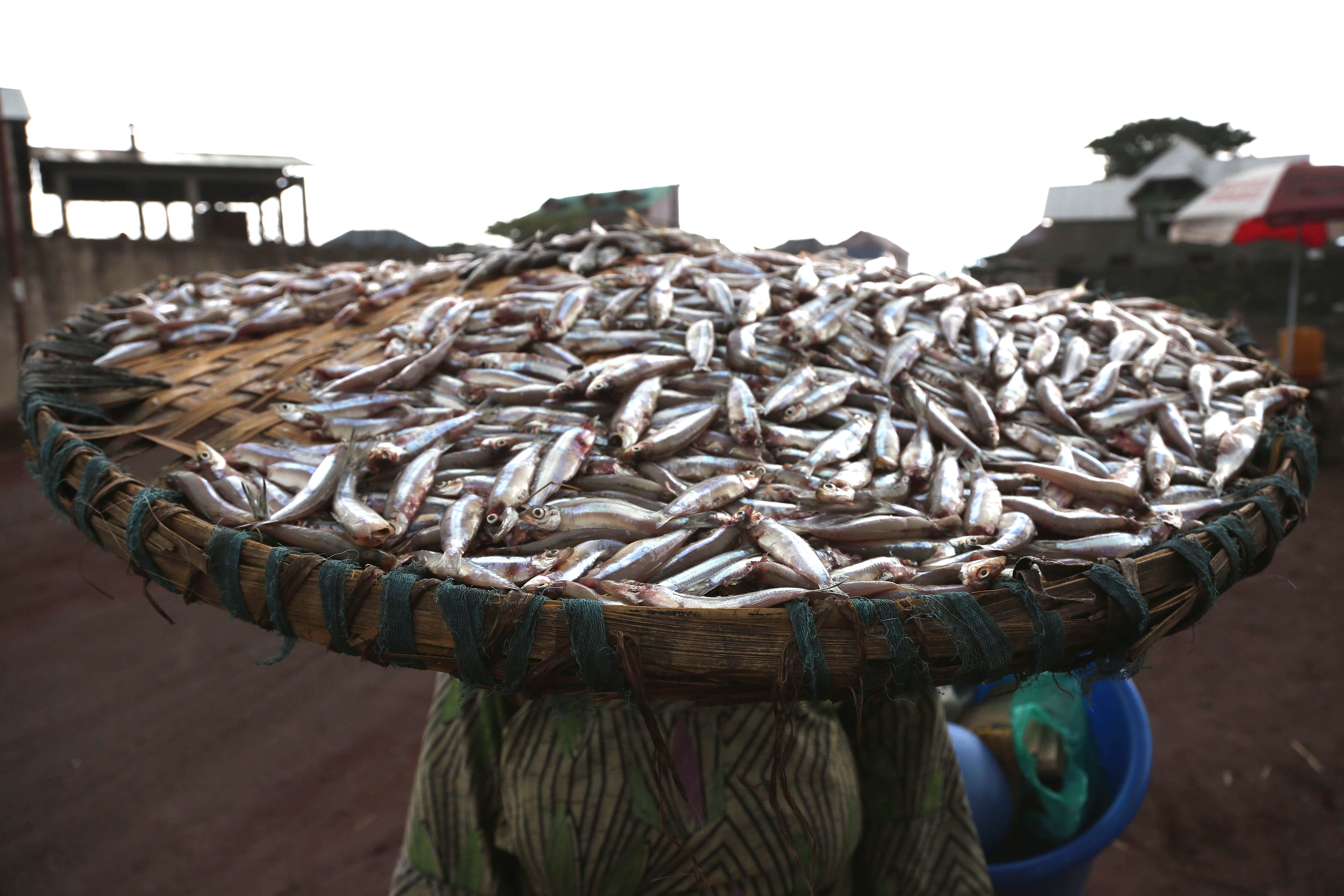
Goma's sambaza, which are traditionally fried and consumed in the region.

Fishing is supported by fish-filled rivers in Walikale and the western parts of Beni and Lubero territories. Rutshuru Territory is particularly important for fishing, with Vitshumbi, Kyavinyonge, and Nyakakoma standing out as major landing sites on Lake Edward. Fishing activities expanded beyond these areas in the early 1990s, originating from patrol posts. However, economic hardship, limited resources for the Institut Congolais pour la Conservation de la Nature (ICCN), and very low wages for Virunga National Park staff have weakened park rangers' enforcement, allowing ten organized illegal fishing sites to emerge around the park: Kasindi port, Muramba, Mosenda, Lunyasenge, Kamande Bay, Mahiha, Kisaka, Katundu, Talya, and Kamande, as well as a more scattered set of settlements, especially around Kamande Bay.

North Kivu's position along Lake Kivu favors artisanal fishing, which supplies the population with Tanganyika sardine, locally known as ndakala or sambaza. This species has adapted to the lake's gas conditions and serves as the primary fish resource for local consumption. In Vitshumbi, Nyakakoma, and Kyavinyonge, tilapia accounts for about 60 percent of fish stocks, while bagrus and clarias each represent roughly 10 percent, with other species making up the remaining 20 percent. In Lake Kivu, sambaza dominate the catch at around 90 percent, with other species accounting for only 10 percent. Lake Kivu is relatively poor in fish, producing an estimated 4,500 tonnes annually, whereas Lake Edward is far more productive, with an estimated yearly yield of 15,000 tonnes.

=== Mining ===
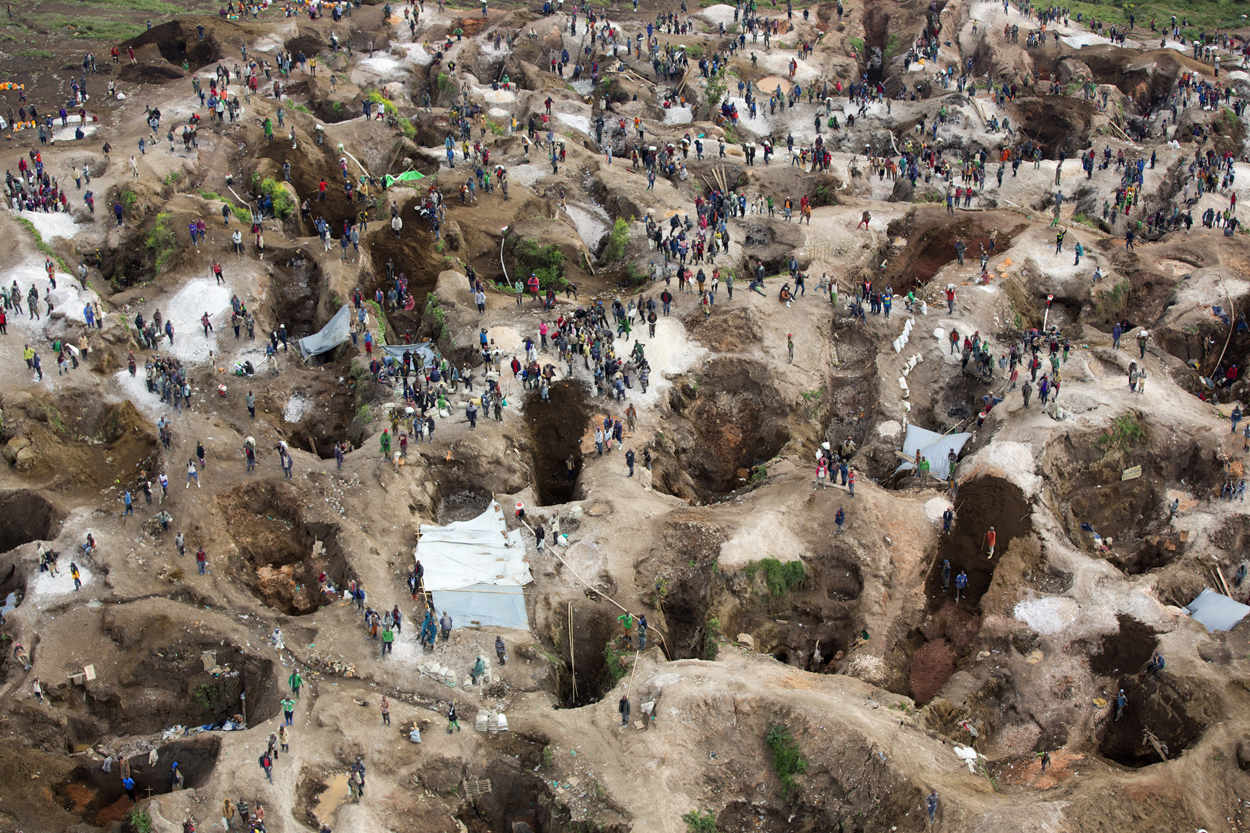
The Luwowo coltan mine near Rubaya in 2014

North Kivu is rich in mineral deposits. The province contains a variety of deposits, such as gold, silver, monazite, cassiterite, columbo-tantalite (coltan), wolframite (tungsten oxide), diamonds, pyrochlore, zirconium, quartz, tourmaline, platinum, and phosphate, spread across different territories.

Gold deposits are located in Beni, Lubero, Masisi, and Walikale, while silver is found in all territories except Nyiragongo. Rutshuru and Masisi contain cassiterite reserves, whereas coltan is mined in Lubero, Masisi, and Walikale. Pyrochlore, a mineral used in various industrial applications, is extracted from Beni and Rutshuru, with SOMIKIVU responsible for its extraction. Walikale Territory stands out as a major mining hub, known for the Bisie mine's cassiterite production.

==== Artisanal and semi-industrial mining practices ====
Artisanal mining, a labor-intensive and low-technology approach, dominates the sector, particularly in Lubero's sites like Manguredjipa, Bunyatenge, and Kasugho, as well as Beni's Cantine and Mabalako. In Walikale, artisanal mining prevails except for Bisie, which stands as a semi-industrialized operation. Managed by South African and Canadian firms MPC and Alpha Mine, the Bisie mine represents a shift towards more industrialized methods, focusing primarily on cassiterite extraction. The Masisi Territory, notable for coltan extraction, also engages in semi-industrial mining led by the Congolese company Société Minière de Bisunzu SARL (SMB).

Major companies	Activity	Headquarters or branch
Congo Tobacco Company (CTC)/Super match	Tobacco industry	Goma
ETS Bishweka Vanny	General trade	Goma
Maison M.L	Trade	Goma
Kivu Motor	Trade	Goma
ETS My Friend	Construction	Goma
PREMIDIS Sarl	Industry	Goma/Rutshuru
Alphamin Bisie Mining (ABM)	Mining company	Goma/Walikale
Société Minière de Bisunzu	Mining company	Goma/Masisi
Busy Bee Congo	Transport	Goma
My Friend	Transport	Goma
ESCO Kivu Sarl	Agriculture	Butembo
Maison Palos Sarl	Trade	Butembo
Mbiza Foam	Manufactures mattresses	Goma
Delta Mousse ("Groupe Industriel du Kivu")	Manufactures mattresses	Goma
Alpha-Shoes	Processes plastics for the production of sandals (babouches) and plastic items such as PVC products	Goma
MaizeKing	Farmer-owned company created in 1987 for processing and marketing cereals grown by local farmers	Goma
Société Nationale d'Électricité	Supplies electrical energy produced by the Ruzizi I Hydroelectric Power Station and Ruzizi II Hydroelectric Power Station in Bukavu	Goma
REGIDESO	Supplies drinking water	Goma
Carmel, Krishna, Qovadis, Pain Royal	Bakeries	Goma
Kivu Maji	Produces mineral water	Goma

=== Infrastructure ===
The province's economic infrastructure is a blend of essential services and transport networks that facilitate trade and daily operations. Air transport is anchored by Goma International Airport, alongside 22 additional airstrips owned by the state or private operators. Water transport is possible on Lakes Kivu and Edward and on several rivers, including the Rutshuru, Rwindi, Semliki, Osso, and Lowa. The road system extends over approximately 5,134 kilometers and includes national, provincial, and rural agricultural roads, but poor upkeep frequently disrupts connectivity. Recent efforts have led to the rehabilitation of major routes, particularly National Roads 2 and 3.

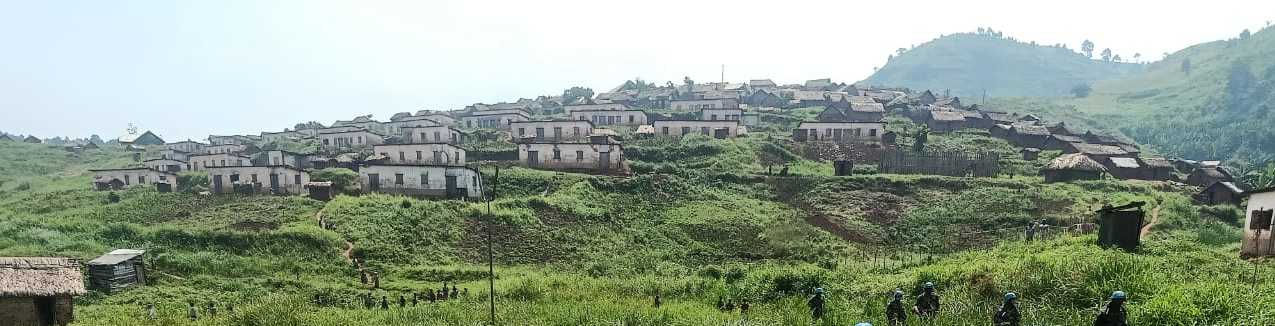
Miriki, located approximately 110 km north of Goma in North Kivu

Key state-owned enterprises (SOEs) like SNEL (Société Nationale d'Électricité) and REGIDESO provide electricity and water services, primarily to Goma, with limited supply extending to other urban centers. The port of Goma and its quays, operated partially by SNCC (Société Nationale des Chemins de fer du Congo), support riverine commerce, while private entities like Congo Maji SARL and Yme Jibu provide supplementary water services through standpipes and home connections.

=== Protected areas ===
North Kivu's protected areas includes lakes, national parks, and related conservation reserves, as well as animal species protected under Congolese law.

==== Virunga National Park ====
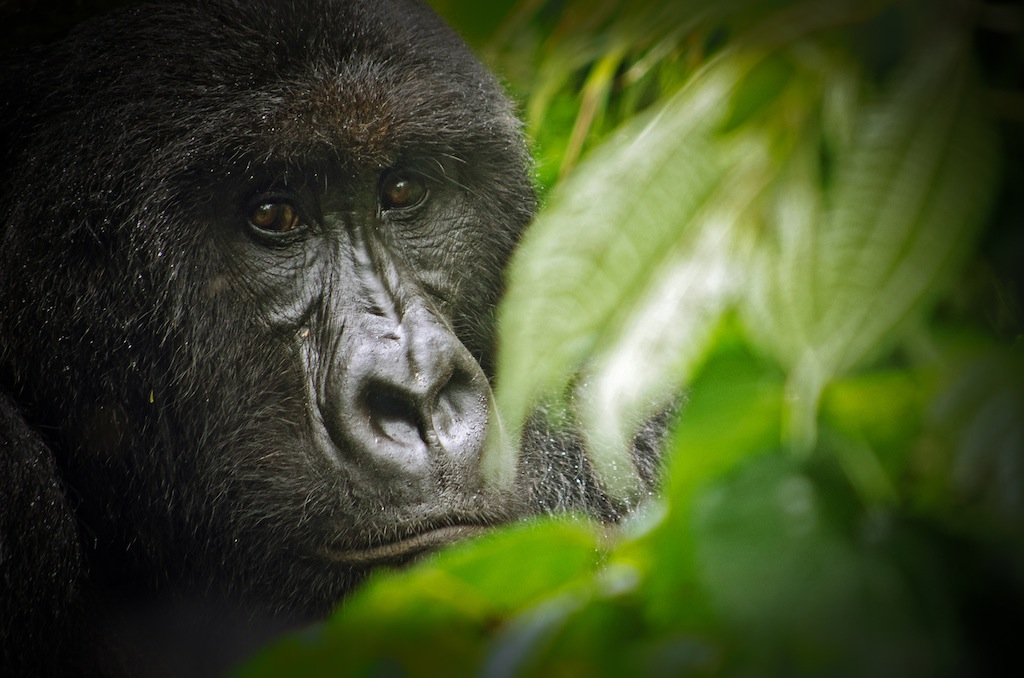
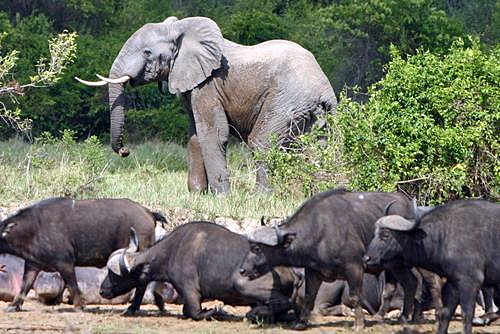
Virunga National Park

Created in 1925 during the colonial era, Virunga National Park is a UNESCO World Heritage Site situated on the equator in eastern Democratic Republic of the Congo, along the borders with Rwanda and Uganda. The park is internationally recognized for its endangered mountain gorillas and biodiversity. Its botanical richness stems from the wide variety of ecosystems and habitats it encompasses, as well as its strategic phytogeographical location.

Virunga is considered one of Africa's most important protected areas due to its diversity of flora and fauna and its high degree of endemism. It hosts 196 mammal species, including 21 endemic to the East African Rift; 706 bird species, 23 of which are endemic; 109 reptile species, including 11 endemic; 78 amphibian species, with 21 endemic; 21 endemic butterfly species; and 2,077 plant species, including 230 endemics.

Although initially created to protect mountain gorillas, the park also hosts other globally significant wildlife such as elephants, chimpanzees, and hippopotamuses. Virunga currently "constitutes an island of relatively untouched nature", almost entirely encircled by rapidly expanding human settlements, including Kiwanja, Rutshuru, Ishasha, and Nyamilima, as well as numerous fishing villages established within the park. Population density in surrounding areas exceeds 300 inhabitants per square kilometer, with some localities, such as Nyamilima, recording growth rates as high as 36.264% in 2002.

==== Lake Edward ====
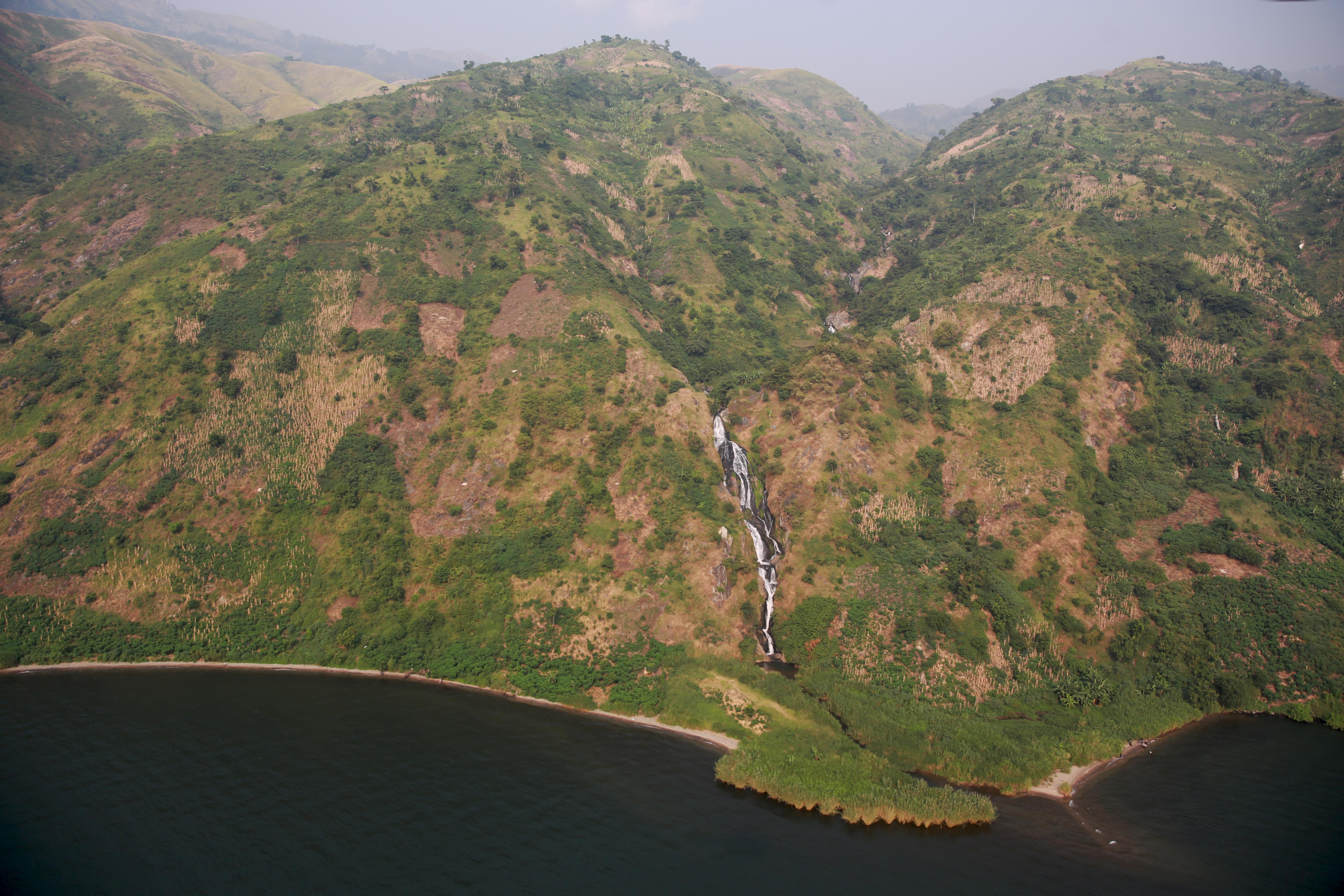
Hills around Lake Edward

Lake Edward is one of the African Great Lakes, located within the Great Rift Valley in North Kivu along the border between the Democratic Republic of the Congo and Uganda, with its northern shoreline lying just south of the Equator. It receives inflows from the Nyamugasani, Ishasha, Rutshuru, and Rwindi rivers and drains northward via the Semliki River into Lake Albert. The lake is also connected to Lake George through the Kazinga Channel.

Ranked fifteenth in size among African lakes, it constitutes a major ecological reserve, and hosts a wide range of fish species such as Bagrus docma, Sarotherodon niloticus, Sarotherodon leucostictus, Haplochromis spp., Hemihaplochromis multicolor, and Schutzia eduardiana. This diversity underpins the importance of fishing for local lakeside communities. Wildlife along the shores, including chimpanzees, elephants, crocodiles, and lions, is protected within Virunga National Park and Queen Elizabeth National Park in Uganda, while the lake area also supports numerous resident and migratory bird species.

==== Lake Kivu ====
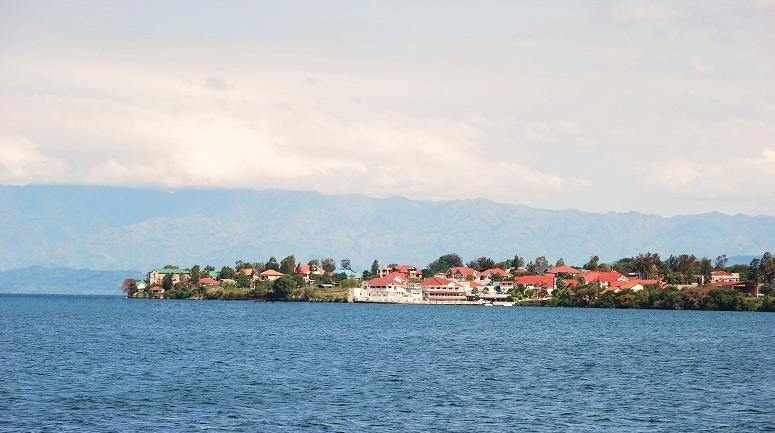
Lake Kivu with Goma in the background

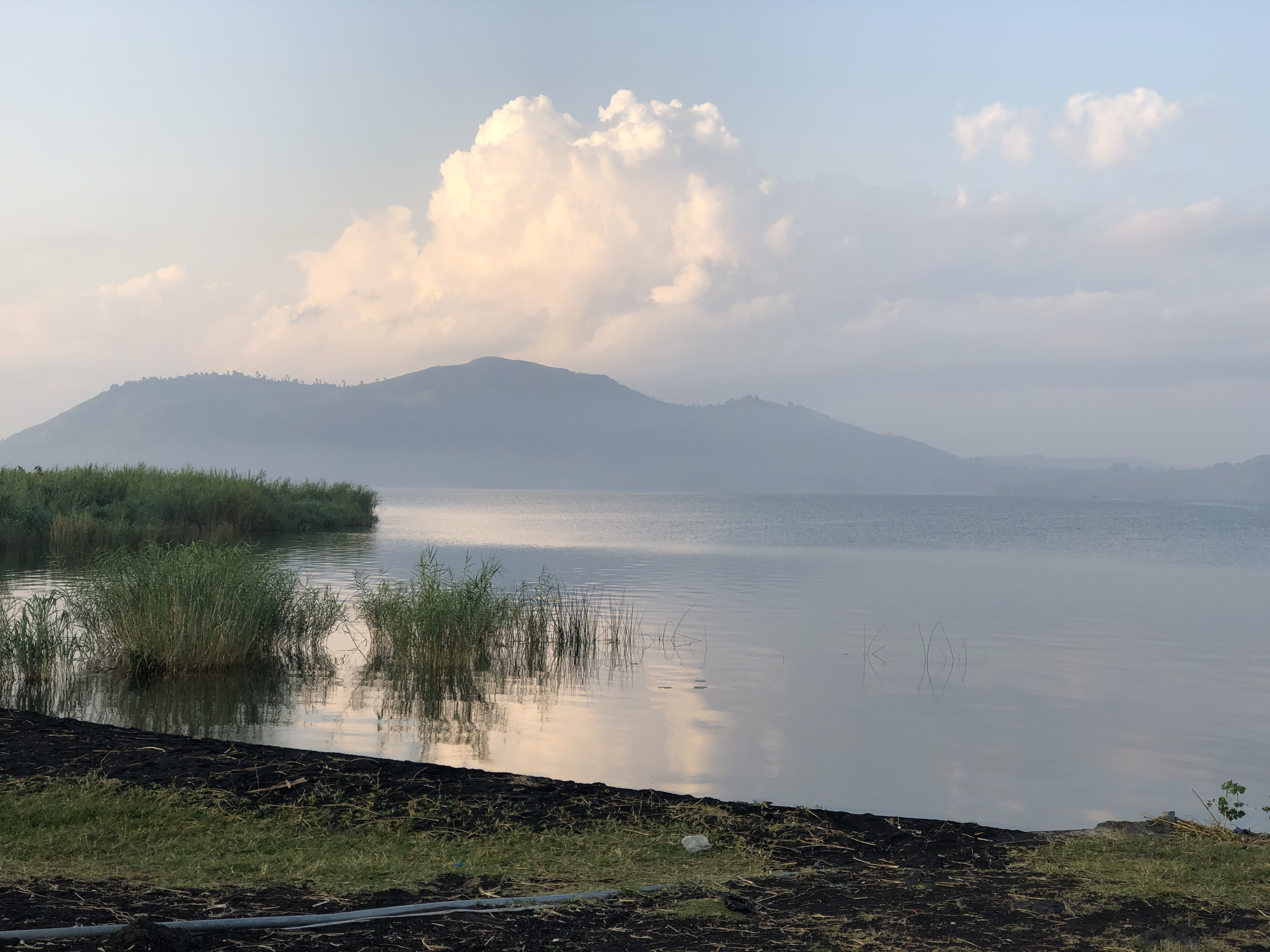
Lake Kivu from Sake

Lake Kivu is part of the African Great Lakes system and lies within the western branch of the East African Rift. It is among the world's largest and deepest lakes and supports a rich diversity of vertebrate, mainly fish, and invertebrate species such as mollusks and ostracods, many of which are endemic, and have attracted interest from scientists worldwide. The lake was first mentioned in 1864 by explorer John Hanning Speke, although it was first seen in 1895 by Gustav Adolf von Götzen.

Over recent decades, biologists and ecologists have conducted extensive research on Lake Kivu to evaluate its biological resources, sustainability, and mixolimnion ecosystem, building on studies initiated in the 1980s following the development of the sardine fishery. The sardine Limnothrissa miodon, originally endemic to Lake Tanganyika, was introduced in the mid-1950s to boost fish production in a pelagic zone rich in plankton but lacking planktivorous fish. This introduction is widely regarded as successful and continues to be cited as a positive example of species introduction that improved the livelihoods of local populations.

==== Related conservation reserves ====
Related conservation reserves are regulated areas designated for the protection of flora and fauna and include:

- the Tayna Gorilla Reserve (Réserves de gorilles de tayna; RGT), created in 1998 in Lubero Territory within the Batangi-Mbau groupement and Bamate Chiefdom;
- the Bakumbule Community Primate Reserve (Réserves communautaires des primates de Bakumbule; RECOPRIBA), created in 2001 and located in Walikale Territory within the Kisimba and Ikobo groupements;
- the Community Conservation of the Bakano Forest Reserve (Conservation communautaire de la réserve forestier de Bakano; COCREFOBA), created in 2002 in Walikale Territory, within the Utunda and Wasa groupements;
- the Usala Gorilla Reserve (Réserves des Gorilles d'Usala; RGU), created in 2002 in Walikale Territory, within the Usala groupement;
- the Lowa Forest Community Primate Reserve (Réserve communautaire de primates de la forêt de Lowa; RECOPRIFOL), created in 2004 in Walikale Territory, within the Walowa Uroba, Walowa Luanda, and Walowa Yungu groupements.

== Government and politics ==
=== Provincial government ===
North Kivu is administered by a provincial government led by a governor and supported by a vice-governor, both chosen by the Provincial Assembly. The governor appoints ten provincial ministries, including those responsible for territorial administration, security and justice, agriculture, development, and the environment. Goma serves as the provincial capital and, along with Beni and Butembo, is one of the three cities in North Kivu. Beyond the urban centers, North Kivu is organized into six territories: Beni, Rutshuru, Lubero, Masisi, Walikale, and Nyiragongo, which are then subdivided into ten chiefdoms, 97 groupements, and 5,178 villages. Key policies, such as the provincial civil service edit and Order No. 01/012/CAB/GP-NK/2009, regulate local and provincial governance structures.

Judicial governance is supported by the Groupe Thématique Justice et Droits Humains (GTJDH), which brings together civil and military justice systems. The Provincial Justice Division oversees penitentiary institutions, notarial services, and the supervision of State Guard and State Education (Garde et de l'Éducation de l'État) institutions. Judicial institutions operate through the Goma Court of Appeal, public prosecutor's offices, High Courts, Peace and Commercial Courts, as well as military courts.

=== Economic and financial ===
Significant reforms have been introduced to strengthen economic governance, particularly in fiscal management and revenue collection. A steering committee guides public finance reforms, supported by institutions such as the Budget Directorate and the General Directorate for Public Procurement Control (Direction Générale du Contrôle des Marchés Publics, DPCMP). Provincial tax collection is regulated by laws including Edit No. 002/2013, and the establishment of a taxpayer directory has helped improve revenue collection.

Public finances are managed through decentralized structures, with national agencies including DGDA (Direction Générale des Douanes et Accises), DGI (Direction Générale des Impôts), and DGRAD (Direction Générale des Recettes Administratives, Judiciaires, Domaniales et de Participations) collecting revenues for the central government, while the Provincial Directorate of Revenue of North Kivu (Direction Générale des Recettes de Nord-Kivu) handles local income.

Economic and social development activities are coordinated by the Planning Division, which collaborates with partners such as UNICEF on water, sanitation, and hygiene programs. The central government is also represented through provincial branches of several state-owned enterprises, including SNEL, REGIDESO, SONAS, SNCC, FPI, RVA, LAC, OCC, SONAHYDROC, OR, DVDA, and others.

=== Security and election ===
Provincial security is managed by local security forces. The Independent National Electoral Commission (CENI) maintains offices in major urban centers such as Goma, Beni, and Butembo, as well as in all six territories. Based in Goma, the Provincial Executive Secretariat coordinates electoral activities across the province, and facilitating the conduct of direct and indirect elections.

== Demographics ==
North Kivu had an estimated population of 8,985,711 in 2020. In 2012, the province's population was nearly 4.5 million, up from approximately 2.4 million twenty years earlier, accounting for about 8% of the Democratic Republic of the Congo's total population at the time. The population is predominantly young, with 79.2% of residents in younger age groups, and only slightly urbanized at 20.8%. The province's urban population represents only 5.5% of the DRC's urban population.

=== Ethnic groups ===
Ethnically, North Kivu is highly diverse, with populations drawn mainly from Bantu, Nilotic, and Pygmy groups. The Bantu constitute the dominant ethnolinguistic group. The province is home to several major ethnic groups, including the Nande, Mbuba, Hunde, Lese, Talinga, Mbuba, Pere, Tembo, Nyanga, Kano, Kusu, Kumu, Hutu, Tutsi, and Batwa.

The Hunde are primarily found in Masisi Territory, the Hutu in Rutshuru Territory, the Nande in Lubero Territory and Beni Territory, the Kumu in Nyiragongo Territory, the Tutsi in Masisi Territory and Rutshuru Territory, the Nyanga in Walikale Territory and Masisi Territory, the Tembo in Walikale Territory and Masisi Territory, and the Kano mainly in Walikale Territory.

Religiously, the province is home to adherents of Catholicism, Protestantism, Islam, Adventism, Jehovah's Witnesses, the Bahá’í Faith, and numerous other religious movements.

== Human rights issues ==
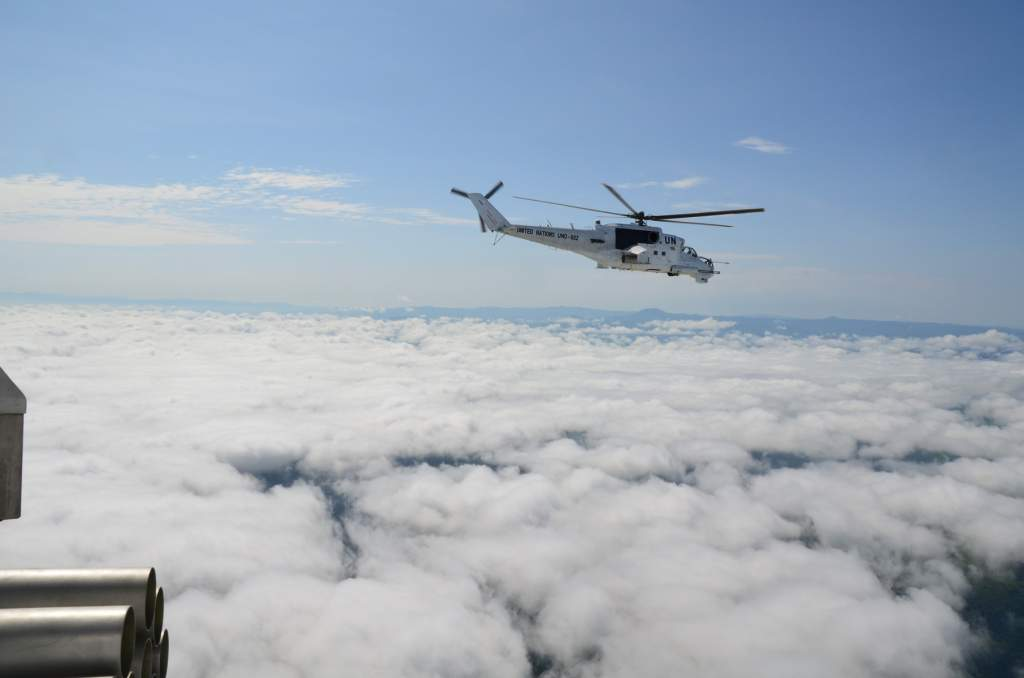
A UN Mi-24 flight reconnaissance in North Kivu.

In October 2007, the United Nations High Commissioner for Refugees (UNHCR) warned of an increasing number of internally displaced people (IDP) in North Kivu related to the fighting there between the government army, the Democratic Forces for the Liberation of Rwanda (FDLR) rebels and renegade troops, including Laurent Nkunda's forces, and a buildup of military supplies and forces, including recruitment of child soldiers by armed groups across North Kivu. The UNHCR thought that there were over 370,000 people in North Kivu displaced since December 2006, and is expanding its camps in the Mugunga area, where over 80,000 IDPs were estimated. The brief capture of Goma by M23 rebels caused "tens of thousands" of refugees. The town of Sake was abandoned.

== Sources ==
- Lederer, André (1993), "Incident de frontière au Kivu", Civilisations (in French), 41 (41): 415–426, doi:10.4000/civilisations.1730
- Lemarchand, René (1964), Political Awakening in the Belgian Congo, University of California Press, GGKEY:TQ2J84FWCXN
- Rutanga, Murindwa (2011), Politics, Religion, and Power in the Great Lakes Region, African Books Collective, ISBN 978-2-86978-492-5
