= Nord-Kivu District =

Nord-Kivu
- District
- Coordinates: 0.566667°S 28.7°E
- Country: Democratic Republic of the Congo
- Province: Kivu
- District: Nord-Kivu

Nord-Kivu District (French: District du Nord-Kivu, Dutch: District Noord-Kivu) was a district of the Belgian Congo and the Democratic Republic of the Congo. It roughly corresponded in area to the present North Kivu province.

== Belgian Congo ==
Kivu District was created by an arrêté royal of 28 March 1912, which divided the Congo into 22 districts. A 1912 map shows that the former Stanleyville District had been broken into a much smaller Stanleyville Districts and the new districts of Lowa, Ituri, Kivu and Maniema. Kivu District became part of the Orientale Province created in 1913. With the 1933 reorganization Orientale Province was divided into Stanleyville Province in the north and Costermansville Province in the south. The boundaries of Maniema and Kivu had been adjusted, and these two districts made up Costermansville Province.

On 27 May 1947 Costermansville Province was renamed Kivu Province. By 1954 it consisted of the districts of Sud-Kivu, Nord-Kivu and Maniema. A 1955–1957 map shows Nord-Kivu District bordered by Ituri District to the north, Uganda and Rwanda-Burundi to the east, Sud-Kivu District to the south and Maniema District and Stanleyville District to the west. The area was 62,000 square kilometres (24,000 sq mi) out of a total of 259,000 square kilometres (100,000 sq mi) for Kivu province as a whole.

== Post-Independence ==
On 10 May 1962 the administration of Kivu Province was taken over by the central government, which created the separate provinces of Maniema and Nord-Kivu. Kivu Province was reunited on 28 December 1966. On 20 July 1988 it was divided into the provinces of Maniema, North Kivu and South Kivu.

== Maps ==
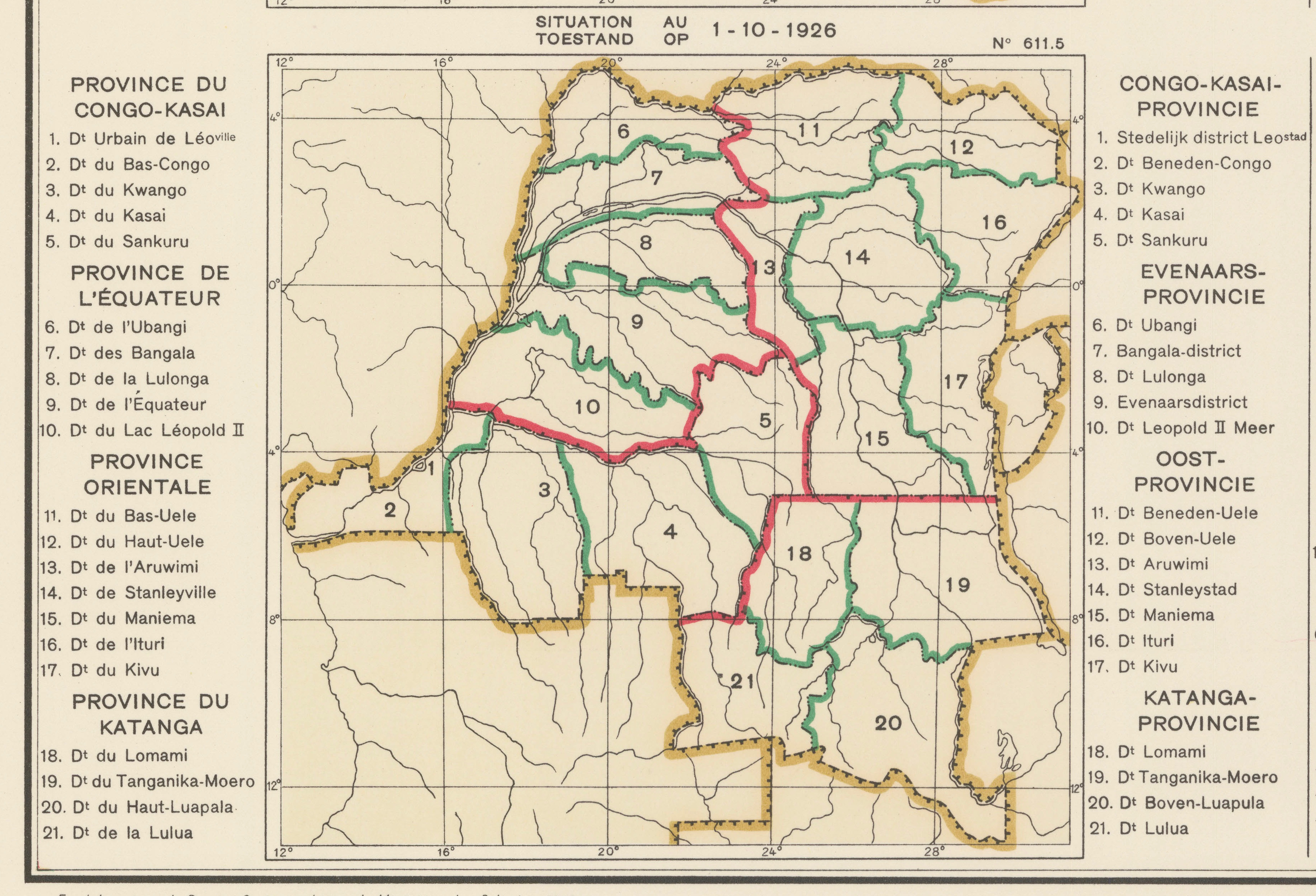
1926 provinces and districts

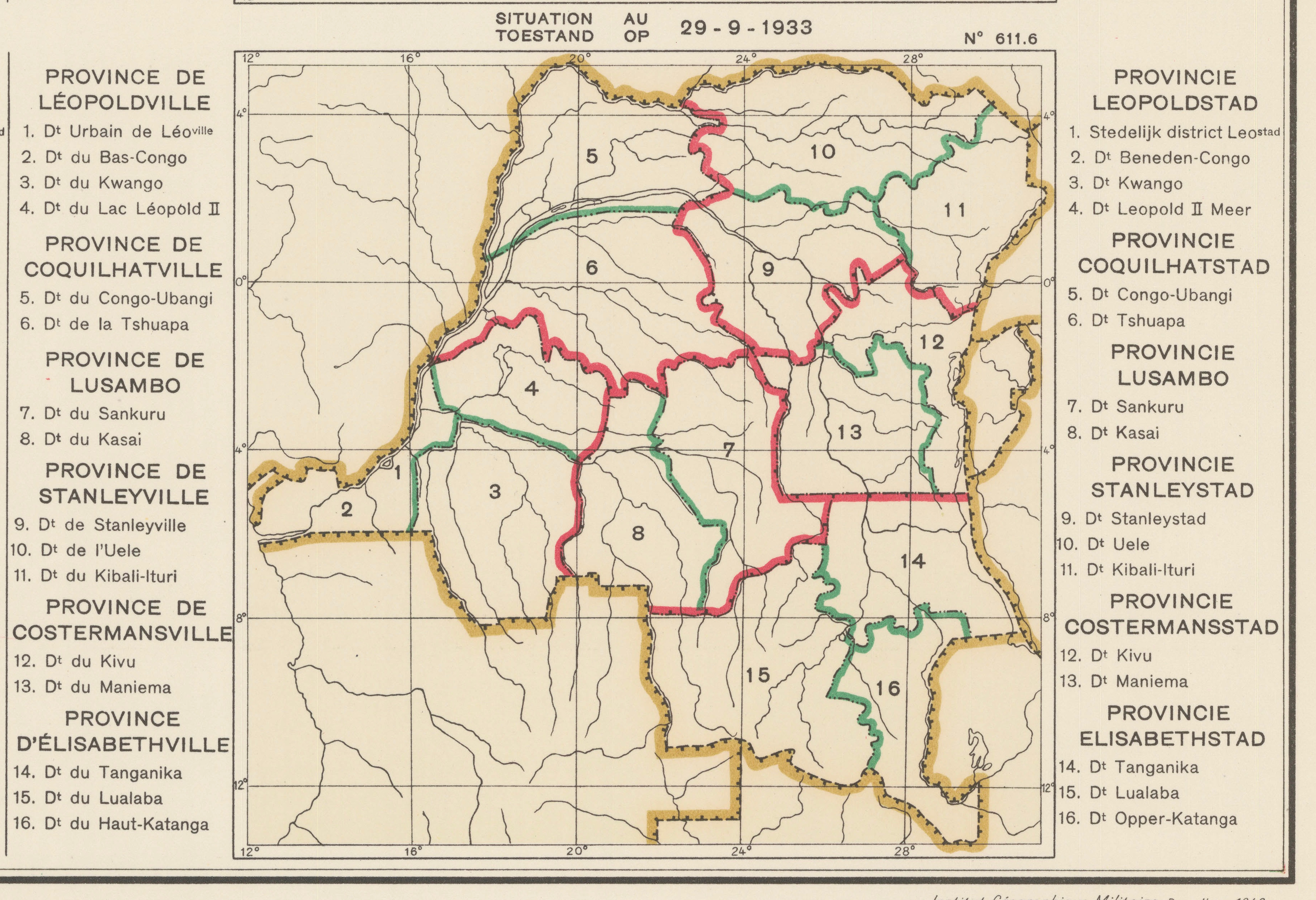
1933 provinces and districts

The present North Kivu Province

== See also ==
- Districts of the Belgian Congo

== Sources ==
- Atlas général du Congo / Algemene atlas van Congo (in French and Dutch), Belgium: Institut Royal Colonial Belge, 1948–1963, OCLC 681334449
- Brass, William (8 December 2015), Demography of Tropical Africa, Princeton University Press, ISBN 978-1-4008-7714-0
- "Congo (Kinshasa) Provinces", Rulers.org
- Lemarchand, René (1964), Political Awakening in the Belgian Congo, University of California Press, GGKEY:TQ2J84FWCXN
