= Ituri District =

- District
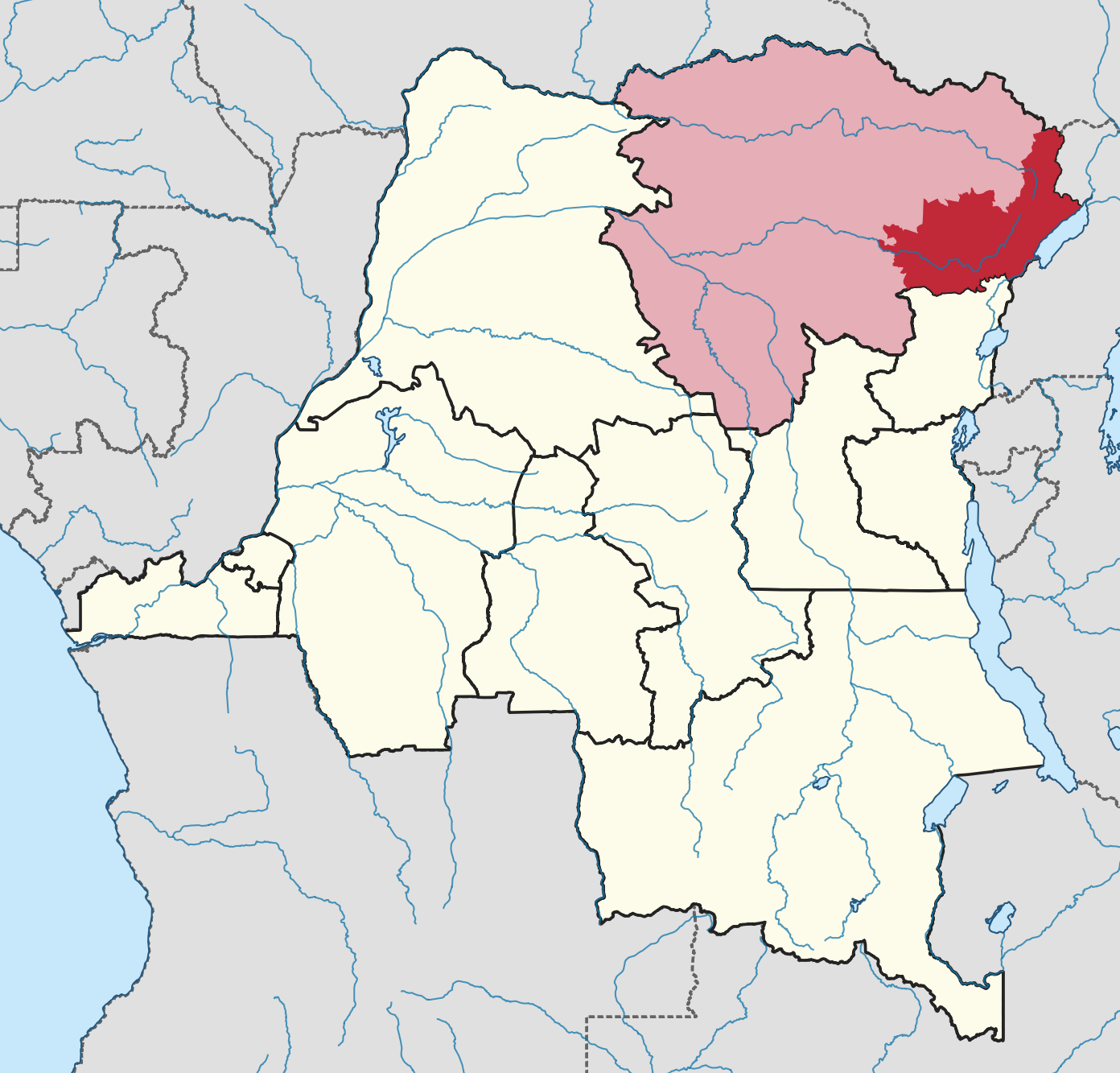
- Ituri district of Orientale province (2014)
- Coordinates: 1.833333°N 29.5°E
- Country: Democratic Republic of the Congo
- Province: Orientale
- District: Ituri

Ituri District (French: District de l'Ituri, Dutch: District Iruri), later Kibali-Ituri District, was a district of the Belgian Congo and the Democratic Republic of the Congo. It roughly corresponded in area to the present Ituri Province.

== Belgian Congo ==
Ituri District was created by an arrêté royal of 28 March 1912, which divided the Congo into 22 districts. It was named after the Ituri River. A 1912 map shows that the former Stanleyville District had been broken into a much smaller Stanleyville Districts and the new districts of Lowa, Ituri, Kivu and Maniema. Ituri District bordered British territory to the east, Haut-Uele District to the north, Stanleyville District to the west and Kivu District to the south. Ituri District became part of the Orientale Province created in 1913.

With the 1933 reorganization Orientale Province was divided into Stanleyville Province in the north and Costermansville Province in the south. Ituri District was part of Stanleyville Province. It had been expanded to take part of Haut-Uele District, while the rest of Haut-Uele District and Bas-Uele District had been merged into Uele District.

On 27 May 1947 Stanleyville Province was renamed Orientale Province. By 1954 it consisted of the districts of Stanleyville, Ituri, Bas-Uele and Haut-Uele. A 1955–1957 map shows Ituri District bordered by Haut-Uele District to the north, British territory to the east, Nord-Kivu District to the south and Stanleyville District to the west. The area was 65,700 square kilometres (25,400 sq mi) out of a total of 503,200 square kilometres (194,300 sq mi) for Orientale province as a whole.

== Post-Independence ==
On 27 July 1962 the administration of Orientale Province was taken over by the central government. It was divided into the new provinces of Kibali-Ituri, Uélé and Haut-Congo. On 28 December 1966 Orientale Province was reunited. On 11 July 2015 it was split into provinces of Bas-Uélé, Haut-Uélé, Ituri, and Tshopo.

== Maps ==
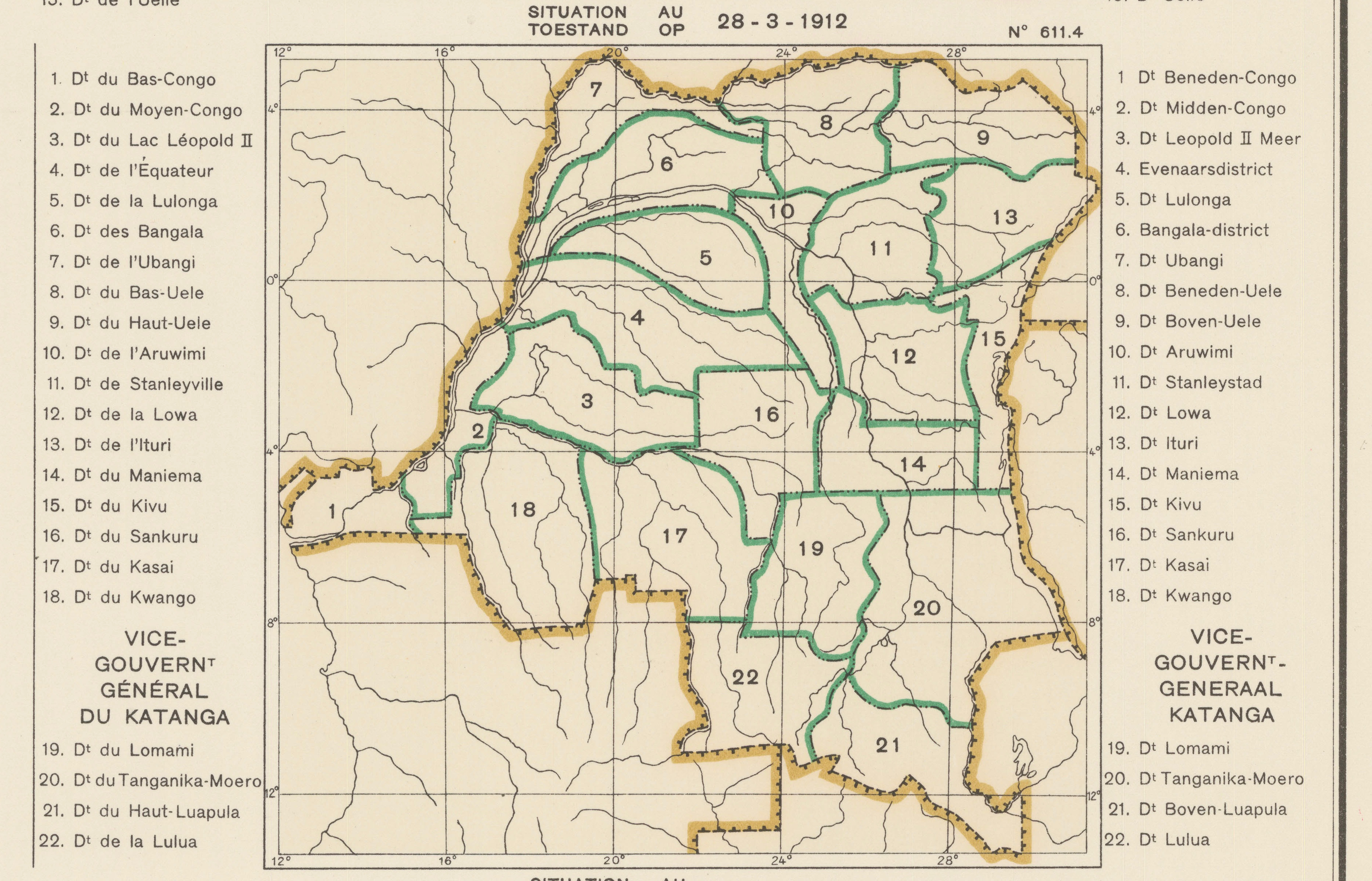
1912 districts

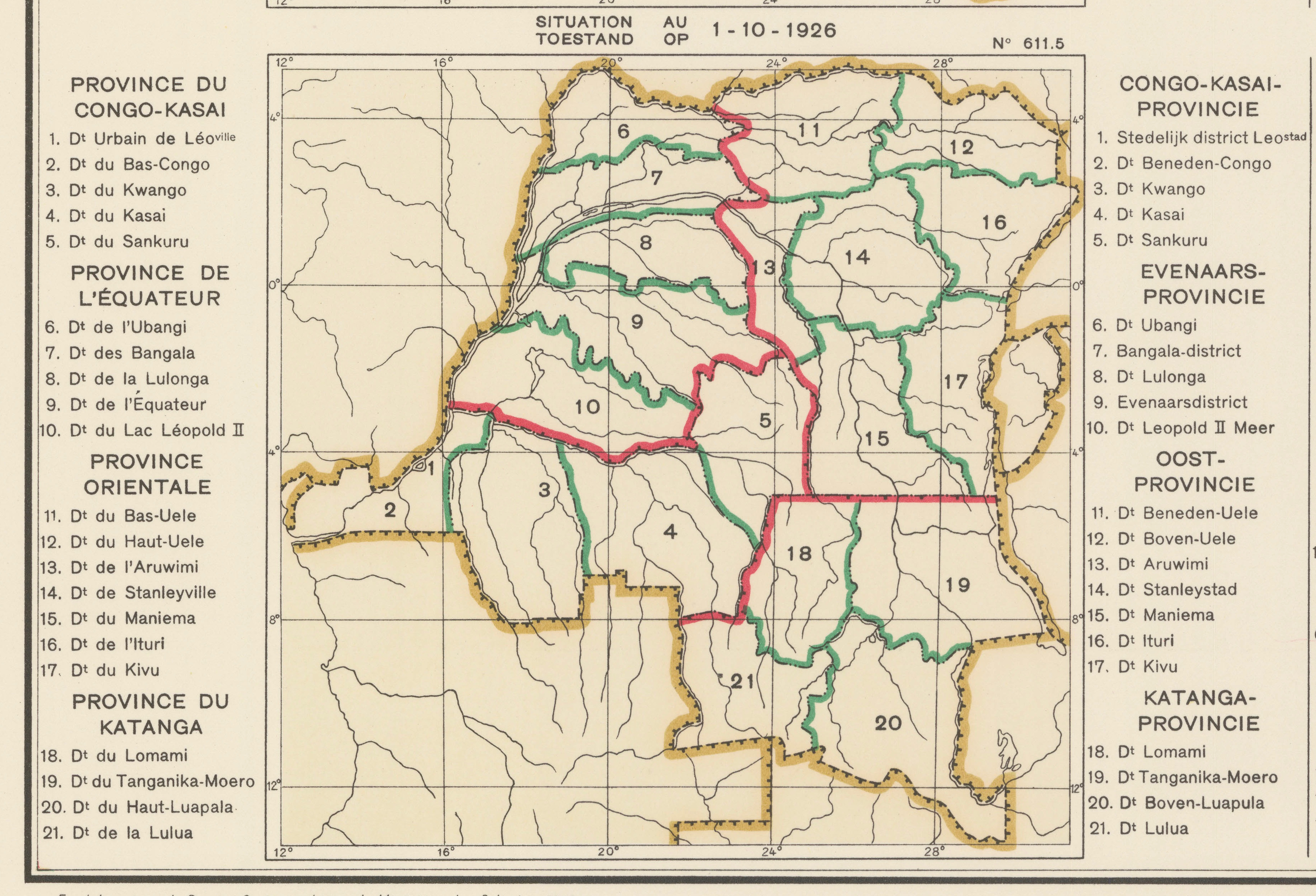
1926 provinces and districts

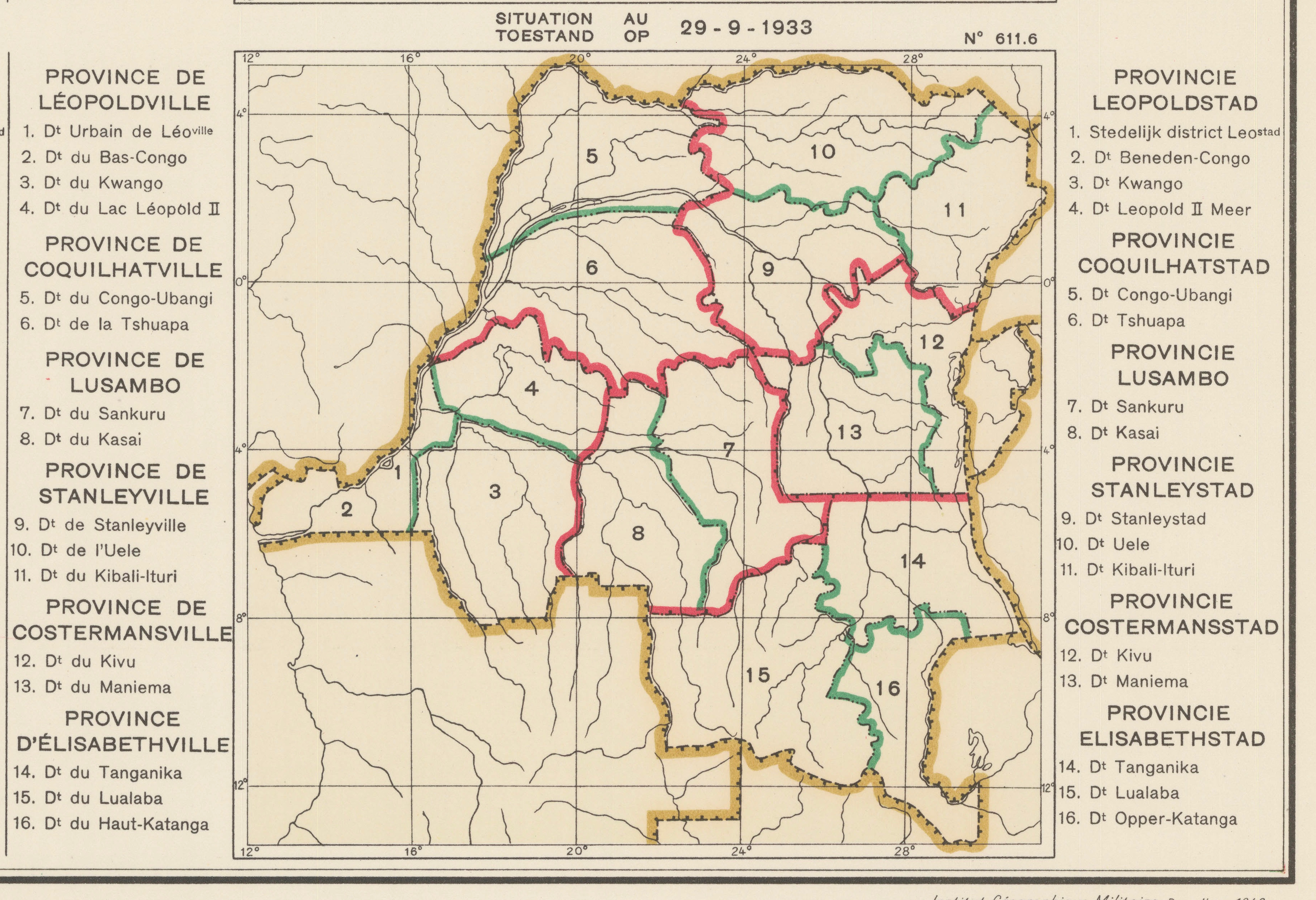
1933 provinces and districts

Current province of Ituri

== See also ==
- Ituri Interim Administration
- Districts of the Belgian Congo
- Districts of the Democratic Republic of the Congo

== Sources ==
- Atlas général du Congo / Algemene atlas van Congo (in French and Dutch), Belgium: Institut Royal Colonial Belge, 1948–1963, OCLC 681334449
- Brass, William (8 December 2015), Demography of Tropical Africa, Princeton University Press, ISBN 978-1-4008-7714-0
- "Congo (Kinshasa) Provinces", Rulers.org
- Lemarchand, René (1964), Political Awakening in the Belgian Congo, University of California Press, GGKEY:TQ2J84FWCXN
