= Bas-Uele District =

- District
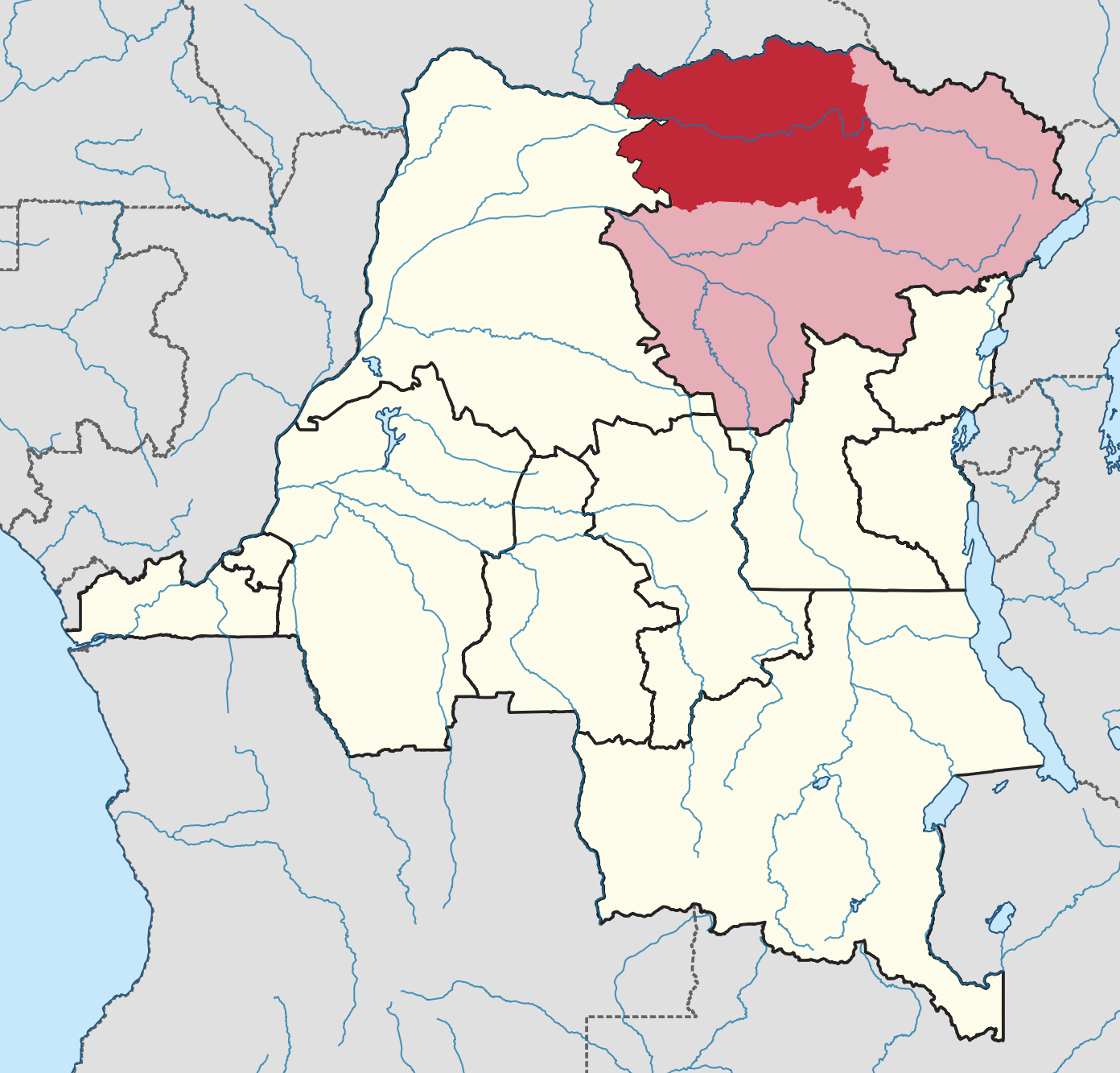
- Bas-Uele district of Orientale province (2014)
- Coordinates: 2.802456°N 24.733658°E
- Country: Democratic Republic of the Congo
- Province: Orientale
- District: Bas-Uele

Bas-Uele District (French: District du Bas-Uele, Dutch: District Beneden-Uele) was a district of the Belgian Congo and the Democratic Republic of the Congo. It was formed from part of Uele District in 1912 and was later merged into Uele District, then split out again. There were various boundary changes. It roughly corresponded in area to the present Bas-Uélé province.

== Location ==
Bas-Uele District (Lower Uele District) was named after the Uele River, and covers the lower part of the river basin. To the west the river joins the Mbomou River to form the Ubangi River, which defined the northwest boundary of the colony. Most of the inhabitants of the Bas-Uele District, with a population of 900,000 in 2007, are Boa people. They live mainly through subsistence farming and hunting, with some river commerce.

== Belgian Congo ==
The district was created by an arrêté royal of 28 March 1912, which divided the Congo into 22 districts. A 1912 map shows that the former Uele District had been broken into the Bas-Uele and Haut-Uele (Upper Uele) districts. Bas-Uele was bordered by French territory to the north, Haut-Uele to the east, Stanleyville and Aruwimi to the south, and Bangala and Ubangi to the west. The Bas-Uele District became part of the Orientale Province created in 1913.

With the 1933 reorganization Bas-Uele and Haut-Uele were again combined into Uele District, and lay in the new Stanleyville Province. By 1954 Stanleyville Province had been renamed Orientale Province, and Uele District had again been split into Bas-Uele and Haut-Uele districts. A 1955–1957 map shows Bas-Uele District bordered by French territory to the north, Haut-Uele District to the east, Stanleyville District to the south and Mongala District to the west. The area was 148,300 square kilometres (57,300 sq mi) out of a total of 503,200 square kilometres (194,300 sq mi) for Orientale province as a whole.

== Post-Independence ==
On 27 July 1962 the administration of Orientale Province was taken over by the central government. It was divided into the new provinces of Kibali-Ituri, Uélé and Haut-Congo. On 28 December 1966 Orientale Province was reunited. On 11 July 2015 it was split into the provinces of Bas-Uélé, Haut-Uélé, Ituri and Tshopo.

== Maps ==
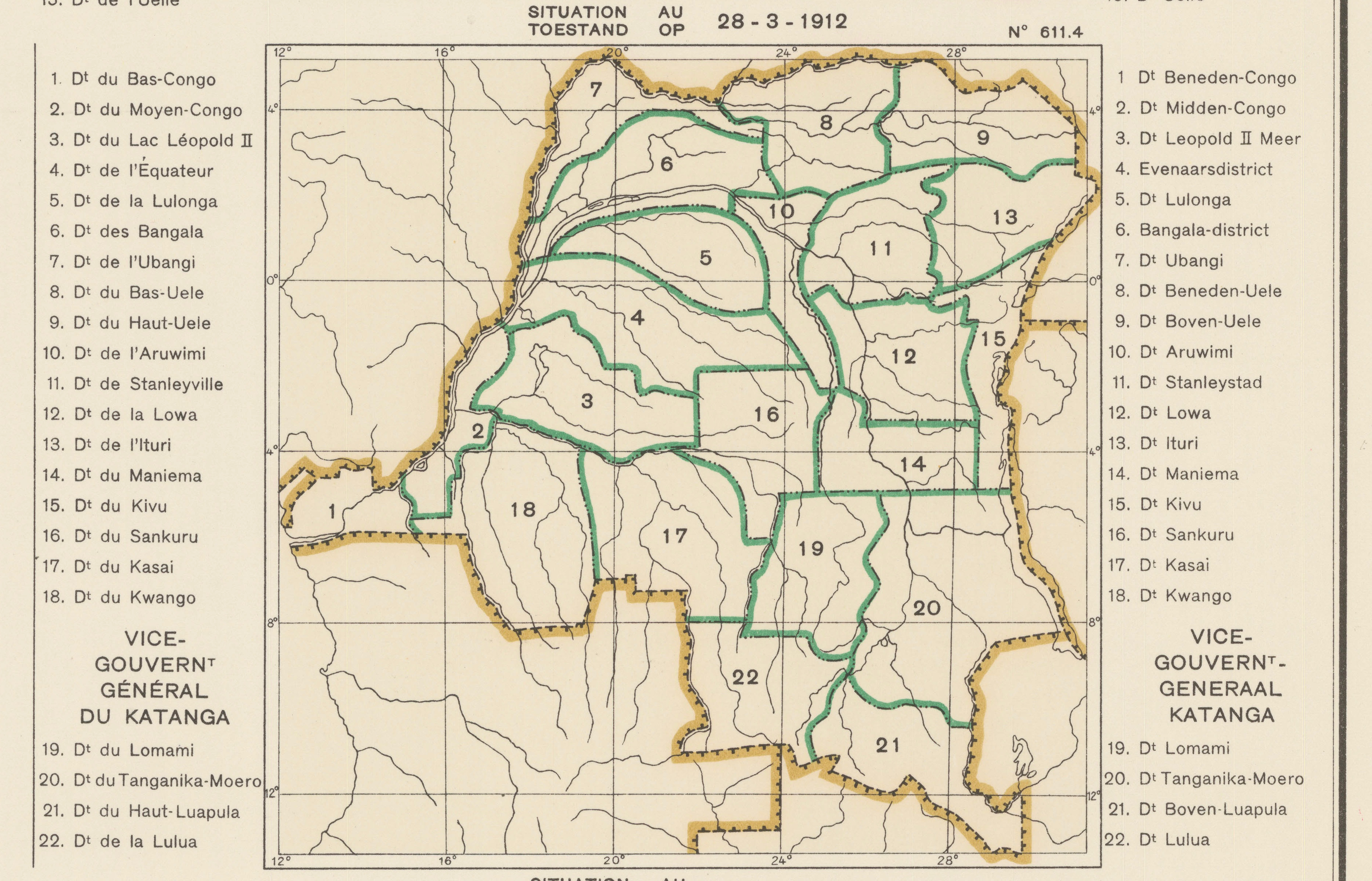
1912 provinces and districts

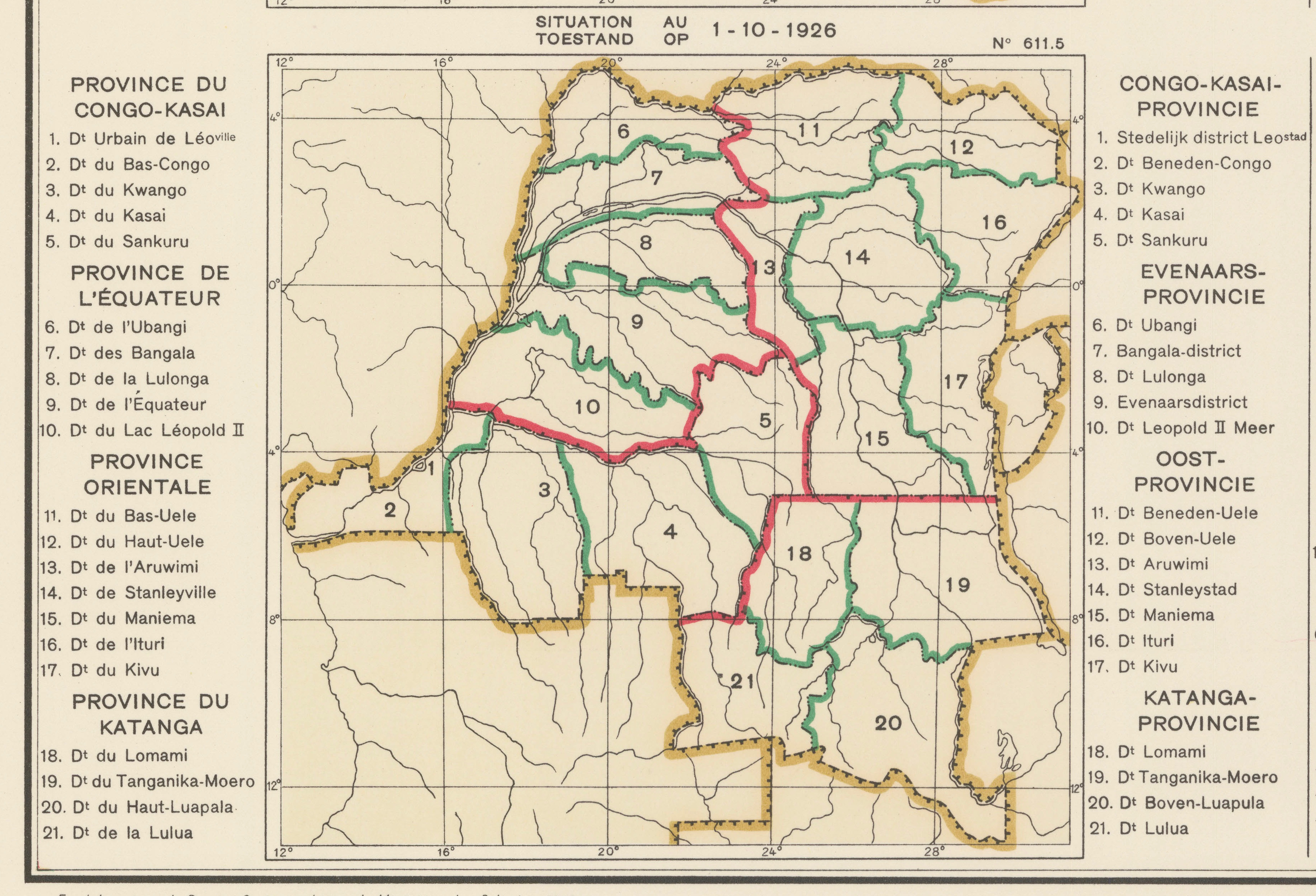
1926 provinces and districts

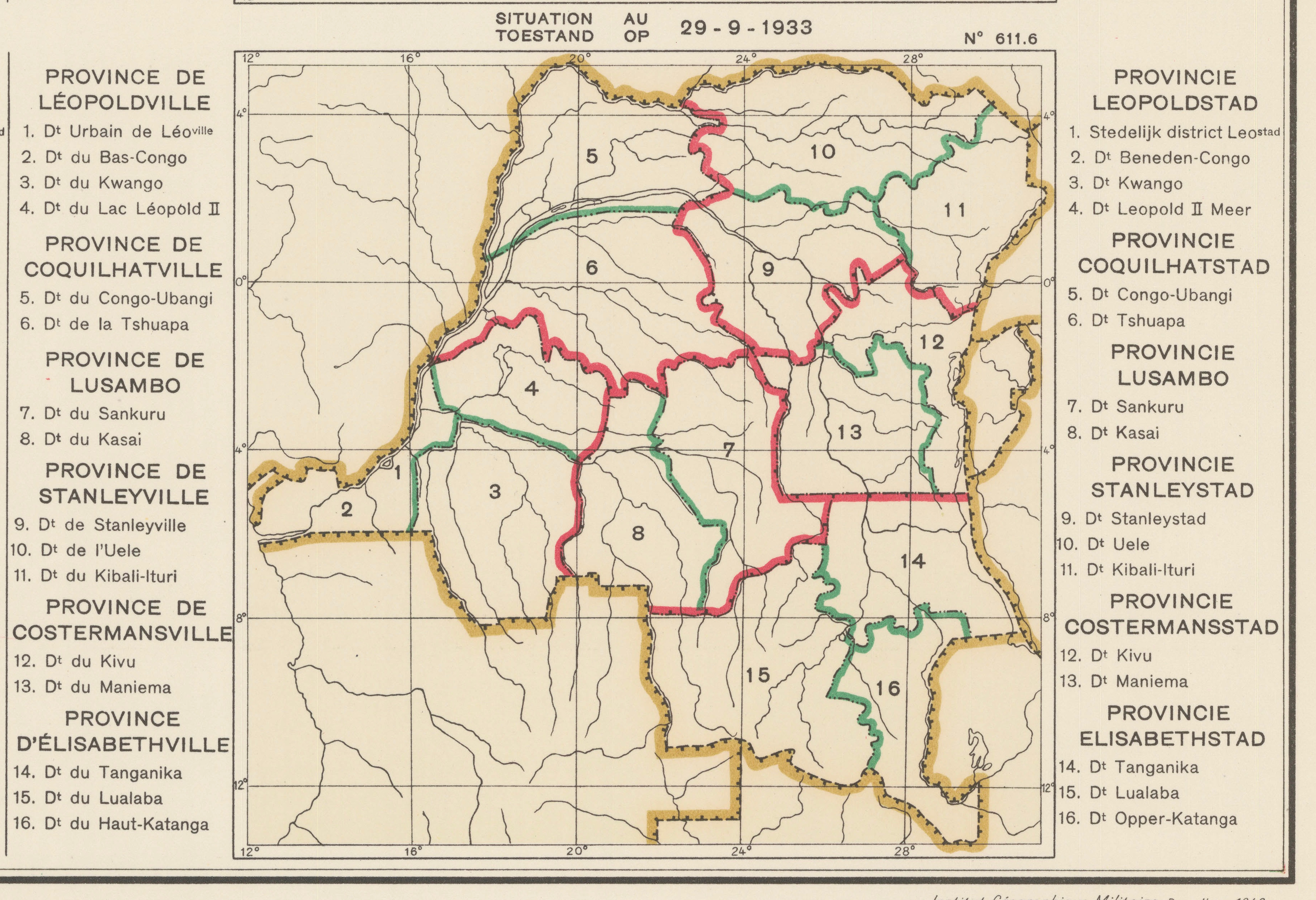
1933 provinces and districts

Bas-Uélé province

== See also ==
- Districts of the Belgian Congo
- Districts of the Democratic Republic of the Congo

== Sources ==
- Atlas général du Congo / Algemene atlas van Congo (in French and Dutch), Belgium: Institut Royal Colonial Belge, 1948–1963, OCLC 681334449
- Brass, William (8 December 2015), Demography of Tropical Africa, Princeton University Press, ISBN 978-1-4008-7714-0
- "Congo (Kinshasa) Provinces", Rulers.org
- Kisangani, Emizet F.; Bobb, F. Scott (2010). Historical Dictionary of the Democratic Republic of the Congo. Scarecrow Press. ISBN 978-0-8108-5761-2.
- Lemarchand, René (1964), Political Awakening in the Belgian Congo, University of California Press, GGKEY:TQ2J84FWCXN
