= Kivu District =

- District
- Location within Democratic Republic of the Congo
- Coordinates: 2.509163°S 28.837449°E
- Country: Belgian Congo
- Province: Orientale
- District: Lowa

Kivu District (French: District du Kivu, Dutch: District Kivu) was a district of the Belgian Congo. It was formed from part of Stanleyville District in 1914.

== Location ==
Kivu District was named after Lake Kivu, on the border between the Belgian and German colonies. Between 30 June 1900 and 27 July 1901 Jules Alexandre Milz undertook a special mission to delimit the Belgian-German border in Kivu. The district was created by an arrêté royal of 28 March 1912, which divided the Congo into 22 districts. A 1912 map shows that the large former Stanleyville District had been broken into a much smaller Stanleyville District and new Lowa, Maniema, Kivu and Ituri districts. Kivu District was bordered by German and British colonies to the east, Ituri District to the north, Lowa and Maniema districts to the west and Tanganika-Moero District to the south.

The Kivu District became part of the Orientale Province created in 1913. By 1926 Lowa District had disappeared, absorbed into the Kivu District and Maniema District, and Kivu now extended further to the west. With the 1933 reorganization Kivu and Maniema were contained in the new Costermansville Province. The western part of Kivu had been restored to Maniema, but an area in the northwest had been added, taken from Stanleyville District. By 1954 Costermansville Province had been renamed Kivu Province, and Kivu District had been split into Sud-Kivu District and Nord-Kivu District

== Maps ==
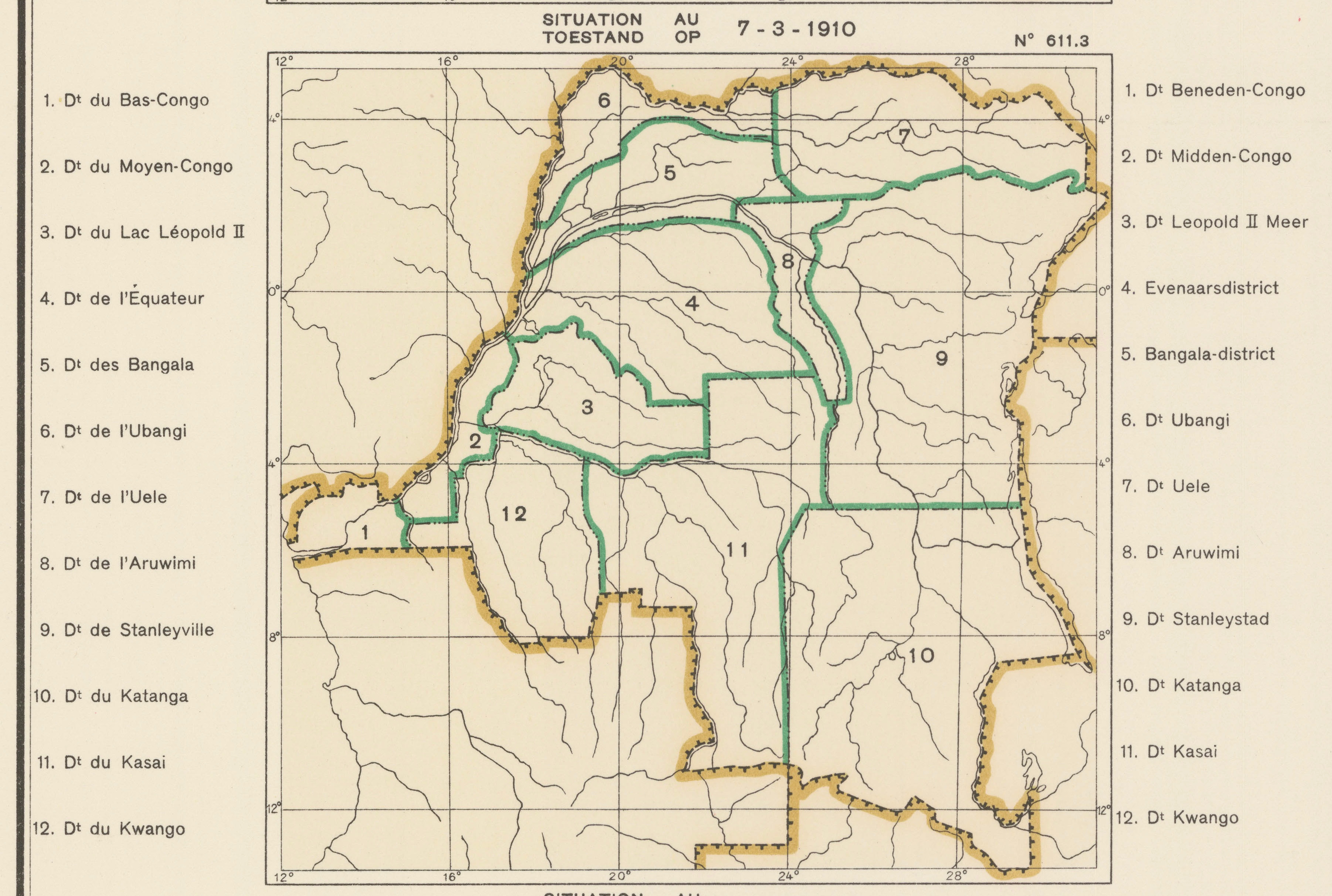
1910 provinces and districts

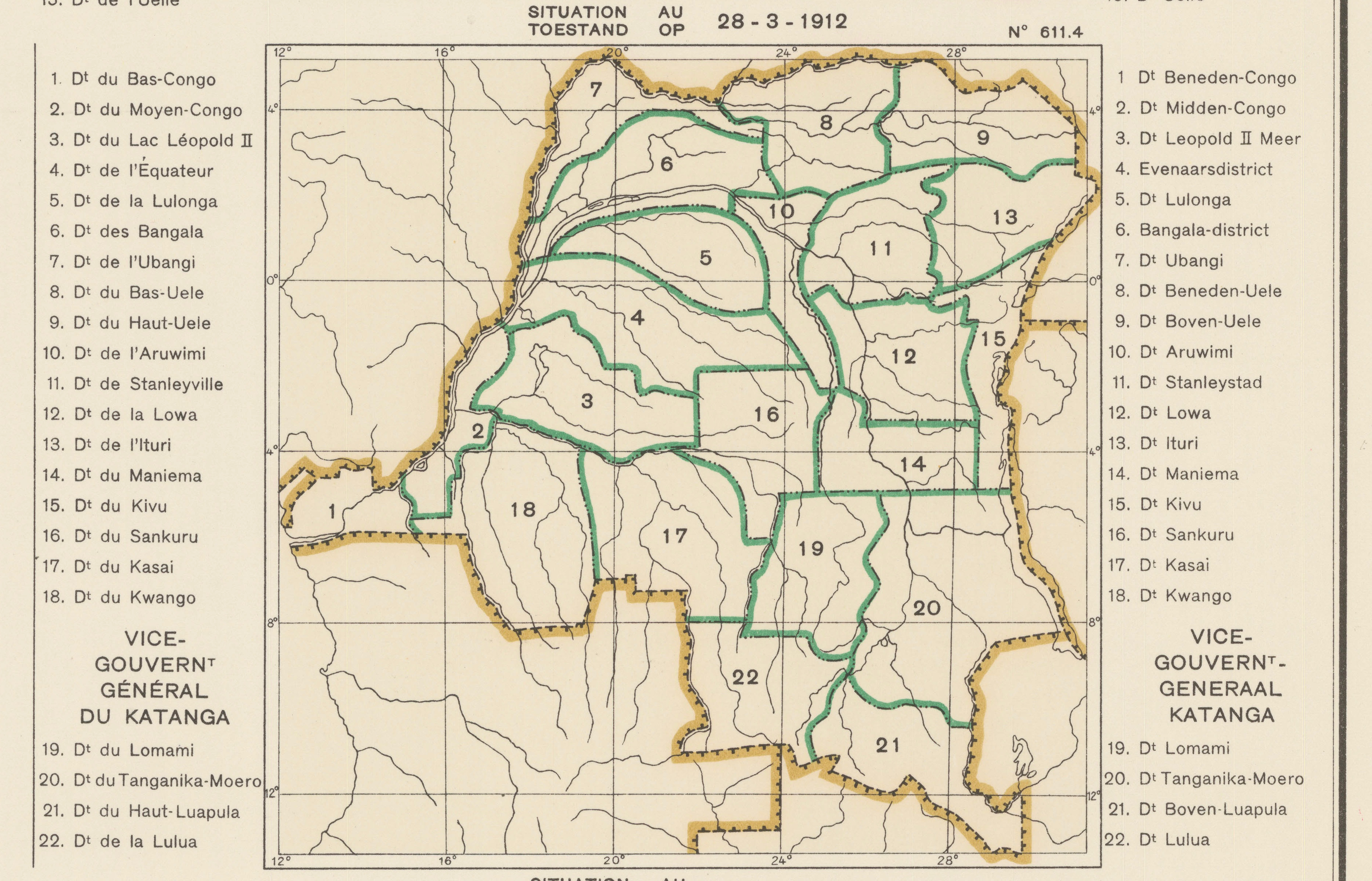
1912 provinces and districts

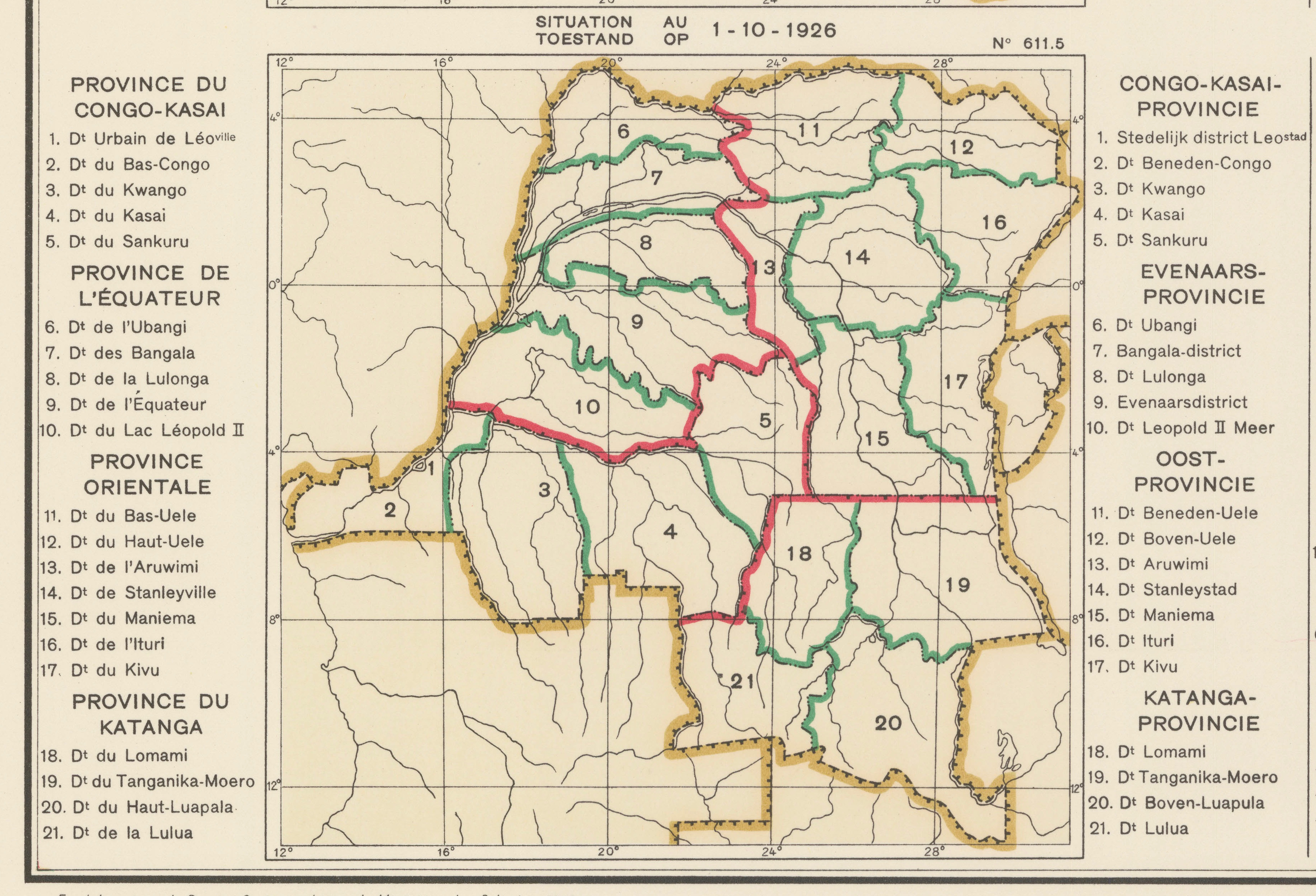
1926 provinces and districts

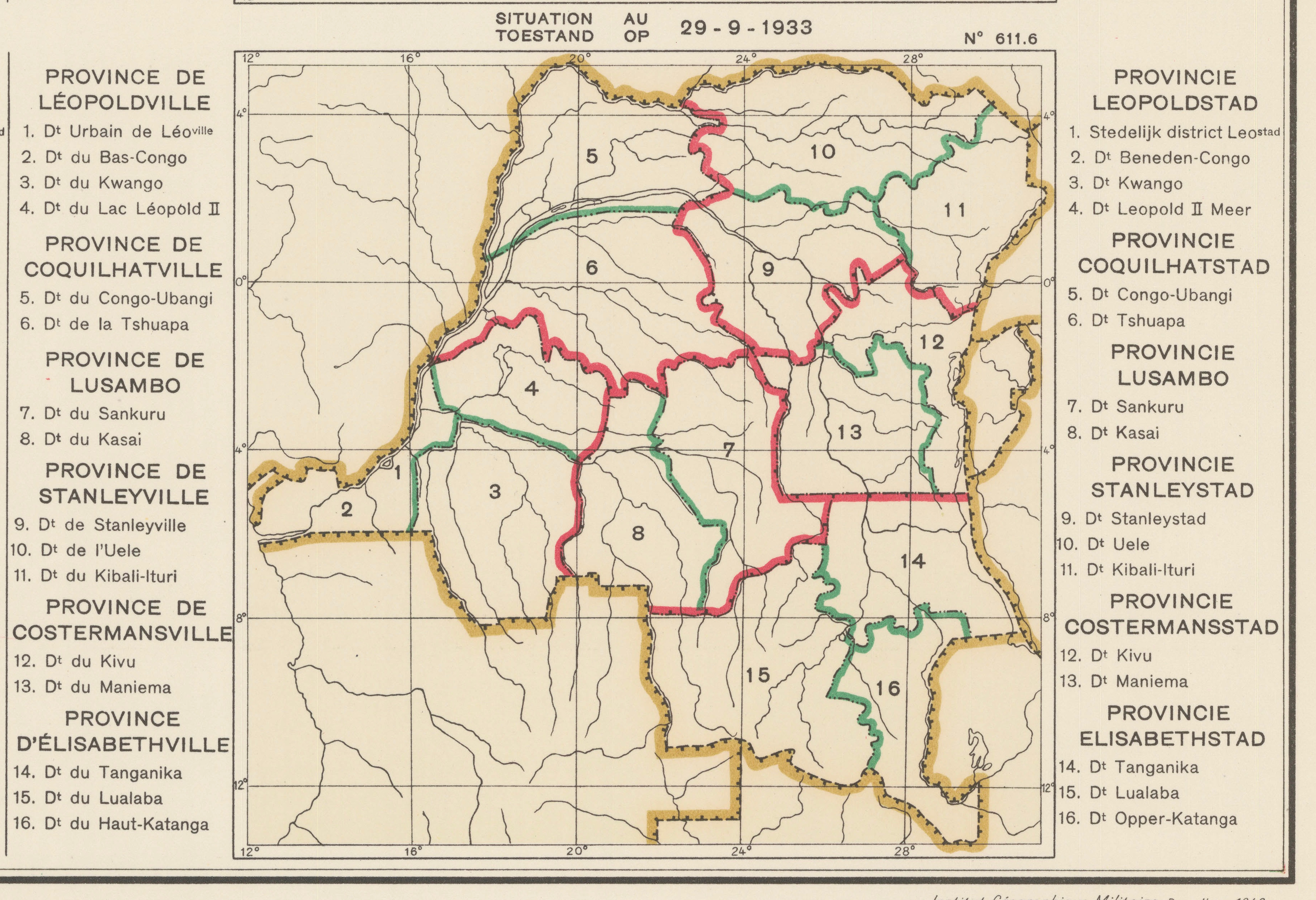
1933 provinces and districts

== See also ==
- Districts of the Belgian Congo

== Sources ==
- Atlas général du Congo / Algemene atlas van Congo (in French and Dutch), Belgium: Institut Royal Colonial Belge, 1948–1963, OCLC 681334449
- Coosemans, M. (20 May 1946), "MILZ (Jules-Alexandre)", Biographie Belge d'Outre-Mer (in French), vol. I, Académie Royale des Sciences d'Outre-Mer, pp. 697–701
- Lemarchand, René (1964), Political Awakening in the Belgian Congo, University of California Press, GGKEY:TQ2J84FWCXN
