= Dichomeris polygnampta =

Scientific classification
- Kingdom: Animalia
- Phylum: Arthropoda
- Class: Insecta
- Order: Lepidoptera
- Family: Gelechiidae
- Genus: Dichomeris
- Species: D. polygnampta

Binomial name
- Dichomeris polygnampta (Meyrick, 1938)

Synonyms
- Trichotaphe polygnampta Meyrick, 1938

Species of moth

Dichomeris polygnampta is a moth in the family Gelechiidae. It was described by Edward Meyrick in 1938. It is found in the former Orientale Province of the Democratic Republic of the Congo.
