= Stanleyville District =

- District
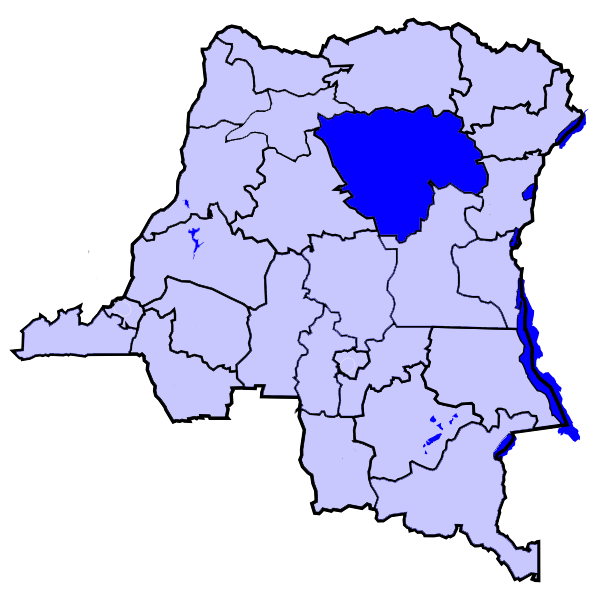
- Tshopo District as of 2015
- Coordinates: 0.516667°N 25.2°E
- Country: Democratic Republic of the Congo
- Province: Orientale
- District: Stanleyville

Stanleyville District (French: District de Stanleyville, Dutch: District Stanleystad) was a district of the Belgian Congo and Democratic Republic of the Congo. It went through various changes in extent. Between 1933 and 1963 it had roughly the same extent as the current Tshopo province.

== Congo Free State ==
An 1897 map of the Congo Free State showed the huge Stanley Falls District where the later Stanleyville and Katanga districts would be created. A 1910 map of the Belgian Congo shows the Stanleyville District along the northeastern border of the colony, with Uele District to the north, Aruwimi District and Kasai District to the west and Katanga District to the south. It covers the region of the Congo River basin upstream from Stanleyville down to the northern border of Katanga, as well as most of the course of the Aruwimi River.

== Belgian Congo ==
A 1914 map shows the district had been broken into a much smaller Stanleyville District and new Lowa, Maniema, Kivu and Ituri districts. These districts as well as Bas Uele, Haut Uele and Aruwimi constituted the Orientale Province, created in 1914. A map of the colony after the 1933 reorganization into six provinces shows that Stanleyville district was now part of Stanleyville Province, which also contained the reconstituted Uele District and Kibali-Ituri District. Stanleyville District had absorbed Aruwimi District but had lost some territory to Kivu District.

Stanleyville Province was renamed Orientale/Oost Province in 1947. A 1955–1957 map shows Stanleyville District bordered by Mongala District and Bas-Uele District to the north, Haut-Uele District to the northeast, Ituri District and Nord-Kivu District to the east, Maniema District to the south and Tshuapa District to the west. The area was 199,600 square kilometres (77,100 sq mi) out of a total of 503,200 square kilometres (194,300 sq mi) for Orientale province as a whole.

== Post-independence ==
Orientale Province was broken up in 1963 into Kibali-Ituri, Uélé and Haut-Congo provinces. Haut-Congo corresponded to the former Stanleyville District. Orientale Province was reconstituted in 1966. It was renamed Haut-Zaïre Province from 1971–1997, then returned to the name of Orientale Province from 1997 to 2015. In 2015 Orientale Province was broken into the provinces of Bas-Uélé, Haut-Uélé, Ituri and Tshopo. Tshopo roughly corresponds to Haut-Congo Province and to Stanleyville District as it was between 1933 and 1963.

== Maps ==
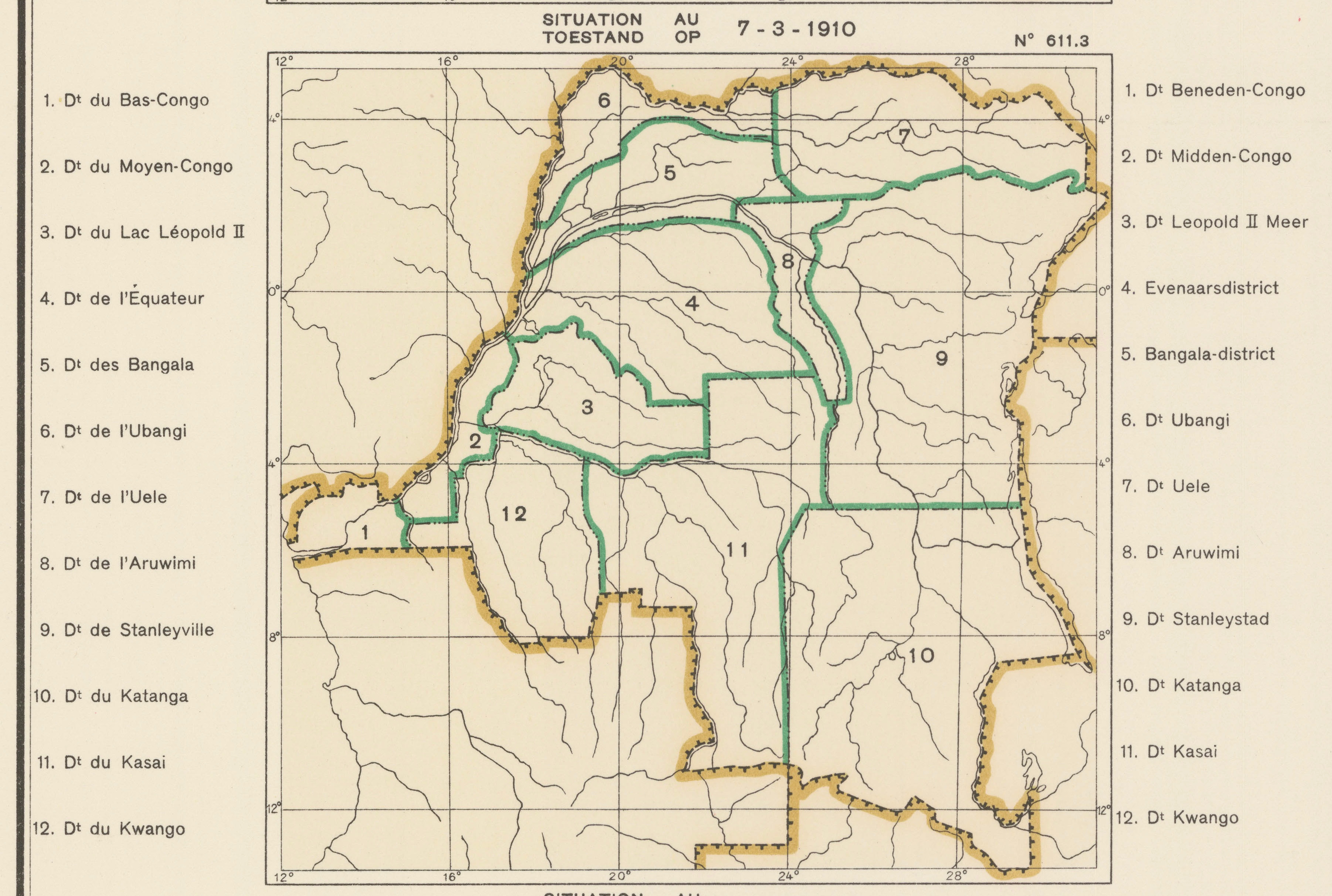
1910 provinces and districts

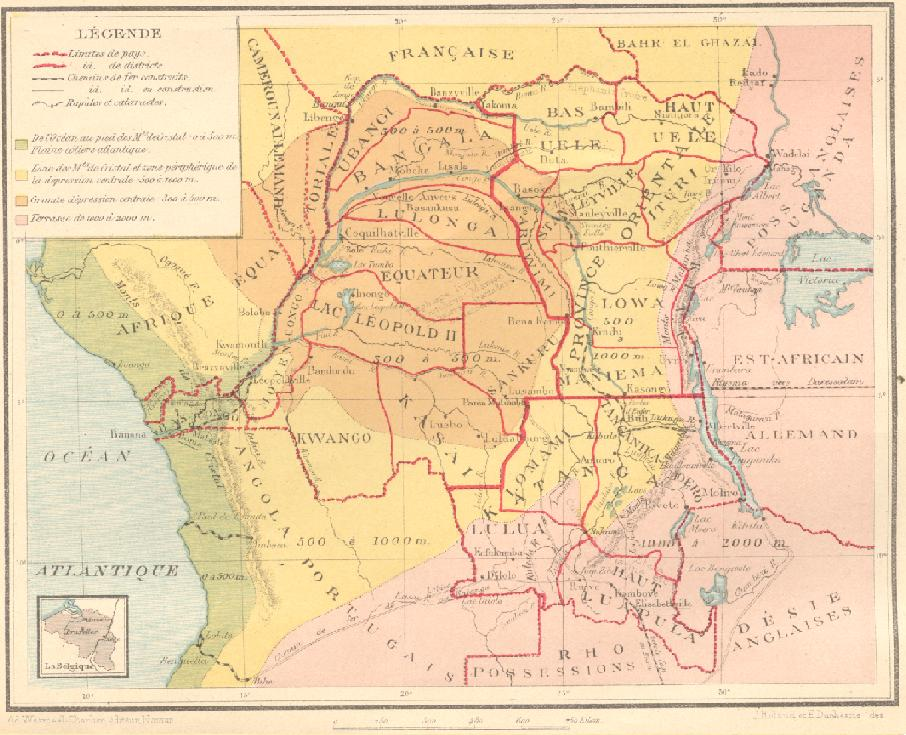
1914 districts

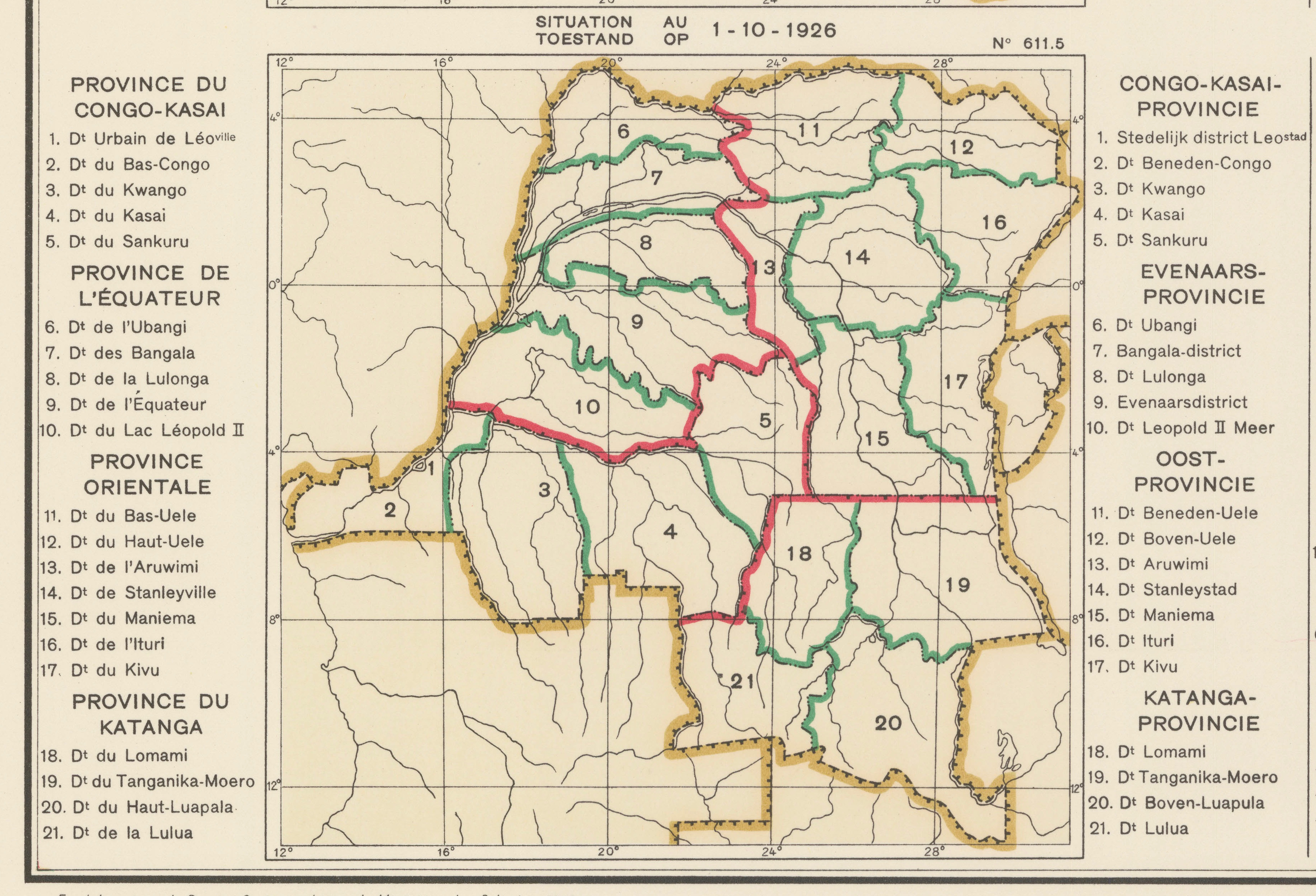
1926 provinces and districts

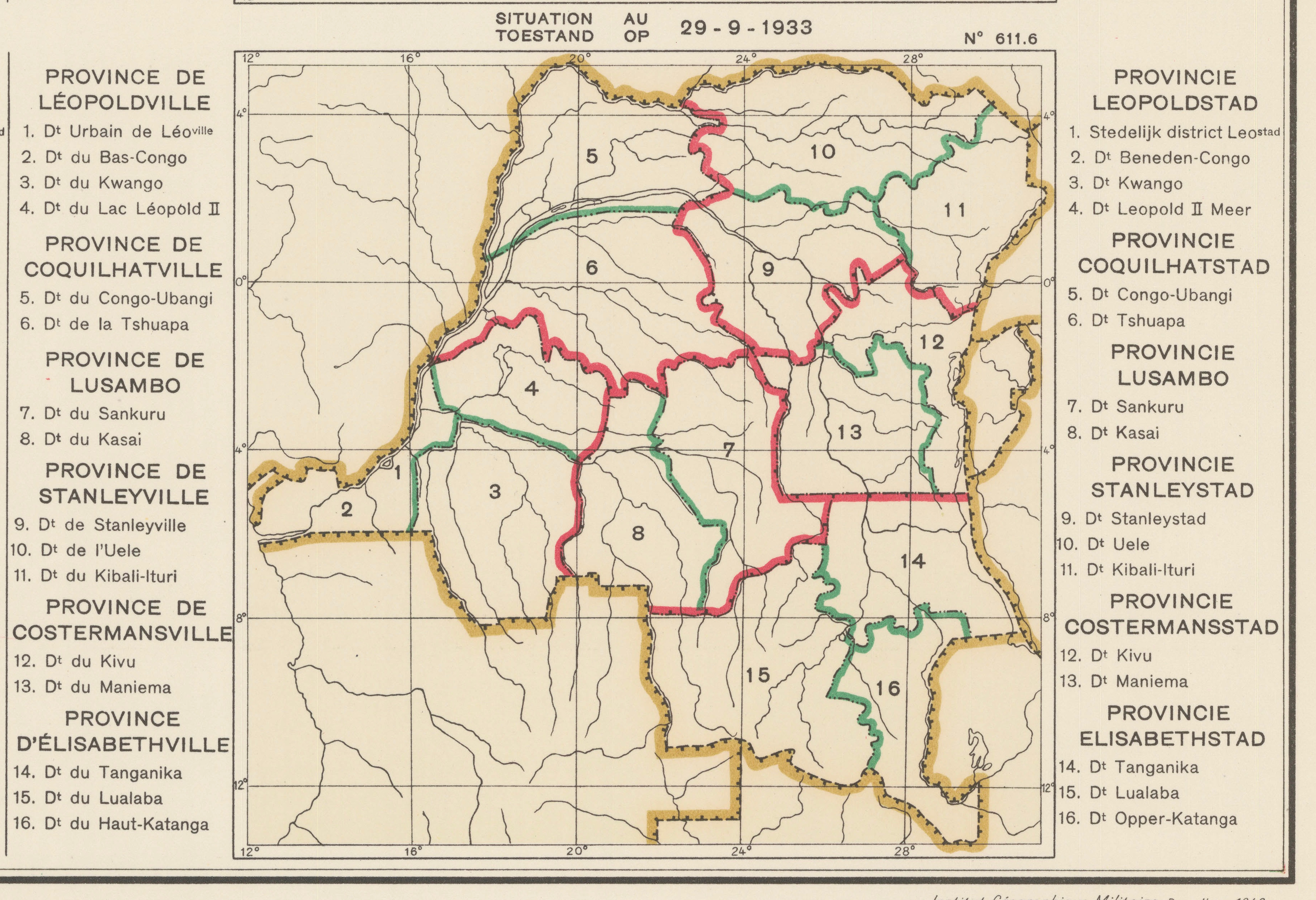
1933 provinces and districts

== See also ==
- Districts of the Belgian Congo

== Sources ==
- Atlas général du Congo / Algemene atlas van Congo (in French and Dutch), Belgium: Institut Royal Colonial Belge, 1948–1963, OCLC 681334449
- Brass, William (8 December 2015), Demography of Tropical Africa, Princeton University Press, ISBN 978-1-4008-7714-0
- "Congo (Kinshasa) Provinces", Rulers.org
- Omasombo Tshonda, Jean (2015), Mongala : Jonction des territoires et bastion d'une identité supra-ethnique (PDF), Musée royal de l’Afrique centrale, ISBN 978-9-4922-4416-1
- Roland, J.; Duchesne, E. (1914), "Congo Belge, Administrative (1914)", Le Congo Belge, Namur: Wesmael-Charlier
