= Lecithocera trifera =

Scientific classification
- Kingdom: Animalia
- Phylum: Arthropoda
- Class: Insecta
- Order: Lepidoptera
- Family: Lecithoceridae
- Genus: Lecithocera
- Species: L. trifera

Binomial name
- Lecithocera trifera Meyrick, 1938

Species of moth in the genus Lecithocera

Lecithocera trifera is a moth in the family Lecithoceridae. It was described by Edward Meyrick in 1938. It is found in the former Orientale Province of the Democratic Republic of the Congo.
