= Maniema District =

District of the Democratic Republic of the Congo

- District
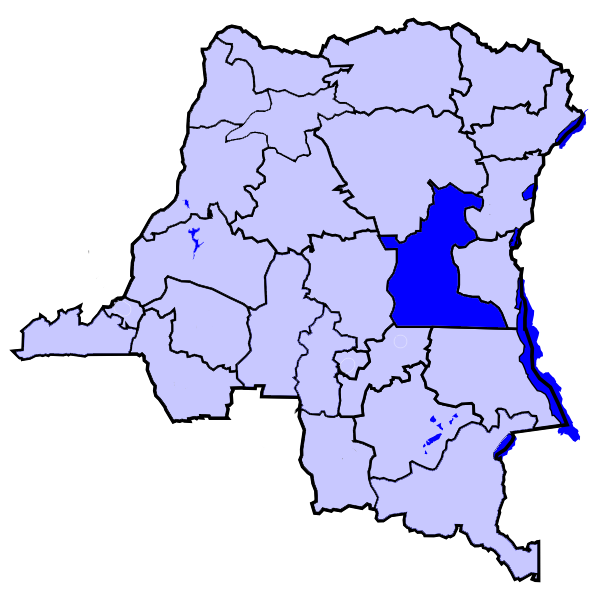
- Coordinates: 2.95°S 25.95°E
- Country: Democratic Republic of the Congo
- Province: Orientale

Maniema District (French: District du Maniema, Dutch: District Maniema) was a district of the Belgian Congo and the Democratic Republic of the Congo. It roughly corresponded in area to the present Maniema province.

== Location ==
Henry Morton Stanley explored the area, which he called Manyema after the Bantu people who lived there. The district was created by an arrêté royal of 28 March 1912, which divided the Congo into 22 districts. A 1912 map shows that the former Stanleyville District had been broken into a much smaller Stanleyville Districts and the new districts of Lowa, Ituri, Kivu and Maniema. Maniema was bordered by Sankuru District to the west, Lomami District and Tanganika-Moero District to the south, Kivu District to the east and Lowa District to the north.

Maniema District became part of the Orientale Province created in 1913. A map of the colony in 1926 shows that Lowa District had been merged into Maniema District, but the new Maniema district had lost territory in the east to an expanded Kivu District. With the 1933 reorganization Orientale Province was divided into Stanleyville Province in the north and Costermansville Province in the south. The boundaries of Maniema and Kivu had been adjusted, and these two districts made up Costermansville Province.

On 27 May 1947, Costermansville Province was renamed Kivu Province. By 1954, it consisted of the districts of Sud-Kivu, Nord-Kivu and Maniema. A 1955–1957 map shows Maniema District bordered by Stanleyville District to the north, Nord-Kivu District and Sud-Kivu District to the east, Tanganika District and Kabinda District to the south and Sankuru District to the west. Compared to 1933, Maniema had lost territory in the east to the Kivus, but gained territory in the north from Nord-Kivu. The area was 132,300 square kilometres (51,100 sq mi) out of a total of 259,000 square kilometres (100,000 sq mi) for Kivu province as a whole.

On 10 May 1962, the administration of Kivu Province was taken over by the central government, which created the separate provinces of Maniema and Nord-Kivu. Kivu Province was reunited on 28 December 1966. On 20 July 1988, it was divided into the provinces of Maniema, North Kivu and South Kivu.

== Maps ==
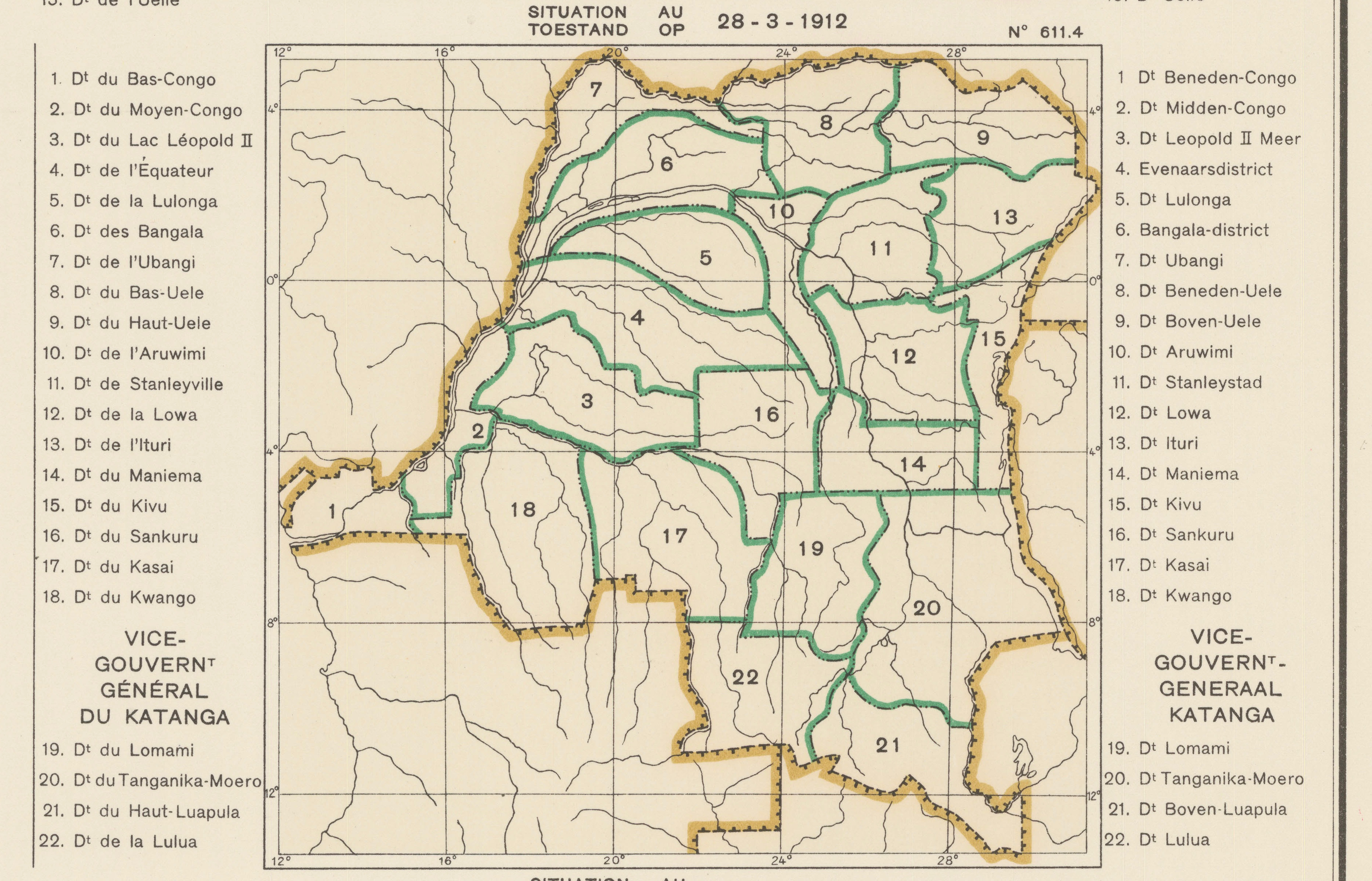
1912 districts

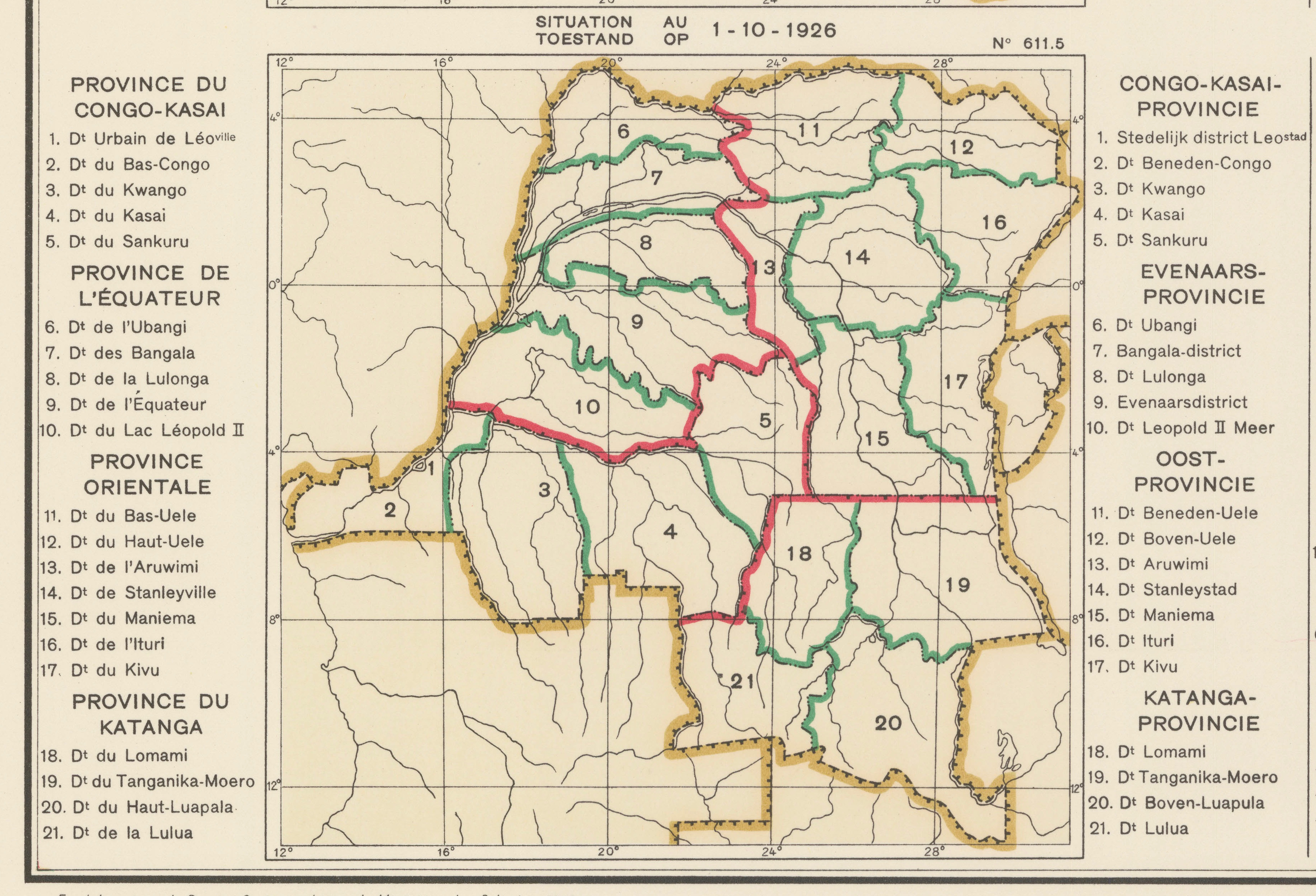
1926 provinces and districts

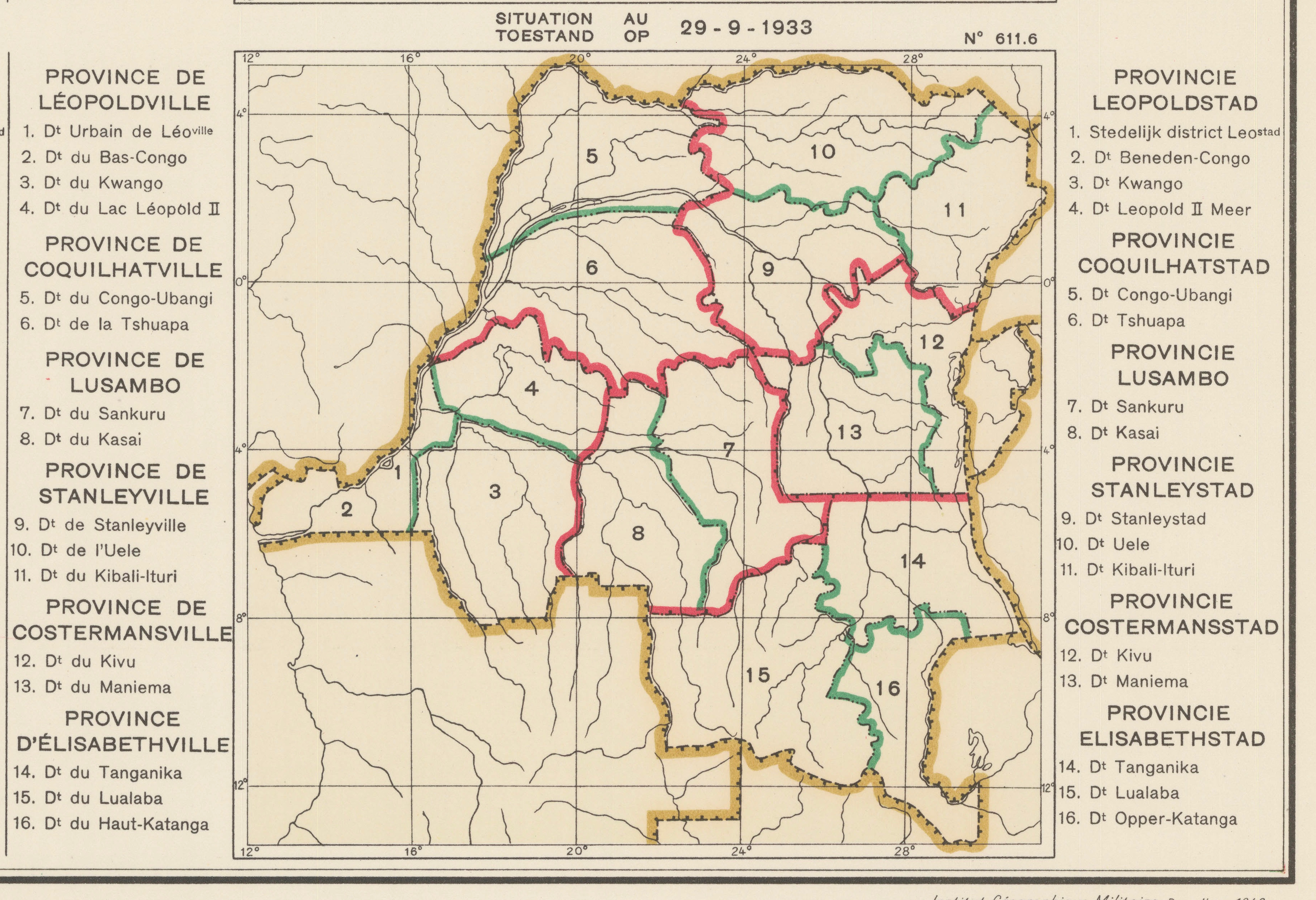
1933 provinces and districts

Maniema Province

== See also ==
- Districts of the Belgian Congo

== Sources ==
- Atlas général du Congo / Algemene atlas van Congo (in French and Dutch), Belgium: Institut Royal Colonial Belge, 1948–1963, OCLC 681334449
- Brass, William (8 December 2015), Demography of Tropical Africa, Princeton University Press, ISBN 978-1-4008-7714-0
- "Congo (Kinshasa) Provinces", Rulers.org
- Lemarchand, René (1964), Political Awakening in the Belgian Congo, University of California Press, GGKEY:TQ2J84FWCXN
- Stanley, H.M. (1899), Through the Dark Continent, London: G. Newnes, ISBN 0486256685
