= Aruwimi District =

- District
- Location within Democratic Republic of the Congo
- Coordinates: 0.584796°N 24.181770°E
- Country: Belgian Congo
- Province: Orientale
- District: Aruwimi

Aruwimi District (French: District de l'Aruwimi, Dutch: District Aruwimi) was a district of the Congo Free State and Belgian Congo. It went through various changes in extent before being absorbed into other districts.

== Congo Free State ==
Article 3 of the decree of 16 April 1887 provided for the Congo Free State to be divided into administrative districts headed by district commissioners, assisted by one or more deputies. The decree of 1 August 1888 divided the Congo Free State into eleven districts, including Aruwimi-Uele District with its headquarters in Basoko.

A map of the Congo Free State in 1888 shows the district of Aruwimi and Ouellé covering the northeast of the colony, bordering Stanley Pool District to the south, Équateur District to the southwest and Oubandji and Ouellé District to the west. The borders of the district are mostly straight lines through unexplored territory. The name comes from the Aruwimi River, formed where the Ituri River flowing west from the Lake Albert region meets the Nepoko River, and flowing west to join the Congo in the west of the district, and the Uele River, flowing through the north of the district and feeding the Ubangi River, which defined the boundary between the Belgian and French possessions.

In 1895 the number of the districts was increased to fifteen. Aruwimi-Uele was split into two districts: Uele with headquarters in Niangara, and Aruwimi District, still with headquarters in Basoko. Uele was threatened by the Arabs, and was placed under special administration. An 1897 map of the Congo Free State showed the Aruwimi District along the Aruwimi River to the south of Uellé District and to the north of the huge Stanley Falls District. The Aruwimi District had a long extension to the south of the Congo River along the west bank of the Lomami River, between the Stanley Falls District to the east and the Équateur District to the west.

== Belgian Congo ==
By 1910 the eastern arm of the district along the Aruwimi River had been absorbed into the Stanleyville District, apart from the lowest reaches, but to the south of the Congo River the district stretched south along both sides of the Lomami River. The district was bounded by the Bangala District to the northwest, Uele District to the northeast, Stanleyville District to the east, Kasai District to the southwest and Équateur District to the east. The Aruwimi District became part of the Orientale Province created in 1914. It disappeared with the reorganization of 1933, absorbed into the Stanleyville District in the new Stanleyville Province.

== Maps ==
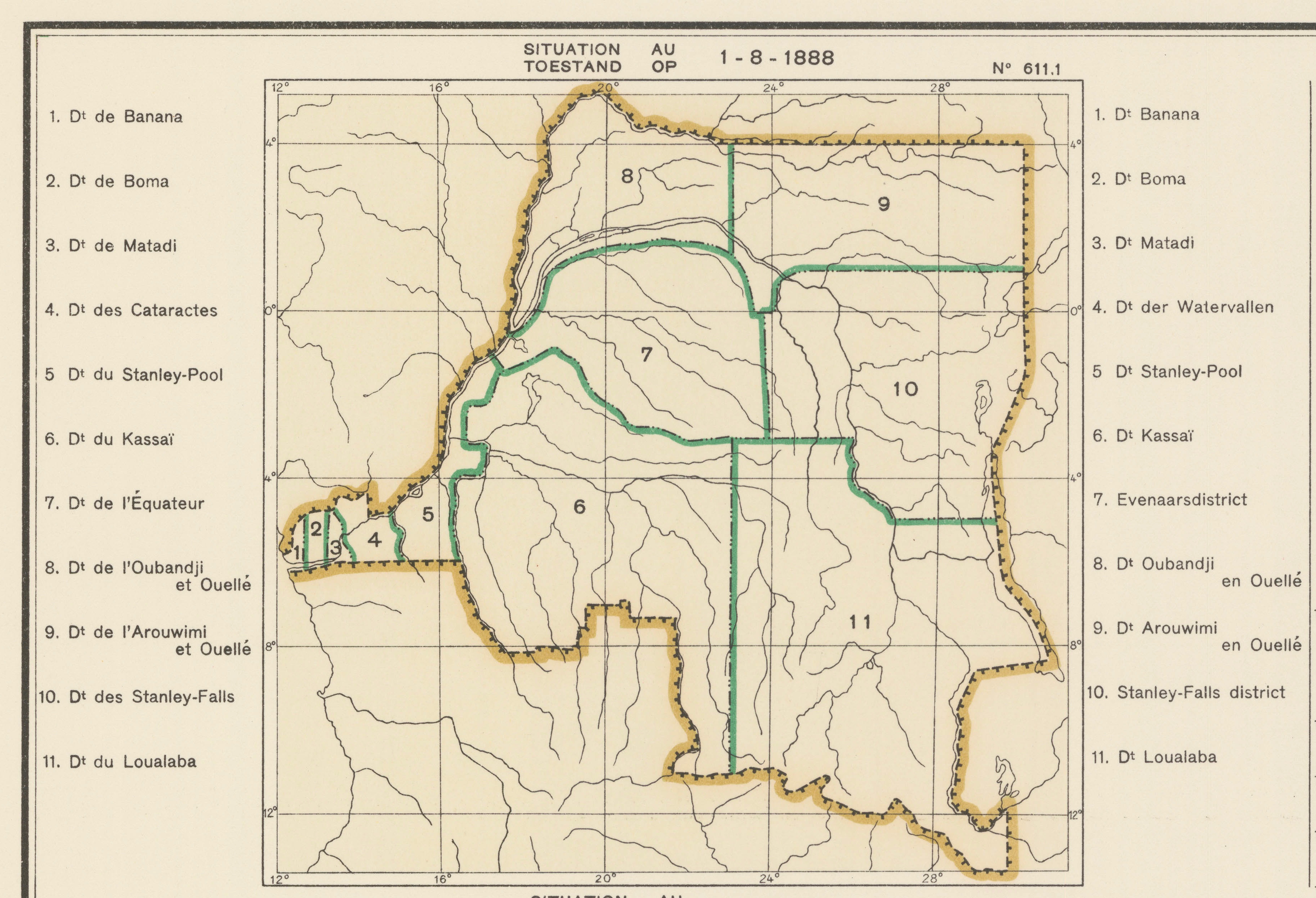
Districts of the Congo Free State in 1888. Aruwimi and Ouellé in Northeast

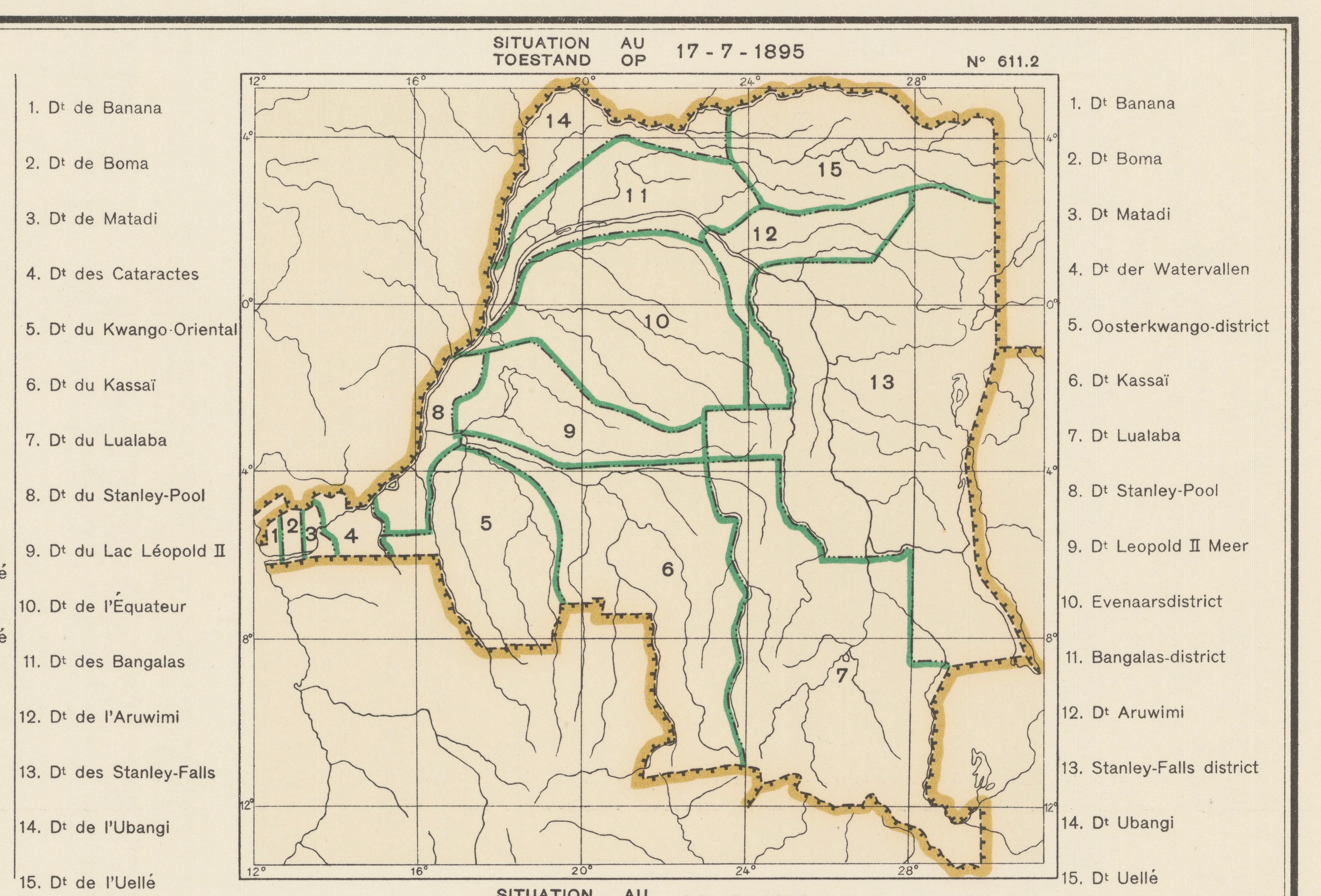
Districts of the Congo Free State in 1895. Aruwimi extends further south, Uellé District to the north.

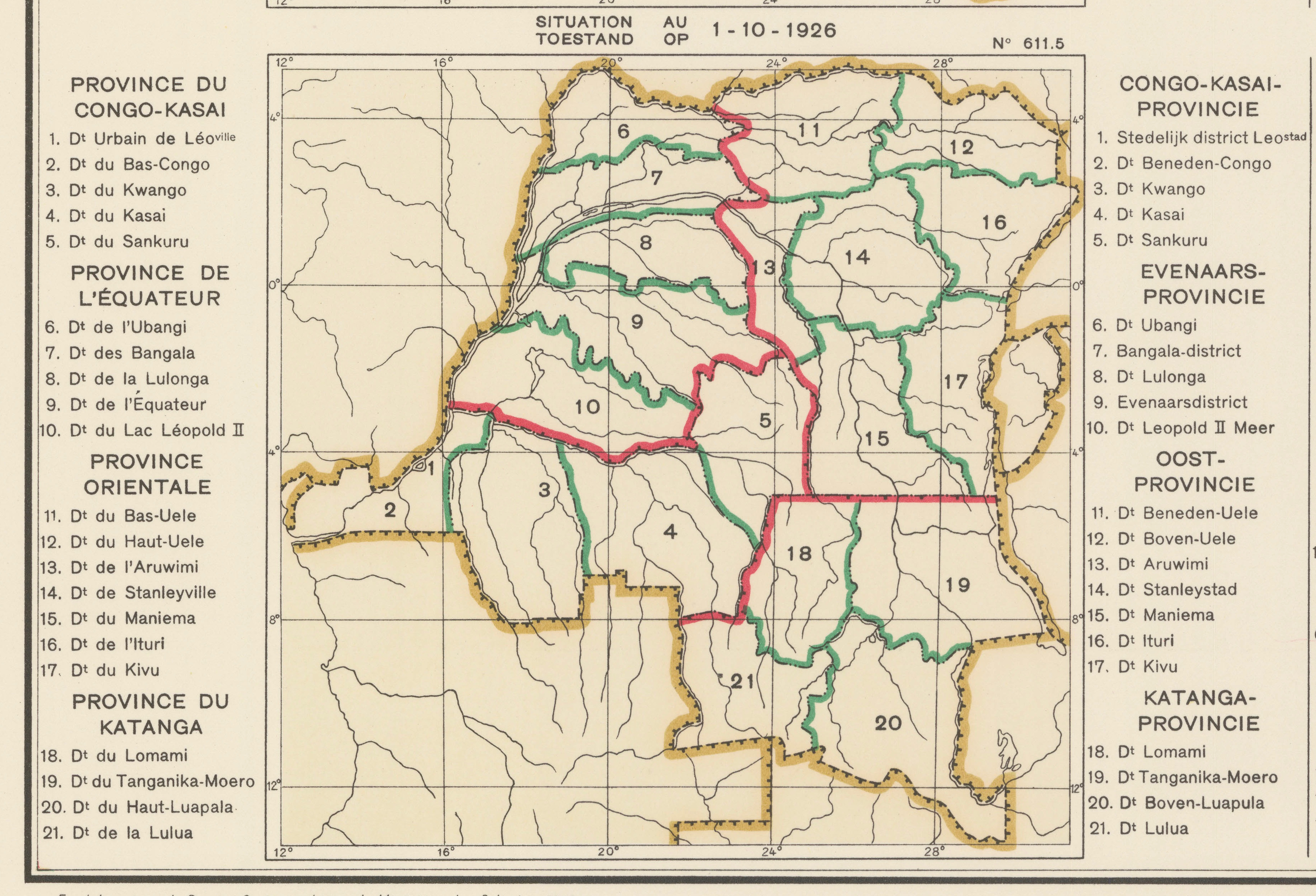
1926 provinces and districts. Eastern arm of Aruwimi absorbed by Stanleyville District

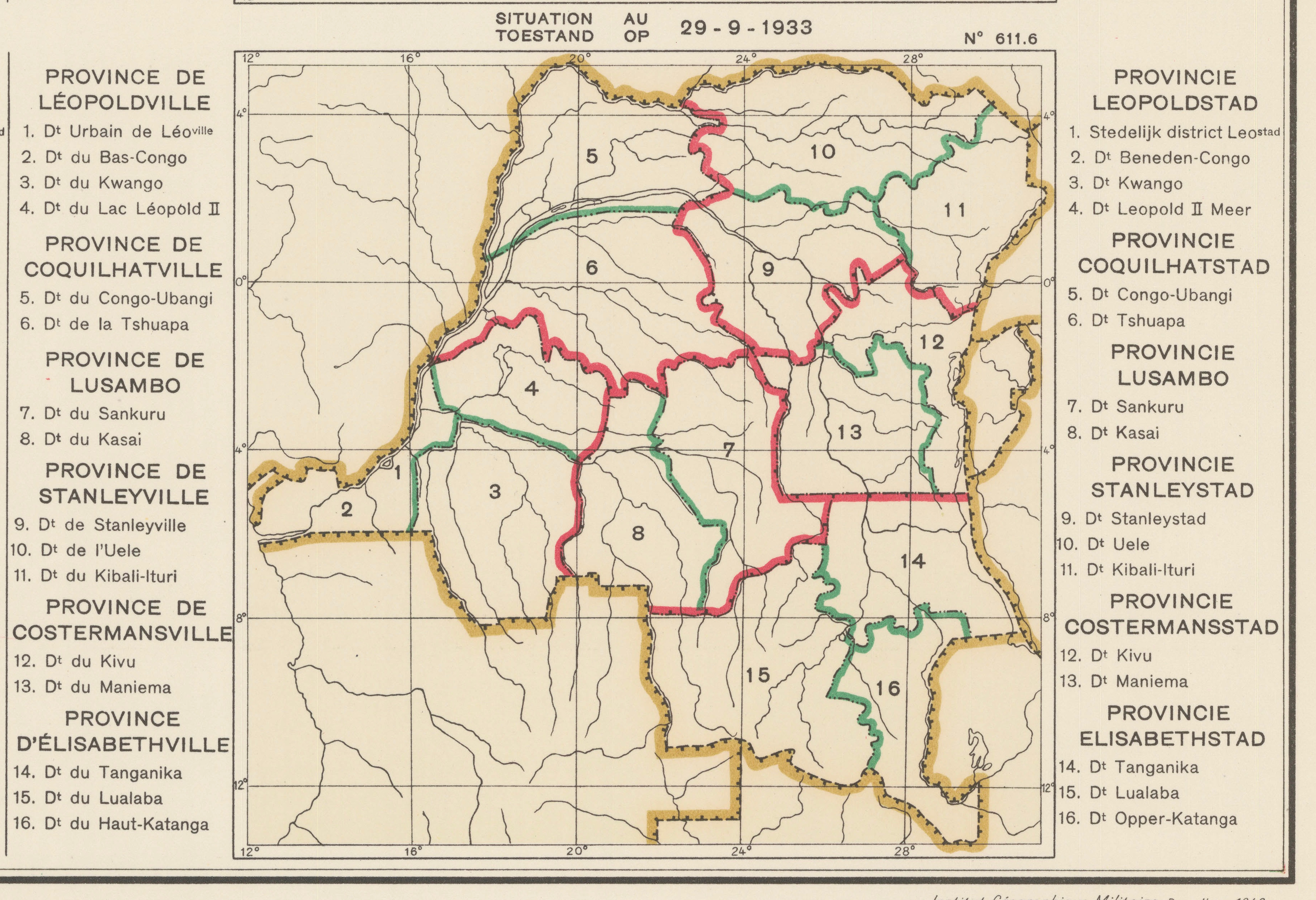
1933 provinces and districts. Remainder of Aruwimi absorbed by Stanleyville District

== See also ==
- Districts of the Congo Free State
- Districts of the Belgian Congo

== Sources ==
- Atlas général du Congo / Algemene atlas van Congo (in French and Dutch), Belgium: Institut Royal Colonial Belge, 1948–1963, OCLC 681334449
- Omasombo Tshonda, Jean (2014), Bas-Uele, Musée royal de l’Afrique centrale, ISBN 978-9-4916-1586-3
- Omasombo Tshonda, Jean (2015), Mongala : Jonction des territoires et bastion d'une identité supra-ethnique (PDF), Musée royal de l’Afrique centrale, ISBN 978-9-4922-4416-1
