= Lowa District =

- District
- Location within Democratic Republic of the Congo
- Coordinates: 1.421069°S 25.811712°E
- Country: Belgian Congo
- Province: Orientale
- District: Lowa

Lowa District (French: District de la Lowa, Dutch: District Lowa) was a district of the Belgian Congo. It was formed from part of Stanleyville District in 1914, and had been absorbed by Maniema District and Kivu District by 1926.

== Location ==
The district was named after the Lowa River shown on an 1897 map as entering the Congo from the east between Lokandu to the south and Ponthierville to the north. It was created by an arrêté royal of 28 March 1912, which divided the Congo into 22 districts.

A 1912 map shows that the large former Stanleyville District had been broken into a much smaller Stanleyville District and new Lowa, Maniema, Kivu and Ituri districts. Lowa District was border by Stanleyville District to the north, Kivu District to the west, Maniema District to the south and Aruwimi District to the west.

The Lowa District became part of the Orientale Province created in 1914, as shown in a 1914 map. It had disappeared by 1926, absorbed into the Kivu District and Maniema District.

== Maps ==
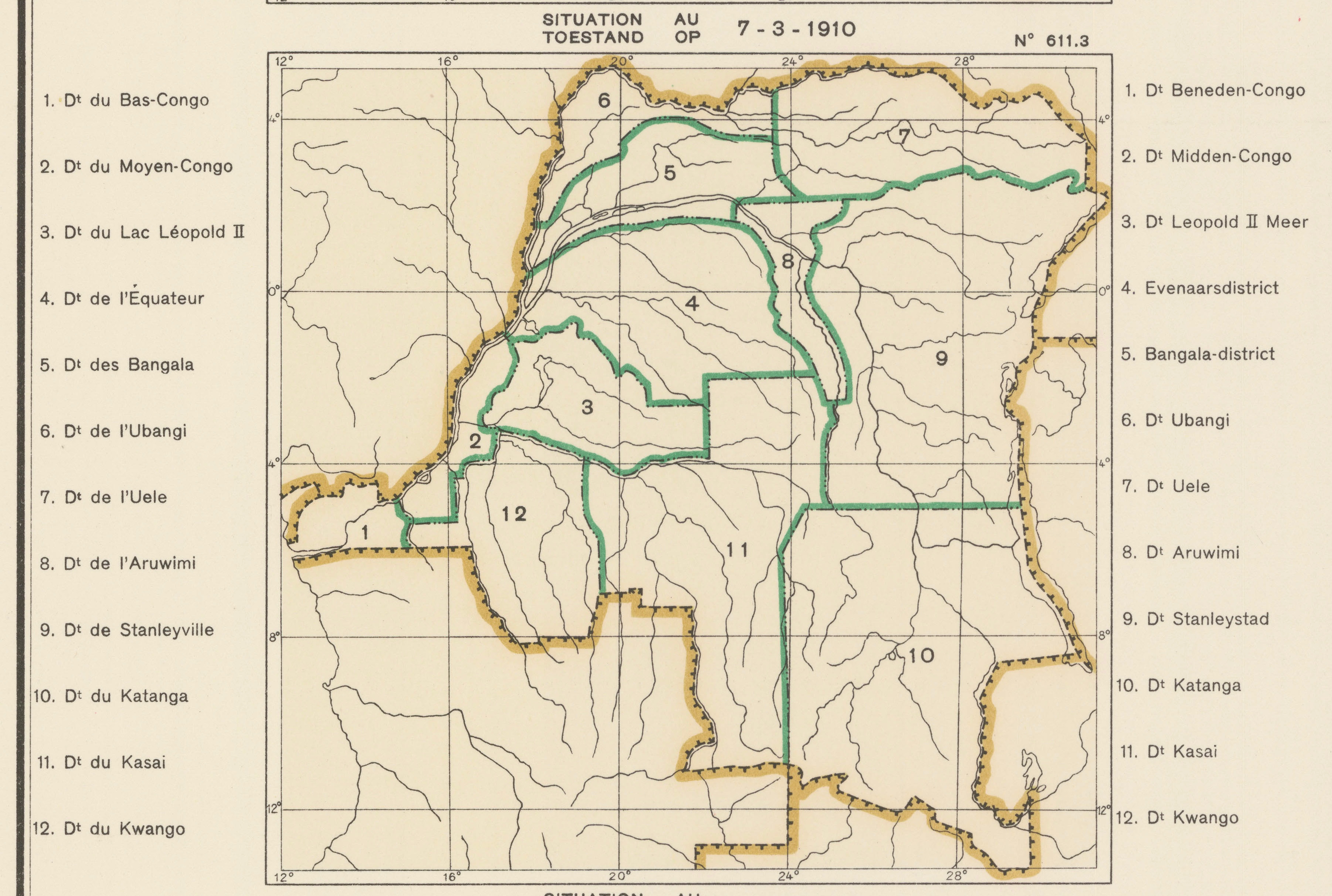
1910 provinces and districts

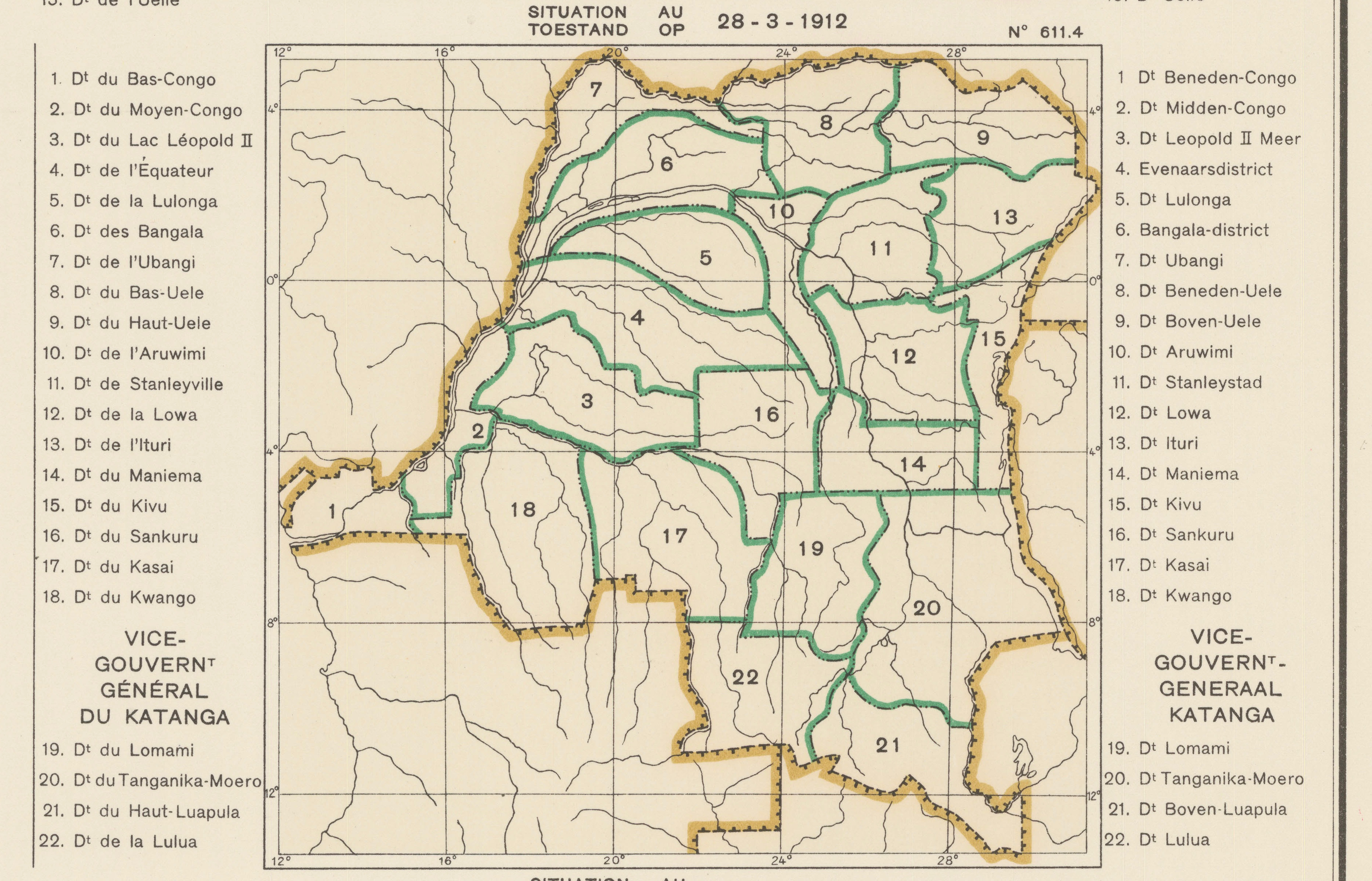
1912 provinces and districts

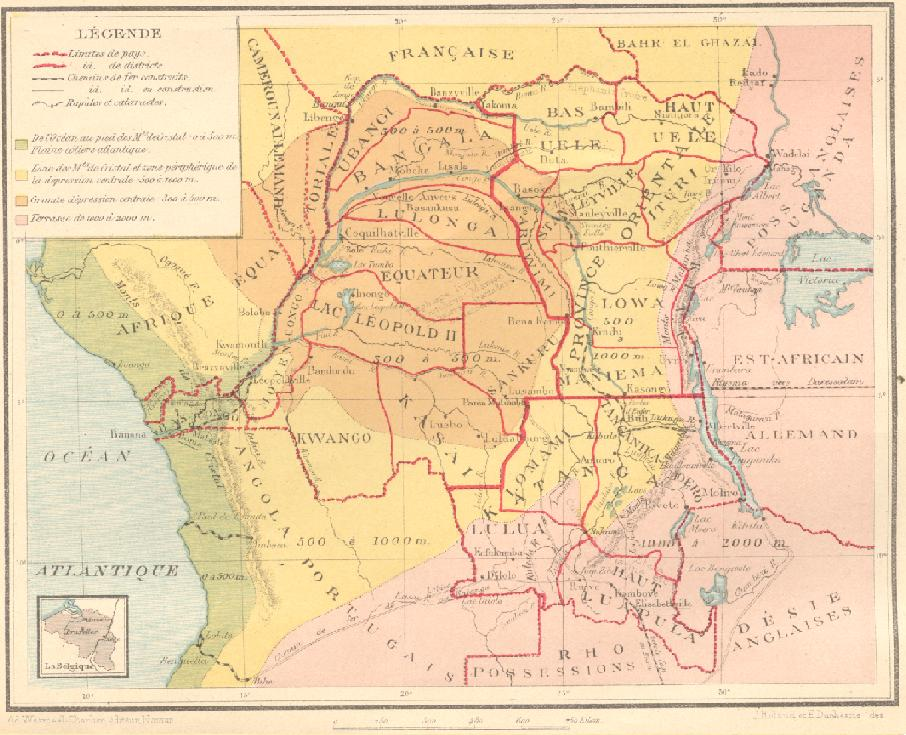
1914 districts

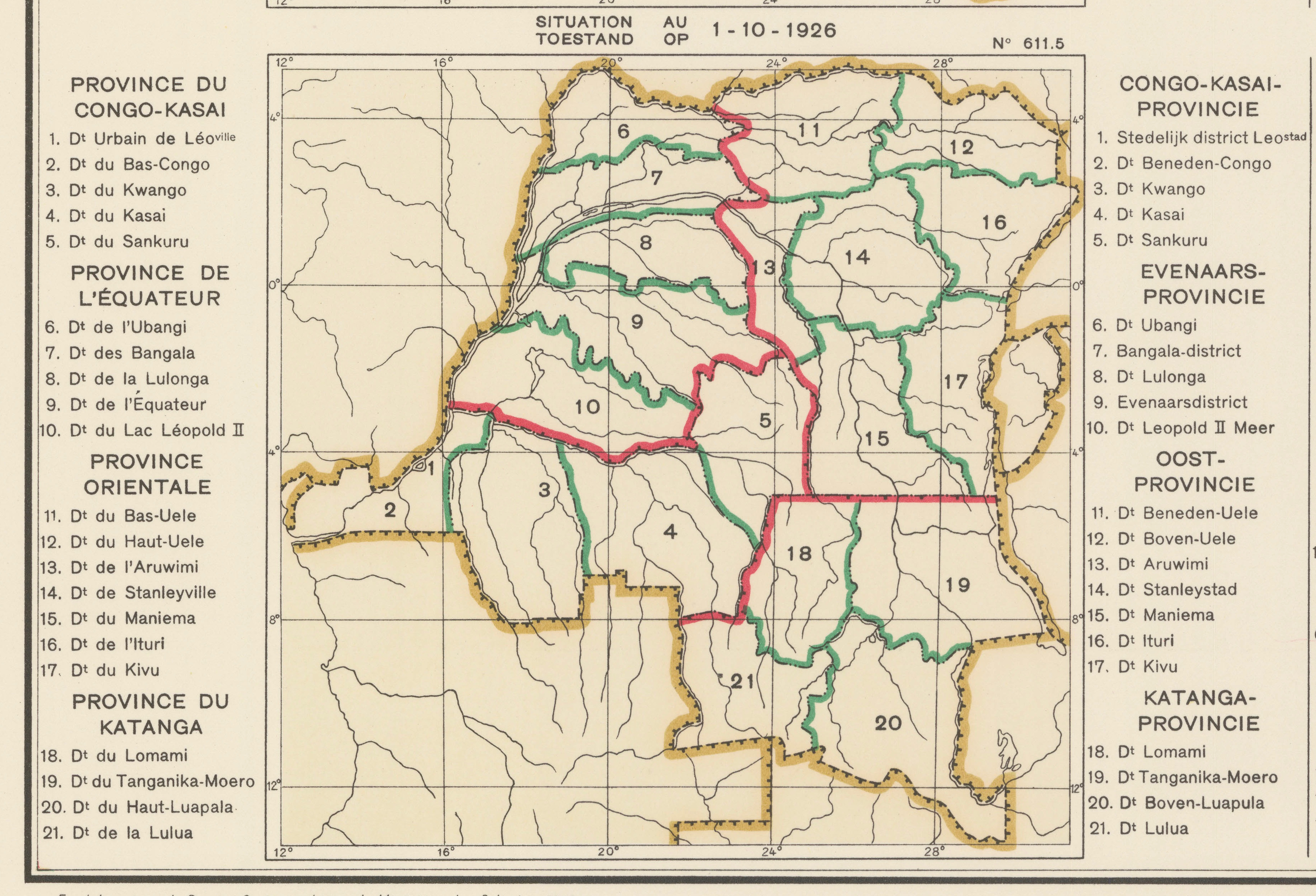
1926 provinces and districts

== See also ==
- Districts of the Belgian Congo

== Sources ==
- Atlas général du Congo / Algemene atlas van Congo (in French and Dutch), Belgium: Institut Royal Colonial Belge, 1948–1963, OCLC 681334449 / http://www.kaowarsom.be/en/online_maps
- Lemarchand, René (1988), Political Awakening in the Belgian Congo, University of California Press, GGKEY:TQ2J84FWCXN
- Omasombo Tshonda, Jean (2015), Mongala : Jonction des territoires et bastion d'une identité supra-ethnique (PDF), Musée royal de l’Afrique centrale, ISBN 978-9-4922-4416-1
- Roland, J.; Duchesne, E. (1914), "Congo Belge, Administrative (1914)", Le Congo Belge, Namur: Wesmael-Charlier
