= Uélé Province =

Former province of the Democratic Republic of the Congo

Bas-Uélé

Haut-Uélé

Uélé Province is a former province of the Democratic Republic of the Congo. It was formed in 1963 from part of Orientale Province. In 1966 it was merged back into the reconstituted Orientale Province. It roughly corresponds to the modern provinces of Bas-Uélé and Haut-Uélé.

== Region ==
The province took its name from the Uélé River. The Uélé region was once home to assimilating kingdoms (not Bantu), which however left only a scattered settlements. Bas-Uélé is the domain of the Zande people, and Haut-Uélé the domain of the Mangbetu people. In recent times, Haut-Uélé has been exploited for gold mining.

== Administration ==
The heads of Uélé Province were:

Start	End	Officeholder	Title
11 September 1962	May 1965	Paul Mambaya	President
6 July 1965	28 December 1966	François Kupa	Governor

== Sources ==
- Bruneau, Jean-Claude (30 June 2009), "Les nouvelles provinces de la République Démocratique du Congo : construction territoriale et ethnicités", L'Espace Politique, 7 (2009–1), doi:10.4000/espacepolitique.1296
