= Haut-Congo Province =

- Former province
- Coordinates: 0°31′N 25°12′E
- Country: Republic of the Congo (Léopoldville)

Haut-Congo Province was a province of the Republic of the Congo (Léopoldville), now the Democratic Republic of the Congo. It was formed in April 1962 from part of the Orientale Province. In 1966 it was merged back into the reconstituted Orientale Province.

== Location ==
"Haut Congo" means "Upper Congo", and refers to the province's location on the upper reaches of the Congo River.

== History ==
Haut-Congo Province was formed on 27 April 1962 from part of the Orientale Province, the other parts becoming Ituri Province (later Kibali Ituri) and Uele Province. On 28 December 1966 the Orientale Province was reconstituted.

== Presidents and governors ==
The heads of Haut-Congo Province were:

Start	End	Officeholder	Title
March 1963	8 September 1963	Marcel Tshishiku	Extraordinary commissioner
June 1963	26 June 1963	Georges Grenfell (b. 1908)	President
26 June 1963	1964	Paul Isombuma	President
1964	5 August 1964	François Aradjabu	Extraordinary commissioner-general for the former province of Haut-Congo
16 September 1964	November 1964	Alphonse Abikwa	President
November 1964	5 November 1966	Ignace Michel Alamazani	President (from 1965, governor)
5 November 1966	28 December 1966	Pierre Efomi	Governor

== Sources ==
- "Congo (Kinshasa) Provinces", Rulers.org
- Kisangani, Emizet Francois; Bobb, Scott F. (1 October 2009), Historical Dictionary of the Democratic Republic of the Congo, Scarecrow Press, ISBN 978-0-8108-6325-5
