= Kivu Province =

Province in the Belgian Congo

Coordinates: 2.004944°S 27.754781°E

Belgian Congo provinces in 1947

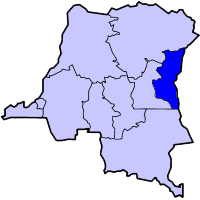
North and South Kivu

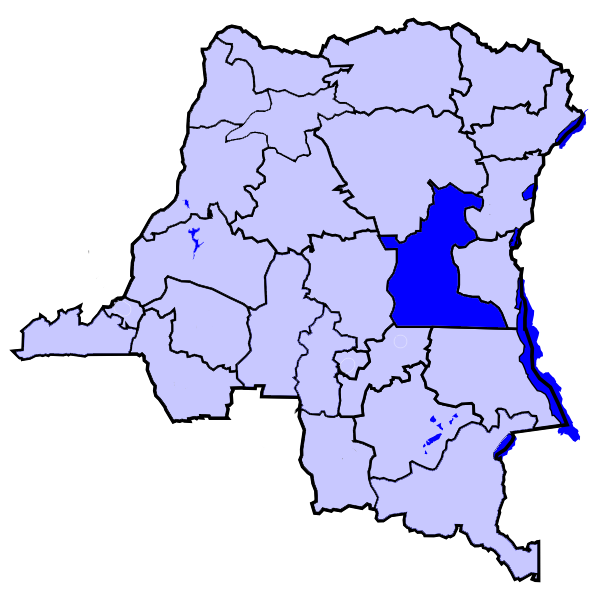
Maniemi

Kivu Province was a province in the Belgian Congo, originally called Costermansville Province, that was formed in 1933 from part of the old Orientale Province. The Republic of the Congo (Léopoldville) became independent in 1960, and between 1962 and 1966 the province was temporarily broken into the provinces of Maniema, North Kivu and South Kivu. In 1988 it was again broken into these provinces.

== Location ==
Kivu is the name of the entire region surrounding Lake Kivu, including the portions in Rwanda which contain the vast majority of the lake area's population

== History ==
On 25 September 1933, the provinces of the Belgian Congo were reorganized, and the amount of autonomy of the former provinces was reduced. The new provinces took the name of their capital, with the Orientale Province being split into Stanleyville Province and Costermansville Province. Costermansville Province was renamed Kivu Province on 1 October 1947. It was broken into the provinces of Maniema, North Kivu and South Kivu from 10 May 1962 to 28 December 1966, then reunited. In 1988 it was again broken up into the provinces of Maniema, North Kivu and South Kivu.

== See also ==
- List of governors of Kivu

== Sources ==
- Bruneau, Jean-Claude (30 June 2009), "Les nouvelles provinces de la République Démocratique du Congo : construction territoriale et ethnicités", L'Espace Politique, 7 (2009–1), doi:10.4000/espacepolitique.1296
