= Orientale Province =

Orientale Province Province Orientale
- Province
- Belgian Congo provinces in 1920

- Orientale from 1933
- Country: Democratic Republic of the Congo
- Capital: Kisangani

Area
  - Total: 503,239 km^{2} (194,302 sq mi)

Population (2010 est.)
  - Total: 8,197,975
  - Density: 16.2904/km^{2} (42.1920/sq mi)
- Official language: French
- National language: Swahili, Lingala, Pa-Zande (Zande language)

Orientale Province (French: Province orientale, lit. 'Eastern province') is one of the former provinces of the Democratic Republic of the Congo and its predecessors the Congo Free State and the Belgian Congo. It went through a series of boundary changes between 1898 and 2015, when it was divided into smaller units.

The District of Orientale Province was created from Stanley Falls District on 15 July 1898. The district was expanded to become Orientale Province in 1913. It was divided in 1933 into Costermansville (later Kivu) and Stanleyville Province. Stanleyville Province was renamed Orientale Province from 1947 to 1963, when it was broken up into Kibali-Ituri, Uélé and Haut-Congo provinces. Orientale Province was reconstituted in 1966. Between 1971 and 1997 it was called Haut-Zaïre, then it returned to the name of Orientale. The province contained the Bas-Uele, Haut-Uele, Ituri and Tshopo districts. These were elevated to provinces in 2015 under the 2006 constitution.

The province lay in the northeast of the country. Originally it bordered Équateur to the west, Congo-Kasaï to the southwest and Katanga to the south. After being reduced in size, it bordered Équateur to the west, Kasaï-Oriental province to the southwest, Maniema to the south, and North Kivu to the southeast. It also bordered the Central African Republic and South Sudan to the north, and Uganda to the east. The provincial capital was Stanleyville, later renamed Kisangani.

== History ==
On 15 July 1898 the Stanley Falls District became the District of Orientale Province (District de la province Orientale), with Stanleyville as its headquarters. The Lualaba District in the south was split off at this time. The district was also called Stanleyville District. In 1910 the new vice-government general of Katanga was formed the south, with parts of Lualaba District and parts of Stanleyville.

Orientale/Oost Province was formed in 1913 in the Belgian Congo from the District of Orientale Province, expanded to include Haut-Uélé, Bas-Uélé and Aruwimi. The new province contained the districts of Bas-Uele, Haut-Uele, Ituri, Stanleyville, Aruwimi, Maniema, Lowa and Kivu. It was divided in 1933 into Costermansville (later Kivu) and Stanleyville Province. Stanleyville Province was renamed Orientale/Oost Province from 1947 to 1963, when it was broken up into Kibali-Ituri, Uélé and Haut-Congo provinces. Orientale Province was reconstituted in 1966 from the amalgamation of the Uele, Kibali-Ituri and Haut-Congo provinces. In 2015 it was dissolved into the provinces of Bas-Uélé, Haut-Uélé, Ituri and Tshopo.

In 1998 the Orientale villages of Durba and Watsa were the center of an outbreak of Marburg virus disease among gold mine workers.

The Ituri district of Orientale was the scene of the Ituri conflict.

As of 2014, militia groups continue to fight in the province and have reportedly committed many atrocities against the local population, such as forcing women into sex slavery and forcing men to work in mines.

== Approximate correspondence between historical divisions and current provinces ==
Approximate correspondence between historical and current province
Belgian Congo				Republic of the Congo		Zaire		Democratic Republic of the Congo	
1908 8 districts	1913 1 province	1932 1 province	1947 1 province	1963 3 provinces	1966 1 province	1971 1 province	1988 1 province	1997 1 province	2015 4 provinces
Bas-Uele	Orientale	Stanleyville	Orientale	Uélé	Orientale	Haut-Zaïre		Orientale	Bas-Uélé
Haut-Uele	Orientale	Stanleyville	Orientale	Uélé	Orientale	Haut-Zaïre		Orientale	Haut-Uélé
Ituri	Orientale	Stanleyville	Orientale	Kibali-Ituri	Orientale	Haut-Zaïre		Orientale	Ituri
Stanleyville	Orientale	Stanleyville	Orientale	Haut-Congo	Orientale	Haut-Zaïre		Orientale	Tshopo
Aruwimi	Orientale	Stanleyville	Orientale	Haut-Congo	Orientale	Haut-Zaïre		Orientale	Tshopo
Maniema	Orientale	(Costermansville, Kivu and successors)							
Lowa	Orientale	(Costermansville, Kivu and successors)							
Kivu	Orientale	(Costermansville, Kivu and successors)							

== Divisions ==
The province was divided into the city of Kisangani and the districts of Bas-Uele, Haut-Uele, Ituri and Tshopo. Cities and towns, with their 2010 populations, are:

Name	District	Territory	Pop. 2010	Coordinates
Aketi	Bas-Uele District	Aketi Territory	40,507	2°44′N 23°47′E
Ango	Bas-Uele District	Ango Territory	8,381	4°02′N 25°52′E
Aru	Ituri District	Aru Territory	29,801	2°52′N 30°51′E
Bafwasende	Tshopo District	Bafwasende Territory	14,504	1°05′N 27°16′E
Bambesa	Bas-Uele District	Bambesa Territory	14,959	3°28′N 25°43′E
Basoko	Tshopo District	Basoko Territory	50,352	1°14′N 23°35′E
Bondo	Bas-Uele District	Bondo Territory	18,118	3°49′N 23°40′E
Bunia	Ituri District	Irumu Territory	327,837	1°34′N 30°14′E
Buta	Bas-Uele District	Buta Territory	53,401	2°49′N 24°44′E
Djugu	Ituri District	Djugu Territory	27,112	1°55′N 30°30′E
Dungu	Haut-Uele District	Dungu Territory	26,894	3°37′N 28°34′E
Irumu	Ituri District	Irumu Territory	10,387	1°27′N 29°52′E
Isiro	Haut-Uele District	Rungu Territory	174,551	2°46′N 27°37′E
Kisangani	(city)	(city)	868,672	0°32′N 25°11′E
Kituku	Ituri District	Irumu Territory	43,460	1°06′N 29°58′E
Mahagi	Ituri District	Mahagi Territory	18,743	2°18′N 30°59′E
Mongbwalu	Ituri District	Djugu Territory	29,672	1°57′N 30°02′E
Niangara	Haut-Uele District	Niangara Territory	13,504	3°42′N 27°52′E
Opala	Tshopo District	Opala Territory	15,569	1°17′N 27°16′E
Poko	Bas-Uele District	Poko Territory	10,873	3°09′N 26°53′E
Ubundu	Tshopo District	Ubundu Territory	13,332	0°21′S 25°29′E
Wamba	Haut-Uele District	Wamba Territory	17,651	2°08′N 27°59′E
Watsa	Haut-Uele District	Watsa Territory	31,978	3°02′N 29°32′E
Yahuma	Tshopo District	Yahuma Territory	4,857	1°05′N 23°13′E
Yangambi	Tshopo District	Isangi Territory	40,932	0°46′N 24°26′E

== See also ==
- List of governors of Orientale Province
- Kisangani history and timeline

== Bibliography ==
- Auzias, Dominique; Labourdette, Jean-Paul (2006). Congo: république démocratique. Petit Futé. ISBN 2-7469-1412-3.
- Gwillim Law (1999). "Democratic Republic of the Congo". Administrative Subdivisions of Countries: A Comprehensive World Reference, 1900 through 1998. US: McFarland & Company. pp. 92–94. ISBN 0786407298.
- Lemarchand, René (1964), Political Awakening in the Belgian Congo, University of California Press, GGKEY:TQ2J84FWCXN, archived from the original on 21 May 2024
