= Versfeld =

Surname list

Versfeld is a surname. Notable people with the surname include:

- Berry Versfeld (born 1943), South African cricketer
- Cornelis (Kees) Versfeld (born 1948), Canadian oil sands energy management and natural gas manager
- Hasie Versfeld (1866–1944), South African rugby union player
- Mark Versfeld (born 1976), Canadian swimmer
- Marthinus Versfeld (1909–1995), South African philosopher
- Oupa Versfeld (1860–1931), South African rugby union player
- Madison Versfeld (2004),

World Champion Tap Dancer

- Taylor-Lee Versfeld (1996),

World Champion Tap Dancer

- Robynne Versfeld (1994),

World Champion Dancer

== See also ==
- Loftus Versfeld Stadium, stadium in Pretoria, South Africa
