= Haut-Uele District =

- District
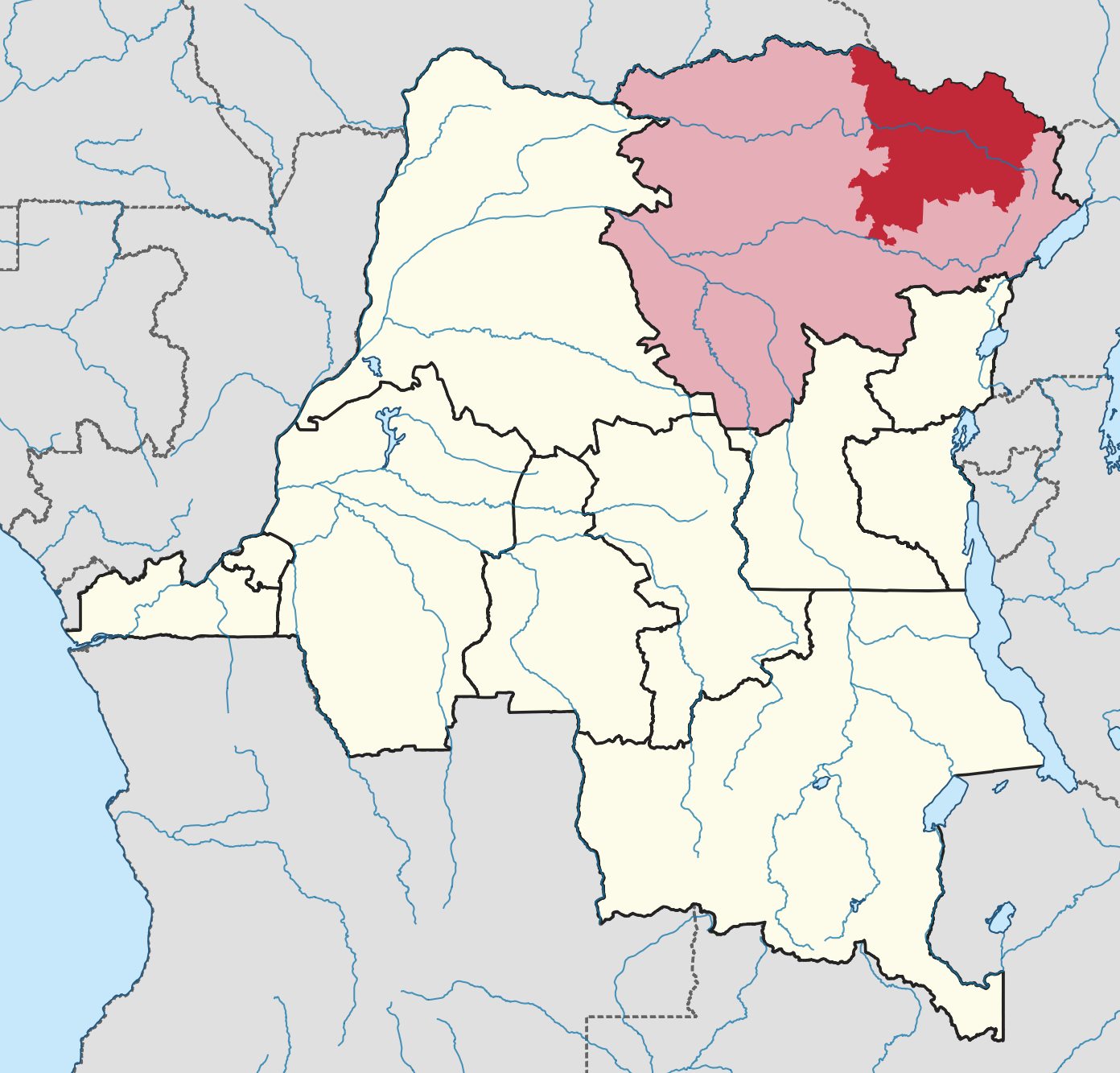
- Haut-Uele district of Orientale province (2014)
- Coordinates: 2.776394°N 27.617911°E
- Country: Democratic Republic of the Congo
- Province: Orientale
- District: Haut-Uele

Haut-Uele District (French: District du Haut-Uele, Dutch: District Boven-Uele) was a district of the Belgian Congo and the Democratic Republic of the Congo. It was formed from part of Uele District in 1912. It roughly corresponded in area to the present Haut-Uélé province.

== Location ==
Haut-Uele District (Upper Uele District) was named after the Uele River, and covers the upper part of the river basin.

== Belgian Congo ==
The Haut-Uele District was created by an arrêté royal of 28 March 1912, which divided the Congo into 22 districts. A 1912 map shows that the former Uele District had been broken into the Haut-Uele and Bas-Uele (Lower Uele) districts. Haut-Uele was bordered by French territory to the north, British territory to the east, Ituri and Stanleyville districts to the south and Bas-Uele to the west. The Haut-Uele District became part of the Orientale Province created in 1913.

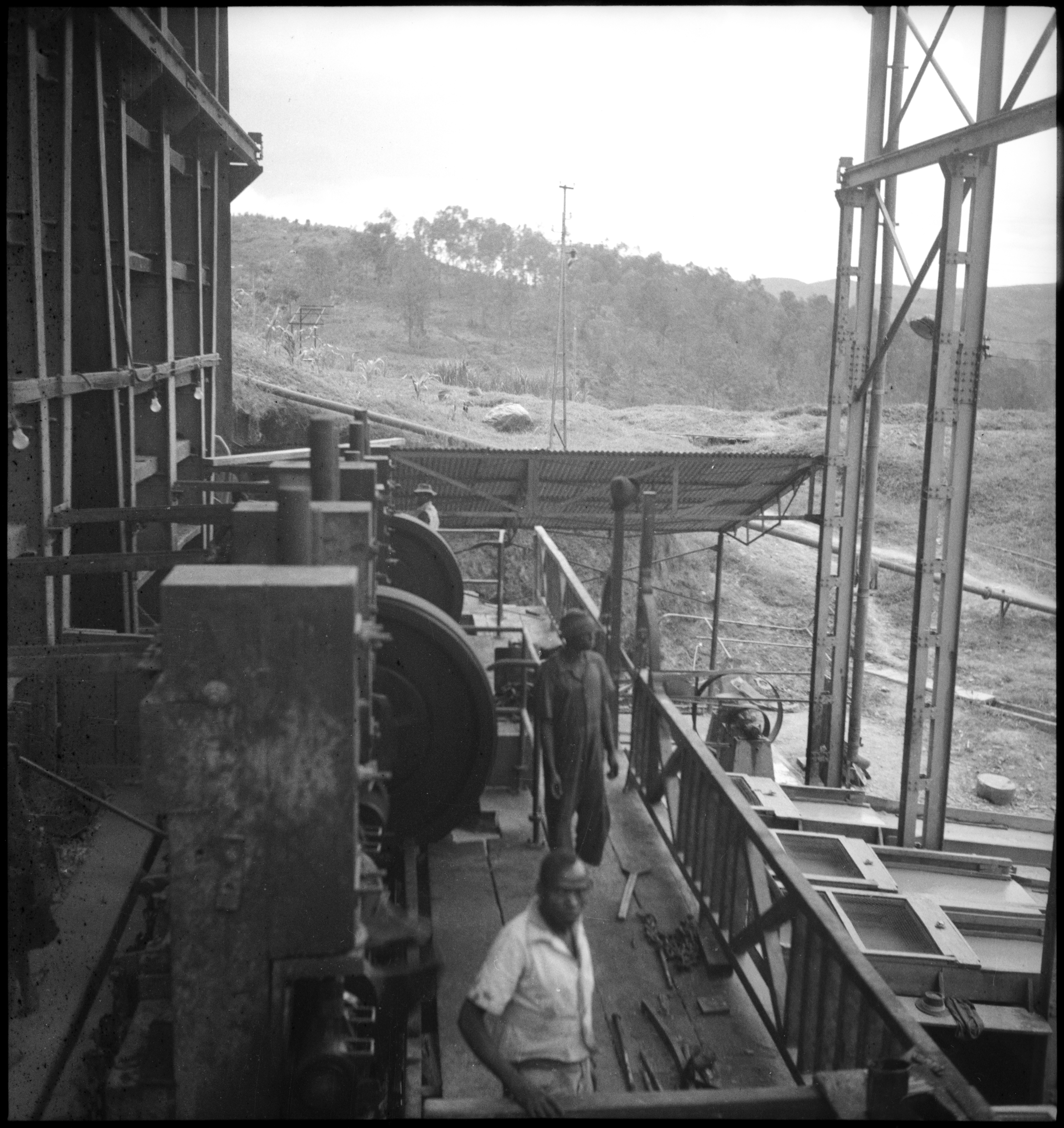
Two miners in Kilo-Moto c. 1941

Kilo-Moto is a region in the far northeast corner of the Democratic Republic of the Congo (DRC) where gold was discovered in the Ituri River by government prospectors in 1903. Moto is in the Haut-Uélé Province and Kilo in the Ituri Province. The Kilo mine was opened in 1905 and the Moto mine in 1911. Gold was also extracted by panning the river gravels. In 1919 the government created the Régie Industrielle des Mines de Kilo-Moto, an autonomous body. At the end of 1919 Louis Franck, the Minister of the Colonies, gave Georges Moulaert, former governor of Équateur Province, responsibility for the Kilo-Moto state mines. These were located in largely hostile territory, with no communications and very primitive operations.

Moulaert tackled improvements to roads, transport, medical support, supplies and crops, as well as mining installations, exploitation of alluvium and eluvium deposits, prospecting and research. Between 1920 and 1924 the company built 828 kilometres (514 mi) of roads, with many metal bridges, and installed 345 kilometres (214 mi) of telegraph and telephone lines. In 1924 a 1,500 horsepower (1,100 kW) hydroelectric power station was inaugurated at Soleniana and the grinding plant was electrified. Due to poor transport across the Congo region, particularly the Matadi-Léopoldville Railway, the company developed a route from the Uele River to the Nile to transport cotton, coffee and other products of the region.

In 1926 the Régie was converted into a commercial company, the Société des Mines d’Or de Kilo-Moto. Hydroelectric stations were built to power the crushing plants, and by 1930 the two mines, but mostly Kilo, were producing almost 5,000 kilograms (11,000 lb) annually. Moulaert was made chairman of the board. He continued to head the company until 1947. Moulaert boosted gold production at Kilo-Moto, but his methods were questioned, particularly forced recruitment of Black workers, who totaled 10,012 in 1918 and over 40,000 in 1939. Alexis Bertrand wrote a 1932 report that strongly criticized the practices at the Kilo-Moto gold mines. The report said from 35% to 50% of able bodied adult men were forced to leave their homes to work the gold deposits, far above the official limit of 10% set by the Manpower Commission. This caused public controversy. Moulaert strongly defended "his" company, but criticism continued into the 1940s.

With the 1933 reorganization Bas-Uele and Haut-Uele were again combined into Uele District, and lay in the new Stanleyville Province. By 1954 Stanleyville Province had been renamed Orientale Province, and Uele District had again been split into Bas-Uele and Haut-Uele districts. A 1955–1957 map shows Haut-Uele District bordered by French territory to the north, Ituri District to the southeast, Stanleyville District to the southwest and Bas-Uele District to the west. The area was 89,700 square kilometres (34,600 sq mi) out of a total of 503,200 square kilometres (194,300 sq mi) for Orientale Province as a whole.

== Post-independence ==
On 27 July 1962 the administration of Orientale Province was taken over by the central government. It was divided into the new provinces of Kibali-Ituri, Uélé and Haut-Congo. On 28 December 1966 Orientale Province was reunited.

The Durba Mine is a gold mine in the Haut-Uele Province of the Democratic Republic of the Congo, within the Kilo-Moto greenstone belt. As of 2011 a joint venture between AngloGold Ashanti and Randgold Resources was actively developing the Kibali Gold Mine concession centered on this mine. Between 1998 and 2000, co-circulating Marburg virus and Ravn virus caused 154 cases of Marburg virus disease and 128 deaths among illegal gold miners in Durba and nearby Watsa.

The 2008 Christmas massacres took place on 24–27 December 2008, when the Lord's Resistance Army (LRA), a Ugandan rebel group, attacked several villages in Haut-Uele District. The Makombo massacre took place from 14 to 17 December 2009 in the village and region of Makombo in the Haut-Uele district. Human Rights Watch (HRW) believes the attacks, which killed 321 people, were perpetrated by the Lord's Resistance Army (LRA), which denied responsibility.

In 2015 Orientale Province was broken up into the provinces of Bas-Uélé, Haut-Uélé, Ituri and Tshopo.

== Maps ==
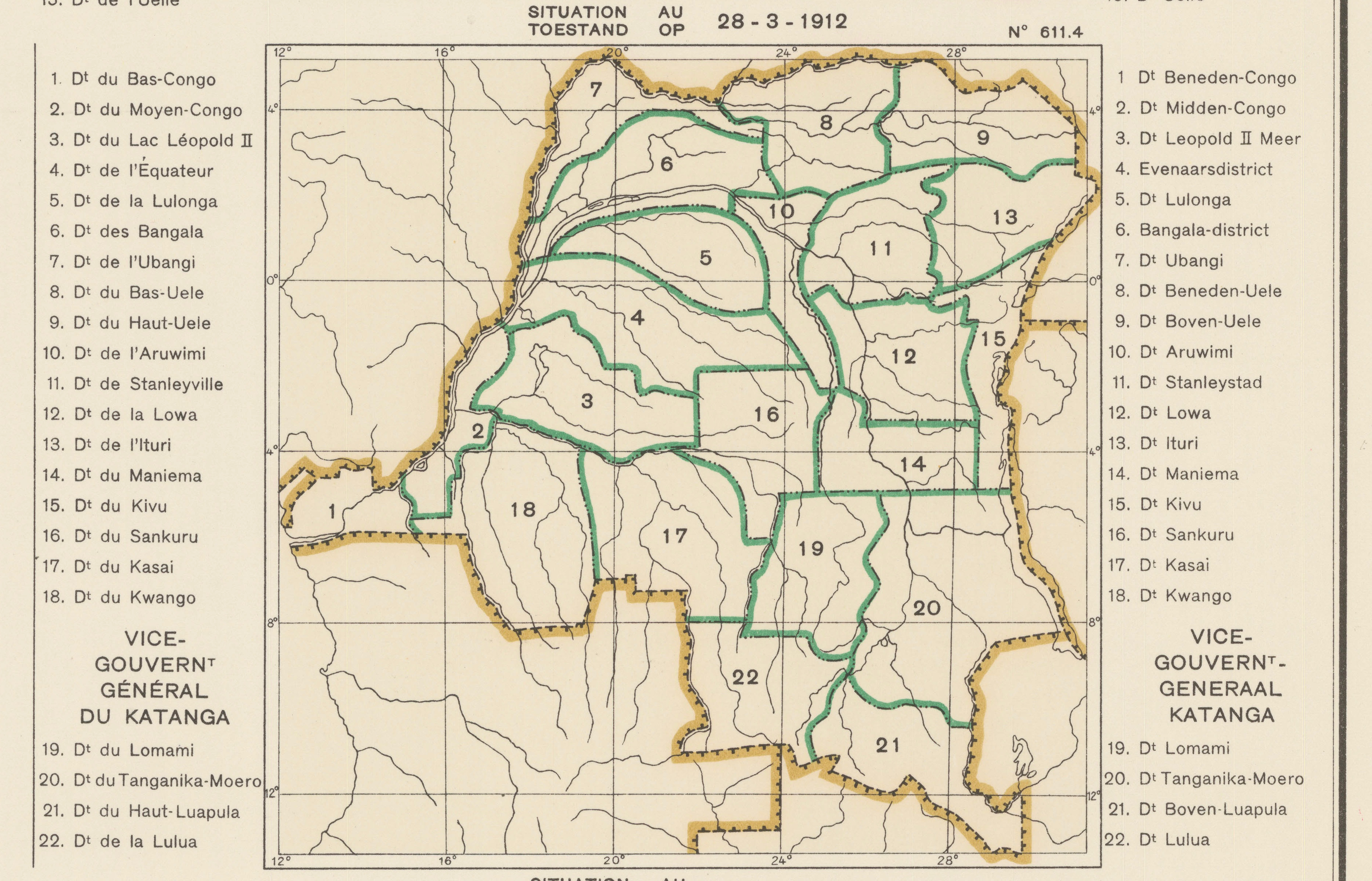
1912 provinces and districts. Haut-Uele in northeast corner.

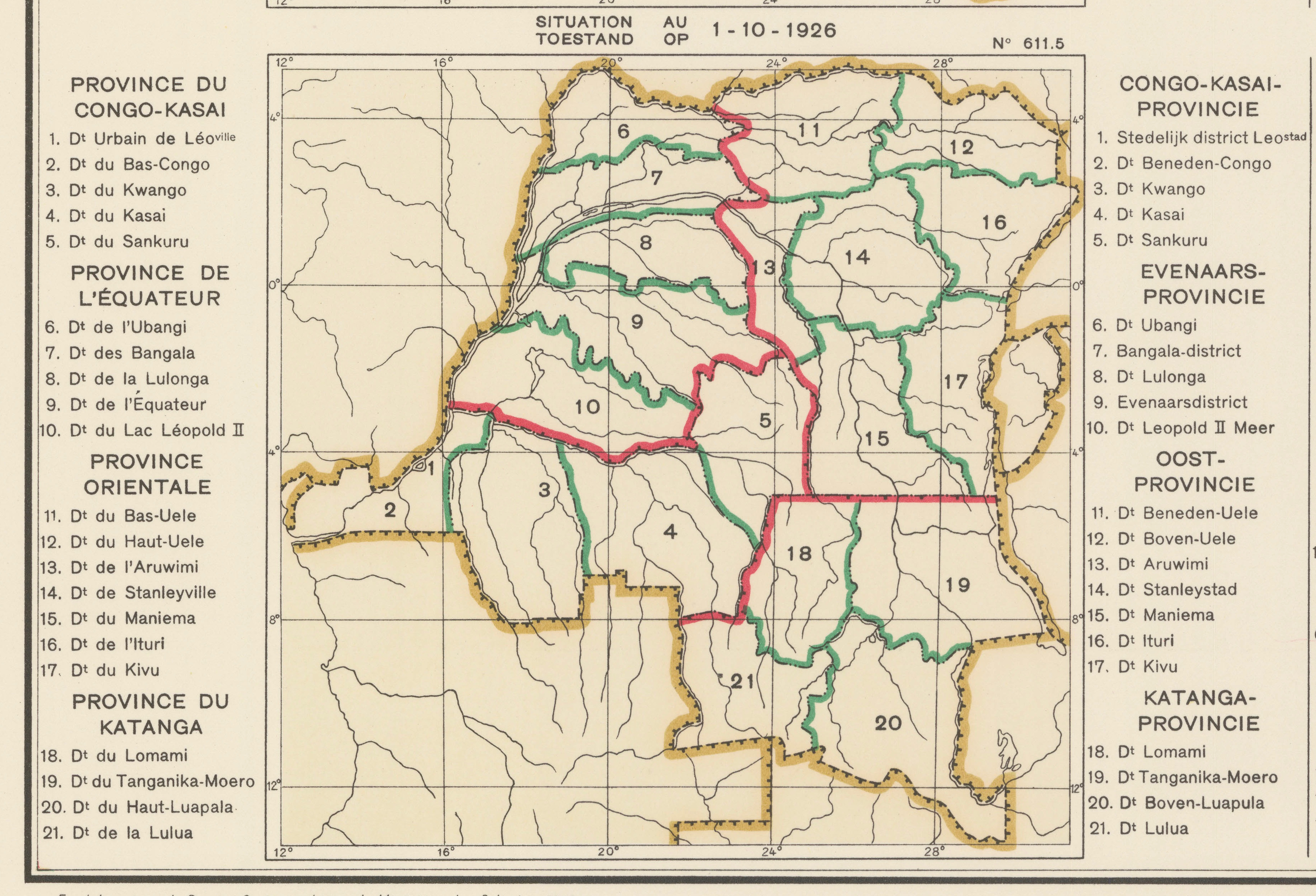
1926 provinces and districts. Some boundary refinements

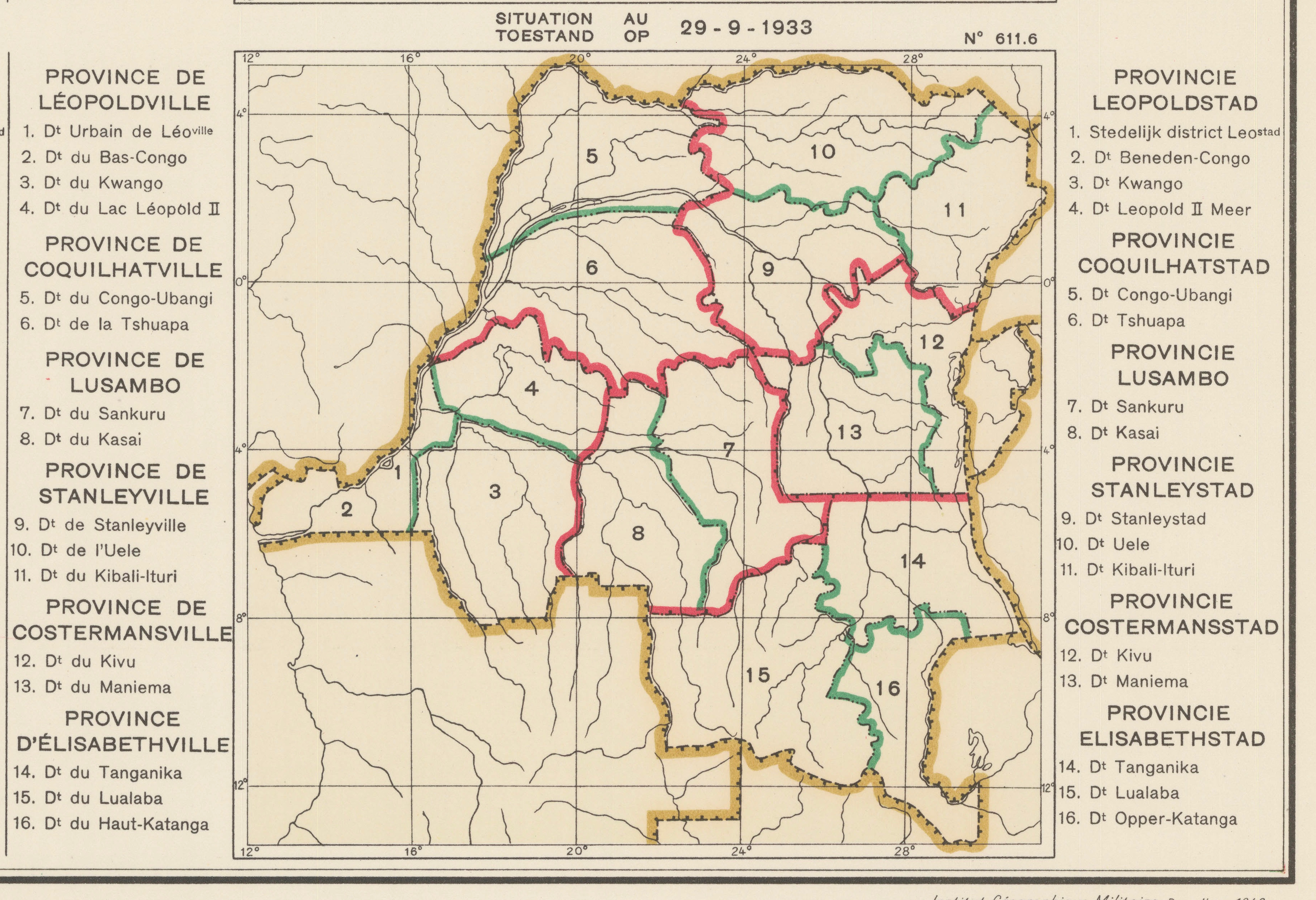
1933 provinces and districts. Haut-Uele divided between Uele and Kibali-Ituri

The current Haut-Uélé province

== See also ==
- Districts of the Belgian Congo

== Sources ==
- Agayo Bakonzi (1982). "The Archives of the Gold Mines of Kilo-Moto". History in Africa. 9: 355–358. doi:10.2307/3171617. JSTOR 3171617.
- Atlas général du Congo / Algemene atlas van Congo (in French and Dutch), Belgium: Institut Royal Colonial Belge, 1948–1963, OCLC 681334449
- Bausch, D. G.; Nichol, S. T.; Muyembe-Tamfum, J. J.; Borchert, M.; et al. (2006). "Marburg Hemorrhagic Fever Associated with Multiple Genetic Lineages of Virus" (PDF). New England Journal of Medicine. 355 (9): 909–919. doi:10.1056/NEJMoa051465. PMID 16943403.
- Brass, William (8 December 2015), Demography of Tropical Africa, Princeton University Press, ISBN 978-1-4008-7714-0
- "Congo (Kinshasa) Provinces", Rulers.org
- Kennedy, Elizabeth A. (31 December 2008), Aid group: 400 dead in eastern Congo massacres, Associated Press
- Lemarchand, René (1964), Political Awakening in the Belgian Congo, University of California Press, GGKEY:TQ2J84FWCXN
- Plaut, Martin (28 March 2010), "DR Congo rebel massacre of hundreds is uncovered", BBC News, BBC
- Sergeant, Barry (26 Oct 2009), "Beyond Moto - African gold stocks rock", Mineweb, archived from the original on 2009-10-24
- Shakespeare, Howard (June 1993). "KILO MOTO". Scripophily. Archived from the original on 2012-04-25.
- Vanderlinden, R. (1968), "Moulaert (Georges-Brunon-Joseph-Marie)", Biographie Belge d'Outre-Mer, vol. VI, Bruxelles: Académie royale des sciences d'Outre-mer, pp. col.758–762, archived from the original on 2019-09-07
- Vanderlinden, Jacques (15 April 1994), Pierre Ryckmans 1891-1959: Coloniser dans l'honneur, De Boeck Supérieur, ISBN 978-2-8041-1881-5
- Vanthemsche, Guy (29 April 2013), "MOULAERT (George Brunon)", Biographical Dictionary of Overseas Belgians (in French), ARSOM
- Vanthemsche, Guy (19 November 2019), "BERTRAND (Alexis Félicien)", Biographie Belge D'Outre-mer, Academie Royale des Sciences D'Outremer – via RAOS
