= Kilo-Moto =

Region in the Democratic Republic of the Congo

- Location in DRC
- Location: Haut-Uele, Ituri, Democratic Republic of the Congo; 1°46′15″N 30°17′27″E
- Products: Gold
- Opened: 1905

Kilo-Moto is a region in the far northeast corner of the Democratic Republic of the Congo (DRC) where gold was discovered in the Ituri River by government prospectors in 1903. Moto is in the Haut-Uélé Province and Kilo in the Ituri Province.

== Location ==
Kilo Moto is a semi-continuous greenstone belt in the northeast of the DRC. In the northern part, the Moto Goldmines project has an aggregate lease area of 1,841 square kilometres (711 sq mi), with most activity centered on a 35 square kilometres (14 sq mi) area around the old Durba gold mine. It is possible that as much as 25.7m ounces of gold are present. In the center is the Zani-Kodo area. To the south is the Mongbwalu field, a 10,000 square kilometres (3,900 sq mi) concession to the north and east of Bunia that is mainly owned by AngloGold Ashanti with the DRC parastatal Office des Mines de Kilo Moto (OKIMO) holding a 13.78% interest.

== Colonial period ==
The Kilo mine was opened in 1905 and the Moto mine in 1911. Gold was also extracted by panning the river gravels. In 1919 the government created the Régie Industrielle des Mines de Kilo-Moto, an autonomous body. In 1926 the Régie was converted into a commercial company, the Société des Mines d’Or de Kilo-Moto. Hydroelectric stations were built to power the crushing plants, and by 1930 the two mines, but mostly Kilo, were producing almost 5,000 kilograms (11,000 lb) annually.

During the 1950s and 1960s Belgian charter companies extracted over 3m ounces from a total recorded 11m ounces of gold from hard-rock mines in the Kilo Moto belt. Mining included a mixture of alluvials and shallow oxide pits. There were also underground industrial mines near Mongbwalu, namely Adidi, Senzere and Makala. The Democratic Republic of the Congo became independent in 1960 and the company was nationalised without compensation in 1967.

== Post-colonial developments ==
As of 2011, Rio Tinto was in a joint venture with Kilo Goldmines, a Canadian company, to develop properties in the vicinity of Isiro and Mambasa. Kilo Goldmines was also active in a joint venture with Somituri sprl, a local company, in exploiting properties in the territories of Mambasa and Wamba near the village of Nia Nia. Colonial mines produced gold in this area from the 1920s until 1958. OKIMO held a 10% interest in a joint venture between AngloGold Ashanti and Randgold in the Kibali Gold Mine which the Randgold CEO has called the largest gold mine in Africa outside of South Africa. The partners had acquired the former owner Moto Gold Mines in October 2009.
