= Hamilton RFC, Sea Point =

South African rugby union club, based in Cape Town

(South Africa) Hamilton RFC
- Full name: Hamilton Rugby Football Club
- Union: Western Province Rugby Football Union
- Nickname: Hammies
- Founded: 1875; 151 years ago
- Location: Sea Point, Cape Town, South Africa
- President: David Kagan
- Coach: Niekkie Viljoen
- Captain: Louis Nel
- League: WP Super League A
- 2

Official website
- www.hamiltonsrfc.co.za

Hamilton Rugby Football Club was founded in March 1875 in Cape Town, and states that it is the oldest rugby union club in South Africa. Hamilton RFC played in the first official match at Newlands Stadium on 31 May 1890.

== Origins ==
The club's inception occurred when a Mr. W. Nightingale called together a meeting of football enthusiasts at the offices of Messrs. Hamilton Ross & Co. The meeting took the name of their club from a Hamilton Football Club (est. 1868) in Scotland of which Nightingale had been a member. The club merged with Sea Point Rugby Football Club in 1910 and in 1914 adopted its current jersey colours of three wide bands of red, black and yellow.

== Club honours ==
- 2023: Hamiltons was selected to represent South Africa in the Amateur Rugby World Cup in France. Hamiltons won the inaugural competition beating Cobs and Cogs from Chile in the Final.
- 2013: Hamiltons qualified to participate in the 2014 national club competition, the SARU Community Cup, by ending at the top of non-university sides in the 2013 edition of Western Province's Super League A.
- 1883–2011: Hamilton RFC won WP's Grand Challenge Cup 15 times, in 2009, 1936, 1929, 1927, 1908, 1906, 1900, 1898, 1895, 1890, 1889, 1887, 1886, 1885 and 1883.
- 2010: Hamilton RFC's sevens team won the 120th international Melrose Sevens competition in Scotland, and were runners up in 2011 to Melrose RFC.
- 2009: Hamiltons won WP's Super League A and went on to beat Pukke 36–34 at Loftus Versfeld Stadium to claim the SAA national club championships.
- 2009–14: Hamiltons hosted the inaugural Cape Town Tens rugby tournament, "the biggest ten-a-side tournament in world rugby", and will do so again for the 6th time in February 2014. The event was launched by former Springboks Robbie Fleck and Bob Skinstad in 2009, and organizers anticipated "more than 2,000 players and 12,000 spectators" to participate.

== Notable members ==
- Loftus Versfeld – played for Hamiltons "for five or six years"; won the inaugural Western Province Grand Challenge Cup with Hamilton RFC (1883); founder member, Eastern Province Rugby Union; won Eastern Province Grand Challenge Cup with Union RFC (1888); founder, Pretoria Rugby Club; won Transvaal Grand Challenge Cup with Pretoria RFC (1889); played for a Country XV against W.E. McLagan's touring British side (1891); founder member, Pretoria Rugby Subunion (1908) which in 1938 became Northern Transvaal; established Pretoria rugby headquarters at Eastern Sports Grounds; introduced grass playing fields to the Transvaal
- W.V. ('Billy') Simkins – first president of Hamiltons; first referee to supervise a match at Newlands Stadium (31 May 1890); chairperson of the South African Rugby Board; chairperson of the Western Province Rugby Union; chairperson of the Western Province Cricket Union.
- Bennie Osler, captain of Hamiltons (1927–1928 & 1930), Springbok (17 tests, 46 points); captain on tour to British Isles & Ireland (1931–32); joint record-holder, most consecutive test appearances at flyhalf (17).

=== Springboks ===
Several players represented South Africa while members of Hamiltons but did not necessarily make their debut for South Africa as such. The following players made their test debut for the Springboks while being members of Hamiltons.

#	Name	Year
1.	Ben Duff	1891
2.	Oupa Versfeld	1891
3.	Hasie Versfeld	1891
4.	Charlie Brown	1903
5.	Tommy Hobson	1903
6.	Tommy Hepburn	1903

7.	Alec Reid	1903
8.	Joe Anderson	1903
9.	Arthur Burmeister	1906
10.	Jackie Tindall	1924
11.	SP van Wyk	1928
12.	Gerry Brand	1928
13.	Jan Pickard	1953

14.	Roy Dryburgh	1955
15.	Wang Wyness	1962
16.	Tiny Naudé	1963
17.	Kobus Burger	1989
18.	Toks van der Linde	1995

== See also ==
- Hamilton RFC, Sea Point players
