= Robert Loftus Owen Versfeld =

South African rugby union player and administrator

Loftus Versfeld
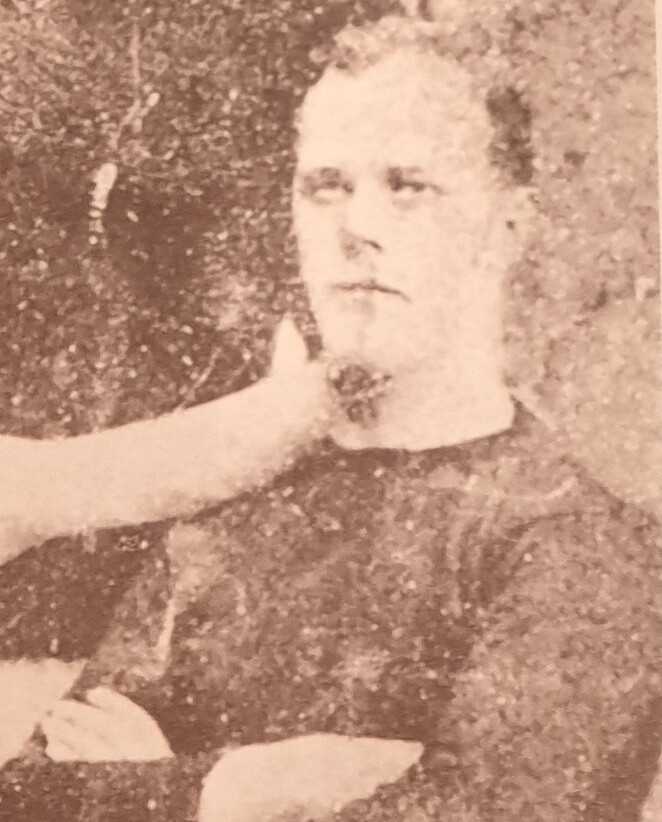
- circa 1891
- Born: Robert Loftus Owen Versfeld; 7 December 1862 Constantia, Cape Colony
- Died: 4 May 1932 (aged 69) Ellis Park, Johannesburg
- Notable relative(s): Marthinus Versfeld, Charles Versfeld
- Occupation(s): Solicitor, Administrator

Rugby union career
- Position: Three-quarter
Amateur team(s)
Years	Team	Apps	(Points)
1880–85	Hamiltons RFC, Sea Point		
1888	Union RFC, Uitenhage		
1889–97	Pretoria RFC, Pretoria		
Provincial / State sides
Years	Team	Apps	(Points)
1885	Cape Town XV		
1889	Transvaal		
1891	Transvaal Country XV		

Robert Loftus Owen Versfeld (7 December 1862 – 5 May 1932) was a South African rugby union player and administrator who was a founding member of the Eastern Province Rugby Union and of the Pretoria Rugby Subunion (1908) which in 1938 became Northern Transvaal. He founded Pretoria Rugby Club in 1888, and established Pretoria rugby headquarters at Eastern Sports Grounds. He introduced grass playing fields to the Transvaal.

Versfeld is the only South African player to have won a Grand Challenge Cup in three different provinces with three different teams: the inaugural Western Province Grand Challenge Cup with Hamilton Rugby Football Club in 1883; the Eastern Province Grand Challenge Cup with Union RFC in 1888; and the Transvaal Grand Challenge Cup with Pretoria RFC in 1889. He also played for a Transvaal Country XV against Bill MacLagan's touring British Isles side in 1891.

== Early life and family ==
Loftus Versfeld was born at Constantia, South Africa as the third child to Marthinus Versveld (sic, 8 November 1815 – 5 January 1870) and Johanna Hillegonda Carolina Owen. The Versfelds (spelled 'Versfelt' or 'Versveld' prior to 1870) came from ancient Dutch stock which can probably be traced back to a Gerald Versfeld who in 1200 lived near Zevenaar in the Netherlands. The progenitor of the South African Versfelds was William Ferdinand Versfelt (1745–87), who came to the Cape in 1773 as secretary to his nephew, Peter Baron Van Rheede, Lord of Oudshoorn, designated governor. Baron van Rheede died on the journey to the Cape of Good Hope.

Loftus had an older sister, Helen Elizabeth (b.1861), and was the second of five brothers; Marthinus (b.1860), Jan Hendrik (b. 1864), Charles (b. 1866), and Willem (1870).

== Rugby career ==
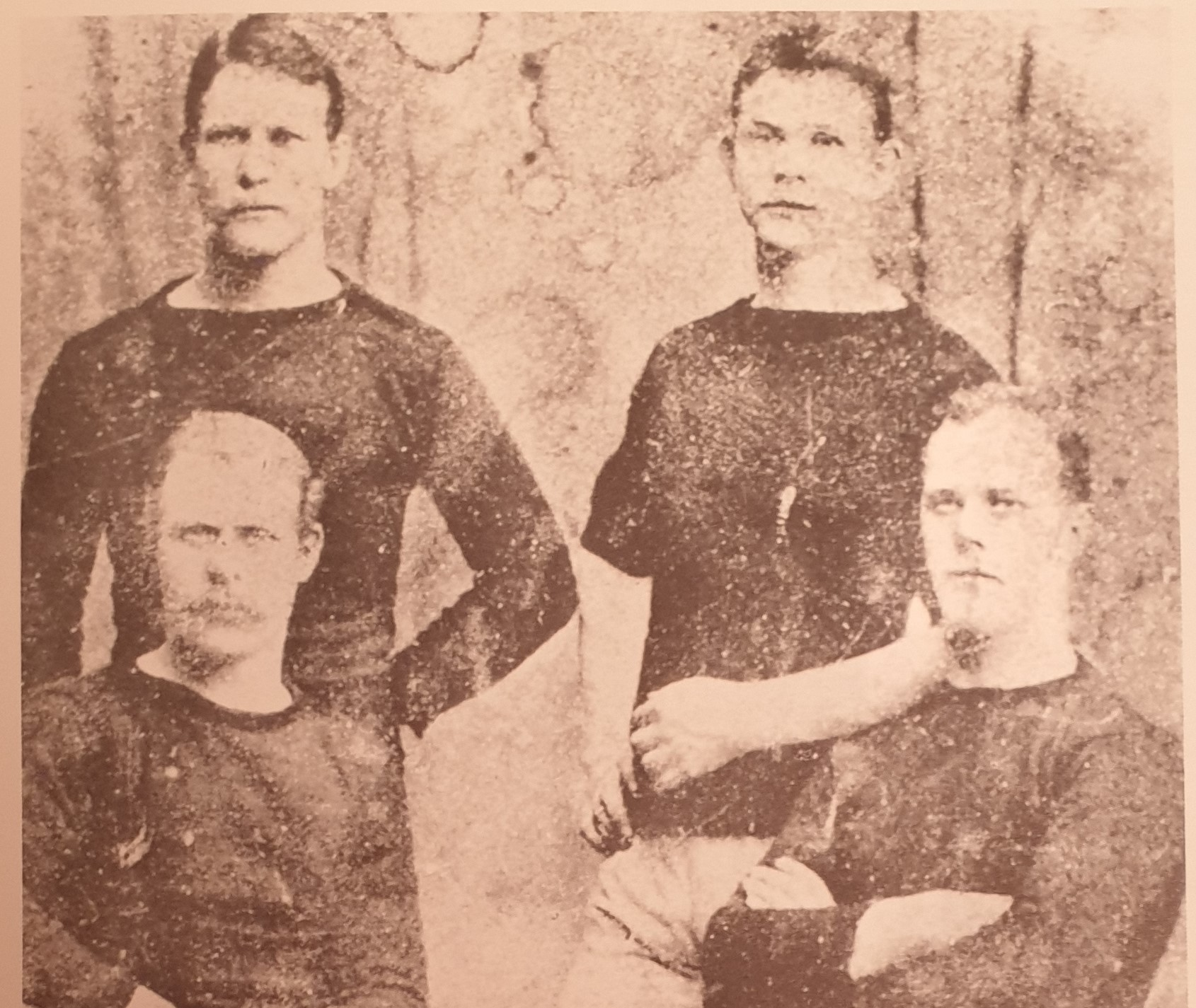
The Versfeld brothers. Standing: John and Hasie. Sitting: Oupa and Loftus

Loftus and three of his five brothers, John, Marthinus (Oupa), and Charles (Hasie) all played rugby for Hamilton RFC. In 1885 all four were in the Hamilton side that won the inaugural WP Grand Challenge Cup. In the same year they were on the Combined Cape Town team that competed in the first interprovincial competition at Grahamstown. Loftus was later named as a life-member of Hamiltons.

Versfeld moved to Murraysburg, where he practiced law, and then to Uitenhage, where he still lives in 1886. He not only helped start the Union Club, but also the Eastern Province Rugby Union. He was on Union's 1888 team that won the inaugural Eastern Province Grand Challenge Cup. In 1888 Versfeld moved to Pretoria, and started the Good Hope Football Club, which later became Pretoria Rugby Football Club, "the oldest Rugby Football Club in the Transvaal". He was the captain of Pretoria's 1889 team which won the first Transvaal Grand Challenge Cup. Although rugby had been played in Pretoria since 1887, it had never been formally organized. Versfeld was the captain of Pretoria's 1889 team which won the first Transvaal Grand Challenge Cup.

Versfeld and his three brothers all faced Bill MacLagan's 1891 British tourists. Hasie and Oupa played alongside John in a Cape Town XV. Hasie became the first South African to score a try against an international touring side in Cape Town's 1–15 loss at Newlands on 9 July 1891. Tries then had a value of only 1 point, and Hasie's try was the only point scored against the Brits on their entire 1891 tour. Marthinus (3 caps) and Charles (1 cap) went on to represent South Africa's national team. Loftus was in the Transvaal Country Districts XV who on 15 August 1891 lost 0–22 to the British in Johannesburg. His teammates included the future Boer general Christiaan Beyers, "one of the leading players in Pretoria, a powerful forward, who led the van in rushes".

Versfeld retired from playing rugby in 1897, and became President of Pretoria RC. He started the Pretoria Rugby Subunion in 1908 of which he became the second President, following Fred Hopley. In recognition of his contributions to rugby Versfeld was named life-member of the subunion and eventually of the Transvaal Rugby Union. In 1919-20 he used imported kikuyu grass from Kenya to produce the first grass rugby field in the Transvaal.

Loftus Versfeld suffered a fatal heart attack while watching a Currie Cup fixture between Transvaal and the Free State at Ellis Park Stadium on 5 May 1932. His son, Wilfred, became President of the Northern Transvaal Rugby Union from its inception in 1938 until 1950. A year after Loftus' death the Eastern Sports Grounds – where Versfeld established rugby headquarters in Pretoria – were renamed Loftus Versfeld in his honour.

== See also ==
- Loftus Versfeld Stadium
