= Makombo massacre =

2009 massacre in Democratic Republic of Congo

Coordinates: 1.6167°N 30.1667°E

- Part of the Lord's Resistance Army insurgency
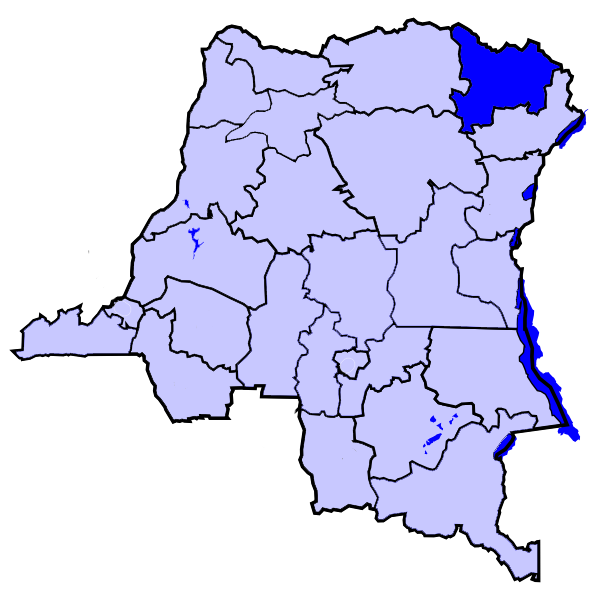
- Haut-Uele District, Democratic Republic of the Congo
- Location: Makombo, DR Congo
- Date: 14–17 December 2009
- Deaths: 321–345+ 250 abducted (80 children)
- Perpetrator: Lord's Resistance Army

The Makombo massacre took place from 14 to 17 December 2009 in the Haut-Uele District of Democratic Republic of the Congo in the village and region of Makombo. Human Rights Watch (HRW) believes the attacks, which killed 321 people, were perpetrated by the Lord's Resistance Army (LRA), which denied responsibility.

The sixty-mile (95 km) round-trip series of attacks began on 13 December 2009, in Mabanga Ya Talo, and continued until 18 December, traveling southeast down to the village of Tapili and back northwest again to the point of origin near the LRA camps on the north bank of the Uele River near Mavanzonguda.

== Details ==
The massacre is believed to have been perpetrated by LRA men in military uniforms, posing as Congolese soldiers. The LRA demanded that local villagers bring food and other supplies to them and turned to violence when they refused. The adults were made to act as porters, with those unable to keep up with the pace, refusing to cooperate, or trying to escape being killed.

According to Human Rights Watch,

LRA forces attacked at least 10 villages, capturing, killing, and abducting hundreds of civilians, including women and children. The vast majority of those killed were adult men, whom LRA combatants first tied up and then hacked to death with machetes or crushed their skulls with axes and heavy wooden sticks. The dead include at least 13 women and 23 children, the youngest a 3-year-old girl who was burned to death.

HRW first found out about the attacks in February 2010 after a mission visited the villages. News reports stated that the villagers who were spared were sent away with their lips and ears cut off as a warning to what would happen to other people if they talked. In addition HRW said that at least 250 people, including 80 children, were abducted during the attack and rapes and beatings were carried out. The kidnapped boys were taken to become child soldiers and the girls as sex slaves for the LRA men. LRA commander Dominic Ongwen, who was already facing seven counts of crimes against humanity and war crimes from the International Criminal Court, was said to have ordered the attacks.

A clergyman from Isiro-Niangara confirmed the HRW reports stating that at least 30 LRA members were involved in the attacks and that "between 200 and 400" had been kidnapped. A Congolese army lieutenant reported burying 268 bodies and a Red Cross volunteer buried a further seven bodies and nine skulls, including the son of a local chief. The attack was seen as an indication that the LRA remained active in the region despite losing its bases in Sudan after the Sudanese government signed a peace treaty with south Sudanese rebels in 2005 to end the Second Sudanese Civil War.

It has been suggested that the motive behind the attacks was to kidnap conscripts and steal medicine, clothes and food. This has been supported by reports that the LRA kidnapped nurses from hospitals and stripped clothes from corpses.

== Response ==
Madnoudje Mounoubai, an official with the United Nations Mission in the Democratic Republic of Congo, called for more cooperation between the DRC, Uganda, and the Central African Republic as the best way to prevent future attacks. A spokesperson for HRW said that the massacre was one of the worst to ever be committed by the LRA. The United Nations have confirmed that the massacre took place, that 290 deaths have so far been verified and that an investigation is ongoing.

The Lord's Resistance Army has called the report "yet another fabrication by NGOs that are advocating war." In addition, Lieutenant Colonel Felix Kulayigye of the Uganda People's Defence Force raised doubts over whether the LRA would have had time to kill and abduct so many people and said that the LRA totalled fewer than 200 men.

== See also ==
- 2008 Christmas massacres
- List of massacres in the Democratic Republic of the Congo
