= Bobby Godsell =

South African businessman (born 1952)

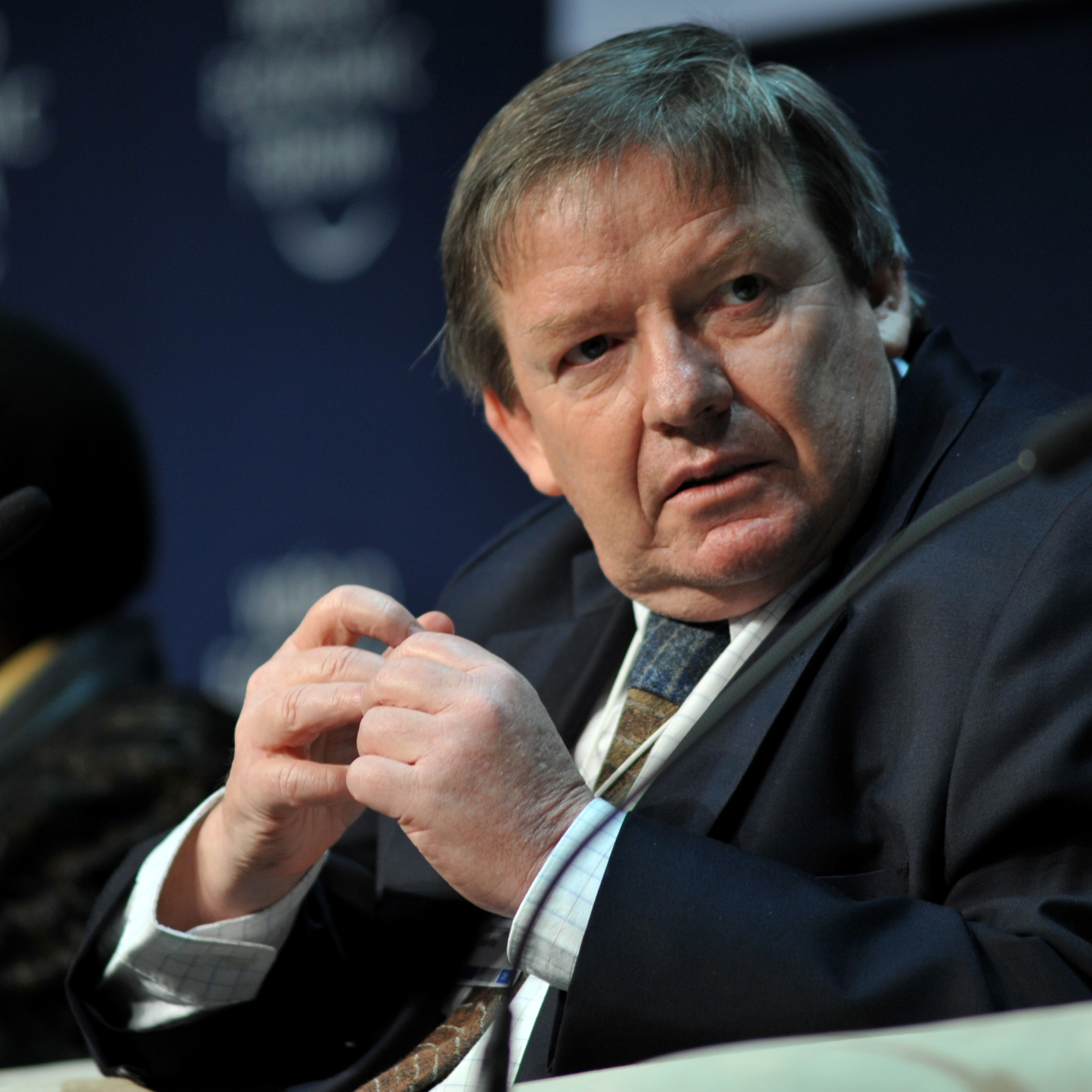
- Born: Robert Michael Godsell; 14 September 1952 (age 74); Johannesburg, South Africa
- Occupation: National Planning Commission of South Africa
- Spouse: Gillian Hall
- Children: 3
- Parent(s): Cyril Harold and Winnefred Godsell

Robert Michael "Bobby" Godsell (born 14 September 1952 in Johannesburg) is a retired South African businessman and the former CEO of South African gold mining company AngloGold Ashanti, a position he held from 1998 to 2007. He was the Non-Executive Chairman of Eskom from 2008 to 2009 and was appointed to the National Planning Commission of South Africa by former South African President Jacob Zuma on 30 April 2010.

His departure from Eskom in 2009 was under controversial circumstances, caused by a board room struggle with the company's CEO, Jacob Maroga. Godsell decided to resign while Maoga was later sacked. Godsell found himself accused of racism but was defended by both NUM (National Union of Mineworkers) and the ANC (African National Congress).

== Biography ==
Godsell completed a Master of Arts degree at the University of Cape Town, followed by a bachelor's degree at the University of Natal.

He became an executive director of Anglo American in 1991. He worked at the South African Chamber of Mines, first as a vice-president and later as its president. He was also chairman of the World Gold Council from 2001 to 2002.

Bobby Godsell was appointed CEO of the gold and uranium division of Anglo American in July 1995 and CEO of AngloGold in April 1998.

As CEO, he oversaw, alongside Sam E. Jonah, the merger of AngloGold and the Ashanti Goldfields Corporation, announced on 16 May 2003 and completed on 26 April 2004, to form AngloGold Ashanti.

Godsell announced his retirement on 31 July 2010 and retired from his position as CEO of AngloGold Ashanti on 30 September 2007, being replaced by Australian Mark Cutifani. He stated that, after 34 years in corporate life he was looking forward to exploring new ways of being a constructive citizen in his country, South Africa.

He returned from retirement in 2008, when he became the non-executive chairman of Eskom but resigned from the position in 2009. He remains a non-executive director of the Anglo American Corp., a position he has held since 1991. He is also the chairman of Business Leadership South Africa and has been appointed to the National Planning Commission (NPC) by President Jacob Zuma on 30 April 2010.

His resignation from Eskom came amidst a board room power struggle in the utility company between Godsell and CEO Jacob Maroga. Maroga was heavily criticised for power shortages, a record loss of R9,7 billion in the year to March 2009 and electricity price rises criticised for stoking inflation as South Africa battled recession. Maroga allegedly handed in his resignation, then denied doing so and Godsell, under political pressure from organisations supporting Maoga, decided to hand in his resignation instead.

== Personal life ==
Godsell, born to Cyril Harold & Winnefred Godsell, is married to Gillian Hall. The couple has three daughters.

== Legacy ==
Upon retirement, Bobby Godsell was described as "a visionary, that has done much to shape the destiny of both the South African labour relations landscape and that of AngloGold Ashanti" by then-chairman of AngloGold Ashanti, Russell Edey.

Under Godsell, AngloGold Ashanti had hedged 11.3 million ounces of gold, as of early 2008, twice the value of the company's annual production. Under his successor, Mark Cutifani, this was gradually reduced to 3.22 million. In October 2010, this remaining amount was paid off with US$2.63 billion, or US$1,300 per ounce of gold. The hedging of gold at low prices while the overall-gold price reached record heights in 2010 was financially very unfavourable for AngloGold Ashanti, forcing the company to sell gold at prices far below spot market value. Bobby Godsell and his then-marketing director Kelvin Williams found themselves blamed for the excessive hedging of the company, brought on in parts by the AngloGold-Ashanti merger.

Under Godsell's final years as CEO, AngloGold Ashanti experienced a high number of fatalities in its mines, 37 in 2006 and 34 in 2007. Under his successor, these numbers dropped to 14 in 2008 and 16 in 2009, achieved partly through new safety initiatives.

Godsell is highly regarded and trusted by the National Union of Mineworkers, who came out in his defence after he lost the power struggle within Eskom and was accused of racism, as did the African National Congress, the ANC. His positive relationship with the unions dates back to 1974, when he became labour relations expert and got involved in forming Anglo American's employment practice policies. His role in getting white business in South Africa to accept both the unpopular Labour Relations Act and, later, the mining charter in the transformation period of the country was instrumental and his relationship with Cyril Ramaphosa was crucial in all this.

| Preceded by Moosa, M.V. | Chairperson of Eskom Board; 2008-2009 | Succeeded by Makwana, P.M. |
