= Jeppe Street Power Station =

Power station in South Africa

Jeppe Street Power Station was the third of Joburg's power station. Built after World War One and next to the existing installations, the Jeppe Street Power station was intended to meet a surging in demand for electricity. The power station was commissioned in 1927 with a Turbine Hall and a single “North Boiler House”. A south boiler house was added in 1934. The station was decommissioned in 1961, though it was maintained on standby for backup power until 2000. AngloGold Ashanti purchased the site and redeveloped it into conference venue and office space.
