= Global Expansion Summit =

Global Expansion Summit is a business conference on corporate global expansion and foreign direct investment for business and government leaders. Focusing on organisations undergoing digital transformation, it is designed to help corporate decision makers find the best markets and business partners to facilitate successful business growth and efficiencies as they expand into new international markets.

Global Expansion Summit was founded in 2015 and was led by Fernando Faria, a former GSM Association director who led Mobile World Congress research and conference programmes. Fernando was behind the innovaBRICS event from 2012 to 2014, which discussed investment, innovation and business expansion in the BRICS countries.

== History ==
Fernando founded innovaBRICS in 2011 and organized the first edition in September 2012 at the BAFTA, in Piccadilly, London. Prominent speakers included Sir Edward Lister, Deputy Mayor of London, Rob Davies, Minister of Trade and Industry from South Africa and Jim O'Neill, then Chairman of Goldman Sachs Asset Management and creator of the term BRIC.

The second annual edition took place in October 2013 at law firm Hogan Lovells and featured speakers such as Anglo American CEO Mark Cutifani, Rwandan Finance Minister Claver Gatete and South African Finance Minister Pravin Gordhan.

The third annual edition of innovaBRICS took place in October 2014. It was sponsored and hosted by Deloitte and featured speakers such as Deloitte Global Chairman Steve Almond, Minister in the Presidency of South Africa Jeff Radebe and Standard Chartered Chairman Sir John Peace.

== Funding and expansion ==
After securing funding from a venture capital firm in New York the company, with new investors on board, decided to rebrand the event to Global Expansion Summit, therefore expanding the concept to include geographical expansion opportunities globally.

The fourth edition of the event, first under Global Expansion Summit name, took place in October 2016 at the Intercontinental O2 and hosted 900 attendees, a 4-fold growth from the last edition of innovaBRICS. It featured 120 speakers from companies around the world who were seeking advice and connections to improve their global footprint.

The fifth edition took place on 18–20 June 2017, at the same venue and had a record 1,100 attendees.

== Notable speakers ==
Speakers from 30+ countries ranging from blue chip companies like Coca-Cola to high-growth tech companies like Uber shared their insights at the event. Here is a non-exhaustive list:

- Jim O'Neill, Chairman of Goldman Sachs Asset Management
- Yi Xiaozhun, Deputy Director General, WTO
- Mari Kiviniemi, Deputy Secretary-General, OECD
- Pravin Gordhan, Minister of Finance of South Africa
- Sir John Peace, Chairman of Standard Chartered Bank
- Steve Almond, Global Chairman, Deloitte
- Zhou Ziaoming, Minister Counsellor, Chinese Embassy in London
- Mark Cutifani, CEO, Anglo American
- Jambu Palaniapan, General Manager EMEA, Uber
- Charles Race, President of Worldwide Operations, Okta
- David Cruickshank, Global Chairman, Deloitte
- Nilan Peiris, VP of Growth, Transferwise
- Shawn Xu, International Expansion, Square
- Helen Sutton, VP Enterprise Northern Europe, DocuSign
- Alex McCracken, Managing Director, Silicon Valley Bank
- Beto Richa, Governor of Parana State, Brazil
- Denzil Samuels, Global Head of Channels, Business Development & Ventures, GE Digital
- Dr Remo Gerber, CEO UK & Western Europe, Gett
- Laurence Kemball Cook, CEO and Founder, Pavegen
