= Sam E. Jonah =

Ghanaian businessman

Samuel Esson Jonah KBE, ACSM
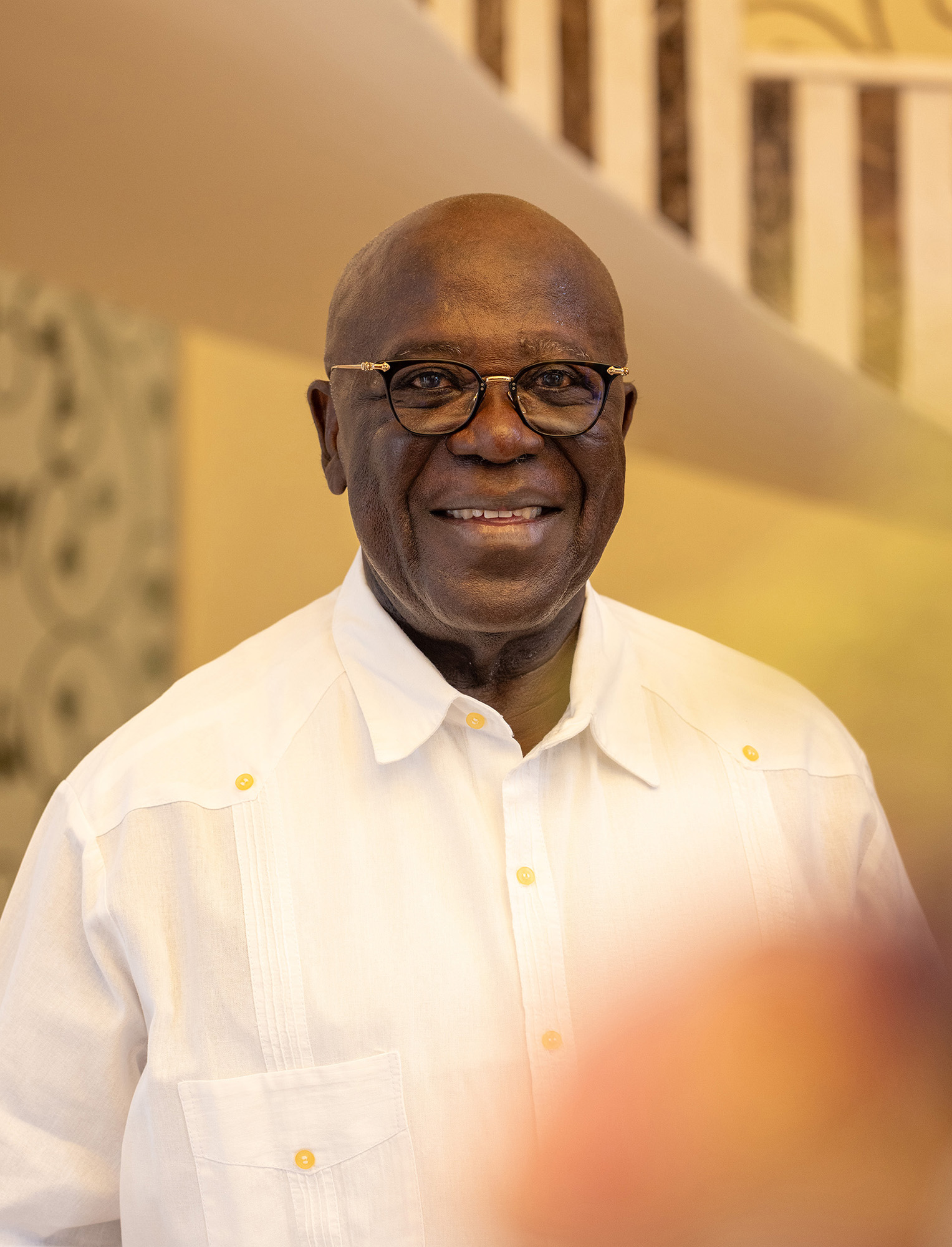

Chancellor of the University of Cape Coast
- Incumbent
- Assumed office 9 March 2002

Personal details
- Born: Sam Jonah; 19 November 1949 (age 76) Obuasi
- Spouse: Giselle Jonah
- Children: 5
- Parent: Thomas Jonah (father)
- Education: Adisadel College; Camborne School of Mines; Imperial College
- Occupation: Businessman
- Known for: President, AngloGold Ashanti; Chancellor, University of Cape Coast
- Awards: Order of the British Empire

Samuel Esson Jonah (born 19 November 1949) is a Ghanaian businessman and the current Chancellor of the University of Cape Coast. He is the executive chairman of Jonah Capital, an equity fund based in Johannesburg, South Africa. Jonah was previously president of AngloGold Ashanti and shared the strategic leadership of the company with its CEO, Bobby Godsell.

== Early life and education ==
Sam Jonah is a Fante Royal but born in Obuasi and had his high-school education at Adisadel College then earned an Associateship in Mining Engineering at the Camborne School of Mines and subsequently a MSc in Mine Management at the Imperial College of Science and Technology.

== Career ==
He joined Ashanti Goldfields Corporation in 1979, working in various capacities, including underground operations. At the age of 36 he became the chief executive officer, and supervised the transformation of Ashanti Goldfields into a mining multinational, increased gold production from 240,000 ounces per annum to over 1.6 million ounces in over ten years, and oversaw the company's listing as the first operating African company on the New York Stock Exchange.

In 2009, he became a non-executive director of Vodafone.

Jonah was elected a member of the National Academy of Engineering in 2019 for leadership and technical contributions in advancing the mineral industry in Africa.

Currently, the chancellor of the University of Cape Coast, Jonah chairs the boards of Equator Exploration Limited, Scharrig Mining, Equinox Minerals, Uramin, Moto Goldmines Ltd and Range Resources Limited. He also serves or has served on various boards, including Transnet, Mittal Steel SA, Ashesi University, Standard Bank of South Africa, Lonmin, the Commonwealth African Investment Fund (Comafin), the advisory council of the UN Secretary General's Global Compact, President Olusegun Obasanjo's International Investment Advisory Council on Nigeria, President Thabo Mbeki's International Investment Advisory Council of South Africa, and President John Kufuor's Ghana Investors' Advisory Council. As well as his directorships, Jonah is a member of the advisory board of the London Business School. He is also a board member of the Otumfuo Osei Tutu II Foundation.

== Honours and recognition ==
Jonah's honours include an honorary Doctor of Science (D.Sc.) degree awarded jointly by the Camborne School of Mines and the University of Exeter (UK) in 1996. Jonah House in Adisadel College has been named after his father, Thomas Jonah. In June 2003, Jonah became the first Ghanaian to be knighted in the 21st century when he was presented with an honorary knighthood (KBE) by the Prince of Wales, in recognition of his achievements as an African businessman, a leading business executive from the Commonwealth, and an international public figure. Jonah has listed among the richest people in Ghana. On 5 December 2019, he was appreciated by the Ghana Mine workers union with a platinum award for his contribution to developing the mining industry in Ghana. In January 2023, he was listed among the 100 most reputable Africans in the field of business.

Business leader Sir Sam Jonah was named Ultimate Man of the Year at the 2025 EMY Africa Awards, celebrating his lifelong contributions to business and leadership across Africa.

== Personal life ==
Sam Jonah is married to Giselle Jonah and has 5 children.
