= Mark Bristow (businessman) =

South African businessman

- Born: Dennis Mark Bristow; 7 January 1959 (age 67); Estcourt, South Africa
- Education: Estcourt High School; University of Natal
- Occupation: Businessman
- Title: Former CEO, Barrick Gold
- Term: 1995–2025
- Successor: Mark Hill (interim)
- Spouse: Married
- Children: 2

Dennis Mark Bristow is a South African businessman, who was the president and CEO at Barrick Gold Corporation until September 2025. He was previously the founder and CEO at Randgold Resources, which was purchased by Barrick in 2018.

== Early life ==
Born in Estcourt, South Africa, Bristow attended Estcourt High School and then graduated from the University of Natal with BSc and PhD degrees in geology. In the 1970s, he served as an officer in the South African Army and saw active service against guerrillas in Swaziland and Angola.

== Career ==
Bristow joined Rand Mines in 1981 and then became head of exploration at Randgold & Exploration. In 1995 he created Randgold Resources and listed it on the London Stock Exchange in 1997. In 2018, Barrick agreed to buy Randgold in an all-stock deal for US$6.5 billion, creating the world's largest gold producer, at the time.

On 29 September 2025, Bristow unexpectdedly resigned as CEO of Barrick, and veteran Barrick executive Mark Hill was appointed interim president and CEO.

== Personal life ==
He is married with two sons, and has homes in London, the United States, South Africa, and Mauritius.
