= Jackie Tindall =

South African rugby union player

Jack Tindall
- Full name: John Christopher Tindall
- Born: 26 March 1900 Stellenbosch, South Africa
- Died: 3 May 1946 (aged 46)
- Height: 1.70 m (5 ft 7 in)
- Weight: 68.5 kg (151 lb)

Rugby union career
- Position: Fullback
Provincial / State sides
Years	Team	Apps	(Points)
- Western Province
International career
Years	Team	Apps	(Points)
1924–28	South Africa	5	(0)

John Christopher Tindall (26 March 1900 – 3 May 1946) was a South African international rugby union player.

Born in Stellenbosch, Tindall was the son of Griqualand West representative Henry Tindall. His uncle William was also capped at provincial level for Transvaal. He was educated at Paul Roos Gymnasium.

Tindall played his rugby in Western Province and captained Cape Town club Hamilton. He was involved with the Springboks for the first time in 1921, as a fly-half on their tour of Australia and New Zealand, but didn't feature in any Test matches. On the recommendation of Gerhard Morkel, Tindall later switched to fullback and was capped in a win over the 1924 British Lions at Kingsmead. He was the Springboks fullback for all four Test matches against the touring All Blacks in 1928. During the 1931–32 tour of British Isles, Tindall was hospitalised after suffering an abdominal injury against London at Twickenham, which developed into peritonitis. His condition was at one stage critical.

== See also ==
- List of South Africa national rugby union players
