= Christopher Coleman (businessman) =

British investment banker and corporate director (born 1968)

- Born: 25 June 1968 (age 58); London, England
- Education: Westminster School; London School of Economics
- Occupation: Businessman
- Spouse: Vivienne Lundgren
- Children: 2 sons
- Parent(s): John Coleman; Anne Marie Coleman

Christopher Coleman (born 25 June 1968) is a British investment banker and corporate director. He is the managing director and group head of banking of N M Rothschild & Sons. He is also the chairman of Randgold Resources.

== Early life ==
Christopher Coleman was born on 25 June 1968 in London. He was the son of Anne Marie and John Coleman. He was educated at the Westminster School. He graduated from the London School of Economics, where he earned a BSc in economics.

== Career ==
Coleman began his career at N M Rothschild & Sons in 1989. Since 2015, he has served as Rothschild's Managing Director and Group Head of Banking.

Coleman served on the board of directors of MBCA Bank from 2001 to 2001. He has served on the board of Papa John's International since 2012. He was a non-executive director of Randgold Resources from 2008 to 2014, when he became its chairman.

== Personal life ==
Coleman married Vivienne Lundgren in 1997. They have two sons.
