= 2025 Obuasi shooting =

The Obuasi Gold Mine Shooting was a fatal incident that occurred on January 19, 2025, at the AngloGold Ashanti gold mine in Obuasi, Ashanti Region, Ghana.

== Incident ==
A dispute arose between Ghanaian soldiers and small-scale miners at the AngloGold Ashanti mine, resulting in the deaths of several individuals. The Ghana National Association of Small Scale Miners reported that nine unarmed people were killed and fourteen severely injured in the incident. However, the Ghana Armed Forces claimed that seven illegal miners were killed in a firefight after breaching the mine's security fence and firing on a military patrol.

== Reactions ==
Kofi Adams, local chairman of the Ghana National Association of Small Scale Miners, described the incident as "unprecedented" and expressed difficulty understanding why the military had used lethal force. Ghana's President John Dramani Mahama ordered an immediate investigation into the incident, calling it "tragic". The government has also asked AngloGold Ashanti to cover the medical expenses of the injured and the cost of burials.

== Aftermath ==
The incident has raised concerns about the use of force by the military and the treatment of small-scale miners in Ghana. The investigation ordered by President Mahama is ongoing, and the outcome is awaited.
