= Oupa Versfeld =

South African rugby union footballer

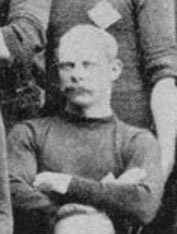
- Born: Marthinus Versfeld; 15 May 1860 Cape Town, South Africa
- Died: 1 September 1931 (aged 71) Cape Town, South Africa
- School: SACS
- Notable relative(s): Hasie Versfeld (brother), Loftus Versfeld (brother), John Versfeld (brother)

Rugby union career
- Position: Forward
Amateur team(s)
Years	Team	Apps	(Points)
–	Hamiltons		
Provincial / State sides
Years	Team	Apps	(Points)
1884–1892	Western Province		
International career
Years	Team	Apps	(Points)
1891	South Africa	3	(0)

Marthinus "Oupa" Versfeld (15 May 1860 – 1 September 1931) was a South African international rugby union player.

== Early life and family ==
Born in Constantia and educated in Cape Town, where he attended SACS, Versfeld was the oldest of five brothers, four of whom played representative rugby. He and his second youngest brother, Hasie represented South Africa. His brother Loftus played for Transvaal and as an administrator was a founding member of the Eastern Province Rugby Union and of the Pretoria Rugby Subunion, which in 1938 became Northern Transvaal. The rugby stadium, Loftus Versfeld is named after him. The middle brother, Jan Hendrik Christoffel (John) represented Western Province from 1885 to 1889. All four brothers were members and played for the Hamiltons RFC, based in Sea Point, Cape Town. Versfeld died in 1931, in Cape Town, at the age of 71.

== Rugby career ==
Versfeld played provincial rugby with Western Province and made his debut for the union in 1884. In 1885 all four brothers were in the Hamilton side that won the inaugural WP Grand Challenge Cup. In the same year they were on the Combined Cape Town team that competed in the first interprovincial competition at Grahamstown. Oupa and Hasie played alongside John in a Cape Town XV against Bill MacLagan's 1891 British tourists. Hasie became the first South African to score a try against an international touring side in Cape Town's 1–15 loss at Newlands on 9 July 1891.

Versfeld made his only Test appearances for South Africa against the touring 1891 British Isles. He played, as a forward, in all three Test matches of what was South Africa's first series as a Test nation. His brother, Hasie Versfeld, was also selected to play in the 3rd Test of the series, making the Versfelds the first brothers to represent South Africa.

=== Test history ===
No.	Opponents	Results(SA 1st)	Position	Tries	Date	Venue
1.	(United Kingdom) British Isles	0–4	Forward		30 Jul 1891	Crusaders Ground, Port Elizabeth
2.	(United Kingdom) British Isles	0–3	Forward		29 Aug 1891	Eclectic Cricket Ground, Kimberley
3.	(United Kingdom) British Isles	0–4	Forward		5 Sep 1891	Newlands, Cape Town

== See also ==
- List of South Africa national rugby union players – Springbok no. 7
