= Wang Wyness =

South African rugby union player

- Born: Melville Richard Kenneth Wyness; 23 January 1937 Colesberg, South Africa
- Died: 6 November 2011 (aged 74) Onrusrivier, South Africa
- Height: 1.78 m (5 ft 10 in)
- Weight: 73 kg (161 lb)
- School: Sea Point Boys High School, Cape Town

Rugby union career
- Position: Centre
Amateur team(s)
Years	Team	Apps	(Points)
- Hamiltons RFC
Provincial / State sides
Years	Team	Apps	(Points)
1962–1966	Western Province		
International career
Years	Team	Apps	(Points)
1962–1963	South Africa	5	(3)

Melville Richard Kenneth "Wang" Wyness (23 January 1937 – 6 November 2011) was a South African rugby union player.

== Playing career ==
Wyness was born in Colesberg and first went to school at Marist Brothers' College in Rondebosch, where he inherited his nickname from his older brother. He moved to Sea Point Boys' High and then played for 12 seasons for Hamiltons RFC. Wyness made his provincial debut for Western Province in 1962.

Wyness made his test match debut for the Springboks against the 1962 British Lions, when Dave Stewart was injured shortly before the test and he was surprisingly selected to replace him. He played in all four tests against the Lions and then another against Australia in 1963.

He retired to Onrus and died at home on 6 November 2011 after a battle with cancer.

=== Test history ===
No.	Opponents	Results (RSA 1st)	Position	Tries	Dates	Venue
1.	British Lions	3–3	Centre		23 Jun 1962	Ellis Park, Johannesburg
2.	British Lions	3–0	Centre		21 Jul 1962	Kings Park, Durban
3.	British Lions	8–3	Centre		4 Aug 1962	Newlands, Cape Town
4.	British Lions	34–14	Centre	1	25 Aug 1962	Free State Stadium, Bloemfontein
5.	Australia	5–9	Centre		10 Aug 1963	Newlands, Cape Town

== See also ==
- List of South Africa national rugby union players – Springbok no. 381
