= Quentin Smythe =

Quentin George Murray Smythe VC
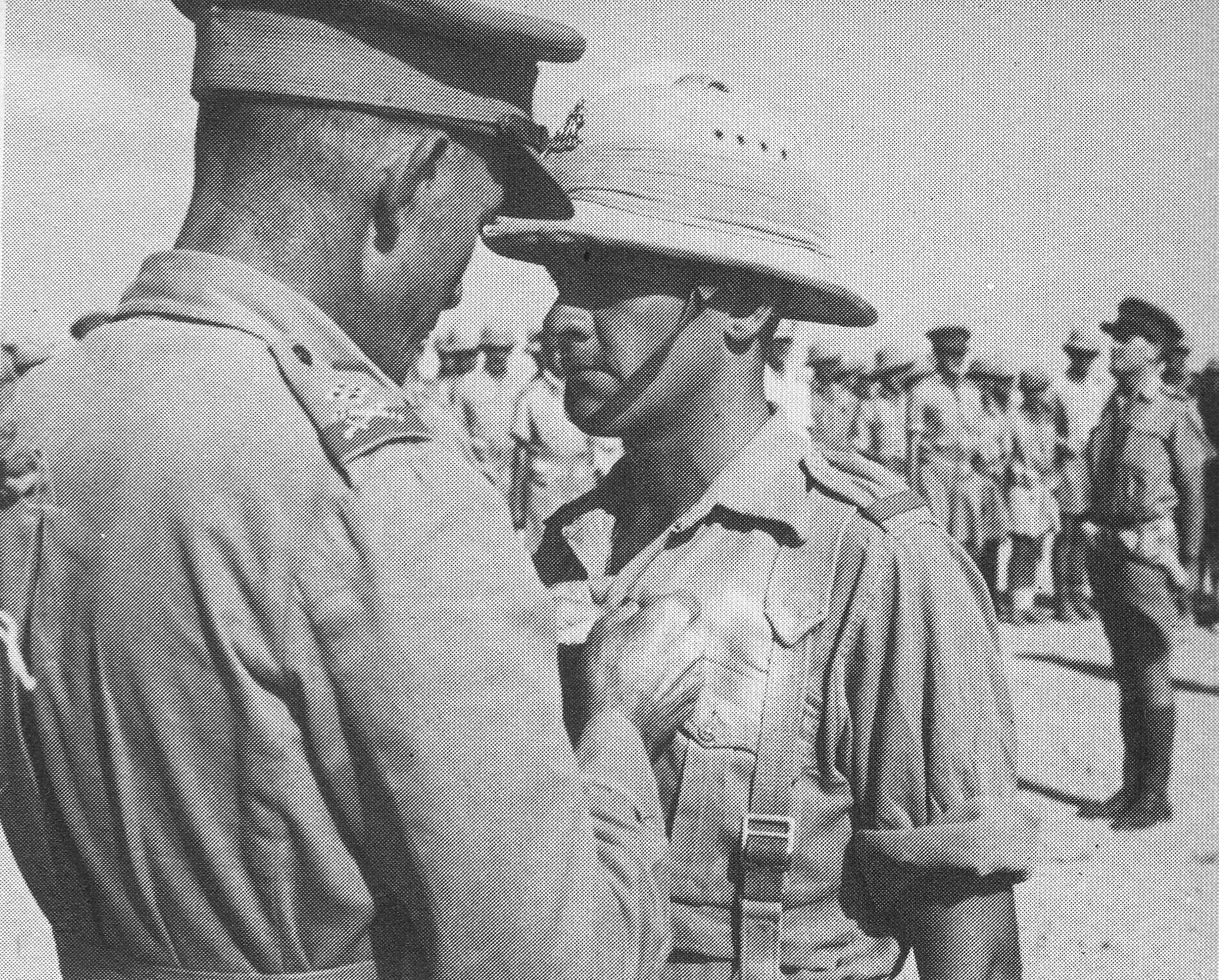
- Smythe receiving his Victoria Cross from Maj Gen Dan Pienaar
- Born: 6 August 1916; Nottingham Road, Natal, Union of South Africa
- Died: 22 October 1997 (aged 81); Durban, KwaZulu-Natal, South Africa
- Military career
- Allegiance: South Africa
- Branch: South African Army
- Rank: Captain
- Units: Royal Natal Carabineers
- Conflicts: World War II: Operation Crusader
- Awards: Victoria Cross

Quentin George Murray Smythe VC (6 August 1916 – 22 October 1997) was a South African recipient of the Victoria Cross, the highest and most prestigious award for gallantry in the face of the enemy that can be awarded to British and Commonwealth forces.

== Early life ==
Smythe was born on 6 August 1916, the grandson of the penultimate Prime Minister of Natal, Charles Smythe and was educated at Weston Agricultural College and Estcourt High School.

== Military career ==
During the Second World War, he served with the 1st Battalion Royal Natal Carabineers 1st SA Infantry Division, South African Forces in the East Africa Campaign against the Italians before moving to the Western Desert.

=== Victoria Cross ===
He was 25 years old, and a sergeant when the South African Forces were attacked near Alem Hamza in Libya. During the attack, Smythe realised that there was no officer to command his platoon and took charge himself. Although he had a wound in his forehead, causing much loss of blood, he managed single-handedly to obliterate a machine gun post, taking all the surviving crew prisoner. Then, again single-handedly and armed only with rifle and bayonet, he promptly did the same with an enemy anti-tank gun crew, after which he consolidated the position. However, because of the deterioration of the situation elsewhere, he found himself ordered to withdraw.

He was awarded the Victoria Cross for his bravery, the citation was gazetted on 11 September 1942:

War Office, 11th September, 1942

The KING has been graciously pleased to approve the award of the VICTORIA CROSS to:

No. 4458 Sergeant Quentin George Murray Smythe, South African Forces.

For conspicuous gallantry in action in the Alem Hamza area on the 5th June, 1942.

During the attack on an enemy strong point in which his officer was severely wounded; Sergeant Smythe took command of the platoon although suffering from a shrapnel wound in the forehead. The strong point having been overrun, our troops came under enfilade fire from an enemy machine-gun nest. Realising the threat to his position, Sergeant Smythe himself stalked and destroyed the nest with hand grenades, capturing, the crew. Though weak from loss of blood, he continued to lead the advance, and on encountering an anti-tank gun position again attacked it single-handed and captured the crew. He was directly responsible for killing several of the enemy, shooting some and bayonetting another as they withdrew.

After consolidation he received orders for a withdrawal, which he successfully executed, defeating skilfully an enemy attempt at encirclement.

Throughout the engagement Sergeant Smythe displayed remarkable disregard for danger, and his leadership and courage were an inspiration to his men.

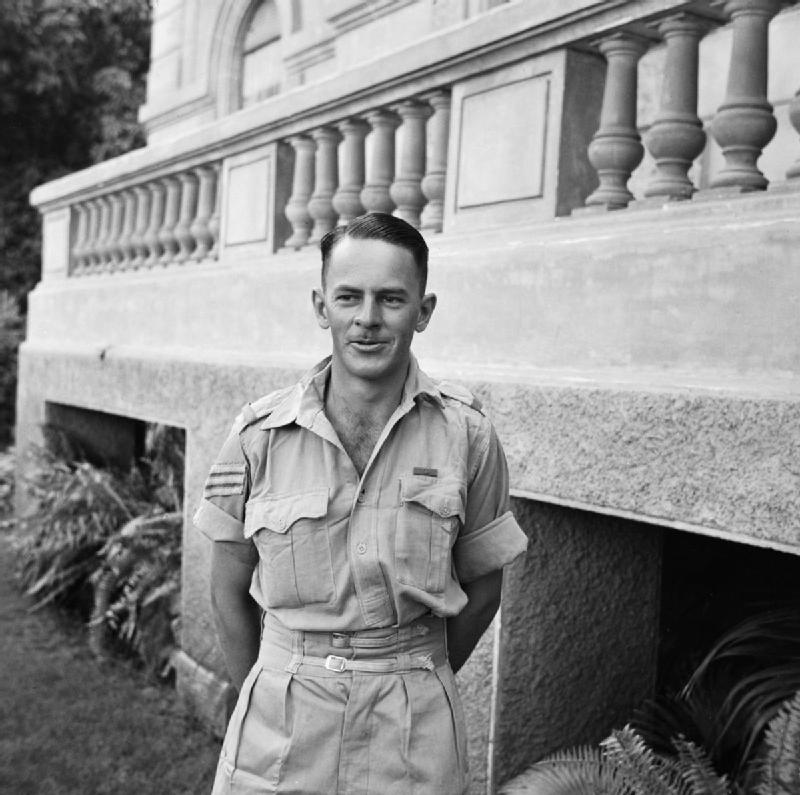
Portrait of Sgt Quentin Smythe, awarded the Victoria Cross: Western Desert, 5 June 1942

== Later life ==
He married Dale Griffiths, in 1945 (dissolved 1970); they had three sons and one daughter. He married Margaret Joan Shatwell in 1970; she died in 1980. He married his third wife, Patricia Stamper, in 1984.

He later achieved the rank of captain and after the war served with the South African Ministry of Defence. On leaving the Department of Defence, he returned to farming in the Richmond area of Natal. He was an outstanding marksman, a passionate conservationist and animal lover.

He died from cancer in Parklands Hospital Durban, South Africa in October 1997.

== The medal ==
Auctioned in UK 1998, the medal is now part of the Lord Ashcroft Collection at the Imperial War Museum in London.
