= Kibali Gold Mine =

Mine in Haut-Uele, Democratic Republic of the Congo

- Location in DRC
- Location: Haut-Uele, Democratic Republic of the Congo; 3°06′46″N 29°35′05″E
- Products: Gold
- Production: 814,000 ounces
- Financial year: 2019
- Type: Open pit, underground
- Opened: 2013
- Company: Kibali Goldmines

The Kibali Gold Mine is a combined open pit and underground gold mine in the Haut-Uélé province of the northeast Democratic Republic of the Congo. By area, it is one of the largest in Africa. The mine is named for the nearby Kibali River.

== Location ==
The Kibali Gold Mine is in the Watsa and Faradje territories of Haut-Uélé province, formerly the Haut-Uele District of Orientale Province. It is to the southeast of the town of Kalimva. It is about 220 kilometres (140 mi) east of Isiro, the capital of Haut-Uélé, 150 kilometres (93 mi) west of Arua on the Ugandan border, and 1,800 kilometres (1,100 mi) from the port of Mombasa in Kenya. The main access route is by road from Kampala, Uganda, about 650 kilometres (400 mi) distant.

The concession covers 1,836 square kilometres (709 sq mi) of the Kilo-Moto goldfields. It includes the Karagba-Chaffeur-Durba (KCD) deposit complex and the satellite Sessenge, Pakaka, Pamao, Gorumbwa, Kibali, Mengu Hill, Mengu Village, Megi, Marakeke, Kombokolo, Sessenge and Ndala deposits. It is in the Moto greenstone belt, which contains Archean volcano-sedimentary, pyroclastic and basaltic rocks, with mafic and felsic intrusions. There are two zones: Kibali-Durba-Karagba trends north-east, and Pakaka-Mengu trends north-west. Gold-bearing deposits are found throughout the region. As of December 2018 proven and probable gold reserves were about 8.3 million ounces.

== Background ==
The Australian prospectors Hannam and O'Brien discovered gold in the northeast of the Congo Free State in 1903. By August 1906 Hannam and O’Brien reported production of 600 ounces of gold per month, and shipped the first consignment to Brussels. In 1926 the Belgian government established the Société des Mines d’Or de Kilo-Moto (SOKIMO) to operate the mines. Most mining in the region around the Kibali Gold Mine took place in the 1950s, with more than 60% of production coming from the Gorumbwa, Agbarabo and Durba deposits.

There was a sharp drop in production during the unsettled conditions that followed independence in 1960, with most gold extracted by artisanal workers and small-scale alluvial operations. There are no accurate records of production during the period of civil unrest in the 1980s and 1990s. A joint venture between Barrick Gold and AngloGold Ashanti discovered the KCD deposit in 1998 and completed several drilling programs, but withdrew later that year due to local disturbances and civil war.

== Ownership ==
In 2004 Moto Goldmines acquired a 70% stake in the KCD concession, with SOKIMO retaining 30%. Moto completed feasibility studies in 2006–2009. Randgold Resources and AngloGold Ashanti entered a 50/50 joint venture in July 2009 and acquired Moto Goldmines. In December 2009 the joint venture acquired another 20% stake from SOKIMO. Barrick acquired Randgold in January 2019.

As of 2011 a joint venture between AngloGold Ashanti and Randgold Resources was actively developing the concession centered on the Durba mine.

As of 2020 the mine was owned by Kibali Goldmines, which in turn was owned by Barrick (45%), AngloGold Ashanti (45%) and Société Miniére de Kilo-Moto (SOKIMO) (10%). Barrick was the project operator.

== Facilities ==
The Kibali Gold Mine combines open pit and underground mining. Facilities include a sulphide and oxide plant that can process 7.2 million tonnes of ore per year, three 44MW hydroelectric stations, a 32MW backup thermal power generator and separate storage facilities for cyanide and flotation tailings. The company installed a 20 MW hydroelectric power plant on the Nzoro River, and planned to install three more. The power plants are on cataracts and provide run-of-the-river hydroelectricity, avoiding the need for dams.

The mine was commissioned in September 2013 after development costing $1.7 billion, and was expected to operate for 18 years. The Azambi hydropower plant came into operation in 2018. In 2019 the mine produced 814,000 ounces of gold, higher than the projected level of 600,000 ounces per year for the first twelve years of operation.

== Virus outbreaks ==
Between 1998 and 2000, co-circulating Marburg virus and Ravn virus caused 154 cases of Marburg virus disease and 128 deaths among illegal gold miners in Durba and nearby Watsa.

== Sources ==
- Alsdorf, Douglas; Beighley, Ed; Laraque, Alain; Lee, Hyongki; Tshimanga, Raphael; et al. (14 April 2016), "Opportunities for hydrologic research in the Congo Basin" (PDF), Reviews of Geophysics, 54 (2): 378–409, Bibcode:2016RvGeo..54..378A, doi:10.1002/2016RG000517
- Carisch, Enrico (2012), Conflict Gold to Criminal Gold - The new face of artisanal gold mining in Congo
- Kibali, Barrick
- "Kibali Gold Mine, Orientale", Mining Technology
- Quick, Rodney B.; Bottoms, Simon; Quarmby, Richard; Law, Andrew; Trusler, Graham E. (18 September 2018), Kibali Gold Mine NI 43-101 Technical Report (PDF), Randgold Resources
- Kibali Project (Kilo, Moto) - Karagba-Chaffeur-Durba (KCD), Mengu-Hill, Pakaka, Kombokolo, Rhino, Porter GeoConsultancy
