= Bangadi =

- Location in Democratic Republic of the Congo
- Coordinates: 4°8′47″N 27°54′18″E
- Country: Democratic Republic of the Congo
- Province: Haut-Uele
- Territory: Dungu
- Chiefdom: Wando
- Climate: Aw

Bangadi is a town located in Haut-Uele Province, Democratic Republic of the Congo.

== History ==
During Belgian colonial rule, Bangadi was an important town.

After the Duru September 2008 attack, the town residents established a self-defense group due to their distrust of the government. On 8 October, 120 self-defense group militias attacked the town police station and gained few firearms. LRA attacked Bangadi on 19 October, killing 9 and abducting 41 children. They looted and burned houses and pillaged a health center. Nevertheless, the town residents defeated them before reaching the central market. Due to the attack, the residents fled to the bush. During the Christmas massacres, LRA killed 48 people in Bangadi areas.

LRA stormed Bangadi on 22 January 2009 and the town self-defense group repelled the attack and chased them to the outskirts of the town. Two days later, FARDC sent 175 soldiers from the 911th Battalion to the town. The Bangadi self-defense group was abolished in June 2009 due to the order of Major Nelson Mugaba. In December 2009, the 911th Battalion departed from Bangadi and was replaced by the 912th Battalion.

== Education ==
The town has a primary school.

== Healthcare ==
There is a health center in the town.
