= Estcourt High School =

Coordinates: 29.00725°S 29.86535°E

- Estcourt, Kwa-Zulu Natal; South Africa

Information
- Type: Mixed Public School
- Motto: Celer et Audax (Swift and Bold)
- Established: Original foundation - 1886; High School - 1924
- Locale: Urban
- Colors: Black and Maroon

Estcourt High School is a school in Estcourt, South Africa that traces its origins to the Estcourt Government School which was founded in 1886. The high school itself was founded in 1924 when the government school was split into a high school and a junior school.

Estcourt High School, being a country school, pioneered agriculture as a school subject and also gave instruction in both English and Afrikaans.

== History ==
Estcourt High School was founded in 1924 from the upper forms of the Estcourt Government School when it was split into two.

=== Estcourt Government School ===
After a number of attempts to establish private schools had failed due to lack of support, the town's first government school, the Estcourt Government School was established in 1886 with an initial role of 45 children. In accordance with the prevailing colonial policy, the school only admitted pupils of European descent.

At the start of the twentieth of the century, the Estcourt Government School had about 100 children and only offered formal education at primary level, even though the occasional bright student was coached at secondary level to enable them to enter university. In 1915 lessons in Dutch was offered for the first time and 75 children out of 115 took up the subject. Although there were a few children who spoke Dutch or Afrikaans as their mother tongue, instruction in that language had to wait until 1945.

By 1924 the school had expanded to 226 children when the new headmaster, Major AC Martin MC arrived. Martin had been awarded the Military Cross during the First World War. That year four children sat the matriculation exam. This sparked a growth in demand for secondary education and in 1927 the school was split into two - Estcourt Junior School retaining the old school building and the high school moving to a new 10 ha site.

=== AC Martin's headmastership ===
Martin planned the new school as a co-educational school catering for both boarding and day pupils and by the end of his headmastership for both English and Afrikaans speaking pupils. During the first year of the school's existence on Hospital Hill, a hostel with 50 places was completed with a second hostel following in 1936. He was instrumental in the school having a coat of arms designed by the College of Heralds.

The school site was split into two by the Loskop road. Martin laid out the school's academic and hostel accommodation to the north of the road and the sports fields, consisting of two full sized cricket pitches, two rugby pitches, and three hockey pitches to the south of the road. He persuaded the Estcourt Town Council to donate a further 8 ha of land to the school enabling it to offer the study of agriculture to its pupils. A swimming pool was opened in 1931 - the first for any state school in the province.

In 1934 Martin initiated the building of a separate science block, but it was not completed until 1941, by which time Martin had left the school. The block was named Martin Block in his honour.

=== R O Pearse's headmastership ===
The Second World War broke out in 1939 and in 1940 Martin, was recalled to his regiment, the Durban Light Infantry. Martin, along with many school old boys and parents of pupils was later to be taken as a PoW at Tobruk. Three months after Martin left the school, Reg Pearse took up the headmastership of the school. Once the war had finished, Pearse set about expanding the school. Almost immediately he set about overcome administrative obstacles and developing strong ties with both the farming and town communities to negotiating funds for the Memorial Hall which was eventually opened in 1957. The increasing role of the school and the demand for places in the hostel lead to the building of a third hostel which was opened in 1955. By the time Pearse retired in 1965, 250 pupils out of a total of nearly 600 were boarders. Sporting facilities were enlarged with the swimming pool being enlarged a few years later bringing it to its current "L" shape.

The school's sports teams played against other schools across the entire province. Due to government-imposed restrictions under the Apartheid regime, the school was only permitted to field teams against other schools reserved for whites. As a result, the teams often had to travel 100 km for away matches. At Natal Schools sport tournaments, the school usually competed under the colours of North Natal Schools which fielded teams made up of players from all the North Natal secondary schools. In cultural events however such as debating and chess, the school's opponents were usually the private schools in the Natal Midlands or the state schools in Pietermaritzburg.

=== Subsequent headmasterships ===
Pearse retired at the end of 1965 and Mitchell Lindsay, the former deputy head who had joined the school in 1937, was appointed headmaster. Lindsay's wife, whom he married in 1943 was the former Jean Leiper, also a maths teacher, who served the school from 1937 until 1970. In his first annual report given in November 1966, Lindsay announced that work done by himself and by Pearse had resulted in a grant of R235,000 (£117,500) being made available for a major expansion program which included science laboratories, art rooms, domestic science rooms, an enlarged staff room, changing rooms for day boys and girls, and a separate library. The additions were completed in early 1969 and eased the pressures on the school as the school's role rose from 480 in 1966 to 570 in 1968.

Until the end of the 1960s the school had been an academic high school; technical and commercial subjects being offered at other schools in the province, but none of which were in Estcourt itself. In December 1969 Lindsay announced the conversion of the school from an academic school to a comprehensive school with academic, technical, and commercial subjects being offered alongside each other in Std VII from 1971 progressing to the matric exams of December 1974. The change in the school's emphasis would result in a much larger school as local pupils who were previously educated outside the town could be educated in the town.

== The school coat of arms ==
In 1927 Col. Martin decided that the school should have a coat of arms designed by the College of Heralds. This was unprecedented in South Africa and necessitated correspondence with, amongst others, the provincial administrator, the interior minister, and the prime minister. The arms were eventually granted just before the school's golden jubilee in 1936. The symbolism on the shield is:

- The open book of learning – the heraldic symbol of an academic institute.
- The green vertical triangles (or piles) that allude to the highest peaks of the Drakensberg - Champagne Castle, Giant's Castle and Mont-Aux-Sources, all of which are visible from the school.
- Two wavy white lines that allude to the Tugela and Orange rivers, both of which rise in Mont-aux-Source.
- Blue dots that allude to the tears of Weenen - the scene of a Voortrekker massacre in 1838.

The crest depicts the hill on which the school was built and has decorations alluding to aloe and acacia, plants that are typical of the area. On the hill the English lion holding a flag showing a sheaf of wheat - the symbol of agriculture, a subject pioneered by the school.

The school motto Celer et Audax (swift and bold) was also the motto of Martin's old regiment.

== The Memorial Hall ==
At the end of the Second World War, the South African Government made funds available for the building of school halls on the basis that it would match whatever funds the school was able to raise.

In August 1945, at a meeting attended by parent and the local public, it was decided that the proposed school assembly hall would be a living memorial to the old boys who died on active service during the two world wars and approached the Estcourt Town Council for donations. The town council obliged, but in 1948 the National Party came to power and refused to fulfill the promises made by the previous administration and the hall was not completed until 1957.

In the event, when the railway line that ran alongside the school was doubled, the main road from Estcourt to Loskop was realigned to the other side of the railway line and the school was able to acquire the land that was formerly occupied by the old Loskop Road. The Memorial Hall was built on the site this road. Among the exhibits in the foyer are the helmet and bayonet used by Quentin Smythe, an old boy of the school, who was awarded the VC for bravery in North Africa in 1942.

== Notable alumni ==
- Claude Mulcahy (1892–1916), cricketer
- D. J. Opperman - Afrikaans Language poet and professor of Afrikaans at Stellenbosch University (1960–1975). Opperman attended the Estcourt Government School before it was split.
- Bobbie Heine Miller - In the 1920s, and then into the 1930s, she was a French Open doubles champion, a Wimbledon finalist in doubles and a semi-finalist in Wimbledon singles, who rose to be ranked seventh in the world
- Quentin Smythe - Awarded the VC in 1942
- Berry Versfeld - Nominated Cricketer of the Year by the South African Cricket Annual - 1966
- Korky Paul - Illustrator of children's books.
- Mark Bristow CEO, Randgold Resources
- Henry Honiball - South African Rugby player (1993–1999)
- Sonia Raciti - Miss South Africa 1998
