= Tommy Hepburn =

South African rugby union player (b. 1872, d. 1933)

- Born: Tom Brown Hepburn; 14 February 1872 Shoshong, Botswana
- Died: 13 September 1933 (aged 63)
- School: SACS

Rugby union career
- Position: Centre
Provincial / State sides
Years	Team	Apps	(Points)
1896	Western Province	0	(0)
International career
Years	Team	Apps	(Points)
1896	South Africa	1	(2)
- Correct as of 27 May 2019

Tom Brown Hepburn (14 February 1872 – 13 September 1933) was a South African international rugby union player who played as a centre.

He made 1 appearance for South Africa against the British Lions in 1896 in which he kicked over a conversion.
