= Moto Gold Mines =

Moto Goldmines Limited
- Type: Public
- Traded as: TSX: MGL
- Industry: Gold Mines
- Headquarters: Perth, Australia
- Key people: Reginald N. Gillard
- Number of employees: 160
- Website: www.motogoldmines.com

Gold deposits at Moto were initially discovered in 1903 and mining began in 1905. A colonial state corporation called Kilo-Moto exploited the deposits from 1905 to 1919. The colonial state recruited laborers from rural Africa to work in the mines. In 1919, Kilo-Moto became organized as an autonomous colonial state corporation with a board of directors in Brussels appointed by the Minister of the colonies. This company operated as a private corporation starting in 1926 and survived the handover to independent Congolese rule in 1961, but was taken over by the Zairian state in 1967. The archives of the company up to 1967 are still stored in Brussels.

Moto Goldmines Limited was a gold exploration and mining company with operations in the Kilo-Moto greenstone belt in Haut-Uele Province in the northeast of the Democratic Republic of the Congo. The company's shares were publicly listed on the Toronto Stock Exchange and the London Stock Exchange’s Alternative Investment Market.

Moto Goldmines was acquired by Randgold Resources in 2009, which subsequently merged with Barrick Gold in December 2018. The joint venture developed the Kibali Gold Mine.
