= Berry Versfeld =

South African cricketer

Personal information
- Full name: Berry John Versfeld
- Born: 26 September 1943 (age 83); Ladybrand, South Africa
- Batting: Right-handed
- Bowling: Right arm leg break

Domestic team information
- Years: Team
- 1961–1970: Natal
- 1961–1965: South African Universities

Career statistics
Competition	First-class	List A
Matches	46	2
Runs scored	2,272	31
Batting average	31.44	15.5
100s/50s	4/10	0/0
Top score	201*	31
Balls bowled	222	36
Wickets	3	3
Bowling average	41.33	8.66
5 wickets in innings	0	0
10 wickets in match	0	0
Best bowling	2/35	2/13
Catches/stumpings	38/–	0/–
- Source: CricketArchive, 2 January 2011

Berry John Versfeld (born 26 September 1943) was a first-class South African cricketer who played for Natal and South African Universities and was nominated Cricketer of the Year by the South African Cricket Annual in 1966.

Versfeld was educated at Estcourt High School and at the University of Natal.

Versfeld's first class debut was for Natal against the touring New Zealand team in November 1961, aged 18. He represented both Natal and South African Universities that season, scoring 206 runs at an average of 25.75. The 1962/3 season was a lean season for Versfeld and in the next three seasons he was selected to represent the South African Universities XI each year. He also made one appearance for Natal during this period. In December 1965, with his university studies behind him, he became a regular player for Natal until the end of the 1969/70 season, taking over the captaincy of the team from Jackie McGlew during the 1967/8 season. He retained the captaincy until the start of the 1969/70 season.

Versfeld also played baseball and in 1966 was offered a spot on a Pittsburgh Pirates minor league farm team, but he turned the opportunity down in order to concentrate on cricket in South Africa. After he completed his first class cricket career, he continued his education at Harvard, graduating with an MBA and he settled in the United States.
