= 2008 Christmas massacres =

2008 attacks in the Democratic Republic of the Congo

Christmas massacres
- 2008 Christmas massacres (Democratic Republic of the Congo)
- Location: Several villages in Haut-Uele District
- Date: 24–27 December 2008
- Deaths: 865+
- Perpetrator: Lord's Resistance Army

The 2008 Christmas massacres were a series of attacks in several villages in Haut-Uele District, Democratic Republic of the Congo by the Lord's Resistance Army (LRA) on 24–27 December 2008.

== Attacks ==
The LRA attacks followed the beginning of a joint military operation on 14 December, led by the Ugandan army with support from the Congolese, Southern Sudanese, and Central African Republic armies. The Ugandan army attacked the LRA headquarters in Congo's Garamba National Park, near the border with Sudan.

Following this attack, the LRA dispersed into several groups, each of which targeted civilians along its path. The rebels carried out the most devastating of their attacks from 24 December, waiting until people had come together for Christmas festivities, then surrounding and killing them by crushing their skulls with axes, machetes, and large wooden bats.

Media reports indicated that more than 620 people were killed, many of them hacked into pieces, decapitated, or burned alive in their homes. Several people reportedly had their lips cut off as a "warning not to speak ill of the rebels", and two three-year-old girls suffered serious neck injuries when rebels tried to twist their heads off.

More than 20,000 people were reported to have been displaced by the attacks, and at least 20 children were abducted by the LRA. The United Nations High Commissioner for Refugees (UNHCR) reported that as many as 225 people, including 160 children, might have been abducted and more than 80 women raped.

According to Human Rights Watch, "the similar tactics and the near-simultaneous attacks indicate this was a planned operation meant to slaughter and terrorize as many civilians as possible". The LRA has denied responsibility for the attacks; an LRA spokesman suggested that LRA defectors who had joined the Ugandan army may have been responsible.

== Death toll ==
On 29 December 2008, the United Nations Office for the Coordination of Humanitarian Affairs estimated that 189 people had been killed on 26–27 December. Caritas International has put the death toll at over 400, while Human Rights Watch reported that at least 620 civilians were killed between 24 December and 13 January.

- Faradje: Approximately 150 people were killed on 25–26 December. Rebels reportedly attacked a Christmas Day concert organised by the Catholic Church The UNHCR reported that at least 70 were killed and 37,000 people were forced to flee. Human Rights Watch reported that at least 143 people were killed and 160 children and 20 adults abducted.
- Batande: At least 80 people were killed on 25 December when rebels attacked a Christmas lunch following the morning church service. The men and boys were reportedly taken about 40 meters from the church and killed immediately, then the women and girls were taken into the forest in small groups and many of them raped before they were killed. One witness reported that only six people were left alive in the village. The rebels then ate the Christmas feast the villagers had prepared and slept among the dead bodies.
- Duru: 75 were reportedly killed and a church burned down in the village.
- Bangadi: 48 were killed.
- Gurba: 213 were killed.

== Reactions ==
On 30 December 2008, UN Secretary-General Ban Ki-moon condemned "the appalling atrocities reportedly committed by the Lord's Resistance Army (LRA) in recent days". The United Nations Mission in the Democratic Republic of Congo also condemned the attack and airlifted Congolese soldiers to Faradje to prevent further attacks. The United Nations High Commission for Refugees said the situation was "catastrophic". The European Commission condemned the attacks and called on the LRA "to immediately cease all criminal acts against the innocent people". Caritas International said it was "shocked" by its staff reports of the massacres.
