= Makombo =

Village in Haut-Uele province in the Democratic Republic of Congo

Makombo is a village in the territory of Niangara in the Haut-Uele province of the Democratic Republic of the Congo. It was the site of the Makombo massacre by soldiers from the Lord's Resistance Army between 14 and 17 December 2009.
