= Hasie Versfeld =

South African rugby union footballer

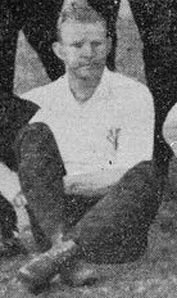
- Born: Charles Versfeld; 24 September 1866 Wynberg, Cape Colony
- Died: 6 January 1941 (aged 74) Cape Town, South Africa
- School: Green Point Grammar School

Rugby union career
- Position: Wing
Amateur team(s)
Years	Team	Apps	(Points)
- Hamiltons RFC
Provincial / State sides
Years	Team	Apps	(Points)
- Western Province
- Correct as of 19 July 2010
International career
Years	Team	Apps	(Points)
1891	South Africa	1	(0)
- Correct as of 19 July 2010

Charles "Hasie" Versfeld (24 September 1866 – 6 January 1941) was a South African international rugby union player. Born in Wynberg, Cape Town, he was educated at Green Point Grammar School before playing provincial rugby for Western Province. Versfeld made his only appearance for South Africa in the 3rd Test of Great Britain's 1891 tour, he played on the wing. His brother, Oupa Versfeld, was also selected to play in the 3rd Test of the series, making the Versfelds the first brothers to represent South Africa. Versfeld died in 1941, in Cape Town, at the age of 74.
