= Mark Cutifani =

Australian businessman (born 1958)

Mark Cutifani CBE
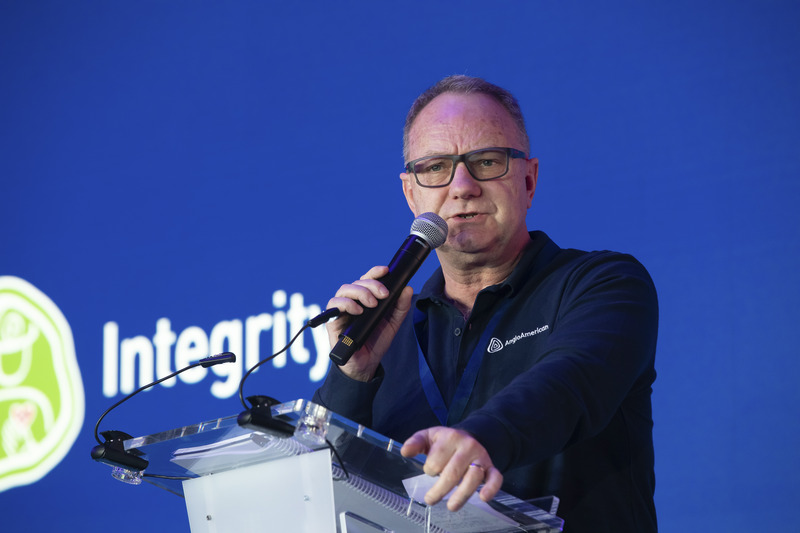
- Mark Cutifani speaking at Anglo American's 2019 Senior Leadership Conference
- Born: 2 May 1958 (age 68); Wollongong, Australia
- Education: University of Wollongong
- Occupation: Businessman
- Title: Chairman of energy transition metals board at Vale Base Metals
- Term: 2023–present

Mark Cutifani CBE (born 2 May 1958) is an Australian businessman and chairman of the energy transition metals board at Vale Base Metals. He is the Senior Independent Director with Laing O'Rourke and chairs the board's Sustainability Committee. He is also a non-executive director of TotalEnergies and chairs the board's Sustainability Committee.

Cutifani is the former chief executive of mining group, Anglo American plc where he also was a member of the board, chairman of De Beers and director of Anglo American Platinum. Cutifani is a founding member of the global Hydrogen Council. Cutifani was formerly CEO of South African gold mining company AngloGold Ashanti.

Cutifani is a fellow of the Royal Academy of Engineering, the AusIMM and the Institute of Engineers. Cutifani is a recipient of the AusIMM Institute Medal, for services to the Australian and global mining industry. Mines and Money Lifetime Achievement Award winner and the Brigadier Stokes Memorial Award (South Africa) for services to South Africa and global mining industry.

He was also awarded a CBE (UK) in the 2024 King's Honors list.

== Early life and education ==
Cutifani was born and grew up in Wollongong, Australia. After leaving high school in 1976, he joined Coal Cliff colliery and enrolled in the University of Wollongong to complete a degree in Mining Engineering. He graduated in 1982 at the top of his class. He was also the winner of numerous awards including the Atlas Copco Travelling Bursary for the top mining student in Australasia in 1982.

== Career ==
=== Early career ===
After working for Coal Cliff, he joined Kalgoorlie Gold Mines, and later the Western Mining Corporation, Normandy Mining and Sons of Gwalia. He became the managing director of Sons of Gwalia in March 2000.

In October 2006, Cutifani was appointed Chief Operating Officer for Inco after the takeover by Vale He led the subsidiary to become Vale's global nickel business, based in Canada.

=== AngloGold Ashanti (2007-2013) ===
On 17 September 2007, he joined AngloGold Ashanti as a director of the company, and was appointed chief executive officer on 1 October that year. Cutifani was credited with dismantling AngloGold Ashanti's significant and toxic hedge book, allowing the company to benefit fully from the much higher gold spot price.

Shortly after joining AngloGold Ashanti, Cutifani introduced a campaign called "Safety is our first value". During his tenure, the fatality rate was reduced by 50%.

=== Anglo American (2013-2023) ===
In January 2013 it was announced that Cutifani would become the new chief executive of Anglo American plc, starting his new role on 3 April 2013, replacing Cynthia Carroll. Cutifani stepped down as chief executive and a member of the Anglo American board in 2022.

Notable improvements per the 2019 annual results:[19]

● Safety – 93% reduction in fatalities and 60% improvement in accident frequency rates.

● Occupational Health – 90% drop in new cases.

● Environmental Incidents - 97% drop in major incidents.

● Production – increased by 12%, whilst reducing the number of assets from 68 to 36.

● Productivity more than doubled during his tenure.

● Unit Costs – improved by 45% in real terms to return the business to a global leadership cost position. In February 2022, in his final results presentation for the group he presented Anglo American's transformation from an average 49th percentile aggregate cost position to the 28th percentile cost position – underpinning the organization's market outperformance over 9 years.

● Mining EBITDA margin - increased by 40%.

● ROCE of 23% improved from 9% at his start.

● Sustainability – announced a Sustainable Mining Plan in 2018 to significantly improve energy and water efficiency, reduce greenhouse gas emissions, and promote biodiversity.

● In response to carbon footprint reductions, Cutifani announced a target of achieving carbon neutrality for Scope 1 and 2 emissions by 2040, with some operations achieving carbon neutrality by 2030.

● Over his 9+ year tenure at Anglo American was the leading major diversified mining company, delivering an average annual total shareholder return of 22%.

=== Vale Base Metals (2023-) ===
In May 2023 it was announced that Cutifani would be appointed as chair of the new Vale Base Metals (VBM) subsidiary of global mining giant Vale. Vale was looking to divest from its tar baby, as early as December 2022. As the time it was a supplier to Tesla and General Motors. Reports were afoot that GM, Mitsui, and the Saudi Public Investment Fund were interested buyers of a 10% stake. Former Tesla executive Jerome Guillen would join the "energy transition board" of VBM along with Cutifani.

Vale spun out its metals business as a separate ringfenced entity headquartered in Toronto, with an independent board chaired by Cutifani. That process completed in July 2023. The unit was then one of the world's largest producers of nickel, copper, and cobalt, and has operations across the globe. The parent company's chief executive Eduardo Bartolomeo stated that Cutifani could help the division explore a future “liquidity event”. In early 2023, the parent company earned 80% of its profits in its South American iron mines, and the balance from its Base Metals group.

== Appointments and current memberships ==
He is also a member of the International Advisory Committee for the Kellogg Innovation Network, a member of the Mining & Metals Steering Board and former Governor (now member) of the Mining and Metals Industry Programme for the

Cutifani is on the Board of the Hydrogen Council, a global initiative of leading energy, transport and industry companies with a united vision and long-term ambition for hydrogen to foster the energy transition. Cutifani is also a member of the advisory board for the Vale Columbia Centre on Sustainable International Investment and an independent Director of The Power of Nutrition; a UK-based charitable foundation and a member of UK Home Secretary's Business Against Slavery Forum.

Cutifani is also an Independent Director of TotalEnergies

- Development Partner Institute - co-founder and current non-executive director
- Power of Nutrition – Chair of Board of Trustees
- Energy Transition Metals Board - Vale Base Metals - Chairman
- International Advisory Committee - Global Foundation - Chair
- Laing O’Rourke - Senior Independent Director and Chair of Sustainability Committee
- Sustainability Committee - Laing O’Rourke – Chair
- TotalEnergies – Director and Chair of Compensation Committee
- Chair – Vale Base Metals
- Advisor – Mevco (Electric vehicle conversion packs for applications in mining)
- Advisor – ERM (Global Sustainability advisor)
- Advisor – Descycle (Technology development in processing technologies)
- AusIMM (Member – International Advisory Committee)

== Previous memberships ==
Cutifani is a former member of the following institutions:

- World Gold Council – Member of Board
- South African Chamber of Mines – Elimination of Fatalities Taskforce Leader (2013).
- Business Leadership of South Africa (BLSA) – Executive Council Member.
- Laurentian University (Canada) – Board of Governors.
- Australian Institute of Mining and Metallurgy:
  - Councillor (South Australia)
  - Member of Ethics Committee
  - Member of Mineral Valuation Committee
- University of Cape Town Graduate School of Business (UCT-GSB) – Member of Advisory Board.
- University of Pretoria – Member of Mining Advisory Committee.
- India-Brazil-South Africa (IBSA) Business Council Steering Committee – Member.
- Western Australian Chamber of Mines – Member of Executive Committee.
- Ontario Mining Association – Member of Executive Committee.
- Minerals Advisory Committee of Canada – Member.
- CSIRO Minerals Sector Advisory Committee (Australia)– Member.
- Foundation and Lead Industry Member for establishment of Centre for Exploration and Mining Innovation (CEMI) in Canada (Laurentian University) in 2006.
- International Council on Mining and Metals. - chair and executive board member
- South Africa's Chamber of Mines (renamed as the Minerals Council South Africa). - Executive Member and President
- International Advisory Committee for the Kellogg Innovation Network. - Member
- Mining & Metals Steering Board - World Economic Forum. - Member
- Mining and Metals Industry Programme - World Economic Forum - Governor and Member
- Global Hydrogen Council - Member
- UK Home Secretary's Business Against Slavery Forum. - Member
- International Council on Mining and Metals. - Chair and Member
- Minerals Council South Africa - President and Executive Member

== Honours, recognition and awards ==
Cutifani was appointed Commander of the Order of the British Empire (CBE) in the 2024 New Year Honours for services to investment in the global mining industry.

Cutifani has won numerous academic and community awards including:

- Western Mining Corporation Awards for best student (1980).
- Bachelor of Engineering (Hons 1), University of Wollongong (1982).
- Western Mining Award for best graduating student (1982).
- Western Mining Award for best thesis in mining (1982).
- Atlas Copco Travelling Bursary for best student in Australasia (1982).
- Seco Titan Coal Industry Award for Excellence in Design (1984).
- Diggers and Dealers Digger of the Year – KCGM (1992).
- United Way Charity Drive Leader – Sudbury, Canada (2006).
- Paul Harris Fellowship Award (Rotary Group) for Services to Community, Sudbury, Canada (2006).
- Institute of People Management (IPM), South Africa – Runner up SA CEO of the Year (2011) in recognition of innovation in change management in a major listed company.
- Honorary Chair – World Mining Congress, Montreal (2013).
- Engineers Australia Magazine - listed amongst the Top 100 influential engineers in Australia (2013 and 2014).
- Silver Award – Thomas Edison Global Innovation Award – Industry Collaboration (Co-chair – Kellogg Innovation Network Development Partner Framework).
- Australia Institution of Mining and Metallurgy (AusIMM) - Institute Medal (2021)
- Australia Institution of Mining and Metallurgy (AusIMM) – Fellow.
- Honorary Doctorate – Business Administration (Safety and Community Engagement), Wollongong University (2013).
- Diggers and Dealers Lifetime Achievement Award (2015).
- The Institute of Materials, Minerals and Mining (UK) – Fellow (2015).
- Engineering Council – Chartered Engineer (2015).
- Honorary Doctorate – Doctor in Laws – Laurentian University in Canada (2016).
- Royal Academy of Engineering – Fellow (2017).
- Technoserve 50th Anniversary Honouree – In honour of “extraordinary leadership in creating sustainable business solutions to end poverty around the world.” Honoured in NYC in October 2018 along with the Chairman of Coca-Cola.
- European CEO Awards – Best CEO in Sustainable Mining (2018)
- Engineers Australia – Fellowship and Chartered status in the Leadership and Management College and APEC Engineer (2019).
- South Africa Mining Industry – Inducted into the Mining Hall of Fame (2019)
- Mines and Money – CEO of the Year; Global Mining Company of the Year (2019)
- AusIMM – Institute Medal (2021)
- Mines and Money – Lifetime Achievement Award (2021)
- SAIMM - Brigadier Stokes Memorial Award (2022)
- Camborne School of Mines – Research Chair in recognition of his contribution to Anglo American and global mining innovation.
- CBE (Commander of the Order of the British Empire) – 2024 King's Honor's list
- Inducted into the US Mining Industry Hall of Fame – 2024 Inductee and Keynote Speaker at the 2024 Award Ceremony in Tucson Arizona
- UK Mining Industry – Lifetime Achievement Award – Cornwall UK Mining Conference Awards – June 2025

== Private life ==
Cutifani has seven children from two marriages.
