= Loftus Versfeld Stadium =

Stadium

Loftus Versfeld
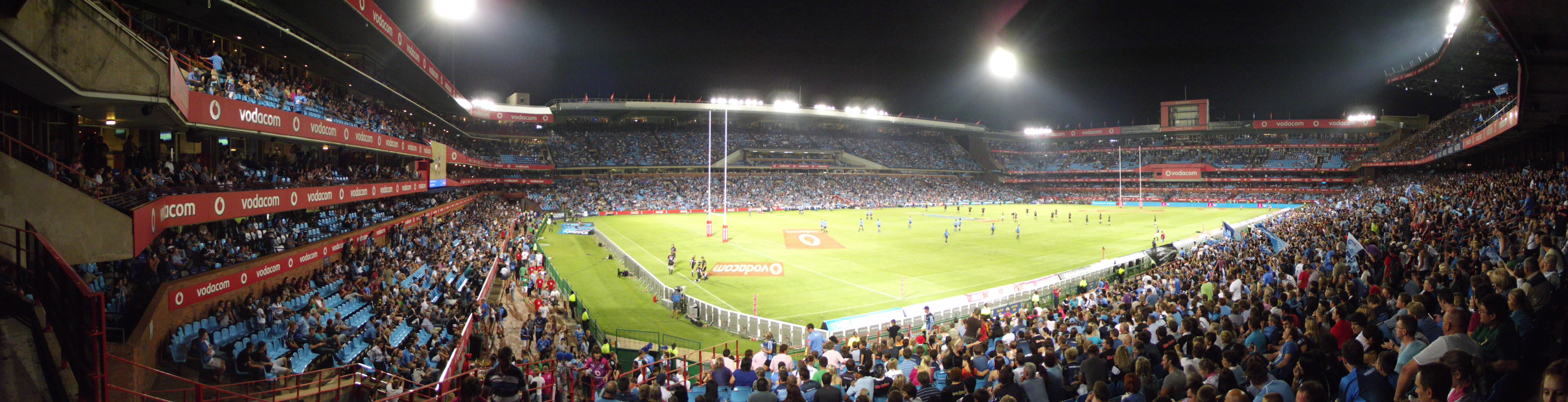
- Loftus Versfeld during a Super Rugby encounter between the Bulls and the Sharks.
- Interactive map of Loftus Versfeld
- Full name: Loftus Versfeld Stadium
- Former names: Minolta Loftus, Securicor Loftus
- Location: 440 Kirkness Street, Pretoria, Gauteng, South Africa
- Coordinates: 25°45′12″S 28°13′22″E
- Owner: Blue Bulls Rugby Union
- Capacity: 51,762
- Surface: Grass
- Public transit: Hatfield (Gautrain station)

Construction
- Groundbreaking: 1905
- Built: 1906–1923
- Opened: 1923; 103 years ago
- Renovated: 1977
- Expanded: 2008

Tenants
- Blue Bulls (Currie Cup); Bulls (United Rugby Championship); Mamelodi Sundowns (Premiership); South Africa national rugby union team (selected matches)

Website
- bullsrugby.co.za/stadium/stadium-history/

Loftus Versfeld Stadium is a rugby stadium situated in the suburb of Arcadia, city of Pretoria in the Gauteng province of South Africa, owned by the Blue Bulls Rugby Union. The stadium can accommodate 51,762 spectators.

The stadium is the home ground of the Bulls franchise of the United Rugby Championship, Blue Bulls union in South Africa's Currie Cup and African Football league champions Mamelodi Sundowns. It also hosted the 2009 Super 14 Final which the Bulls won 61–17 against the Waikato Chiefs, the 2009 Currie Cup final, which the Bulls won 36–24 against the Free State Cheetahs, and the 2024 United Rugby Championship final, which the Bulls lost 16–21 to the Glasgow Warriors.

Also, the South Africa rugby union team has played several test matches at the Loftus Versfeld Stadium. They played New Zealand in 1970, 1996, 1999, 2003 and 2006, Australia in 1967, 1997, 2001, 2005, 2010, 2012 and 2023, England in 1994, 2000 and 2007, and Ireland in 1998 and 2024.

In June 2010, the stadium hosted opening round games and one game of the round of 16 of the 2010 FIFA World Cup.

The stadium is located at an altitude of 1,350m above sea level.

== History ==
The stadium was named after Robert Loftus Owen Versfeld, the founder of organised sports in Pretoria. Through the years the stadium has undergone various name changes as sponsors came and went, though locals have always referred to the stadium as Loftus. From 11 June 1998 to 4 February 2003 the stadium was officially named Minolta Loftus after Minolta became the stadium's name sponsor. Sponsorship was taken over by security giant Securicor, who announced the name Securicor Loftus on 5 February 2003. On 1 September 2005 the renaming process went full circle when cellular provider Vodacom, taking over sponsorship from Securicor, renamed the stadium back to the original Loftus Versfeld.

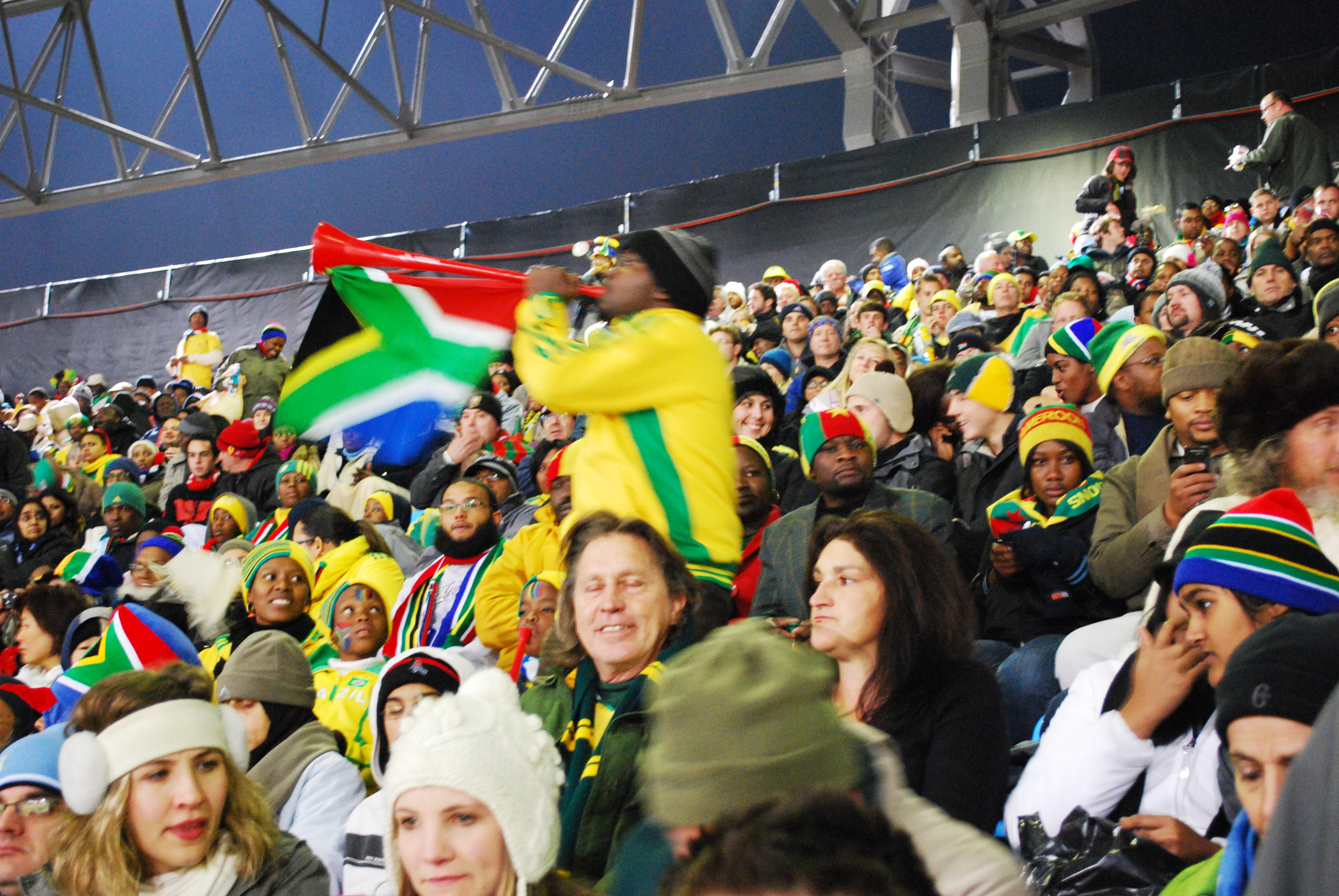
A South African fan plays his vuvuzela, June 2010

The site of the stadium was first used for sports in 1906, and the field was simply called the Eastern Sports Ground. The first concrete structure was erected there by the City Council in 1923. The original structure could only accommodate 2000 spectators and did not have proper sports facilities.

In 1928, mostly because of the All Blacks tour to South Africa that year, the Pretoria sub-union made a large profit which they used to erect changing rooms and toilets.

When Mr Loftus Versfeld died suddenly in May 1932 the Pretoria sub-union renamed the Eastern Sports Ground after him as a tribute. The stadium has been known as Loftus Versfeld Stadium ever since. It has been upgraded on several occasions, including in 1984, when the Northern Pavilion received an upgrade.

== Pitch quality ==
In January 2025, the state of the pitch was criticised after for the top-of-the-table Premiership clash between Mamelodi Sundowns and Orlando Pirates. The pitch had been heavily used for rugby, as well as for other events, prior to the game.

== Tournament matches ==
=== 1995 Rugby World Cup ===
Loftus hosted some matches during the 1995 Rugby World Cup.

Date	Team 1	Result	Team 2	Round	Attendance
26 May 1995	France	38–10	Tonga	Pool D	25,000
30 May 1995	Scotland	41–5	Tonga	Pool D	21,000
3 June 1995	France	22–19	Scotland	Pool D	40,000
11 June 1995	New Zealand	48–30	Scotland	Quarter-finals	20,000
22 June 1995	France	19–9	England	Third-place play-off	45,000

=== 2009 FIFA Confederations Cup ===
Loftus Versfeld was one of the venues for the 2009 FIFA Confederations Cup. It hosted the Group B matches: USA vs. Italy, USA vs. Brazil and Brazil vs. Italy.

Date	Time (SAST)	Team 1	Result	Team 2	Round	Attendance
15 June 2009	20:30	United States	1–3	Italy	Group B	34,341
18 June 2009	16:00	United States	0–3	Brazil	Group B	39,617
21 June 2009	20:30	Italy	0–3	Brazil	Group B	41,195

=== 2010 FIFA World Cup ===
Minimal upgrading was undertaken in order for Loftus Versfeld to qualify as a venue for first and second round matches for the 2010 FIFA World Cup. The floodlights, sound system, scoreboards and stadium roof were improved, as roads and parking facilities around it. While expected to be finished in August 2008, renovation was completed in January 2009.

Date	Time (SAST)	Team 1	Result	Team 2	Round	Attendance
13 June 2010	16:00	Serbia	0–1	Ghana	Group D	38,833
16 June 2010	20:30	South Africa	0–3	Uruguay	Group A	42,658
19 June 2010	20:30	Cameroon	1–2	Denmark	Group E	38,074
23 June 2010	16:00	United States	1–0	Algeria	Group C	35,827
25 June 2010	20:30	Chile	1–2	Spain	Group H	41,958
29 June 2010	16:00	Paraguay	0–0 (a.e.t.) (5–3 pen.)	Japan	Round of 16	36,742

== Concerts ==
The stadium has hosted many musical events including concerts by UB40 and Robbie Williams' Close Encounters Tour on 17 April 2006 with an attendance of over 60,000. Canadian superstar Celine Dion also performed as part of her Taking Chances Tour a two-night stand at the stadium on 16 and 17 February 2008 with a total attendance of about 80,000.

For the 1999 staging of Verdi's Aida, a cast of 100's (locally selected extras) formed the backing for international musicians and singers.

== Boxing ==
On 20 October 1979, South African heavyweight boxer Gerrie Coetzee challenged the unbeaten American heavyweight John Tate for the vacant WBA World Heavyweight title in front of a crowd of 80,000 people. Despite massive support within the stadium Coetzee lost on points to the American. Expensive ring side seats for spectators were laid out flat on the rugby pitch, while fans seated on the stadium's (backward) steel pavilions had to do with binoculars to follow the action.

== Cricket ==
Between 1956 and 1959 six first-class cricket matches were played at the stadium.

== See also ==
- List of African stadiums by capacity
- List of rugby union stadiums by capacity
- Lists of stadiums
