= AngloGold Ashanti =

Gold mining company

AngloGold Ashanti Limited
- Type: Public
- Traded as: JSE: ANG; NYSE: AU
- ISIN: GB00BRXH2664
- Industry: Mining
- Predecessors: Ashanti Goldfields; AngloGold
- Founded: 2004; 22 years ago
- Headquarters: Johannesburg, South Africa
- Area served: Worldwide
- Key people: Jochen Tilk (chairman); Alberto Calderon (CEO)
- Products: Gold; Silver; Uranium oxide
- Revenue: ▲US$4.400 billion (2020)
- Operating income: ▲US$1.918 billion (2020)
- Net income: ▲US$1.000 billion (2020)
- Total assets: ▲US$9.532 billion (2020)
- Total equity: ▲US$4.989 billion (2020)
- Number of employees: 70,000 – June 2020
- Website: anglogoldashanti.com

AngloGold Ashanti Limited is a South African gold mining company, with global operations. With a diverse portfolio of cooperation, projects, and exploration activities, AngloGold Ashanti was formed in 2004 by the merger of AngloGold and the Ashanti Goldfields Corporation.

Based on 2023 production, AngloGold was the world’s 7th largest gold miner, owning 21 mining operations across four continents, listed on the New York, Johannesburg, Accra, London, and Australian stock exchanges, as well as the Paris and Brussels bourses.

== History ==
AngloGold Ashanti was formed on 26 April 2004, after the High Court of Ghana approved the merger of AngloGold and the Ashanti Goldfields Corporation three days earlier. AngloGold had been a gold mining company based in South Africa, majority-owned by the Anglo American group. This came almost a year after the merger was announced on 16 May 2003. In the transaction, Ashanti shareholders received 0.29 ordinary shares of AngloGold for every Ashanti share.

The new company sold its Union Reef Gold Mine in the Northern Territory of Australia in August 2004, followed by the sale of the Freda-Rebecca Gold Mine in Zimbabwe a month later. In late 2007, Mark Cutifani replaced Bobby Godsell as CEO of AngloGold Ashanti, being appointed a director of the company on 17 September 2007 and as CEO on 1 October that year. In 2008, AngloGold produced 4.98 million ounces of gold from its operations, estimated to be seven percent of the global production. In 2009, the company's gold output dropped to 4.6 million ounces. As of early 2008, the company had hedged 11.3 million ounces of gold, under previous CEO Bobby Godsell.

In 2009, AngloGold Ashanti sold its 33% stake in the Boddington Gold Mine in Australia to Newmont Mining for US$1.0 billion and the company's Tau Lekoa Gold Mine in South Africa was sold to Buffelsfontein Gold Mines Limited with ownership being transferred on 1 August 2010.

In May 2010, Russell Edey, chairman of AngloGold since 2002 and, after the merger also of AngloGold Ashanti, was replaced by Tito Mboweni. In October 2010, the company announced the elimination of the last of its hedge book. Under its new CEO, it gradually reduced the hedge to 3.22 million ounces of gold. In October 2010, this remaining amount was paid off with US$2.63 billion, or US$1,300 USD per ounce of gold.

In 2011, AngloGold Ashanti moved into Eritrea to explore the Arabian-Nubian Shield for gold through a 50/50 joint venture set up in 2009 with Thani Dubai Mining. As of the third quarter of 2014, Anglogold was the world's third-largest producer of gold, behind Barrick Gold and Newmont Mining. As of 2019, the company was claimed to be the 'most sophisticated and technologically advanced' mining operations with strict adherence to safety regulations.

In 2020, it sold its last South African mining assets to Harmony Gold for about R4.4 billion. It no longer has any operations left in South Africa but remains listed on the JSE. On 1 September 2020, Chief Financial Officer Christine Ramon became interim CEO following the resignation of Kelvin Dushnisky. There has been speculation that Dushnisky stepped down after shareholders questioned a bonus payment he received from his prior employer Barrick Gold while also taking a signing bonus from AngloGold Ashanti when he was appointed CEO in 2018. Alberto Calderon was appointed Chief Executive Officer and Executive Director of AngloGold Ashanti on 1 September 2021 As of May 2023, AngloGold Ashanti was the world’s fourth-largest gold miner with assets in Ghana, Australia, the US, and Argentina.

In January 2025 a Ghanaian small-scale miners' association reported that soldiers killed nine unarmed people at an AngloGold Ashanti mine in Obuasi. Kofi Adams, chairman of the Ghana National Association of Small Scale Miners, stated that 14 others were severely injured and emphasized that the victims were not armed. However, the Ghanaian army claimed that seven illegal miners were killed in a firefight, alleging that about 60 miners armed with locally manufactured rifles breached the mine's security fence and fired at a military patrol, prompting the shootout. AngloGold Ashanti is a signatory participant of the Voluntary Principles on Security and Human Rights.

== Criticism ==
In August 2008 British charity War on Want published a report accusing Anglo American (who at the time owned 17% of AngloGold Ashanti) of profiting from the abuse of people in the developing countries in which the company operates. The company disclosed itself in 2006 or in 2008 for unacceptable safety performance in its platinum mines. Safety measures were taken. Additionally, in 2005 the staff of the AGA exploration team in Ituri made a US$8,000 payment to the FNI, which had been accused of committing various humans rights abuses.

In January 2011, AngloGold Ashanti was awarded the Public Eye Global Award at the Public Eye Awards hosted with Greenpeace in Davos, Switzerland by the Erklärung von Bern, known in English as the Berne Convention. The award has been interpreted as being for the "most irresponsible company". The nominating organisation, WACAM (Wassa Association of Communities Affected by Mining), said the company had a history of "gross human rights violations and environmental problems".

Colombia's Truth Commission found AngloGold Ashanti responsible for financing paramilitary groups that murdered peasants and community leaders. The same company has been accused of destroying water sources and forcibly displacing thousands of people in the Cauca region.

== Key figures ==
=== Financial ===
Financial figures for the company:

	2004	2005	2006	2007	2008	2009	2010	2011	2012
Revenue (US$ million)				3,113	3,743	3,961			
Gold income (US$ million)		2,393	2,646	3,002	3,619	3,768	5,334	6,570	6,353
Gross loss/profit (US$ million)		109	277	−248	594	−578	1,082	2,623	2,256
Dividends per share (US$ cents)	56	36	62	19	11	17	20	49	36
Total cash cost (US$/ounce)	264	281	308	357	444	514	638	728	862
Total production cost (US$/ounce)	332	374	414	476	567	646	816	950	1,078
Employees	65,400	63,993	61,453	61,522	62,895	63,364	62,046	61,242	65,822

=== Gold production, 2024–2025 ===
AngloGold Ashanti's gold production by mine in 2024 and 2025, in ounces, was:

Mine	Country	AngloGold Ashanti interest	2024	2025
AGA Mineração (Cuiabá) ^{1}	Brazil	100%	271,000	273,000
Cerro Vanguardia	Argentina	92.5%	175,000	179,000
Geita	Tanzania	100%	483,000	492,000
Iduapriem	Ghana	100%	237,000	199,000
Kibali ^{2}	Democratic Republic of the Congo	45%	309,000	303,000
Obuasi	Ghana	100%	221,000	266,000
Serra Grande ^{3}	Brazil	100%	80,000	53,000
Siguiri	Guinea	85%	273,000	289,000
Sukari ^{4}	Egypt	50%	---	500,000
Sunrise Dam	Australia	100%	259,000	232,000
Tropicana ^{2}	Australia	70%	313,000	305,000
Overall	World		2,661,000	3,091,000

- Production is reported on the basis AngloGold Ashanti uses: whole-mine (consolidated) production for the operations it manages, including Siguiri, Sukari and Cerro Vanguardia, in which it holds less than 100%, and only its attributable share for Kibali and Tropicana.
- ^{1} Includes gold concentrate from the Cuiabá mine sold to third parties.
- ^{2} Reported on an attributable basis. Kibali is a joint venture operated by Barrick, in which AngloGold Ashanti holds 45%; AngloGold Ashanti holds 70% of the Tropicana joint operation.
- ^{3} The sale of Serra Grande to Aura Minerals was completed on 1 December 2025; 2025 figures reflect production up to the sale.
- ^{4} Sukari was acquired on 22 November 2024 through the acquisition of Centamin plc. The 2024 Group total includes Sukari only from that date, and the Group totals include Sukari's production only from that date.

=== Fatalities ===
AngloGold Ashanti reports the number of occupational fatalities at its operations. Most of its early fatalities occurred in its South African mines, which accounted for 13 of the company's 16 fatalities in 2009 (2007: 27 of 34, 2008: 11 of 14). A program led by CEO Mark Cutifani aimed at reducing the company's number of fatalities to zero by 2015, but the goal was not met, with 11 fatalities recorded in 2015. The company sold its last South African assets in 2020, and recorded no fatalities in 2019, 2022, 2023 or 2025. Statistics of company fatalities since its 2004 founding:

Year	Number	Change
2004	31	new company
2005	25	19% ▼
2006	37	48% ▲
2007	34	8% ▼
2008	14	59% ▼
2009	16	14% ▲
2010	15	6% ▼
2011	15	no change
2012	18	20% ▲
2013	8	56% ▼
2014	6	25% ▼
2015	11	83% ▲
2016	7	36% ▼
2017	7	no change
2018	3	57% ▼
2019	0	100% ▼
2020	6	up from zero ▲
2021	2	67% ▼
2022	0	100% ▼
2023	0	no change
2024	1	up from zero ▲
2025	0	100% ▼

Figures are occupational fatalities of employees and contractors. Through 2021 they cover the Group, including assets later sold; from 2022 they cover managed operations. The "Change" column is calculated from the annual counts.

== See also ==
- Sam E. Jonah (ACSM), former president of AngloGold Ashanti.
- Gold as an investment

== Sources ==
- AngloGold's response to Human Rights Watch allegations (pdf), 2005.
- "D.R. Congo: Gold Fuels Massive Human Rights Atrocities". Human Rights Watch. 1 June 2005.
- Anglo American: The Alternative Report
