= Randgold Resources =

Jersey-headquartered mining company

- Type: Public
- Traded as: LSE: RRS
- Industry: Mining
- Founded: 1995; 31 years ago
- Defunct: January 1, 2019
- Headquarters: Saint Helier, Jersey
- Key people: Christopher Coleman, Chairman; Mark Bristow, CEO
- Revenue: $1,280.2 million (2017)
- Operating income: $477.9 million (2017)
- Net income: $335.0 million (2017)
- Number of employees: 11,659 (2016)
- Parent: Barrick Gold

Randgold Resources was a gold mining business operating mainly in Mali. Headquartered in Jersey, Channel Islands, it was listed on the London and the NASDAQ stock exchanges until it merged with Barrick Gold in December 2018.

== History ==
The company was established in 1995 and was first listed on the London Stock Exchange in 1997. In 2000 it commissioned the Morila mine and in 2005 commissioned the Loulo mine. In September 2018, Randgold announced a share-to-share merger with Canada's Barrick Gold Corp in a deal worth $18.3 billion. According to this deal, Randgold Resources investors will hold 33% of the combined company. The transaction was completed in December 2018.

== Operations ==
The company's activities are concentrated on the following mines:

- Morila Gold Mine, Mali
- Loulo-Gounkoto mine complex, Mali
- Tongon Mine, Côte d'Ivoire
- Kibali Gold Mine, Democratic Republic of Congo (DRC)

Additional projects are Massawa in Senegal but exploration operations are predominantly undertaken in Mali and the Democratic Republic of Congo. Although registered in Saint Helier, Jersey, Mark Bristow, the CEO, operates mainly out of offices in London, England and the administrative functions are based in Johannesburg, South Africa. Bristow has urged caution about investing in South Africa while the present regime there remains in government.
