= List of Nursing Training Colleges in Ghana =

Nursing Training Colleges in Ghana are tertiary institutions that award diplomas and undergraduate certificates in nursing, midwifery and medical assistance.

College Name	Location	Regions
Nursing and Midwifery Training College - Teshie		Greater Accra
37 Military Hospital Nurses Training College		Greater Accra
Nursing and Midwifery Training College-Pantang		Greater Accra
Agogo Nursing Training College		Ashanti
Ankaful Nursing Training College	Cape Coast	Central
Asanteman Nursing and Midwifery Training College	Amansie East	Ashanti
Bawku Nurses' Training College	Bawku	Upper East
Berekum Nursing and Midwifery Training College	Berekum	Brong Ahafo
Bolgatanga Nursing Training College	Bolgatanga	Upper East
Bolgatanga Midwifery Training College	Bolgatanga	Upper East
Cape Coast Nursing and Midwifery Training College	Cape Coast	Central
Christian Healthcare Training School	Breman Asikuma	Central
College of Integrated Healthcare	Obuasi	Ashanti
Community Health Nurses' Training College	Esiama, Takoradi	Sekondi
Community Health Training College Winneba	Winneba	Central
Fomena Community Health Training College	Fomena	Central
Ho Nurses' Training College	Ho	Volta
Holy Family Nurses Training College	Volta	Volta
Holy Family Nursing Midwifery Training School	Nkawkaw	Eastern
Jirapa Nurses Training College	Jirapa	Upper West
Jomkionr	Ashanti	Ashanti
Kings Health College	Takoradi	Sekondi
Koforidua Nurses and Midwives Training College	Koforidua	Eastern
Korle-Bu Nurses Training College	Accra	Greater Accra
Kumasi Nurses' Training College	Kumasi	Ashanti
KATH Nursing & Midwifery Training College	Kumasi	Ashanti
Mampong Nursing and Midwifery Training College	Mampong	Ashanti
Midwifery Training College	Hohoe	Volta
My Play Room School	Accra	Greater Accra
Narhbita School of Nursing	Tema	Greater Accra
Navorongo community Heath Nurses Training College	Navorongo	Northern
Navrongo Nurses Training College	Tamale	Northern
Nightingale School Of Nursing	Adenta	Greater Accra
Nkawkaw Nurses Training College	Nkawkaw	Eastern
Nurses and Midwifery Training College	Akwapim North	-
Nurses Training School	Akwapim North	-
Nyaniba Health College	Kasoa	Central Region
Offinso Midwifery Training School	Offinso	Ashanti
Pantang Nurses Training College	Accra	Greater Accra
Presbyterian Nursing And Midwifery Training College	Dormaa Ahenkro	Bono
DARDA Health Pre-University	Kasha	-
Pneuma Exousia College	Ashaiman	Greater Accra
Premier Nurses Training College	Ashanti	Ashanti
Richben School of Nursing	Nsuaem	Western
Roman Girls Nursing and Midwifery Training College	Suame	Ashanti
Royals School of Nursing	Ashanti	Ashanti
Sefwi Wiawso Health Assistant School	Wiawso	Western North
Nursing and Midwifery Training College Seikwa		
Sekondi Nurses' Training College	Ahanta West	Sekondi
Seventh Day Adventist Nursing Training College	Kwadaso	Ashanti
St. Karol School of Nursing	Accra	Greater Accra
St. Patrick's Midwifery Training School	Offinso	Ashanti
Sunyani Nurses' Training College	Sunyani	Brong Ahafo
Surebaby Nursing Training College	Sunyani	Brong Ahafo
Tamale Nurses' Training College	Tamale	Northern
Tepa Health Assistant Training	Tepa	Ashanti
Tibie Nurses Training College	Tibie	-
Westernhill School of Nursing	Accra	Greater Accra
Westhill Nursing School	Accra	Greater Accra
Winneba Community Nursing Training College	Winneba	Central
Universal Development Learning College & affiliate	Tema	Greater Accra
University of Jesus of Nazareth Nursing Training Centre	Mankessim	Central
Western Hills Nurses’ Training College	Accra	Greater Accra
College of Health and Well-being	Kintampo	Bono-East

== See also ==
- National Accreditation Board (Ghana), Public Nurses Training Colleges
- National Accreditation Board (Ghana), Private Nurses Training Colleges
