= Justice Akuamoa Boateng =

Ghanaian civil servant and politician

Deputy Minister of Local Government
- In office 1969–1972
- President: Edward Akufo-Addo
- Prime Minister: Kofi Abrefa Busia

Member of the Ghana Parliament for Obuasi
- In office 1 October 1969 – 13 January 1972
- Preceded by: Robert Okyere Amoako-Atta
- Succeeded by: F. K. Mensah
- Parliamentary group: Progress Party

Personal details
- Born: 29 December 1929 (age 96) Gold Coast
- Education: Mfantsipim
- Alma mater: University of Ghana

Justice Akuamoa Boateng was a Ghanaian civil servant and politician. He served as a deputy minister of state in the second republic.

== Education ==
Justice had his secondary education at Mfantsipim School, Cape Coast. He continued at the Local Government Training School in Accra. He went on to Exeter University to study Government and Public Administration. He received his Post-graduate Diploma in 1956 from the International Institute of Social Studies in The Hague under the Netherlands Universities for International Co-operation (N.U.F.F.I.C.) fellowship.

== Career ==
Justice returned to Ghana after his post graduate studies and was appointed clerk of Adansi Banka district council in 1957. He served in the council for two years and joined the Ghana Diplomatic Service (ministry of foreign/external affairs) where he worked for ten years (from 1959 to 1969). There, he worked as an advisor in the ministry and also served in a number of diplomatic missions, some of which include missions in Monrovia (where he was mentioned in a trial of seven young Liberians who were charged with sedition arising out of a plot to overthrow the then head of state of Liberia; President Tubman in September, 1961) and Moscow. In April 1978, he was a member of the Ghanaian delegation to the United Nations Human Rights Conference that was held in Teheran, Iran. Later in the same year, he became the liaison officer between the Ghana Government and the United Nations on the Human Rights Conference on "Civic and Political Education of Women" which was held in Accra, and chaired by Justice Annie Jiagge, an Appeal Court Judge. He once served on the board of the Ghana News Agency in the early 1990s.

== Politics ==
Prior to the inception of the second republic, Justice served in the 1969 Constituent Assembly. Following the Parliamentary elections of August 1969, Justice was elected a member of parliament for Obuasi, the Gold mining District in the Ashanti Region. Later that year he was appointed Deputy Minister for the Ministry of Local Government. He served together with Dr. John Kofi Fynn in this position until 1972 when the Busia government was overthrown. He was incaserated with other top government officials of the Progress Party by the then military government as a political prisoner. He was released after serving 15 months in prison.

In 1996 he contested for the Obuasi seat in parliament on the ticket of the National Patriotic Party but lost to John Kofi Gyasi of the National Democratic Congress.

== Publication ==
After his release from prison in 1973 Justice worked as a free lance writer. In 1977 he published a book entitled; Your New Local Authorities.

== See also ==
- List of MPs elected in the 1969 Ghanaian parliamentary election
- Busia government
