= Adansi West District =

- Former District
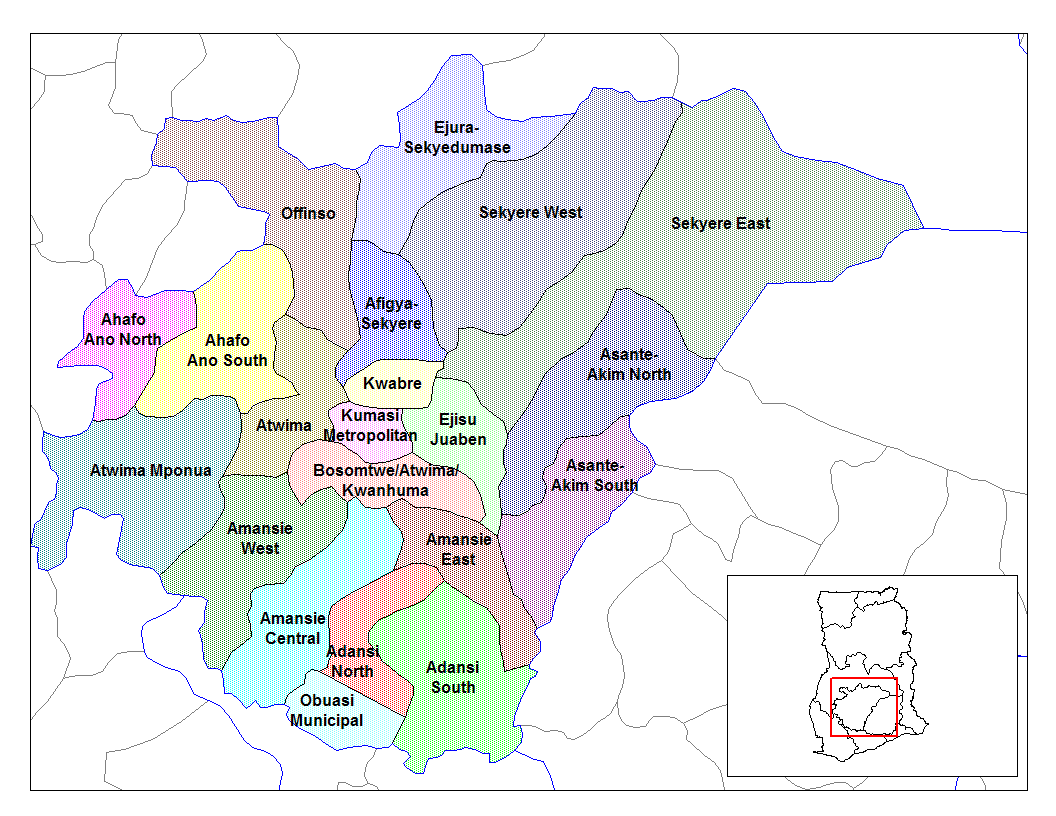
- Districts of Ashanti Region

- Location of Adansi West District within Ashanti
- Coordinates: 6°12′N 1°41′W
- Country: Ghana
- Region: Ashanti
- Capital: Obuasi
- Time zone: UTC+0 (GMT)

Adansi West District is a former district that was located in Ashanti Region, Ghana. Originally created as an ordinary district assembly in 1988, which was created from the former Adansi District Council. However, on 17 February 2004, it was split out into three parts for three new districts: Obuasi Municipal District (capital: Obuasi), Adansi North District (capital: Fomena) and Adansi South District (capital: New Edubiase). The district assembly was located in the southern part of Ashanti Region and had Obuasi as its capital town.
