= Adansi Asokwa =

- District Capital
- Location in Ghana
- Coordinates: 6°14′53.6″N 1°30′40.3″W
- Country: Ghana
- Region: Ashanti Region
- District: Adansi Asokwa District

Government
  - Type: District Assembly
  - Body: Adansi Asokwa District Assembly
  - Chief Executive: Andrew Adu Boahen
- Elevation: 278 m (912 ft)
- Time zone: GMT
  - Summer (DST): GMT

Adansi Asokwa is the capital of the Adansi Asokwa District in the Ashanti Region of Ghana. The district itself was created out of the Adansi North District by Legislative Instrument in 2018. It is located in the southern half of the region on the N8 highway running from Kumasi, capital of the region to Yamoransa near Cape Coast, capital of the Central Region. It is also the main town in the Asokwa Area Council, one of four in the district.

Asokwa is at an elevation of 278m.

Lying to the north of Asokwa are Fomena, capital of the Adansi North district, Brofoyedru and Dompase. To the west are Tewobaabi (1.7 nm), Nyankumasu (2.2 nm), along the road towards Obuasi, capital of the Obuasi Municipal District, a major gold mining centre.
