= Peter Kenneth Owusu =

Ghanaian politician

Peter Keneth Owusu

Member of Parliament for Obuasi constituency
- In office 7 January 1993 – 6 January 1997
- President: Jerry John Rawlings
- Preceded by: F. K. Mensah
- Succeeded by: Anthony Bright Boadi-Mensah

Personal details
- Born: 1946 (age 79–80)
- Education: Wiawso College of Education; University of Cape Coast
- Occupation: Teacher

Peter Keneth Owusu (born 1946) is a Ghanaian politician and member of the first parliament of the fourth republic of Ghana representing Obuasi Constituency under the membership of the National Democratic Congress.

== Early life and education ==
Peter was born in 1946 in Obuasi. He attended the Sefwi Wiawso Training College and the University of Cape Coast where he obtained his Bachelor of Education, Diploma and Master of Education degrees in education, Sociology and Education respectively. He worked as a teacher before going into parliament.

== Politics ==
Peter began his political career in 1992 when he became the parliamentary candidate for the National Democratic Congress (NDC) to represent Obuasi constituency in the Ashanti Region of Ghana prior to the commencement of the 1992 Ghanaian parliamentary election. He assumed office as a member of the first parliament of the fourth republic of Ghana on 7 January 1993 after being pronounced winner at the 1992 Ghanaian parliamentary election held on 29 December 1992. He lost his seat to his New Patriotic Party opponent Anthony Bright Boadi Mensah who claimed 47.70% of the total valid votes cast which was equivalent to 44,721 votes while Peter claimed 27.70% which was equivalent to 25,984 votes in the 1996 Ghanaian general election.

== Personal life ==
He is a Christian.
