= Hannah Awadzi =

Ghanaian journalist, disability rights advocate

- Born: Obuasi, Ashanti Region, Ghana
- Education: Aggrey Memorial Secondary School; University of Ghana
- Occupations: Journalist; disability rights advocate; author; communications consultant
- Employer: Ghana News Agency
- Known for: Advocacy for persons with disabilities and reporting on social issues
- Title: Online Editor
- Awards: Most Outstanding Female Journalist in Ghana (Ghana Women Awards, 2025)

Hannah Awadzi is a Ghanaian journalist, disability rights advocate, author, communications consultant and a psychologist assistant. She serves as an online editor at the Ghana News Agency in Accra. She was named the Most Outstanding Female Journalist in Ghana in 2025 at the Ghana Women Awards. She is recognized for her role as a media professional and an advocate for persons with disabilities with an interest in children with cerebral palsy.

== Early life and education ==
Hannah Awadzi was born in Obuasi in the Ashanti Region of Ghana, which is a gold mining town. She attended Aggrey Memorial Secondary School. Awadzi also pursued higher education at the University of Ghana (UG), where she earned her bachelor's degree in psychology with Linguistics. She holds a Diploma in Newspaper Reporting from the Institute of Commercial Management (United Kingdom), and has been trained as a certified counsellor and licensed as a Psychologist by the Ghana Psychological Council.

She later got a Diploma in Mass communication from the Ghana Institute of Journalism, as well as at the Radio Netherlands Training Centre (RNTC). She completed her master's degree in Contemporary English Studies from the University of Ghana.

== Journalism career ==
Currently, Awadzi practices journalism and communications professionally. She has built a career at the Ghana News Agency (GNA), where she currently serves as their Online Editor. Her work as a journalist has been noted for its empathy, depth and advocacy-driven approach where she focuses on human-centered stories that amplify the voices of the marginalized persons in the communities, especially persons with disability, children with special needs and their families. She has also consistently challenged stereotypes, societal norms, promoted inclusive policies and inspired positive change across Ghana's media landscape.
