= Adansi-Asokwa (Ghana parliament constituency) =

Constituency in the Ashanti Region of Ghana

- constituency for the Parliament of Ghana
- District: Adansi North District
- Region: Ashanti Region of Ghana

Current constituency
- Created: 2018
- Party: National Democratic Congress
- MP: Godwin Animli Dzogbazi-Dorani

Adansi-Asokwa is one of the constituencies represented in the Parliament of Ghana. It elects one Member of Parliament (MP) by the first past the post system of election. Adansi-Asokwa is located in the Adansi Asokwa District of the Ashanti Region of Ghana. Prominent communities in the Adansi-Asokwa constituency include Bodwesango, Fumso, Aboabo, Anhwiaso, Adiemra, Hwiremoase, and Pipiiso.

== Boundaries ==
The seat is located within the Adansi North District of the Ashanti Region of Ghana.

== Members of Parliament ==
First elected	Member	Party
1992	John Kofi Gyasi	National Democratic Congress
2000	Kobina Tahir Hammond	New Patriotic Party
2024	Godwin Animli Dzogbazi-Dorani	National Democratic Congress

== Elections ==
2024 Ghanaian general election: Adansi-Asokwa
Party	Candidate	Votes	%	±%
NDC	Godwin Animli Dorgbadzi-Dorani	14,229	51.73	12.77
NPP	Kobina Tahir Hammond	13,275	48.27	−11.14
CPP	Mensah Abraham Justice	346	1.24	−0.39
Majority		954	3.46	1.83
Turnout		28,307		—
Registered electors				

2020 Ghanaian general election: Adansi-Asokwa
Party	Candidate	Votes	%	±%
NPP	Kobina Tahir Hammond	18,355	59.41	5.04
NDC	Kenneth Boakye Acheampong	12,038	38.96	−1.94
CPP	Mensah Abraham Justice	503	1.63	—
Majority		6,317	20.45	6.98
Turnout		30,393		—
Registered electors				

2016 Ghanaian general election: Adansi-Asokwa
Party	Candidate	Votes	%	±%
NPP	Kobina Tahir Hammond	16,468	54.37	
NDC	Amankwah Evans	12,389	40.90	
Independent	Oduro Richard Anokye	1,352	4.46	
People's National Convention	Alexander Odoi Larbi	80	0.26	
Majority		4,099	13.47	
Turnout				—
Registered electors				

2012 Ghanaian parliamentary election: Adansi-Asokwa Source: Peacefmonline
Party	Candidate	Votes	%
NPP	Kobina Tahir Hammond	15,796	51.06
NDC	Amankwah Evans	14,157	45.76
PPP	Ernest Gyimah	729	2.36
CPP	Francis Owusu-Boamah	255	0.82

2008 Ghanaian parliamentary election: Adansi-Asokwa Source: Ghana Home Page
Party	Candidate	Votes	%	±%
New Patriotic Party	Kobina Tahir Hammond	13,659	55.7	−7.2
National Democratic Congress	Alhaji Abdul-Lateef Madjoub	9,219	37.6	+1.3
Convention People's Party	Owusu-Boamah Francis	1,332	5.4	
Democratic Freedom Party	Amoako Anaafi	314	1.3	
Majority		4,440	18.1	−18.5
Turnout				

2004 Ghanaian parliamentary election: Adansi-Asokwa Source: Electoral Commission of Ghana
Party	Candidate	Votes	%	±%
New Patriotic Party	Kobina Tahir Hammond	15,176	62.9	+18.5
National Democratic Congress	Reverend Evans Amankwa	8,759	36.3	−1.9
People's National Convention	Seidu S. Adams	177	0.7	−4.6
Majority		6,417	36.6	+20.4
Turnout		24,541	89.5	

2000 Ghanaian parliamentary election: Adansi-Asokwa Source: Adam Carr's Election Archives
Party	Candidate	Votes	%	±%
New Patriotic Party	Kobina Tahir Hammond	10,306	54.4	−0.7
National Democratic Congress	Theresa Mensah	7,230	38.2	−16.9
People's National Convention	Nana Yaw Frimpong	1,001	5.3	+4.5
Convention People's Party	Kwame Amoh	241	1.3	
National Reform Party	Peter Kofi Essilfie	92	0.5	
United Ghana Movement	Prince Lawrence	61	0.3	
Majority		3,076	16.2	+5.2
Turnout		18,931		

1996 Ghanaian parliamentary election: Adansi-Asokwa Source: Electoral Commission of Ghana
Party	Candidate	Votes	%	±%
National Democratic Congress	John Kofi Gyasi	10,999	55.1	
New Patriotic Party	Justice Akuamoa Boateng	8,811	44.1	
People's National Convention	Dominic Darpong	168	0.8	
Majority		2,188	11.0	
Turnout		19,978	86.5	

== See also ==
- List of Ghana Parliament constituencies
- List of political parties in Ghana
