= Obuasi Airport =

Airport in Ghana

- IATA: none; ICAO: none

Summary
- Airport type: Private
- Owner: Anglo Gold Ashanti
- Operator: Gianair
- Serves: Obuasi
- Coordinates: 6°17′26″N 1°42′5″W

Map
- Location within Ghana

Runways
Direction	Length		Surface
Direction	ft	m	Surface
12/30	5,250	1,600	Paved

Obuasi Airport is a private airport serving the town of Obuasi in Obuasi Municipal District of the Ashanti Region.of Ghana.

== History ==
Obuasi Airport is a private airfield developed by Anglo Gold Ashanti to service their operations at the Obuasi Gold Mine. The airport was developed from a former airstrip and was inaugurated on 30 August 2012 by Minister of Transport, Collins Dauda. The airport is operated by Gianair on behalf of the owners.

== Airline and Destination ==
Airlines	Destinations
Gianair	Accra

== Accidents and incidents ==
- On 19 March 2003, a Beech 1900D operated by Ashanti Goldfields Corporation with 4 passengers and 2 crew overran the runway after aborting take-off at a speed of 80 knots. The aircraft came to rest in rocky ground near the runway and sustained substantial damage. No fatalities were reported.
