= New Edubiase =

- District Capital
- Location in Ghana
- Coordinates: 6°4′N 1°24′W
- Country: Ghana
- Region: Ashanti Region
- District: Adansi South District
- Elevation: 479 ft (146 m)

New Edubiase is a small town and is the capital of Adansi South, a district in the Ashanti Region of Ghana. it was formerly called the Adansi East district in the Ashanti Region. It shares boundaries on the north with Adansi North and the northeast with the Amansie East District and on the east side shares boundary with Birim East in the Eastern Region, share boundary with Obuasi Municipal from the west and the south with Assin North in the Central Region.
