= Godwin Animli Dzogbazi-Dorani =

Ghanaian politician

Hon. Godwin Animli Dzogbazi-Dorani MP
- Incumbent
- Assumed office 7 January 2025
- Preceded by: K. T. Hammond

Member of Parliament for Adansi-Asokwa
- President: John Mahama
- Vice President: Jane Naana Opoku-Agyemang

Personal details
- Party: National Democratic Congress (Ghana)
- Occupation: Politician
- Committees: Public Administration and State Interests; House Committee

Godwin Animli Dzogbazi‑Dorani (born March 25, 1982) is a Ghanaian politician and Member of Parliament for the Adansi Asokwa constituency in the Ashanti Region. He represents the National Democratic Congress (NDC) in the Ninth Parliament of the Fourth Republic of Ghana. .

== Early life and education ==
Dzogbazi‑Dorani was born on Thursday, March 25, 1982, in Mafi‑Devime, Ghana. He earned a Bachelor of Education degree from the University of Education, Winneba.

== Politics ==
Dzogbazi‑Dorani contested and won the Adansi Asokwa seat in the December 2024 general election, defeating long-serving incumbent K.T. Hammond of the New Patriotic Party (NPP). He won by 14,229 votes against Hammond's 13,275
