= Community Health Nurses Training College, Tanoso =

The Tanoso Community Health Nurses Training College is a public tertiary health institution in the Tano North district of the Brong Ahafo Region of Ghana founded in October 2003. The activities of the institution are supervised by the Ministry of Education. The University of Ghana awards a Diploma in Nursing after students from the institution have successfully completed a three-year nursing training programme. The Nurses and Midwifery Council (NMC) regulates the activities, curriculum and examination. The council's mandate is enshrined under section 4(1) of N.R.C.D 117. Elizabeth Wiafe is the Principal for the college.
