= Adumanu =

Community in Ashanti Region, Ghana

- Country: Ghana
- Region: Ashanti Region
- District: Obuasi Municipal District

Adumanu is a mining community near Obuasi in the Ashanti Region of Ghana.
