= Ellen Louisa Perry =

(1924 –1993) British nurse educator

- Born: 1924
- Died: 1993 (aged 68–69)
- Occupation: Nurse educator
- Honours: FRCN

Ellen Louisa Perry (1924 –1993) FRCN, was a nurse educator recognised for her contribution to ethics, nursing standards and post-registration nurse education

== Training and Career ==
Ellen Louisa Perry was born in Harrow, London in 1924 and undertook her nurse training at St Mary's Hospital Paddington London, qualifying as a Registered Nurse in 1947. She subsequently trained as a midwife at the same institution.

Perry's early post registration career included clinical posts in Paddington Hospital and service with the Queen Alexandra's Royal Army Nursing Corps. She developed her career in nurse education via the Royal College of Nursing (RCN) acquiring the Sister Tutor Diploma of the University of London. Perry gained further hospital based tutorial experience until 1961 when she joined the RCN Institute of Advanced Nursing Education, where she worked for fifteen years on the tutorial staff of the Royal College of Nursing rising to become senior tutor at the RCN.

While in a tutorial role at the RCN Perry worked to develop refresher courses and new courses for clinical instructors and teachers which were offered in 1962 and 1966, also initiating work into the counselling role of the nurse. She also contributed to ethical education her input including speaking at conferences and study sessions. In context of a hemodialysis and transplant conference she offered guidelines to nurses confronted with ethical problems. Perry also collaborated with the University of London revising the Sister Tutor's Diploma and the Diploma in Nursing. She travelled to Nepal in a consultancy capacity with the World Health Organisation.

Perry's final career post was at the South Bank Polytechnic where she lectured on post registration nursing courses. Speaking in context of a specialised course designed for nurses working on wards running Joint Board of Clinical Studies Courses she stated her belief that nurses should demonstrate use of knowledge with perception as a course outcome. During the course of her educational career Perry promoted stronger co-operation and liaison between ward and tutorial staff, noting all nurses are teachers even if unintentionally by example. She noted the nurses' teaching role also encompasses the patient and relatives. While Principal Lecturer in Nursing Studies at the South Bank Perry evaluated the new Diploma in Nursing of the University of London.

As an aside from her educational career in 1983 Perry became secretary of the newly formed RCN History of Nursing Group. She also gained a BA in Philosophy at Birkbeck University of London.

== Honours ==
Perry was awarded Fellowship of the Royal College of Nursing in 1980.

== Publications ==
As of 2026 the following titles published by Ellen Louise Perry were held in the Royal College of Nursing Library:

- Perry, E.L, 1978 Ward management and teaching, 2nd edition (London, Bailliere Tindall & Cassell)
- Perry, E.L., 1974 Clinical Teaching Survey, The Author, available Royal College of Nursing Pamphlet Collection Store Ref: PLT B436
- Perry, E.L., 1968 Ward administration and teaching: the work of the ward sister (Bailliere Tindall & Cassell) available at the Royal College of Nursing History Collection Store, Reference 11M PER.
- Perry, E.L., 1975 All nurses should be teachers, The Author, available Royal College of Nursing Pamphlet Collection Store Ref:PLT B435

== Death ==
Ellen Louisa Perry died after a long illness in 1993.
