= Adansi East District =

- Former District
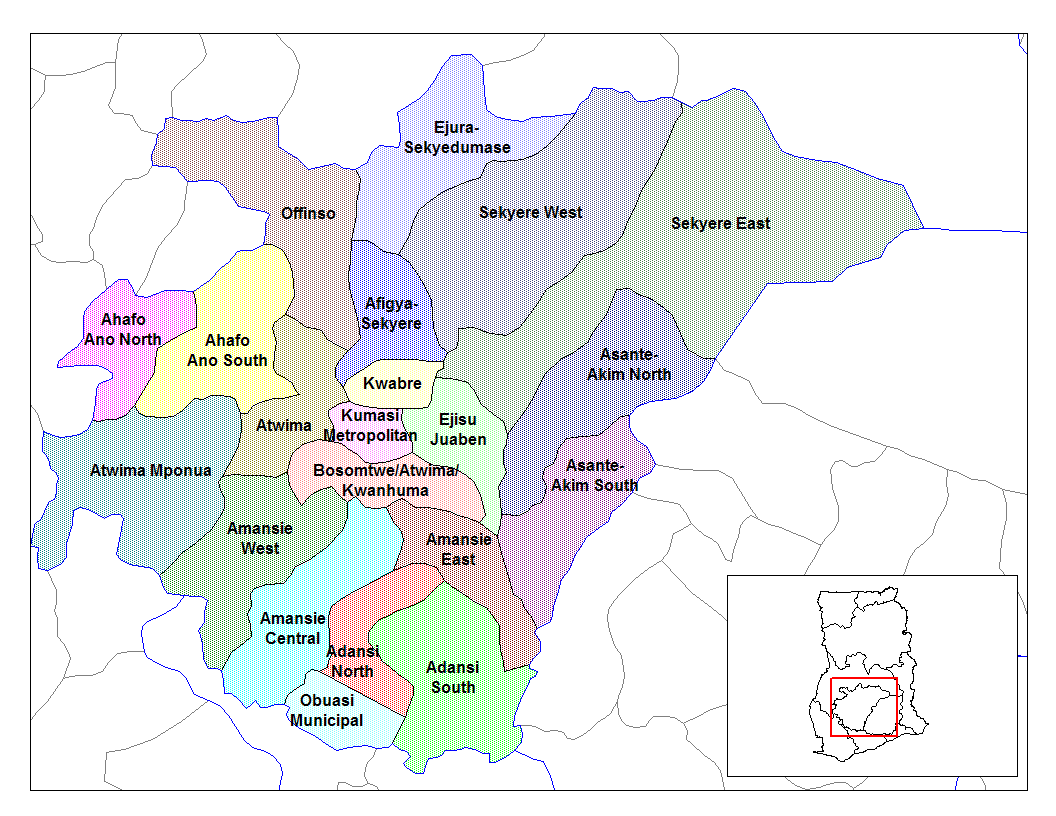
- Districts of Ashanti Region

- Location of Adansi East District within Ashanti
- Coordinates: 6°4′N 1°24′W
- Country: Ghana
- Region: Ashanti
- Capital: New Edubiase

Area
  - Total: 1,380 km^{2} (530 sq mi)

Population (2012)
  - Total: —
- Time zone: UTC+0 (GMT)

Adansi East District is a former district that was located in Ashanti Region, Ghana. Originally created as an ordinary district assembly in 1988, which was created from the former Adansi District Council. However on 17 February 2004, it was split out into two parts for two new districts: Adansi North District (capital: Fomena) and Adansi South District (capital: New Edubiase). The district assembly was located in the southern part of Ashanti Region and had New Edubiase as its capital town.
