= Anthony Bright Boadi-Mensah =

Ghanaian politician

MP for the Obuasi constituency
- In office 2001-January-07 – 2005-January-06
- Parliamentary group: New Patriotic Party
- Constituency: Obuasi

Personal details
- Party: New Patriotic Party
- Occupation: Politician

Anthony Bright Boadi-Mensah is a Ghanaian politician. He represented the Obuasi constituency in the Ashanti Region in the 2nd and 3rd Parliament of the 4th Republic of Ghana as a member of parliament.

== Politics ==
Anthony Bright Boadi-Mensah is a member of the 3rd parliament of the 4th republic of Ghana elected during the 2000 Ghanaian general election. He was also a member of the 2nd Parliament elected in 1996 with 47.70% of the share. He lost the seat in 2004 to Edward Michael Ennin of New Patriotic party.

== Elections ==
Mensah was first elected into Parliament on the ticket of the New Patriotic Party during the December 1996 Ghanaian General Elections for the Obuasi Constituency in the Ashanti Region of Ghana. He polled 44,721 votes out of the 76,429 valid votes cast representing 47.70%.

In the year 2000, Boadi-Mensah won the general elections as the member of parliament for the Obuasi constituency of the Ashanti Region of Ghana. He won on the ticket of the New Patriotic Party. His constituency was a part of the 31 parliamentary seats out of 33 seats won by the New Patriotic Party in that election for the Ashanti Region. The New Patriotic Party won a majority total of 99 parliamentary seats out of 200 seats. He was elected with 46,787 votes out of 72,491 total valid votes cast. This was equivalent to 65.4% of the total valid votes cast. He was elected over Yaw Nsiah Peppah of the National Democratic Congress, Sarfo Kantanka of the Convention People's Party, Mohammed Nurudeen of the People's National Convention, Abdulai Y. Issaku of the United Ghana Movement and Douglas F. Agyemang of the New Reformed Party. These won 18,011, 4,193, 1,636, 806 and 123 votes out of the total valid votes cast respectively. These were equivalent to 25.2%, 5.9%, 2.3%, 1.1% and 0.2% respectively of total valid votes cast.
