= Robert Okyere Amoako-Atta =

Ghanaian politician (1913–??)

Regional Commissioner for the Ashanti Region
- In office 1965 – February 1966
- President: Dr. Kwame Nkrumah
- Preceded by: Stephen Willie Yeboah
- Succeeded by: Brigadier D. C. K. Amenu
- In office 1 November 1961 – 1 October 1963
- President: Dr. Kwame Nkrumah
- Preceded by: Osei Owusu Afriyie
- Succeeded by: Stephen Willie Yeboah
- In office 1 December 1959 – 1 July 1960
- President: Dr. Kwame Nkrumah
- Preceded by: Charles de Graft Dickson
- Succeeded by: Osei Owusu Afriyie

Regional Commissioner for the Brong Ahafo Region
- In office 1 October 1963 – 1965
- President: Dr. Kwame Nkrumah
- Preceded by: Stephen Willie Yeboah
- Succeeded by: Nicholas Anane-Agyei

Minister of Labour and co-operatives
- In office 1 July 1960 – 1 October 1961
- President: Dr. Kwame Nkrumah
- Preceded by: Nathaniel Azarco Welbeck
- Succeeded by: Osei Owusu Afriyie

Member of Parliament for Obuasi
- In office 1954 – February 1966
- Preceded by: New
- Succeeded by: Justice Akuamoa Boateng

Personal details
- Born: Robert Okyere Amoako-Atta; 1913 Akrokerri, Adansi district, Ashanti Region
- Citizenship: Ghanaian

Robert Okyere Amoako-Atta was a Ghanaian politician. During the first republic, he served as the Regional Commissioner (Regional Minister) for the Ashanti Region on three occasions. He also served as the Minister of Labour and Co-operative from 1960 to 1961 and the Regional Commissioner for the Brong Ahafo Region from 1963 to 1965. In 1954, he became the member of parliament representing the Obuasi constituency. He served in that capacity until February 1966 when the Nkrumah government was overthrown.

== Early life and education ==
Amoako-Atta was born in 1913 at Akrokerri, a town in the Adansi district of the Ashanti Region. He was educated at the Akrokerri Roman Catholic Middle School and the Obuasi Roman Catholic Middle School from 1923 until 1931 when he obtained his standard seven certificate. He later studied book-keeping, accountancy and shorthand privately.

== Career ==
Amoako-Atta was employed by the Apam Court in Obuasi as a Registrar-cum-Bailiff in 1932 after undergoing some preliminary training. A year later, he joined the Ashanti Goldfields Corporation at Obuasi as a time keeper. After about a year of service at the Ashanti Goldfields Corporation, he joined the Dunkwa Agricultural department as a shorthand typist and a year later he was employed by the Breman Gold Dredging Company at Ankobra to work as a shorthand typist and accountant. He worked there from 1935 to 1949. In 1949, he moved to Takoradi and took up a job as a secretary and accountant for Messrs. A. E. Senchire and Company, a Timber Merchant in Takoradi. He worked for the firm from then until 1951 when he returned to his home town; Akrokerri to work as a local Court Registrar and Traditional Secretary. From 1954 to 1963 he served as the Town Clerk for the Obuasi Urban Council.

== Politics ==
Amoako-Atta was elected into the Legislative Assembly in June 1954 as the representative of the Obuasi electoral area. He remained in this post until the Nkrumah government was overthrown in February 1966. In parliament, he remained a back bencher until 1956 when he was appointed Ministerial Secretary (Deputy Minister) to the Ministry of Communications and Transport. In 1959 he was appointed Regional Commissioner (Regional Minister) for the Ashanti Region and after serving for seven months he was appointed Minister of Labour and Co-operatives on 1 July 1960. On 1 October 1961 he was reverted to his former post as Regional Commissioner for the Ashanti Region. On 1 October 1963 he was transferred to the Brong Ahafo Region to serve as its Regional Commissioner and in 1965 he was posted back to the Ashanti Region as the Regional Commissioner. He remained in that office until the coup in 1966.

== Personal life ==
Amoako-Atta's first marriage was to Adwoa Amanado in 1937 and the marriage subsisted for fifteen years. Together, they had four children. In 1951, he married Madam Esi Gyamera and together, they had seven children. He also had two other children with two other women he did not marry. His hobbies were playing tennis, dancing and read.

== See also ==
- List of MLAs elected in the 1954 Gold Coast legislative election
- List of MLAs elected in the 1956 Gold Coast legislative election
- List of MPs elected in the 1965 Ghanaian parliamentary election
- Obuasi (Ghana parliament constituency)
