= Obuasi Senior High Technical School =

Location
- P. O. Box 175; Obuasi, Obuasi Municipal District; Ashanti Region; Obuasi; Ghana; 6.1963°N 1.6842°W

Information
- Type: Public high school
- Motto: Capita Digitis Collaborant
- Denomination: Public Owned
- Established: 21 November 1965
- Status: Active
- School district: Obuasi Municipal District
- Oversight: Ministry of Education
- Gender: Co-educational
- Age: 14 to 18
- Sports: Yes

Obuasi Senior High Technical School is a co-educational second-cycle public high school institution in Obuasi in the Ashanti Region of Ghana. The school is located in between the two towns, Gausu and Koffikrom. It was established by Osagyefo Dr Kwame Nkrumah in 1965 as Government Secondary Technical School, which was an all-boys institution offering science and technical programmes only, the first of its kind in the northern sector of Ghana. In 1990, Obuasi Secondary Technical School was converted into a mixed-sex school to aid the "more girls in science" campaign by the government of Ghana.

The school in 2019 reached the quarter-finals of the National Science and Maths Quiz Competition after beating St Francis Xavier Minor Seminary and Krobo Girls SHS. The school came up first with 44pts followed by St Francis with 18 pts and Krobo with 16pts. Masters Kojo Daniel Eshun and Lawrence Adjei were the proud contestants for that day. Obuasi Senior High Technical School won the Ashanti regional Milo soccer competition in 2005 and 2015. In the Zonal Inter Colleges Athletics competition, they have won several times Students of the school were claimed to have created 'a touchless bin' in the fight against COVID-19. Also, it was the first school to win the maiden Sci-Tech Innovation Challenge, 2021.

== See also ==
- Education in Ghana
- List of senior high schools in the Ashanti Region
