= Obuasi (Ghana parliament constituency) =

Ghana parliament constituency

- constituency for the Parliament of Ghana
- District: Obuasi Municipal District
- Region: Ashanti Region of Ghana

Current constituency
- Party: New Patriotic Party
- MP: Edward Michael Ennin

The Obuasi Constituency was a constituency in the Obuasi Municipal District in the Ashanti Region of Ghana. In 2003, the Electoral Commission of Ghana, created 30 new constituencies in the country by dividing certain already existing ones. With the Obuasi constituency, it was split into the Obuasi and Akrofuom with Obuasi and Akrofuom as their headquarters. The Obuasi constituency was further split in 2011 into the Obuasi West and Obuasi East constituencies.

== Members of Parliament ==
| Election | Member | Party | Term |
|---|---|---|---|
| 1954 | Robert Okyere Amoako-Atta | Convention People's Party | 1954-1966 |
| 1969 | Justice Akuamoa Boateng | Progress Party | 1969‐1972 |
| 1979 | F. K. Mensah | People's National Convention | 1979-1981 |
| 1992 | Peter Keneth Owusu | National Democratic Congress | 1992-1996 |
| 1996 | Anthony Bright Boadi-Mensah | New Patriotic Party | 1996‐2004 |
| 2004 | Edward Michael Ennin | New Patriotic Party | 2004‐2012 |

The constituency was split in 2012 into the Obuasi East and Obuasi West constituencies.

== See also ==
- List of Ghana Parliament constituencies
