= Associate of Science in Nursing =

Tertiary education nursing degree

An Associate of Science in Nursing (ASN) is a tertiary education nursing degree which typically takes 2–3 years to complete. In the United States, this type of degree is usually awarded by community colleges or similar nursing schools. Some four-year colleges also offer this degree. Students awarded an Associate of Science in Nursing are qualified to sit for the NCLEX-RN and apply for licensure as a Registered Nurse.

Students enrolled in an Associate of Science in Nursing program would take a variety of nursing courses in medical and surgical nursing, labor and delivery, pediatrics, psychiatric nursing, emergency medicine, orthopedics, and many others. The curriculum will also require supervised clinical experience in multiple specialties.

Some hospital-based nursing schools that once granted diplomas have altered their curriculum to offer associate degrees.

Students that graduate with an Associate of Science in Nursing (ASN) and receive licensure as a Registered nurse can practice in a variety of occupations. This may include hospitals, rehab facilities, home healthcare services, and nursing facilities. There are also many outpatient settings such as clinics, schools, and physicians' offices.

== Common program prerequisites ==
Many Associate of Science in Nursing programs require a series of courses to be completed prior to enrollment in clinical classes. This may include science based classes such as chemistry, anatomy, physiology, microbiology, or general biology. Mathematics courses such as statistics or math for health sciences are also common requirements. A variety of other courses including nutrition, English composition, or history may be necessary for some programs. Schools may also require students to have an active Certified nursing assistant license in order to apply and enroll in the nursing program.

== Similar degrees ==
- Diploma in Nursing (DN): an entry-level tertiary education nursing credential.
- Associate Degree in Nursing (ADN): a professional nursing degree earned in two to three years.
- Associate of Applied Science in Nursing (AAS)
- Associate of Arts in Nursing (AAN)
- Associate of Nursing (AN)
- Associate of Science in Nursing (ASN)

== RN to BSN ==
After graduating from an Associate of Science in Nursing program and receiving licensure as a Registered nurse have the opportunity to earn a Bachelor's in Science of Nursing through an RN to BSN program. This program is typically shorter than traditional BSN programs offered at four year universities, as students have already completed a variety of nursing courses. Many programs can be completed in an online setting in as short as twelve months. These programs may include courses in healthcare innovations, management, leadership, ethics, community health, and a capstone course.

== Nursing in the United Kingdom ==
Nursing in the United Kingdom requires all students to obtain a full bachelor's degree, and there is no state exam on completion of the course. The Nursing and Midwifery Council is responsible for approving educational programs and organizing them into four branches including, Adult nursing, Child nursing, Mental health nursing, and Learning disabilities nursing.

Bachelor's degree programs leading to Nurse registration in the United Kingdom are typically 3 years in length. This will include a variety of theory subject modules taught over 2,300 hours as well as 2,300 hours of supervised clinical experience. Lesser awards such as Higher education diplomas in nursing are no longer offered, all nurses study to bachelor's degree Level.

== Nursing in Australia ==
Nursing education in Australia is divided into two levels. Registered nurses (RN) must hold a three-year bachelor's degree, whereas enrolled nurses (EN) must complete an 18-month Diploma of Nursing. Enrolled nurses must practice with the guidance and supervision of registered nurses. Nursing in Australia does not allow medical professionals to carry a license, they are registered to practice in a specific state or territory. Registered nurses in Australia engage in a similar educational pathway compared to the Associate of Science in Nursing in the United States. Both programs use an accelerated form of study to allow for 2–3 years of education.

== See also ==
- Diploma in Nursing
- Bachelor of Science in Nursing
- Master of Science in Nursing
- Doctor of Nursing Science
- Nurse education
- Nursing school
