= Nurses Training College, Jirapa =

The Jirapa Nurses' Training College is public tertiary health institution in the Jirapa in the Upper West Region of Ghana. The activities of the institution is supervised by the Ministry of Education. The University of Ghana awards a Diploma in Nursing after students from the institution have successfully completed a three-year nursing training programme. The institution is accredited by the National Accreditation Board. The Nurses and Midwifery Council (NMC) is the regulates the activities, curriculum and examination of the student nurses and midwives. The council's mandate Is enshrined under section 4(1) of N.R.C.D 117.
