= Gianair =

Ghanaian airline

IATA	ICAO	Call sign
-	GIN	GIANAIR
- Founded: 2009
- Commenced operations: 2010
- Operating bases: Accra International Airport
- Fleet size: 3
- Destinations: 1
- Headquarters: Accra, Greater Accra, Ghana
- Key people: Roberto Billia (Managing Director)
- Website: gianairltd.com

Gianair is a Ghanaian airline with its head office in Accra, Ghana, and its main base at Accra International Airport in Accra.

== History ==
Gianair was incorporated on 29 May 2009 and commenced flight operations in April 2010. The airline specialises in executive and private charter, emergency medical rescue and ad hoc cargo operations.

Gianair also manages Obuasi Airport on behalf of the owners, Anglo Gold Ashanti.

== Fleet ==
=== Current fleet ===
As of July 2026, Gianair operates the following aircraft:

Aircraft	In service	Orders	Passengers
BAe Jetstream 32	3	—	
Total	3	—	

=== Former fleet ===
As of August 2025, Gianair operated 3 BAe Jetstream 32.

== Destinations ==
Gianair operates the following scheduled services as of March 2021.

- Accra – Accra International Airport
- Obuasi - Obuasi Airport
