= Tamale, Nurses Training College =

The Tamale Nurses Training College is a public tertiary health institution in Tamale in the Northern Region of Ghana. The college is in the Tamale Metropolitan Assembly. The activities of the institution are supervised by the Ministry of Health. The University of Ghana awards a Diploma in Nursing after students from the institution have successfully completed a three-year nursing training programme. The institution is accredited by the National Accreditation Board. The Nurses and Midwifery Council (NMC) is the regulates the activities, curriculum and examination of the student nurses and midwives. The council's mandate is enshrined under section 4 (1) of N.R.C.D 117.
