= Geology of Ghana =

Location of the Jubilee Field offshore Ghana

The geology of Ghana is primarily very ancient crystalline basement rock, volcanic belts and sedimentary basins, affected by periods of igneous activity and two major orogeny mountain building events. Aside from modern sediments and some rocks formed within the past 541 million years of the Phanerozoic Eon, along the coast, many of the rocks in Ghana formed close to one billion years ago or older leading to five different types of gold deposit formation, which gave the region its former name Gold Coast.

== Stratigraphy, tectonics and geologic history ==
Ancient rocks from the Paleoproterozoic, Neoproterozoic and perhaps early Paleozoic cover almost all of Ghana, except near the coast where Paleozoic, Mesozoic and Cenozoic rocks are common.

Main Precambrian rock units include the metamorphosed and folded Dahomeyan, Birimian, Tarkwaian System, Togo Series, and the Buem Formation. Paleozoic rocks include the Voltaian System, and the Sekondi-Accraian Formations.

=== Paleoproterozoic (2.5-1.6 billion years ago) ===
Paleoproterozoic rock units belonging to Birimian Supergroup, common across West Africa, dominate northwest and southwest Ghana. The Birimian Supergroup has two units, one a succession of sedimentary rocks including phyllite, tuff and greywacke overlain by conglomerate, sandstone and shale and the other a volcanic tholeiitic magma series. Originally, geologists separated the units into the Lower Birimian and the Upper Birimian, but subsequent research found that the volcanic rocks form several hundred kilometer belts within the larger supergroup, with low-grade metamorphism of the tholeiitic lava rocks.

The volcanic belts from north to south are the Lawra Belt, Bole-Navrongo Belt, Sefwi Belt, Asankrangwa Belt, Ashanti Belt and Kibi-Winiba Belt. Except for the Lawra Belt, they all trend northeast-southwest. Between the different belts are basins filled with dacite, argillite, volcaniclastic and granitoid rocks with isocline folding. At the transition between the basins and the volcanic belts are small outcrops of chert, carbonates and manganese-rich sediments, which are inferred to be the exhalative remains of the eruptions that formed the volcanic belts.

The volcanic and sedimentary rocks were folded during the Eburnean orogeny 2.2 to 2.0 billion years ago and intruded by granitoids. The orogeny also uplifted and eroded the rocks, filling a large graben with a folded molasse series of new sedimentary rocks, known as the Tarkwaian Group. Around the same time, the Birimian Supergroup was intruded again, this time by Cape Coast type batholith granites and granodiorite, along with the Winneba type which has an Archean sial origin from the upper most layer of the mantle. Ghana also has a few other types of granites from this time period, including the Dixcove type, which formed an unfoliated intrusion in the volcanic belt and the rare Bongo potassic granitoids, which formed after the Eburnean orogeny.

=== Neoproterozoic (1 billion-539 million years ago) ===
In the Neoproterozoic, Ghana was affected by the Pan-African orogeny. Today, the Pan-African mobile belt terrane spans eastern and southeastern Ghana, with several different units. The Dahomeyan System comprises both mafic and felsic gneiss while the Togo Series includes quartzite, shale and small amounts of serpentinite. The Buem Group is a mix of sediments and igneous rocks, including shale, sandstone, basalt, trachyte and volcanoclastic rocks.

The Volta Basin formed during the Neoproterozoic and includes the one kilometer thick sandstones and claystones of the Bambouaka Supergroup, which emplaced between 1.1 billion and 700 million years ago. In the Neoproterozoic, the Snowball Earth event led to widespread glaciation in what is now Africa. Glacial erosion created an unconformity between the Bambouaka Supergroup and the Pendjari Supergroup (also known as the Oti Supergroup), which in some cases is directly atop more ancient crystalline basement rock. The 2.5 kilometer thick, 600 to 700 million year old Pendjari Supergroup has tillite and dolomitic limestone, rich in barite and silixite at its base and siltstone and argillite in its upper layers. The third major unit in the Volta Basin is the Tamale Supergroup, with a thickness of 500 meters, claystone and siltstone at its base, giving way to coarse sandstone. Geologists debate the age of the Tamale Supergroup which may have formed in the Late Neoproterozoic or possibly in the Cambrian of the early Paleozoic era.

=== Phanerozoic (539 million years ago-present) ===
The Phanerozoic, the current eon in which multicellular life became commonplace is mainly recorded along the coast of Ghana. The Accraian Series deposited in the Early Devonian and Middle Devonian while the Sekondian Series formed between the Middle Devonian and the Early Cretaceous, overlapping with the Late Jurassic to Early Cretaceous Amisian Group. The Late Cretaceous Apollonian Group is among the most recent rock units. The past 66 million years of the Cenozoic are mainly recorded with marine, lagoonal and riverine sedimentary rocks as well as with unconsolidated sediments that cover most of the country and form soils.

== Hydrogeology ==
The three major units of the Volta Basin are important aquifers in eastern Ghana with very low, if any, intergranular permeability. The middle and upper Pendjari Supergroup and Obosum Group sandstones, mudstones and siltstones typically have low mineralization, but contain some fluoride, while the deeper Bambouaka Supergroup rocks have generally high sulfate, iron and manganese concentrations and in some places fluoride and high salinity. Although generally impermeable, fractured rock aquifers in basement rocks cover most of southern and western Ghana with slight acidity, low salinity, low hardness and low iodine, but high fluoride. In some places in southwest Ghana, groundwater from weathered basement rock contains high levels of arsenic associated with gold in mineralized veins.

Groundwater recharge is poorly studied in Ghana except for 15 monitored wells in the northeast.

== Natural resource geology ==
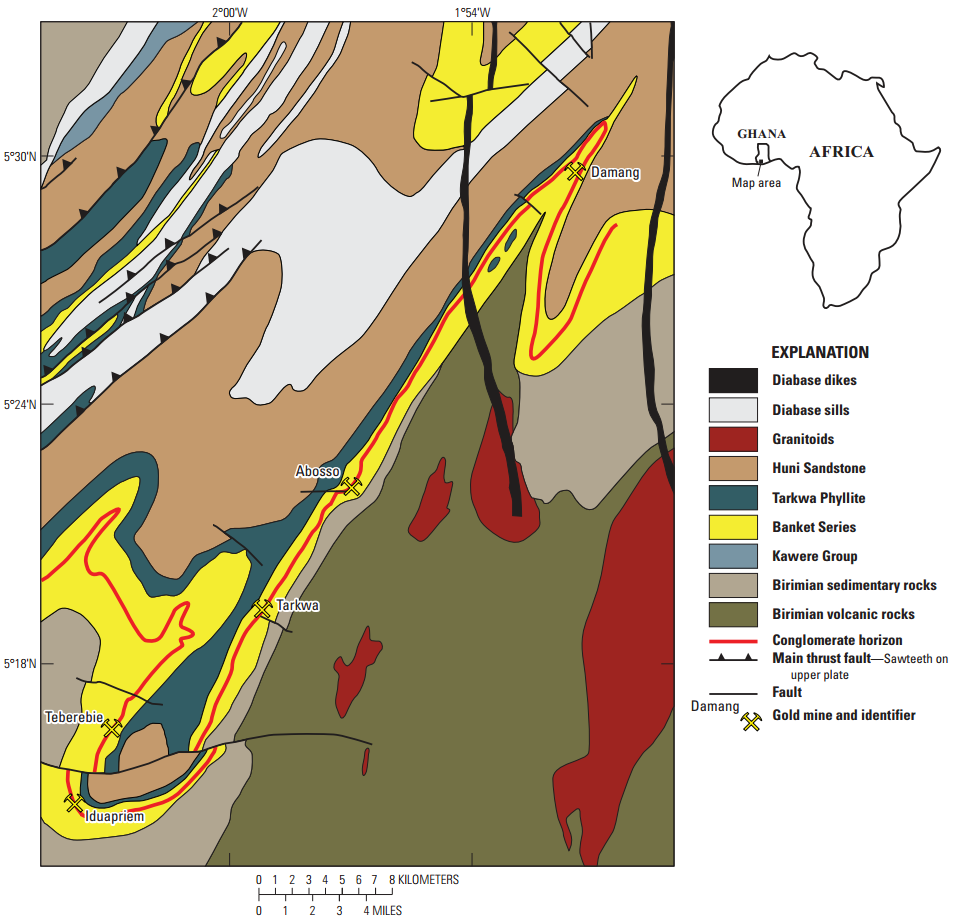
Geological map of the Tarkwa gold district in Ghana showing significant folding and faulting

Gold plays an important role in the economy of Ghana, with up to 1500 tons of gold produced throughout its history. Ghana has five major types of gold deposits. Native gold in steeply dipping quartz veins in shear zones at the margins of Birimian basins, arsenopyrite in sulfur bodies, disseminated mineralization in basin granitoid rocks and alluvial placer gold in river deposits in gravel are major sources of gold. In some cases, ancient placer gold has mineralized and reconstituted along with other minerals such magnetite and hematite in the quartz-pebble conglomerates of the Tarkwaian Group.

From the late 15th century until the mid 19th century, two-thirds of Africa's gold production was estimated to have originated from the Gold Coast. Annual production in the early 1980s was 12,000-15,000 kg. The major primary gold lodes are found in the shear zone between the Lower Birimian phyllites and Upper Birimian greenstones, and consist of quartz veins and lenticular reefs. The gold is usually accompanied with arsenopyrite. Mines along the west side of the Tarkwa syncline include the Obuasi Gold Mine, and those located at Prestea and Konongo. Sedimentary gold is found in the Banket conglomerate near the base of the Tarkwaian. This includes the Iduapriem Gold Mine, Teberebie Mine, and those located at Tarkwa, and Abosso, located along the eastern margin of the Tarkwa syncline. Accompanying minerals include rutile, zircon, and detrital hematite, all within gravel horizons. Placer gold is mainly dredge mined along the Ofin River at Dunkwa-on-Offin. Additionally, eluvium, beach sands, terraces, and Pleistocene stream sediments contain alluvial gold.

Significant diamond deposits are found in river gravels in the central and eastern part of Ghana, although the country does not have kimberlite pipes where diamonds formed in the geologic past. Awaso, in southwest Ghana hosts a bauxite mine run by the Ghana Bauxite Company. The bauxite formed from the weathering of Paleoproterozoic phyllite. Nsuta in the Sekyere Central District of the Ashanti Region has a manganese oxide and carbonate mine. The country also has small, poorly researched deposits of asbestos, chromite, andalusite, mica, barite, cassiterite, columbite, monazite, beryl, spodumene and molybdenite. It also has nepheline syenite and on-shore alluvial deposits of rutile and ilmenite.

Ghana's sedimentary rock formations include many small deposits of limestone, but few of these are extensive enough for long-term exploitation. Limestone is being extracted at a modern quarry near Oterkpolu.

Ghana has widespread quarrying of sand, gravel, kaolin and other clay deposits for road and building construction as well as brick production.

== See also ==
- Mining in Ghana
- West African Craton
- Geography of Ghana
