= Obuasi West (Ghana parliament constituency) =

Constituency in the Ashanti Region of Ghana

- constituency for the Parliament of Ghana
- District: Obuasi Municipal District
- Region: Ashanti Region of Ghana

Current constituency
- Party: New Patriotic Party
- MP: Kwaku Kwarteng

Obuasi West is one of the constituencies represented in the Parliament of Ghana. It elects one Member of Parliament (MP) by the first past the post system of election

Kweku Kwarteng is the member of parliament for the constituency. He was elected on the ticket of the New Patriotic Party (NPP) won a majority of 31,101 votes out of 48,254 to become the MP. He had also represented the constituency in the 4th Republic parliament.

== See also ==
- List of Ghana Parliament constituencies
