= Ellen Boakye =

Ghanaian cardiologist

- Born: Kokofu, Ghana
- Education: University of Ghana Medical School
- Occupation: Pediatric cardiologist

Ellen Boakye is a Ghanaian pediatric cardiologist. She is known for winning 18 awards for distinguishing herself in her course of study.

== Education ==
Boakye was born in Kokofu in the Ashanti Region of Ghana. She had her primary and secondary level education at Petra International School in Breman Read and the Yaa Asantewaa Secondary School in Kumasi respectively. She then studied further at the University of Ghana Medical School. During her Bachelor of Science degree graduation, she won 8 out the 9 awards presented. In 2017, she won 10 awards at the Vice-Chancellor's Academic Award Ceremony held at the Great Hall of the University of Ghana. She is known to have won the highest number of awards that year, having swept 10 awards out of the 156 awards given out.

== Career ==
She currently works as one of the few pediatric cardiologists in Ghana.

== Awards ==
She has won several other awards which includes:

- 2017 - The People's Choice Practitioners Awards
- 2017 - HELEH Africa People's Choice Practitioners Honours
