= Kokofu =

- Town
- Location within Ghana
- Coordinates: 6°30′N 1°32′W
- Country: Ghana
- Region: Ashanti Region
- District: Bekwai Municipal
- Elevation: 735 ft (224 m)
- Time zone: GMT
  - Summer (DST): GMT

Kokofu is a town in the Bekwai Municipal district, a district in the Ashanti Region of Ghana.

== History ==
There are many variations on the origin of Kokofu. The following information is taken from Ghana Place Names.

1. "When Kobia Anguanfi came to the throne, he said that Assumya .. was not a convenient place for him to dwell with his families so he sent his hunter to seek for a place so that they may dwell there. This hunter in searching for a place, found a gardiner by name Kokor who had made a large garden or Affuo (the Ashanti name for a garden). So this hunter returned and told the King and so the king used to make a promenade to the garden of Mr. Kokor. When they were accustomed of the place, the king said to his families that he will go and make a dwelling at Kokor Affuo, i.e. the garden of Kokor, so they all went and dwell there. When they had settled there, they at first called the place 'Kokor Affuo', and afterwards the place came to be called Kokofu."

2. "the name Kokofu originated from 'Koo-ko-Afuom' meaning soft cocoyam farm"

3. Ellis gives; "Koko-fu probably means People of the Hill (Koko), there being a well-marked range of hills in the Kokofu District." However Ellis's etym. is not always reliable.

4. R.S.Rattray: "The first person of the Oyoko clan to come from the ground at 'Santemanso was Ankyewa Nyame. She .. had a daughter, Pinamin Panyin. .. When the Oyoko people first came from Omanso to settle at the place now called Kokofu, they found a certain hunter, by name Odabo, and his mother, Aberewa Pofi, in possession of the land. Pinamin Panyin requested permission to settle there and make a farm. She found, on trying to do so, that the weeds sprang up very quickly, and also that the soil was very red; hence she called the place Kokofu (red and weedy)." ("Ashanti Law and Constitution", p. 198).

== Education ==
Kokofu is known for the Oppong Memorial Secondary School. The school is a second cycle institution.

KOKOFU is now a semi developed town within the Bekwai municipality. It has a one tertiary institution- Kokofu Nursing Training College which has over some period now, produced a lot of professional nurses for the country.

== Notable people ==
- Ellen Boakye, pediatric cardiologist
- Kwaku Kwarteng, civil engineer, economist, and politician
- Kofi Obiri Yeboah, lawyer and politician

== See also ==
- Bekwai (Ghana parliament constituency)
