= Kwaku Kwarteng =

Ghanaian civil engineer and politician (born 1969)

The Honourable Kwaku Kwarteng MP
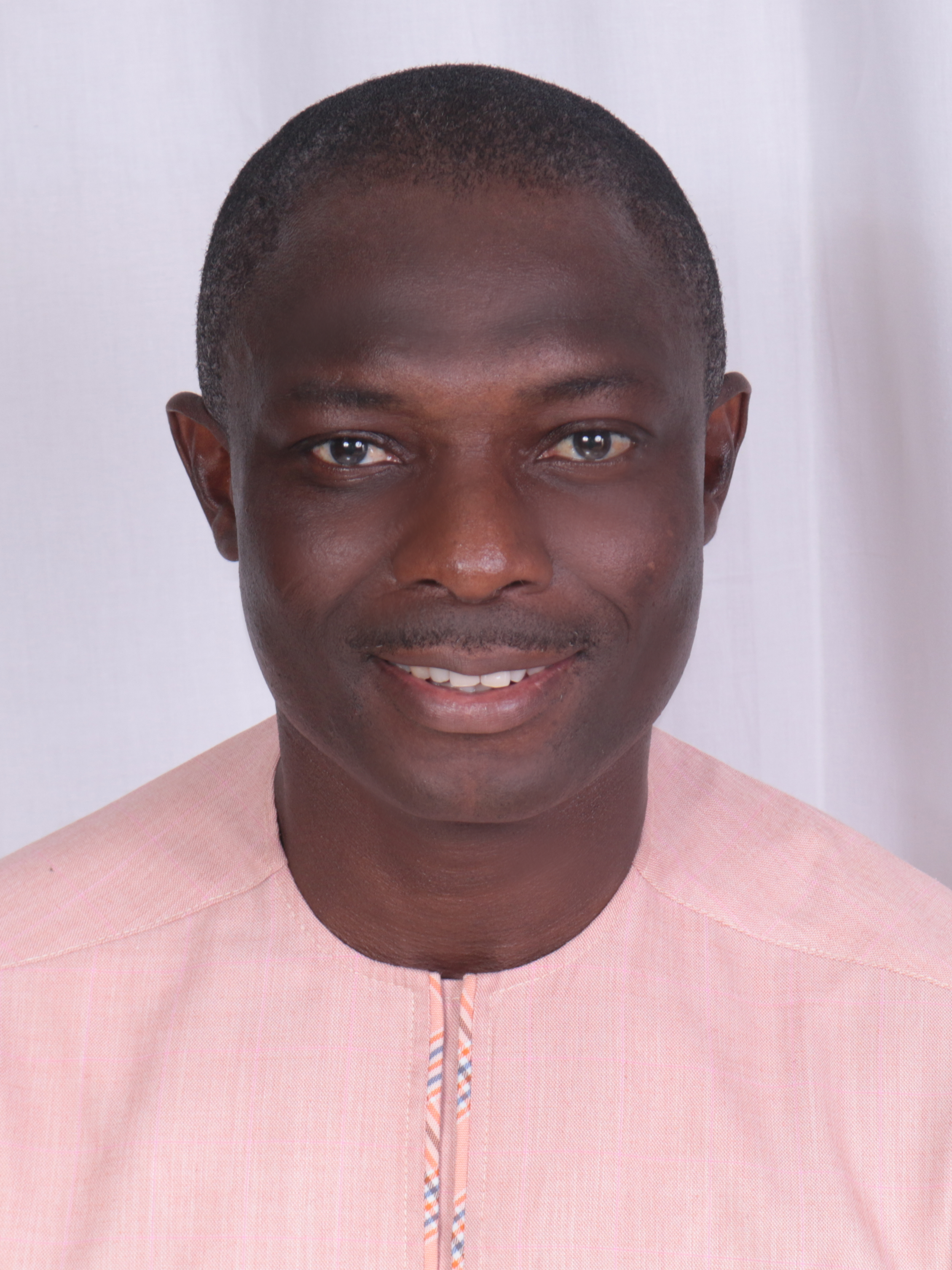

MP for Obuasi West
- Incumbent
- Assumed office 2013
- President: John Mahama

Deputy Minister for Finance
- Incumbent
- Assumed office April 2017
- President: Nana Akuffo-Addo

Personal details
- Born: Kwaku Agyemang Kwarteng; 12 February 1969 (age 57) Kokofu, Ghana
- Party: New Patriotic Party
- Children: 3
- Education: KNUST, University of Ghana
- Occupation: Politician
- Profession: Economist, Engineer
- Committees: Finance Committee (Chairperson); Communications Committee

Kwaku Agyemang Kwarteng (born February 12, 1969) is a Ghanaian civil engineer, economist, and politician. He is a two term Member of Parliament for Obuasi West constituency in the Ashanti Region of Ghana. He is a member of Ghana's New Patriotic Party and a deputy minister of finance.

== Life ==
=== Early life ===
Kwaku Kwarteng was born on February 12, 1969, in Kokofu in the Ashanti Region of Ghana. He attended the Kwame Nkrumah University of Science and Technology in nearby Kumasi, where he obtained a Bachelor of Science degree in civil engineering in 1996. He later obtained a Master of Science degree also in civil engineering from the same university in 2013. He also has an M.A. in Economic Policy Management from the University of Ghana in 2009.

=== Career ===
Much of the working life of Kwaku Kwarteng has been in politics. He served as the Government of Ghana spokesperson on finance from 2006 to 2009. When the John Agyekum Kufour administration left power in 2009, he became a policy advisor for the New Patriotic Party from 2010 to 2013.

In 2011 he was elected as the New Patriotic Party candidate to contest the newly created Obuasi West constituency. In the 2012 General elections, he contested against John Alexander Ackon of the National Democratic Congress, Abubakar Sadick Iddris of the Progressive People's Party, Ayishetu Tahiru of the National Democratic Party, Mohammed Issifu of the People's National Convention, and the independent candidate Isaac Fordjour. Kwarteng obtained 31,101 votes out of the 48,254 valid votes cast, which represented 64.45% of all votes cast. While in parliament, he has served on several committees including Communications Committee and Poverty Reduction Strategy Committee.

In January 2017, President Nana Akufo-Addo nominated Kwarteng and Charles Adu Boahen to become the deputy ministers of finance. They were to work under Ken Ofori-Atta. Kwarteng was vetted by the Appointments Committee of Parliament in March 2017. During his vetting, he claimed that the John Dramani Mahama administration had left outstanding arrears of 7 billion cedis owed various institutions in the country. The minority discredited the claim saying there was no such debt. Kwarteng also restated the government's desire to bring down the interest rate. The committee approved him for the position for which he had been appointed.

In the 2016 Ghana general elections, he won the parliamentary seat with 32,049 votes whilst the NDC parliamentary aspirant John Alexander Ackon had 11,587 votes.

In the 2020 Ghana general elections, he won the parliamentary seat with 33,383 votes whilst the NDC parliamentary aspirant Faustilove Appiah Kannin had 15,141 votes.

He is also the Deputy Minister for Finance.

== Committees ==
He served as a member in the Finance Committee and also in the Poverty Reduction Committee. While in parliament, he has served on several committees including Communications Committee. He is currently the Chairperson of the Finance Committee and also a member of the Communications Committee.

== Personal life ==
Kwarteng is married with three children. He identifies as a Catholic.

Political offices
| Preceded by ? | Deputy Minister of Finance of Ghana; 2017 - | Incumbent |
