= Goodwin Tutum Anim =

Ghanaian journalist (1929–2020)

- Born: Isaac Goodwin Aikens; 29 May 1929; Accra
- Died: 2 October 2020 (aged 91)
- Education: Accra Academy; University of Ghana; University of Iowa
- Occupation: Journalist
- Notable credits: Ghana News Agency; Reuters; Panafrican News Agency

Goodwin Tutum Anim, also known by the name Isaac Goodwin Aikins, was a Ghanaian journalist. He was the first African Managing Director of the Ghana News Agency and later Executive Secretary of the Ministry of Arts and Culture.

== Early life and education ==
Anim was born on 29 May 1929 at Intsin, Cape Coast. He was christened Isaac Aikins by his maternal grandfather in the absence of his father. When he was five years old he was sent to his grandfather in Tudu, Accra, who changed his name to Goodwin Tutum Anim. Later in his lifetime, he changed his name to Isaac Goodwin Aikins.

Anim begun his early formative years at the Adabraka Government Boys School and later continued to Kinbu Government School. He had his secondary education at the Accra Academy from 1944 to 1950, and later proceeded to the University of Ghana where he obtained his Bachelor of Arts degree in English. He later entered the University of Iowa for his post graduate studies and in 1976, he graduated with his doctorate degree (PhD). His dissertation was entitled; Reconceptualizing the Role of the Press: The Case of Ghana"'.

== Career ==
Anim begun his professional career in 1958 at the Ghana News Agency (GNA) as a trainee reporter, reporter sub-editor and foreign correspondent. While with the Ghana News Agency, he had a nine-month attachment studying media organisation, inter-media personnel relations, administration and news management at Reuters News Agency in London and Paris. From October 1960 to December 1960, he was a GNA Special Correspondent at the 15th Session of the United Nations General Assembly, New York. He became the acting Managing Editor of the Ghana News Agency, and in 1961, he was appointed General Manager of the Ghana News Agency, becoming the first African and Ghanaian head of the agency. A year later, he became the Secretary of the Association of Ghanaian Journalists (later Ghana Journalists Association), a position he held for two years, and between 1963 and 1965, he was made Secretary-General and later Vice-President of the Union of African News Agencies. He served as the General Manager of the Ghana News Agency from 1961 until 1966 when the Nkrumah government was overthrown.

Between 1966 and 1967, he had several short stints holding a Special Duties position at the Ministry of Information. In 1967, he was appointed Executive Secretary of the Ministry of Cultural Affairs. A position he held until 1968. He was appointed Managing Director of the Ghana Tourist Corporation from 1968 until 1970 when he was made Registrar of the University of Cape Coast. From 1970 to 1971, he was the Assistant Director of the Information and Culture Department at Ministry of Foreign Affairs, and Secretary of the Ghana Institute of Management and Public Administration from 1971 to 1972. In 1972, he was named Director of the Ghana Information Services Department, where he remained Director for eight years.

In 1978, he was a member of the 1978 Constitutional Commission that was responsible for drafting the constitution for the Third Republic of Ghana.

He became a UNESCO consultant to the Pan African News Agency (PANA) and to news agencies in West, Central and East Africa from 1980 to 1981. From 1981 until his retirement in 1989, he was the Programme Specialist at the Communication and Culture Division, UNESCO Headquarters, Paris. During this period, he spent nine months in Lusaka as UNESCO Coordinator news agency development in Eastern and Southern Africa responsible for training and structural design of news agencies in Tanzania, Malawi, Kenya, Uganda, Zambia, Botswana, Lesotho, Mozambique, Angola, and Mauritius among other countries.

Anim served on various boards as chairman. Some of which include; the Ghana Broadcasting Corporation from 1995 to 1996; the Ghana News Agency in 1992, and the Ghana Tourist Board, Accra from 1991 to 1992. He also served on the board of directors of the Graphic Corporation, Accra from 1968 to 1970.

== Personal life ==
Anim was married to the late Jane Anna Anim (née Golightly), a teacher and businesswoman. Together they had seven children.

Anim was a Christian and a deacon of the Anglican Church. Following his retirement, he served as a Diocesan and Synod Secretary of the Anglican Diocese of Accra, he was the Chief Administrative Officer of the Diocese, and also the Supervisor of Staff Secretary to the Standing Committee and other committees. He founded Shepherd Star School and served as the Proprietor of the nursery and kindergarten school.

== Death ==
Anim died on 2 October 2020 at the age of 91 after a short illness. He was laid to rest in a private ceremony on Friday 16 October 2020. A memorial service was held in his honour by the Ghana News Agency and the Ghana Journalists Association. He was survived by seven children, eleven grandchildren and one great-grandchild.
