= Community Health Nurses Training College, Fomena =

The Community Health Nurses Training College is public tertiary health institution in Fomena in the Ashanti Region of Ghana. The college is in the Adansi North District. The activities of the institution is supervised by the Ministry of Education. The Nurses and Midwifery Council (NMC) regulates the activities, curriculum and examination of the student nurses and midwives. The council's mandate Is enshrined under section 4(1) of N.R.C.D 117.
