= Nicholas Anane-Agyei =

Ghanaian politician

Regional Commissioner for the Brong Ahafo Region
- In office 1965–1966
- President: Dr. Kwame Nkrumah
- Preceded by: Robert Okyere Amoako-Atta
- Succeeded by: Lt.-Col. I. K. Akyeampong

Member of the Ghana Parliament for Dormaa-droboo
- In office 1965–1966
- Preceded by: New
- Succeeded by: Constituency abolished

Personal details
- Born: Nicholas Anane-Agyei Gold Coast
- Party: Convention People's Party

Nicholas Anane-Agyei was a Ghanaian politician in the first republic. He was the Regional Commissioner for the Brong Ahafo Region and the member of parliament for the Dormaa-droboo constituency from 1965 to 1966. Prior to entering parliament, he was the district commissioner for Sunyani.

== See also ==
- List of MPs elected in the 1965 Ghanaian parliamentary election
