= Nurses Training College, Berekum =

Public nursing college in Berekum, Ghana

The Holy Family Nurses' Training College is public tertiary health institution in the Berekum in the Brong Ahafo Region of Ghana. The college is in the Berekum District. The activities of the institution is supervised by the Ministry of Education. The University of Ghana awards a Diploma in Nursing after students from the institution have successfully completed a three-year nursing training programme. The institution is accredited by the National Accreditation Board. The Nurses and Midwifery Council (NMC) is the regulates the activities, curriculum and examination of the student nurses and midwives. The council's mandate Is enshrined under section 4(1) of N.R.C.D 117.
