= Iduapriem Gold Mine =

Gold mine in Western, Ghana

Iduapriem
- Location in Ghana
- Location: Tarkwa, Western Region, Ghana; 05°18′N 001°59′W
- Production: 190,000
- Financial year: 2009
- Company: AngloGold Ashanti
- Website: AngloGold Ashanti website
- Acquired: 2004

The Iduapriem Gold Mine (French: Mine d'or d'Iduapriem) is an open-pit gold mine situated 10 km south of Tarkwa, in the Western Region of Ghana. The mine is owned by AngloGold Ashanti and consists of the Iduapriem and the Teberebie operation, which were merged in 2000. AngloGold Ashanti originally only owned 85% of the mine but acquired the remaining 15% in September 2007.

In 2008, AngloGold Ashanti's Ghana operations, consisting of Iduapriem and the Obuasi Gold Mine, contributed 11% to the company's annual production. Both mines became part of AngloGold Ashanti when AngloGold merged with the Ashanti Goldfields Corporation in 2004.

In 2009, the mine employed 1,447 people. The mine has been fatality-free since 1999.

== Environmental impact ==
The mine and its owners have been criticised in the past for the loss of land for local farmers, the pollution and drying-up of local rivers and watersources and the lack of action to combat these issues.

Mining at Iduapriem was suspended for a time in early 2010 to allow for the construction of a temporary tailings storage facility at the mine. The operators were told by the Environmental Protection Agency of Ghana to suspend operations over "potentially adverse environmental impacts arising from the current tailings storage facility".

== Mine ownership ==
Majority-owned by the Ashanti Goldfields Corporation from 2000 onwards, ownership of this 85% share of the operation was transferred to AngloGold Ashanti with the merger of Ashanti and AngloGold in 2004. The new company owned an 80% share of Iduapriem, with the remaining 20% held by the International Finance Corporation, and a 90% share of Teberebie, with the Government of Ghana holding the remainder. Combined, this accumulated to an 85% share for AngloGold Ashanti in the whole operation. In September 2007, the company acquired the remaining 15% as well.

== Production ==
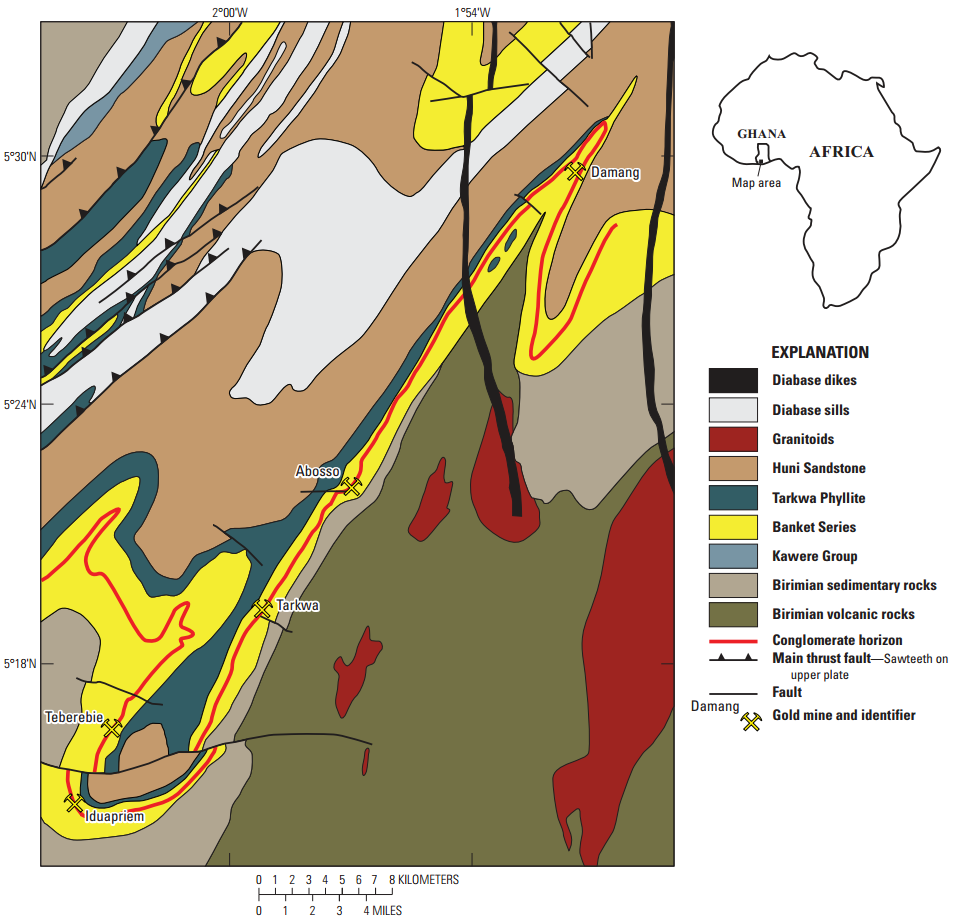
Geological map of the Tarkwa gold district in Ghana showing significant folding and faulting

Production figures of the recent past were:

Year	Production	Grade	Cost per ounce
2002	185,199 ounces	1.66 g/t	US$ 232
2003	243,533 ounces	1.75 g/t	US$240
2004	147,000 ounces	1.72 g/t	US$303
2005	205,000 ounces	1.71 g/t	US$348
2006	196,000 ounces	1.74 g/t	US$368
2007	185,000 ounces	1.85 g/t	US$373
2008	200,000 ounces	1.76 g/t	US$525
2009	190,000 ounces	1.72 g/t	US$516
2010			

- The 2004 results are for the eight month from May to December only.

== See also ==
- Geology of Ghana
