= Nurses Training College, Sunyani =

The Sunyani Nursing and Midwifery Training College (formerly known as Sunyani Nursing/Nurses' Training College) is public tertiary health institution in the Sunyani in the Bono Region of Ghana. The is in the Sunyani Municipal District. The activities of the institution is supervised by the Ministry of Health. The University of Ghana awards a Diploma in Nursing after students from the institution have successfully completed a three-year nursing training programme. The institution is accredited by the National Accreditation Board. The Nurses and Midwifery Council (NMC) is the body which regulates the activities, curriculum and examination of the institution. The council's mandate Is enshrined under section 4(1) of N.R.C.D 117.
