= Nurses Training College, Nkawkaw =

The Nkawkaw Nurses Training College is public tertiary health institution in Nkawkaw in the Eastern Region of Ghana. The college is in the Nkawkaw District. The institution is accredited by the National Accreditation Board. The Nurses and Midwifery Council (NMC) is the regulates the activities, curriculum and examination of the student nurses and midwives. The council's mandate Is enshrined under section 4(1) of N.R.C.D 117.

== Academy Programs ==
The Kwame Nkrumah University of Science and Technology awards a Diploma in Nursing after students from the institution have successfully completed a three-year nursing training programme.
