= Adansi South District =

- District
- Districts of Ashanti Region

- Location of Adansi South District within Ashanti
- Coordinates: 6°4′N 1°24′W
- Country: Ghana
- Region: Ashanti
- Capital: New Edubiase

Government
  - District Executive: Francis Kwabena Ankomah

Area
  - Total: 1,380 km^{2} (530 sq mi)

Population (2021 Census)
  - Total: 85,200
  - Density: 61.7/km^{2} (160/sq mi)
- Time zone: UTC+0 (GMT)

Adansi South District is one of the forty-three districts in Ashanti Region, Ghana. Originally it was created from parts of two former districts on 17 February 2004: Adansi West District and Adansi East District; thus the remaining parts had been absorbed into parts of Obuasi Municipal District and Adansi North District respectively. On 15 March 2018, the western part of the district was split off to create Akrofuom District. The district assembly is the southernmost part of Ashanti Region and has New Edubiase as its capital town.

== Geography ==
Adansi South District lies entirely in a forest.

== Economy ==
The district contains eight forest reserves. Hardwood lumber is a major district asset. It is on record to be one of the largest cocoa producing areas in Ghana. Among the crops grown in Adansi South are plantains, cocoyams, rice. The forest also produces sinal and mushroom

== Tourism ==
The region is popular for eco-tourism, containing many scenic waterfalls and mountain ranges.
