= Nurses Training College, Agogo =

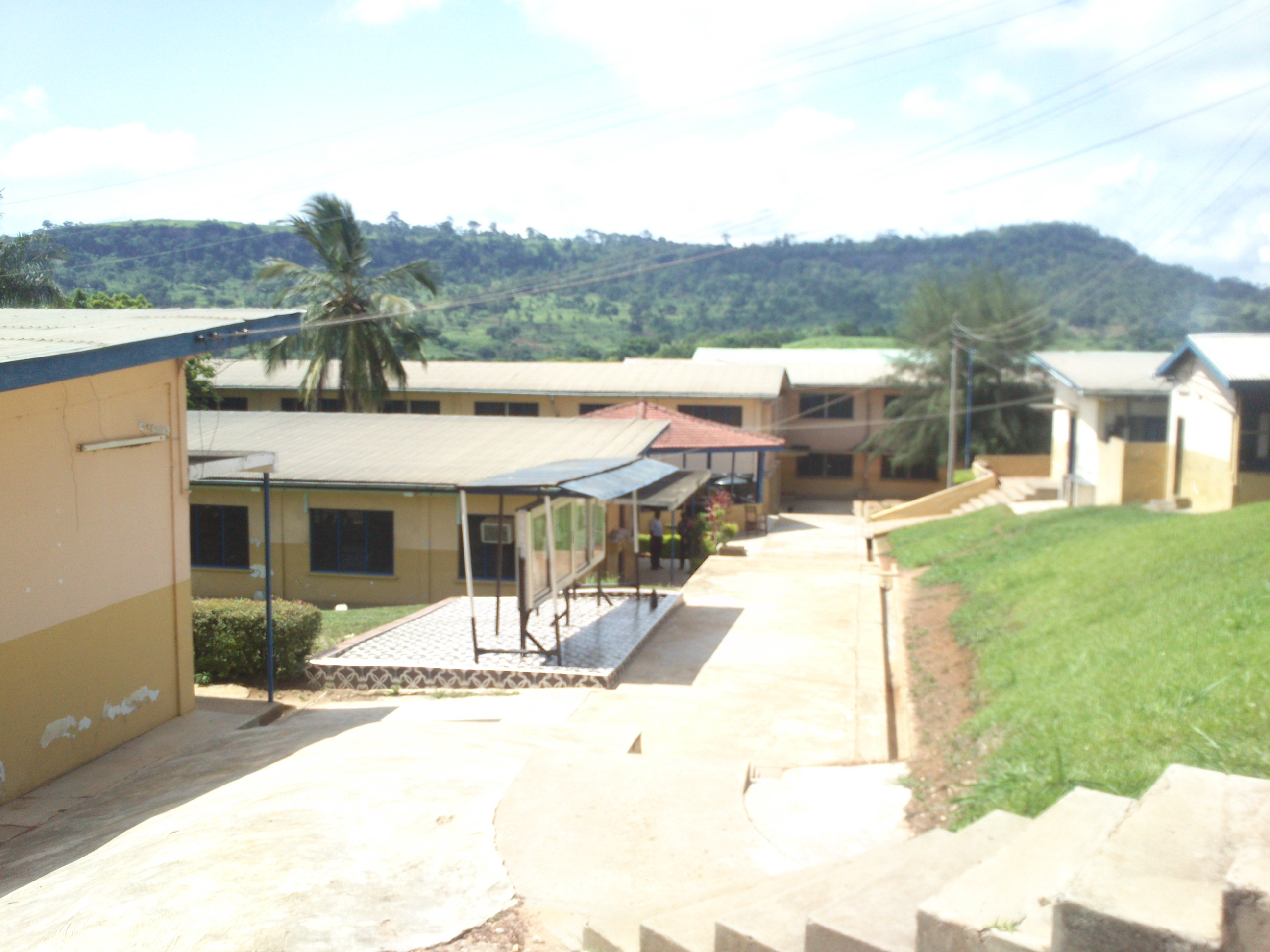
Presbyterian Nursing and Midwifery Training College, Agogo

The Presbyterian Nursing and Midwifery Training College, Agogo, formerly Presbyterian Nurses' Training College is a public tertiary health institution located in Agogo Ashanti Akim in the Ashanti Region of Ghana. It was established by the Swiss missionaries in March 1935 in order to train nurses for the Agogo Presbyterian Hospital. The Hospital and the Nursing/Midwifery training college are all under the Presbyterian Health services. The Presbyterian Health services is also under the Christian Health Association of Ghana (CHAG). CHAG is an association of Christian Churches that have established hospitals and or medical training institutions. Since its establishment in 1935, the college has undergone several reformations until now that it is currently training students in Diploma in Midwifery, Diploma in General Nursing Program and Post Basic Midwifery .

The institution is accredited by the National Accreditation Board. The Nurses and Midwifery Council (NMC) is the authority that regulates the activities, curriculum and examination of the College. The Council's mandate Is enshrined under section 4(1) of N.R.C.D 117 of the constitution of Ghana. The institution is also supervised by the Ministry of Education and Ministry of Health of Ghana.

The institution is affiliated to the Kwame Nkrumah University of Science and Technology and successful students are awarded Diploma in General Nursing or Midwifery after three years of study by the University.

== Organization and governance ==
The College is one of the seven constituent institutions of Ashanti-Akyem Presbyterian Health Services, headed by the General Manager. The College is headed by the Principal assisted by the Vice Principal. The Principal reports to the General Manager. Under the Area Board is the Internal Management Committee with the Head of the institution as a member and has the General Manager as the Chairperson. The Area Board meets quarterly. The Internal Management Committee meets twice a month.

== Foreign aid ==
The Males Hostel of the college was built with funds from E.Z.E Germany. It was renovated with funds from the Old Parish Church, Hamilton, Scotland. It was dedicated on the 8 May 1994 by Rt. Rev. Dr. James Weatherhead, Moderator of the General Assembly of the Church of Scotland.

== Administration ==
- General Manager: Mr. Alex Nyamekesse
- Principal: Mrs. Florence Gans-Lartey
- Vice Principal: Mr. Charles Agyemang Prempeh

== Programs of study ==
- Diploma in Registered General Nursing
- Diploma in Registered Midwifery
- Post Basic Midwifery

The Diploma in General Nursing is for both males and females. The Midwifery program is strictly a female program.
