= Nurses Training College, Tibie =

The Tibie Nurses Training College is public tertiary health institution in the Tibie in the Brong Ahafo Region of Ghana. The college is in Tibie-Asonafu. The Nurses and Midwifery Council (NMC) regulates the activities, curriculum and examinations. The council's mandate Is enshrined under section 4(1) of N.R.C.D 117.
