= Community Health Nurses Training College, Esiama =

The Esiama Community Health Nurses Training College is public tertiary health institution in the Esiama in the Western Region of Ghana. The activities of the institution is supervised by the Ministry of Education. The Nurses and Midwifery Council regulates the activities, curriculum and examination of the. The Council's mandate Is enshrined under section 4(1) of N.R.C.D 117.
