= Aggrey Memorial Secondary School =

Location
- Arochukwu; Nigeria; 5.378257°N 7.911929°E

Information
- Type: School
- Established: 1931
- Founder: Alvan Azinna Ikoku

Aggrey Memorial Secondary School is a school in Arochukwu, Nigeria.

== History ==
Founded in 1931, Aggrey Memorial Secondary School is a co-educational secondary school. The school was founded by the Nigerian educator, statesman, activist and politician Alvan Azinna Ikoku.

Unlike many founders who would name institutions after themselves, Dr Ikoku named the institution after James Emman Kwegyir Aggrey (October 18, 1875 – July 30, 1927) who was a missionary and teacher from Ghana.
