= K. T. Hammond =

Ghanaian politician (born 1960)

Hon. Kobina Tahir Hammond
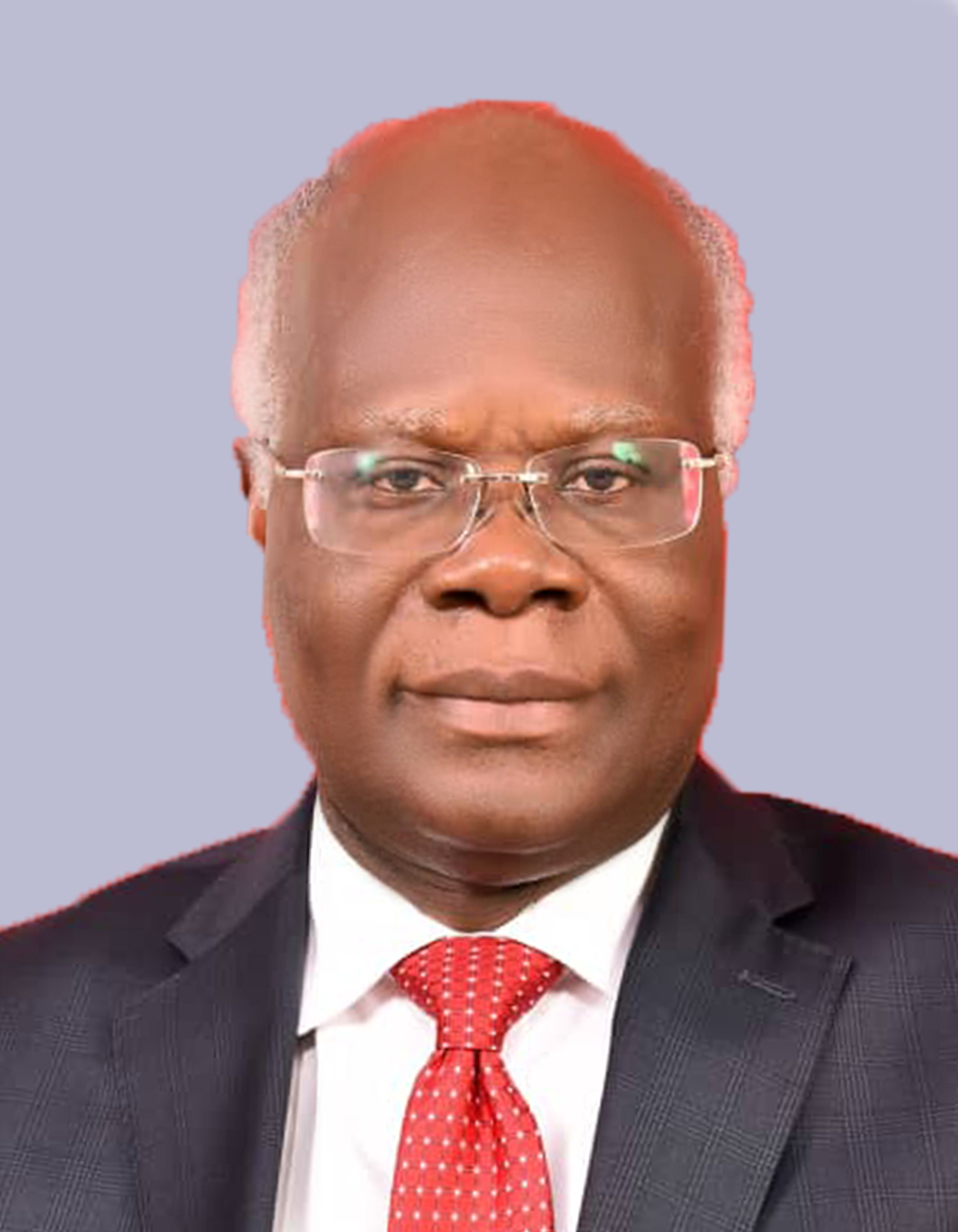

Member of the Ghana Parliament for Adansi-Asokwa
- In office 7 January 2001 – 6 January 2025
- Preceded by: John Kofi Gyasi
- Succeeded by: Godwin Animli Dzogbazi-Dorani

Personal details
- Born: 16 June 1960 (age 66)
- Party: New Patriotic Party
- Spouse: Nabeela Naeema Wahab Sahiba
- Education: University of Ghana;
- Profession: Lawyer
- Committees: Finance Committee & Mines and Energy Committee(7th Parliament of 4th Republic of Ghana)

Kobina Tahir Hammond (born 16 June 1960), known as K.T. Hammond, is a Ghanaian politician and a member of the New Patriotic Party. He was the Member of Parliament for the Adansi-Asokwa constituency in the Ashanti Region and a former Minister of Trade and Industries. Hammond, who first entered Parliament in the year 2001 of which he ended term in service in parliament as a sixth term MP in 2025.

== Early life and education ==
Hammond was born on 16 June 1960. He hails from Asokwa, a town in the Ashanti Region of Ghana. Hammond had his high school education at Adisadel College. He holds a Bachelor of Arts degree in Law and Political Science from the University of Ghana. He acquired the degree in 1986. He is also a product of Holborn Law School, London, UK. From there, he acquired a Bachelor of Law in 1991.

== Political career ==
Hammond became a member of parliament from January 2001 after emerging winner in the General Election on 7 December 2000. He has since then had a run of five consecutive terms in office. He was the MP for Adansi-Asokwa constituency. He was elected as the member of parliament for this constituency in the third, fourth, fifth, sixth and seventh parliaments of the fourth Republic of Ghana. He was re-elected in the 2020 General election to represent in the 8th Parliament of the Fourth Republic. Hammond was a member of the Finance Committee, Mines and Energy Committee as well as the Local Government and Rural Development Committee of the eighth Parliament of the 4th Republic.

== Elections ==
In the year 2000, Hammond won the general elections as the member of parliament for the Adansi-Asokwa constituency of the Ashanti Region of Ghana. He won on the ticket of the New Patriotic Party. His constituency was a part of the 31 parliamentary seats out of 33 seats won by the New Patriotic Party in that election for the Ashanti Region. The New Patriotic Party won a majority total of 99 parliamentary seats out of 200 seats. He was elected with 10,306 votes out of 19,407 total valid votes cast. This was equivalent to 54.4% of the total valid votes cast. He was elected over Theresa Mensah of the National Democratic Congress, Nana Yaw Frimpong of the People's National Convention, Kwame Amoh of the Convention People's Party, Peter Kofi Essilfie of the National Reformed Party and Prince Lawrence of the United Ghana Movement. These won 7,230, 1,001, 241, 92 and 61 votes out of the total valid votes cast respectively. These were equivalent to 38.2%, 5.3%, 1.3%, 0.5% and 0.3% respectively of total valid votes cast.

Hammond was elected as the member of parliament for the Adansi-Asokwa constituency of the Ashanti Region of Ghana for the second time in the 2004 elections. He won on the ticket of the New Patriotic Party. His constituency was a part of the 36 parliamentary seats out of 39 seats won by the New Patriotic Party in that election for the Ashanti Region. The New Patriotic Party won a majority total of 128 parliamentary seats out of 230 seats. He was elected with 15,176 votes out of 24,112 total valid votes cast equivalent to 62.9% of total valid votes cast. He was elected over Seidu S. Adams of the Peoples’ National Convention and Reverend Evans Amankwa of the National Democratic Congress. These obtained 0.7% and 36.3% respectively of total valid votes cast.

In 2008, he won the general elections on the ticket of the New Patriotic Party for the same constituency. His constituency was part of the 34 parliamentary seats out of 39 seats won by the New Patriotic Party in that election for the Ashanti Region. The New Patriotic Party won a minority total of 109 parliamentary seats out of 230 seats. He was elected with 13,659 votes out of 24,524 total valid votes cast equivalent to 55.7% of total valid votes cast. He was elected over Alhaji Abdul-Lateef Madjoub of the National Democratic Congress, Amoako Anaafi of Democratic Freedom Party and Owusu-Boamah Francis of the Convention People's Party. These obtained 37.59%, 5.43% and 1.28% respectively of the total votes cast.

Hammond got re-elected in the 2012, 2016 and 2020 elections. In January 2024, his party confirmed him as its parliamentary candidate for the general election in December 2024.

In the 2024 Ghanaian general election, he lost out on the parliamentary elections to the National Democratic Congress (Ghana) candidate Godwin Animli Dzogbazi-Dorani.

== Ministerial positions ==
In February 2023, following the resignation of Alan Kyerematen as Minister for Trade and Industries, Nana AKufo-Addo nominated Hammond for consideration by Parliament as Minister for Trade and Industries. In March 2023, Parliament approved his nomination and he was subsequently sworn into office.

K. T. Hammond also served as Deputy Energy Minister in the John Kufuor's Administration from the year 2001 to 2007. Before Parliament's appointments committee in 2023, Hammond cited Ghana's discovery of oil in commercial quantities in 2007 as his biggest achievement.

"....it was through the administration of J A Kufuor under the ministry of energy and myself. My minister at the time was Kan Dapaah. He gave me the portfolio of petroleum. GNPC was literally not in existence, it had collapsed. He gave the responsibility to make sure GNPC was on its two feet to make they entered proper exploration and so to develop and make sure we find oil in this country.

I was mandated to travel all over the world to look for entrepreneurs, companies and to see if they could make sense of our potential. Mr. speaker, it was i, KT Hammond, in May 2004 who signed MOU which eventually led to KOSMOS discovering that oil in Ghana. That was the big achievement," Hammond told parliament when he appeared to be vetted for consideration as minister for Trade and industry.

== Personal life ==
Hammond is an Ahmadiya Muslim. He is married to Nabeela Naeema Wahab Sahiba, a high Court Judge.

== See also ==
- List of MPs elected in the 2000 Ghanaian parliamentary election
