= Nurses Training College, Bawku =

The Bawku Nurses Training College is public tertiary health institution in the Bawku in the Upper East Region of Ghana. The college is in the Bawku District. The Nurses and Midwifery Council (NMC) is the regulates the activities, curriculum and examination of the student nurses and midwives. The council's mandate Is enshrined under section 4(1) of N.R.C.D 117. Established in the 1960s by the Presbyterian missionaries, it is located at Natinga.
