= Adansi Asokwa District =

District in Ashanti Region, Ghana

- District
- Districts of Ashanti Region

- Location of Adansi Asokwa District within Ashanti
- Coordinates: 6°17′N 1°31′W
- Country: Ghana
- Region: Ashanti
- Capital: Adansi Asokwa

Government
  - District Chief Executive: Andrew Adu Boahen

Area
  - Total: 622.8 km^{2} (240.5 sq mi)

Population (2021)
  - Total: 71,844
  - Density: 115.4/km^{2} (298.8/sq mi)
- Time zone: UTC+0 (GMT)
  - Summer (DST): GMT

Adansi Asokwa District is one of the forty-three districts in Ashanti Region, Ghana. Originally it was formerly part of the then-larger Adansi North District on 17 February 2004, until the southeast part of the district was split off to create Adansi Asokwa District on 15 March 2018; thus the remaining part has been retained as Adansi North District. The district assembly is located in the southern part of Ashanti Region and has Adansi Asokwa as its capital town.

== Sources ==
- "Adansi North District". Statoids.
