= Edward Michael Ennin =

Ghanaian politician

Hon. Edward Michael Ennin

Member of Parliament for Obuasi East
- In office 7 January 2013 – 6 January 2017
- Preceded by: Constituency split
- Succeeded by: Patrick Boakye-Yiadom

Member of Parliament for Obuasi
- In office 7 January 2005 – 6 January 2013
- Preceded by: Anthony Bright Boadi-Mensah
- Succeeded by: Constituency split

Personal details
- Born: 16 May 1970 (age 56) Old Edubiase, Ashanti region, Ghana
- Party: New Patriotic Party
- Children: 3
- Education: Ghana Institute of Management and Public Administration, Kwame Nkrumah University of Science and Technology
- Profession: Insurance Broker/ Programmer

Edward Michael Ennin (born 16 May 1970) is the Member of the 5th Parliament of the 4th Republic of Ghana for Obuasi East in the Ashanti region of Ghana. He was elected on the ticket of the New Patriotic Party (NPP) won a majority of votes to become the Member of Parliament.

== Early life and education ==
Ennin was born on 16 May 1970 in Old Edubiase in the Ashanti region. He obtained his Diploma in Data Processing from the Kwame Nkrumah University of Science and Technology. He obtained the diploma in 1997 from the university. He also obtained an EMGL degree from Ghana Institute of Management and Public Administration. He obtained the degree in 2008.

== Career ==
Ennin is an Insurance broker and programmer. He is a banker and an economist as well. He was the Ashanti Regional Representative of All Risk Consultancy Limited.

== Politics ==
Ennin is a member of the New Patriotic Party. He served as a member of the Fifth, Sixth and Seventh Parliament of the Fourth Republic of Ghana. He was sworn in after defeating his opposition by obtaining 59.08% of the total valid votes cast. He is part of the committee on Government Assurances, Mines and Energy. He has been a Member of Parliament from January 2005 to date.

== Elections ==
Ennin was elected as the member of parliament for the Obuasi East constituency of the Ashanti Region of Ghana for the first time in the 2004 Ghanaian general elections. He won on the ticket of the New Patriotic Party. His constituency was a part of the 36 parliamentary seats out of 39 seats won by the New Patriotic Party in that election for the Ashanti Region. The New Patriotic Party won a majority total of 128 parliamentary seats out of 230 seats. He was elected with 43,102 votes out of 74,717 total valid votes cast. This was equivalent to 57.7% of total valid votes cast. He was elected over Michael Carr Aaron of the People's National Convention, Justice Dasah of the National Democratic Congress and Adelaide Borden an independent candidate. These obtained 550, 4,426 and 26,639 votes respectively of the total valid votes cast. These were equivalent to 0.7%, 5.9% and 35.7% respectively of total valid votes cast.

In 2008, he won the general elections on the ticket of the New Patriotic Party for the same constituency. His constituency was part of the 34 parliamentary seats out of 39 seats won by the New Patriotic Party in that election for the Ashanti Region. The New Patriotic Party won a minority total of 109 parliamentary seats out of 230 seats. He was elected with 46,785 votes out of 75,085 total valid votes cast. This was equivalent to 62.31% of total valid votes cast. He was elected over Mohammed Issifu of the People's National Convention, John Alexander Ackon of the National Democratic Congress, Elyass Abdulsalam of the Democratic Freedom Party, David Kenyah of the Convention People's Party and Albert Joseph Ababio of the Reformed Patriotic Democrats. These obtained 331, 26,169, 147, 1,501 and 152 votes respectively out of the total valid votes cast. These were equivalent to 0.44%, 34.85%, 0.20%, 2% and 0.2% respectively of the total votes cast.

In 2012, he won the general elections once again for the same constituency. He was elected with 24,212 votes out of 40,985 total valid votes cast. This was equivalent to 59.08% of total valid votes cast. He was elected over Abdul-Lateef Majdoub of the National Democratic Congress, Frank Aboagye Danyansah of the Progressive People's Party, Hanim Ishaq of People's National Convention and Edward Ahey of the National Democratic Party. These obtained 15,381, 899, 206 and 287 votes respectively of the total valid votes cast. These were equivalent to 37.53%, 2.19%, 0.50% and 0.70% respectively of the total votes cast.

== Personal life ==
Ennin is married with three children. He is a Christian (Methodist).
