= Navrongo, Nurses Training College =

The Navrongo Nurses Training College is public tertiary health institution in the Navrongo in the Upper East Region of Ghana. The college is in the Navrongo District. The activities of the institution is supervised by the Ministry of Education. The Nurses and Midwifery Council (NMC) is the regulates the activities, curriculum and examination of the. The Council's mandate Is enshrined under section 4(1) of N.R.C.D. 117.
