= John Kofi Gyasi =

Ghanaian politician

Honorable John Kofi Gyasi

MP for Adansi-Asokwa
- In office 7 January 1993 – 6 January 2001
- President: John Jerry Rawlings
- Preceded by: Constituency split
- Succeeded by: Kobina Tahir Hammond

Personal details
- Born: Brofoyedru, Ashanti Region, Ghana
- Party: National Democratic Congress
- Occupation: Politician
- Profession: Teacher

John Kofi Gyasi is a Ghanaian Politician and was a member of the first and second Parliament of the Fourth Republic representing the Adansi-Asokwa Constituency in the Ashanti Region of Ghana.

== Early life and education ==
Kofi Gyasi was born on 22 April 1946 in Brofoyedru in the Ashanti Region of Ghana. He attended Dunkwa Secondary School and Akrokerri Teacher Training College where he obtain his POST-SEC Cert A.

== Politics ==
He was first elected into the 1st parliament of the 4th republic of Ghana on 7 January 1993 after emerging winner at the 1992 Ghanaian Parliamentary Elections.

He was then elected to parliament on the ticket of the National Democratic Congress during the 1996 Ghanaian General Election as a member of parliament representing the Adansi Asokwa constituency in the Ashanti Region. In 1996, he obtained 10,999 votes out of the 19,978 valid votes cast representing 55.06%.

== Career ==
He is a teacher by profession and an insurance rep and formerly a member of parliament for the Adansi-Asokwa constituency in Ashanti Region.

== Personal life ==
Gyasi is a Christian.
