= Ashanti Goldfields Corporation =

Gold mining company

The Ashanti Goldfields Corporation was a gold mining company based in Ghana that was founded by Joseph Ellis and Joseph Biney both from Cape Coast. The Ashanti Mine, located at Obuasi, 56 km south of Kumasi, has been producing since 1897. During the turn of the century 1900, the Ashanti Goldfields Corporation was among the most important gold mining companies listed at the London Stock Exchange. The mine is sited on one of the world's major gold deposits and is one of the ten largest in the world.

In 1994, the Ghana government, the majority shareholder, announced plans to sell 20-25 percent of its interest in AGC in a share flotation. The company was listed on the London and Ghana stock exchanges. It was the largest flotation ever organised by any gold mining company coordinating and advisory team alone numbered over 200 people. Each of the company's 10,000 employees received five free shares.

In 1996 AGC was listed on the New York Stock Exchange to raise new capital, it was the first African company to appear on Wall Street. In 1999, the company nearly succumbed to an ill-executed gold price hedge led by Goldman Sachs, which drove it to the brink of bankruptcy.

In 2004, it merged with AngloGold to create the world's second-largest gold producer, AngloGold Ashanti company. AngloGold is based in South Africa and majority-owned by Anglo American group.

== Mines and production ==
Gold production figures for the company's mines in 2002 and 2003 were (in ounces per annum):

Mine	Country	2002	2003
Bibiani gold mine	Ghana	242,432	212,716
Freda-Rebecca Gold Mine	Zimbabwe	98,255	51,091
Geita Gold Mine (50%)	Tanzania	289,522	330,523
Iduapriem Gold Mine	Ghana	185,199	243,533
Obuasi Gold Mine	Ghana	537,219	513,163
Siguiri Gold Mine	Guinea	269,292	252,795
Overall	Africa	1,621,919	1,603,821

- Percentage figures behind names indicate the share of production of the mine belonging to Ashanti. Production figures shown are those belonging to Ashanti, not overall production.
