= Ghana News Agency =

Ghanaian state-owned news agency

- Company type: State-owned corporation
- Industry: News
- Founded: 1957; 68 years ago
- Founder: Kwame Nkrumah
- Headquarters: Accra, Ghana
- Website: www.gna.org.gh

The Ghana News Agency (GNA) is a Ghanaian state-owned news agency that was founded in 1957 by Kwame Nkrumah. Donald Wright, who was seconded by the Reuters News Agency set up the Ghana News Agency and in 1961 President Nkrumah appointed Dr. Goodwin T. Anim as the GNA's first General Manager. Some viewed the organizatioin as part of a "network of coercive and partisan institutions," in a concerted effort to present a more favorable view of the country to the outside world and to control the flow of information nationally. The New York Times reported in 1964 that most of the agency's news came from Reuters (it had "only a few correspondents abroad"); the agency functioned as a gatekeeper in that it disseminated international news to the Ghanaian press, and deleted any international news critical of the Ghanaian leadership immediately, thus preventing such news from reaching the country's newspapers and radio stations. Until the rise of the Pan African News Agency, the GNA was considered one of the most efficient news agencies in Africa, spreading what Nkrumah called the "clear ideology of the African Revolution" and contributing to "African and Ghanaian emancipation."

Initially operating as a government department, the agency became a state corporation on the day Ghana was declared a republic, in 1960. While in general the Ghanaian media are hailed as relatively free, in 2001 still the GNA was claimed to be firmly pro-government.
