= Obuasi Gold Mine =

Gold mine in Ashanti, Ghana

- Location in Ghana
- Location: Obuasi, Obuasi Municipal District, Ghana; 06°08′53″N 01°41′30″W
- Products: Gold
- Production: 127,000 ounces
- Financial year: 2020
- Type: Underground
- Opened: 1897
- Active: 1897-2014; 2019-
- Company: AngloGold Ashanti
- Website: AngloGold Ashanti website

The Obuasi Gold Mine is an underground gold mine situated near Obuasi, in the Ashanti Region of Ghana. It was at one time one of the world's ten largest gold mines. The mine is in Obuasi Municipal District, 60 kilometres (37 mi) southwest of the regional capital Kumasi.

The mine began operations in 1897. It was renamed AngloGold Ashanti Ghana Limited in 2004.

In 2008, AngloGold Ashanti's Ashantiland operations, consisting of Obuasi and the Iduapriem Gold Mine, contributed 11% to the company's annual production. At its temporary closure in 2014 Obuasi had past gold production plus current resource of 62 million troy ounces.

== History ==
There is a long history of mining in the area, with mining from the Ashanti region providing the gold for which the Gold Coast got its name. Large scale commercial and industrial mining began at Obuasi in 1897 with the formation of Ashanti Goldfields Corporation.

In 2004, Ashanti Goldfields merged with AngloGold to form AngloGold Ashanti. Following significant losses, mining activities were halted in late 2014, with over 5,000 employees laid off and the mine placed in care and maintenance. During this time a large security force remained on site due to heavy pressure from local illegal miners. In 2016 an Obuasi employee was killed by a mob of illegal miners.

In 2018, after approvals were received from the Ghanaian Government, the decision was taken to recapitalize the Obuasi gold mine, with work beginning in 2019. The newly mechanized mine commenced commercial production on October 1, 2020, with its first gold pour in December 2019. It is expected to be fully operational in 2022.

On 18 January 2025, between seven to nine people were shot dead by soldiers in disputed circumstances at the mine. The army said that it had killed seven illegal miners following clashes, while a small-scale miners' association said that the nine victims were unarmed.

== Production ==
Production figures of the recent past were:

Year	Production (troy ounces)	Grade (g/t)	Cash Cost (US$ per ounce)
2002	537,219	4.84	198
2003	513,163	4.28	217
2004	255,000	5.27	305
2005	391,000	4.77	345
2006	387,000	4.39	395
2007	360,000	4.43	459
2008	357,000	4.37	633
2009	381,000	5.18	630
2010	317,000	5.16	744
2011	313,000	4.82	862
2012	280,000	4.79	1,187
2013	239,000	4.94	1,406
2014	243,000	4.67	1,086
2019	2,000		
2020	127,000	6.47	1,145

- The 2004 results are for the eight months from May to December only
- The 2019 results are from the December startup only

== See also ==
- Geology of Ghana
- Birimian
- Gyimi River
