= Fomena =

Fomena Adansi Fomena
- District Capital
- Location in Ghana
- Coordinates: 6°16′N 1°30′W
- Country: Ghana
- Region: Ashanti Region
- District: Adansi North District
- Elevation: 863 ft (263 m)
- Time zone: UTC

Fomena is a small town and the capital of the Adansi North District. The town is the seat of the paramount chief of the Adansi traditional council. The town is known as the place where the Fomena treaty was signed.

== History ==
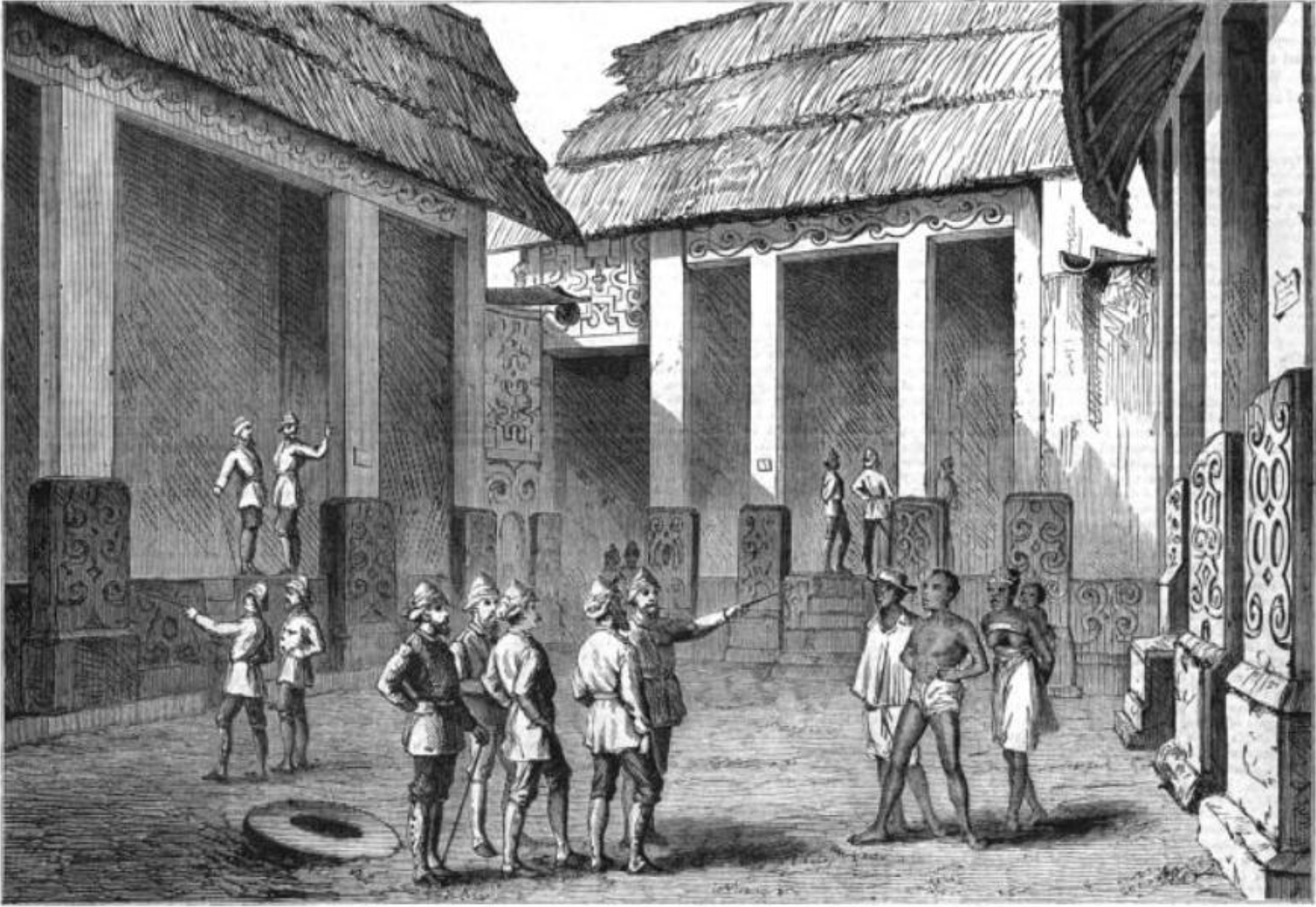
English officers selecting quarters in the chief's palace at Fomena

In 1820, Joseph Dupuis recorded Fomena as a village of humble size. Throughout the 19th century, it underwent major growth under the Ashanti Empire. By 1875, Fomena served as the capital of one of the constituent territories of the Ashanti metropolitan area.

== Education ==
The town has only one high school, T.I. Ahmadiyya Senior High School. The school is a second cycle institution. The town also has a nursing training institution, the Community Health Nurses Training College.

== Economy ==
Much of the residents in the town engage in agriculture. Some of the crops cultivated include maize, rice and cocoa beans.

== Health ==
The town and the district as a whole have been dealing with a lack of proper health facilities even since being settled. To combat this, the government of Ghana began work on a new hospital with the help of 175 million dollars in 2014. After years of inactivity, the Adansi North District Hospital was finally completed in 2023.

== Treaty of Fomena ==
The Treaty of Komena was an agreement between the Ashanti Empire and the British sometime in February of 1874. The treaty was signed in the town of Fomena. The treaty's goal was to bring peace between the two powers after weeks of fighting. It resulted in the Ashanti Empire paying 50,000 ounces of gold and giving up much of its power, playing a role in the state's collapse.

== See also ==
- Fomena (Ghana parliament constituency)
- Adansi Asokwa
- Anglo-Ashanti wars
