= Obuasi =

Mining Town in Ashanti Region, Ghana

- Mining Town & Municipality Capital
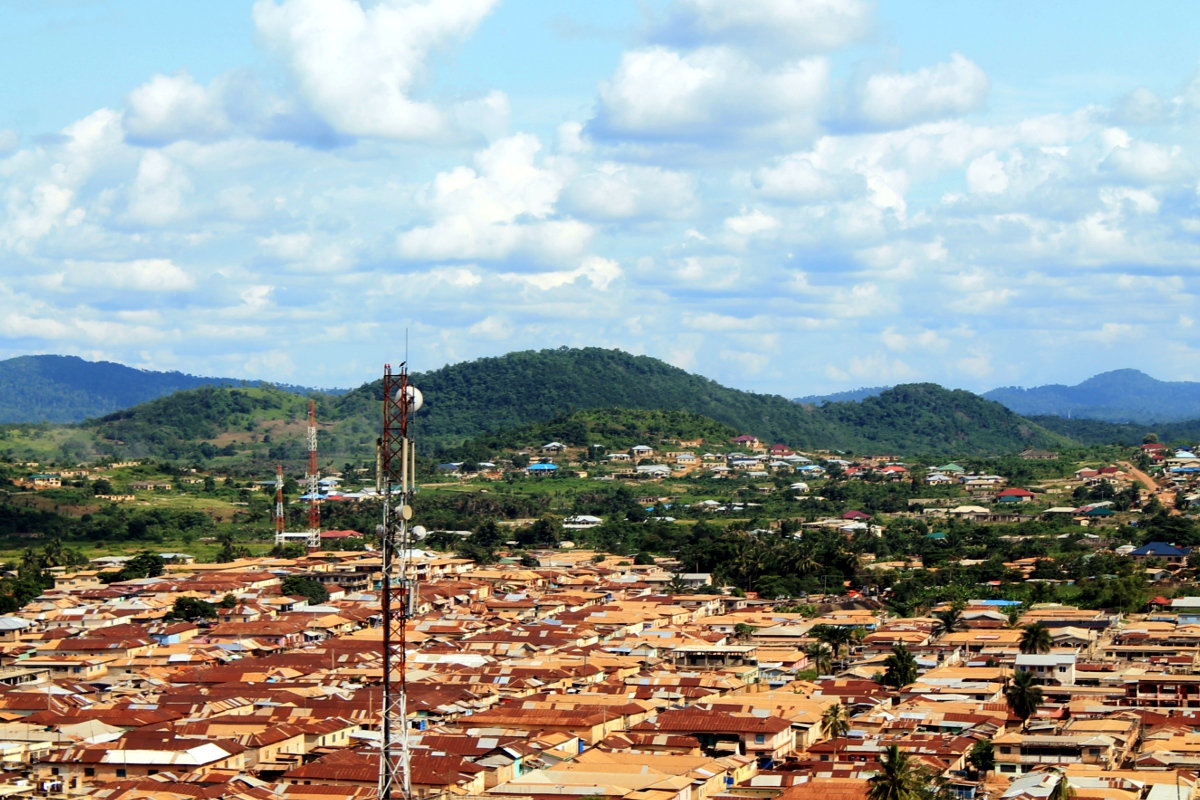
- View of the Obuasi Gold Mine from Obuasi

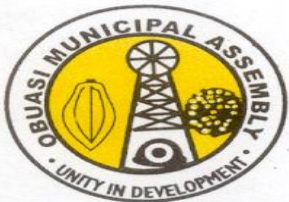
- Seal
- Nicknames: Sikakrom, Gold Town
- Motto: Unity in Development
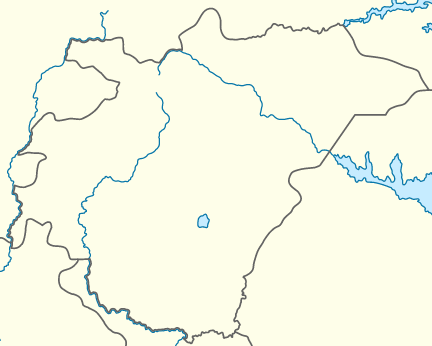
- Location of Obuasi within Ashanti Region Obuasi (Ashanti)
- Coordinates: 06°12′00″N 01°41′00″W
- Country: Ghana
- Region: Ashanti
- Municipality: Obuasi Municipal

Government
  - Type: Absolute monarchy
  - Body: Manhyia Palace; Obuasi Municipal
  - Emperor Asantehene: Osei Tutu II
- Elevation: 101 m (331 ft)

Population (2012)
  - Total: 175,043
  - Ethnicity: Ashanti
- Demonym: Obuasian
- Time zone: GMT
  - Summer (DST): GMT
- postal code: AO
- Area code: 032 25
- climate: Aw
- Website: oma.gov.gh

Obuasi is a gold mining town and is the capital of the Obuasi Municipal District in the Ashanti Region of Ghana. It lies in the southern part of the district and is located about 63 km (39 mi) from Kumasi. As of 2012, the town has a population of 175,043 people. The current mayor (executive chief) of the town is Hon. Elijah Adansi-Bonah.

Obuasi is home to the Obuasi Gold Mine, one of the largest known gold deposits on Earth. The Gold Coast region was named after the large amount of gold mined, historically at Obuasi and the neighbouring Ashanti Region.

== History ==
The area which makes up Obuasi have historically been mined for multiple centuries. The town became an important economic center after the discovery of a large gold deposit in 1897 and the building of a railway from Sekondi in 1902.

== Administration ==
Obuasi has a mayor–council form of government. The mayor, or executive chief, is appointed/approved by the town council, the Obuasi Municipal Assembly and the president of Ghana. The current mayor of the town is Hon. Elijah Adansi-Bonah.

== Demographics ==
About 81.7% of the population is Christian, of which 33.2% are Pentecostal/Charismatic, 19.7% are Protestant, 14% is Catholic while 14.8% are other Christians. This is followed by Islam (13.3%), traditional religions (0.2%), other religions (0.7%), and people who don't reside with any religion (4.1%).

== Economy ==
Obuasi is known for the Obuasi Gold Mine, one of the largest underground gold mines in the world. It is operated by AngloGold Ashanti. Gold has been mined on the site since the late 19th century. Most of the production at the mine stopped in 2014 after being placed under care and maintenance. In 2018, a redevelopment project began to help increase production at the site. It is currently in its 3rd phase and was expected to be completed by late-2024. Other major economic sectors in the town include timber, blacksmithing, and small-scale agriculture.

== Transportation ==
Obuasi train station is on the Ashanti railway line to and from Kumasi (59.4 km (36.9 mi) or 1 hour 2 minutes south-west of Kumasi). The only airport in the town is the Obuasi Airport. It has a runway length of 1,600 by 30 m (5,249 by 98 ft) and was developed from a former airstrip. It was inaugurated on 30 August 2012 and is operated by Gianair on behalf of the owners.

== Geography ==
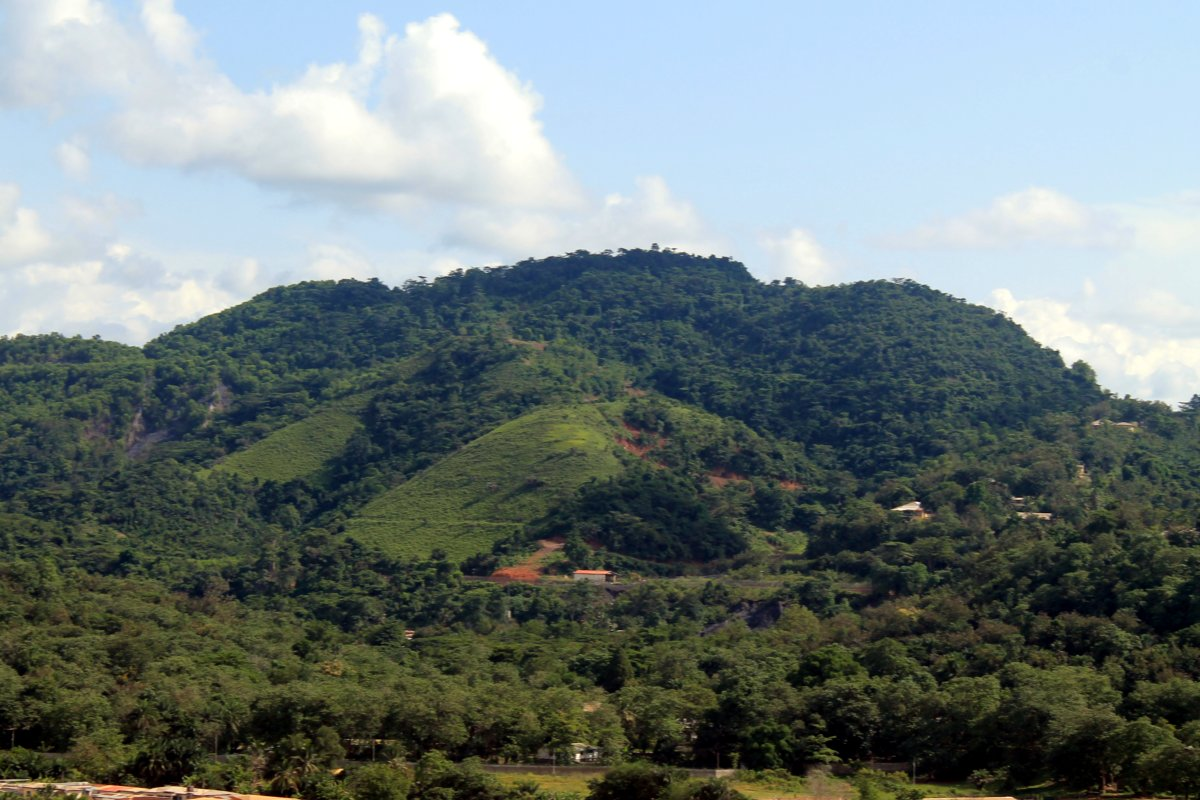
Series of hills surrounding the Sports Club in Obuasi

=== Location ===
Obuasi is located in the Obuasi Municipal which has a total land mass of 220.7 km^{2} (85.2 sq mi). The municipal is bordered by Adansi South to the south, Amansie West to the west and northwest, and to the east and northeast, Adansi North.

=== Climate ===
Obuasi has a semi-equatorial tropical savanna climate (Köppen climate classification Aw) with two rainy seasons. The main rainy season is from March to July, with May and June being typically the year's wettest months, whilst a lighter rainy season occurs from September to November. The average annual rainfall in Obuasi is around 1,270 millimetres or 50 inches and the average temperature 26.5 °C or 79.7 °F with highs of 30 °C or 86 °F and lows of 23 °C or 73.4 °F. Relative humidity is around 75% - 80% in the wet seasons.

Climate data for Obuasi
Month	Jan	Feb	Mar	Apr	May	Jun	Jul	Aug	Sep	Oct	Nov	Dec	Year
Mean daily maximum °C (°F)	32 (89)	31 (87)	31 (87)	31 (87)	32 (89)	29 (84)	27 (80)	27 (80)	26 (79)	30 (86)	32 (89)	32 (89)	30 (86)
Mean daily minimum °C (°F)	24 (75)	24 (76)	24 (76)	25 (77)	25 (77)	24 (75)	23 (73)	22 (71)	21 (70)	24 (75)	24 (76)	24 (76)	24 (75)
Average rainfall mm (inches)	25 (1.0)	25 (1.0)	76 (3.0)	130 (5.0)	200 (8.0)	230 (9.0)	100 (4.0)	25 (1.0)	76 (3.0)	150 (6.0)	130 (5.0)	100 (4.0)	1,267 (50)
Source: Myweather2.com

== Human resources ==
=== Education ===
Obuasi is the site of Obuasi Senior High Technical School, a coeducational second cycle public high school. Christ the King Catholic Senior High School, St. Margaret Senior High School, and the College of Integrated Health Care are other schools that can be found in the town. Kwame Nkrumah University of Science and Technology also has a campus in the town.

=== Health ===
The town is home to numerus healthcare facilities, such as the AGA Hospital, owned and operated by AngloGold Ashanti, and St. Jude Hospital, owned by Dr George Owusu-Asiedu.

=== Sports ===
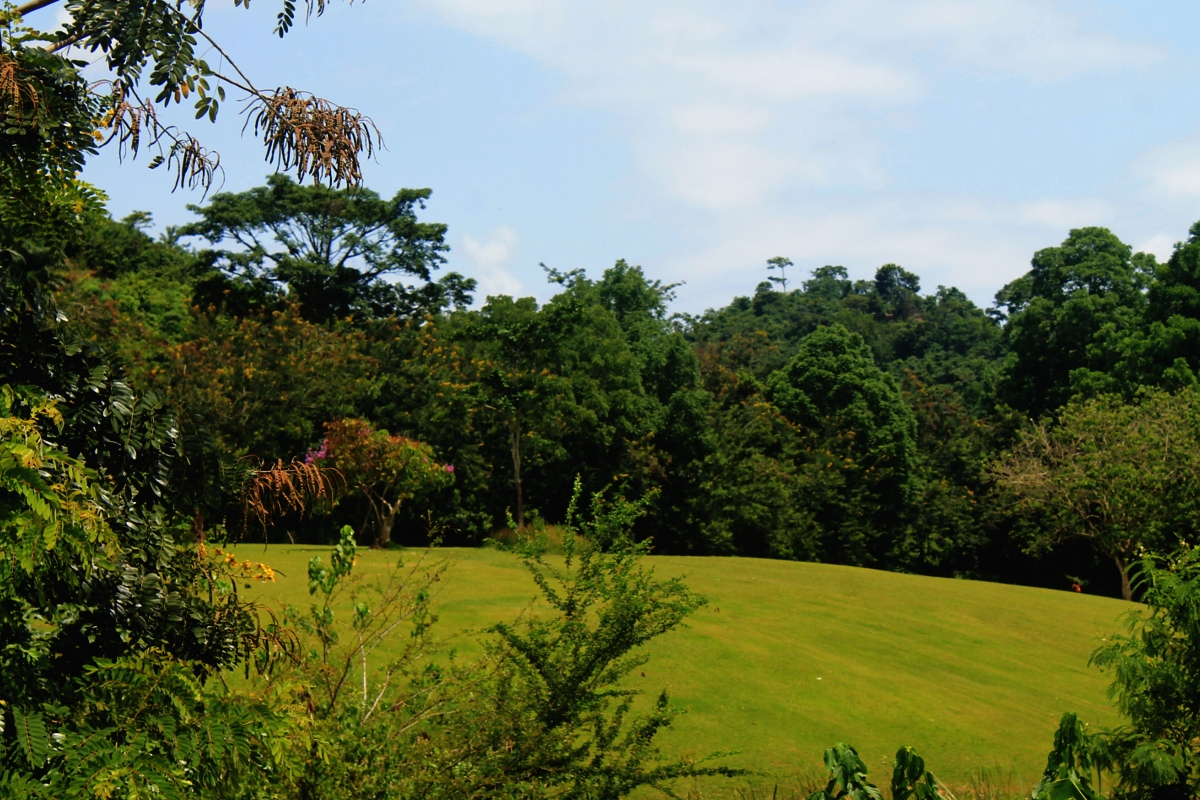
View of Obuasi's golf course

Obuasi has a golf course, which hosts the annual Obuasi Captain's Golf Tournament. The Ashanti Gold Sporting Club, a professional football club, is located in the town and is based at Len Clay Stadium.

== Notable people ==
- Sam E. Jonah (KBE) (born 1949), the former CEO of Ashanti Goldfields Company
- Jonathan Mensah (born 1982), Ghanaian footballer
- John Mensah (born 1990), Ghanaian footballer.
- Hannah Awadzi, journalist and disability rights advocate

== Sister cities ==
Obuasi sister cities is of the following:

- (United States) Riverside, California

== See also ==
- Obuasi Gold Mine
