= Adansi North District =

- District
- Districts of Ashanti Region

- Location of Adansi North District within Ashanti
- Coordinates: 6°17′N 1°31′W
- Country: Ghana
- Region: Ashanti
- Capital: Fomena

Government
  - District Chief Executive: Alhaji Abdul Kofi Latef Majdoub

Area
  - Total: 828 km^{2} (320 sq mi)

Population (2021)
  - Total: 54,155
  - Density: 65.4/km^{2} (169/sq mi)
- Time zone: UTC+0 (Greenwich Mean Time)
  - Summer (DST): GMT

Adansi North District is one of the forty-three districts in Ashanti Region, Ghana. Originally it was created from parts of two former districts on 17 February 2004: Adansi West District and Adansi East District; thus the remaining parts had been absorbed into parts of Obuasi Municipal District and Adansi South District respectively. On 15 March 2018, the southeast part of the district was split off to create Adansi Asokwa District. The district is located in the southern part of Ashanti Region and has Fomena as its capital town.

== Economy ==
Adansi North District contains six major natural forest reserves, and Obuasi Gold Mine the ninth (9th) largest gold mine on Planet Earth.

== Education ==
The Adansi North District has 195 schools and 4 major hospitals.

Fomena as the district capital has the district education office.

== Tourism ==
The Kwapia shrine is a major tourist attraction in the Adansi North District.

== Sources ==
- "Adansi North District". Statoids.
