= Obuasi Municipal Assembly =

- Municipal District
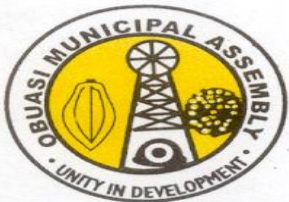
- Seal

- Districts of Ashanti Region

- Location of Obuasi Municipal District within Ashanti
- Coordinates: 6°12′N 1°41′W
- Country: Ghana
- Region: Ashanti
- Capital: Obuasi

Government
  - Municipal Chief Executive: FAUSTILOVE APPIAH KANNIN

Area
  - Total: 96.42 km^{2} (37.23 sq mi)

Population (2021)
  - Total: 104,297
  - Density: 1,082/km^{2} (2,802/sq mi)
- Time zone: UTC+0 (GMT)

Obuasi Municipal Assembly is one of the forty-three districts in Ashanti Region, Ghana. Originally it was formerly part of the then-larger Adansi West District in 1988, until part of the district was split off to create Obuasi Municipal District on 15 December 2003 (effectively 17 February 2004); whose remaining parts had been absorbed into parts of Adansi North District and Adansi South District respectively. Later, the eastern part of the district was split off to create Obuasi East District on 15 March 2018; thus the remaining part has been retained as Obuasi Municipal Assembly. The municipality is the southern part of Ashanti Region and has Obuasi as its capital town.

== Resources ==
The city is well known for its natural resource: gold.

== Geography ==
The Municipality is located at the southern part of Ashanti between latitude 5.35N and 5.65N and longitude 6.35N and 6.90N. It covers a land area of 1624 km^{2}. There are 53 villages in the Municipality which share 19 electoral areas. It is bounded to the east by the Adansi South District, west by Amansie Central District and to the north by the Adansi North District. It has Obuasi as its Administrative Capital, where the famous and rich Obuasi Gold Mine is located.

=== Climate and topography ===
The Municipality has a rather undulating topography and the climate is of the semi-equatorial type with a double rainfall regime. Mean annual rainfall ranges between 1250mm and 1750mm. Mean average annual temperature is 25.5 °C and relative humidity is 75% - 80% in the wet season.

The vegetation is predominantly a degraded and semi-deciduous forest. The forest consists of limited species of hardwood which are harvested as lumber. The Municipality has nice scenery due to the hilly nature of the environment.

== Sources ==
- "Obuasi Municipal District". Statoids.
- GhanaDistricts.com
