= Diploma in Nursing =

Academic degree

A Diploma in Nursing or Nursing Diploma is an entry-level tertiary education nursing credential.

== Background ==
In the United States, this diploma is usually awarded by hospital-based nursing schools. Diploma programs in the United States require 2–3 years of training prior to graduation. Students awarded a Diploma in Nursing are qualified to take the NCLEX-RN exam and apply for licensure as a Registered Nurse.

At one time, all nurses in the United States were diploma-prepared. The Cherry Ames series of children's books was created to encourage girls to go into the nursing profession during World War II. She was a "hospital diploma" nurse.

Although the number of hospital-based nursing schools continues to decrease, many still exist. Some require that non-nursing prerequisite courses be completed at another school prior to admission or coordinate their program with classes at a nearby school, though many are still self-contained.

Some hospital-based nursing programs with colleges offer cooperative programs that grant students a Diploma in Nursing, and a Bachelor of Science in Nursing (BSN).

Nurses in other countries may also have diplomas, such as Practical Nurses in Canada, which complete a 2-3 diploma equivalent or greater in length to an associate degree in nursing completed the United States.

== See also ==
- Associate of Science in Nursing
- Bachelor of Science in Nursing
- Master of Science in Nursing
- Doctor of Nursing Practice
- Nurse education
