= Bunda people =

Bunda People
Regions with significant populations
- Kwilu Province

Languages
- Mpuono language

Religion
- Christianity; traditional African religion

The Bunda people or (also Ambuun and Mbuun) are an ethnic group that mostly live in Idiofa Territory of Kwilu Province, Democratic Republic of the Congo. They speak the Mpuono language, spoken by an estimated 165,000 people as of 1972.

== Location ==
The Belgian colonial administration originally gave Idiofa Territory the name of "Babunda Territory" after the Bunda people, who formed the majority of the population. They are still the most important group in the center of Idiofa territory. The Bunda are the majority of the population of the administrative center of Idiofa. There are also Bunda populations in Bulungu Territory and Gungu Territory.

== Economy ==
The Bundu territory has a tropical climate with alternating dry and rainy seasons. The region has abundant water resources, the most important rivers being the Lubwe, Loange, Kamtsha and the Piopio. Precipitation in the rainy season is so intense that it is a major obstacle to farming and a time when food may be scarce. Hunting and fishing are individual activities during this period. Food is abundant in the dry season, the main season for communal hunting and fishing.

== Sources ==
- "Mpuono: A language of Democratic Republic of the Congo". Ethnologue.
- Munzumi, Jean-Macaire Munzele (2006). Les pratiques de sociabilité en Afrique: les mutations culinaires chez les Ambuun. Editions Publibook. ISBN 978-2-7483-1056-6.
- "PLAN STRATÉGIQUE DE LA CARITAS-DEVELOPPEMENT IDIOFA". Diocese of Idiofa.
- RDC Ministère du Plan (April 2005). "MONOGRAPHIE DE LA PROVINCE DU BANDUNDU" (PDF).
- Schwetz, J (1924). "Le territoire de la Kamtsha-Lubue (district du Kasai)" (PDF). Rapport sur les travaux de la mission médicale antitrypanosomique du Kwango-Kasaï 1920-1923. Vol. 4. Bruxelles: Goemaere, Imprimeur Du Roi.
