= List of crossings of the Congo River =

This is a list of bridges and ferry crossings of the Congo River and its major tributaries.

== Crossings ==
Bridges and ferry crossings of the Congo River and major tributaries.
Caption:: railway and road bridge,: road bridge,: ferry.

Crossing	Type	Location	River	Date Opened	State	Coordinates Lat. Long.
Matadi Bridge	road and rail bridge	Kongo Central, Democratic Republic of the Congo	Congo	1983	open	5°49′28″S 13°26′2″E
Kongolo Bridge	road and rail bridge	Tanganyika Province, Democratic Republic of the Congo	Lualaba	1939/1968	open	5°20′50″S 27°0′34″E
Kabalo Bridge	road and rail bridge	Tanganyika Province, Democratic Republic of the Congo	Lualaba	1956	open	6°8′26″S 26°55′24″E
Bukama Bridge	rail bridge	Haut-Lomami, Democratic Republic of the Congo	Lualaba	1928	open	9°11′42″S 25°51′25″E
Bukama Road Bridge	road bridge	Haut-Lomami, Democratic Republic of the Congo	Lualaba	?	open	9°11′5″S 25°49′25″E
Kisenda Bridge	rail bridge	Lualaba Province, Democratic Republic of the Congo	Lualaba	?	open	10°46′53″S 25°43′32″E
Kisenda Road Bridge	road bridge	Lualaba Province, Democratic Republic of the Congo	Lualaba	?	open	10°46′52″S 25°43′31″E
Niangara Bridge	road bridge	Haut-Uele, Democratic Republic of Congo	Uele	?	open	3°41′48″N 27°53′44″E
Dungu Bridge	road bridge	Haut-Uele, Democratic Republic of Congo	Kibali	?	open	3°36′53″N 28°33′42″E
Kalimva Bridge	road bridge	Haut-Uele, Democratic Republic of Congo	Kibali	?	open	3°6′14.6″N 29°33′13.3″E
Pont-Kwango Bridge	road bridge	Kwango, Democratic Republic of Congo	Kwango	?	open	4°39′36.4″S 16°31′24.9″E
Luebo Bridge	road bridge	Kasai, Democratic Republic of Congo	Lulua	?	open	5°20′10.4″S 21°24′49.7″E
Kananga Bridge	road bridge	Kasai, Democratic Republic of Congo	Lulua	?	open	5°54′19.6″S 22°18′48.4″E
Sanduwa Bridge	road bridge	Kasai, Democratic Republic of Congo	Lulua	?	open	9°41′39.3″S 22°51′31.1″E
Diongo Bridge	road and rail bridge	Kasai, Democratic Republic of Congo	Lulua	?	open	10°37′29.5″S 22°51′14.9″E
Kinganga Ferry	ferry	Kongo Central, Democratic Republic of the Congo	Congo	n/a	open	5°17′20.4″S 13°44′13.0″E
Luozi Ferry	ferry	Kongo Central, Democratic Republic of the Congo	Congo	n/a	open	4°57′3.3″S 14°9′6.9″E
Brazzaville–Kinshasa Bridge	road and rail bridge	Brazzaville, Republic of the Congo; Kongo Central, Democratic Republic of the Congo	Congo	2028	currently operates as a vehicle ferry	4°57′3.3″S 14°9′6.9″E
Isangi	ferry	Tshopo, Democratic Republic of the Congo	Congo	n/a	open	0°48′0.8″N 24°16′31.8″E
Ubundu	ferry	Tshopo, Democratic Republic of the Congo	Lualaba	n/a	open	3°18′33.9″S 17°35′18.5″E
Bendela	ferry	Tshopo, Democratic Republic of the Congo	Kasai	n/a	open	0°22′17.7″S 25°26′8.3″E
Bandundu	ferry	Kwilu Province, Democratic Republic of the Congo	Kwilu	n/a	open	3°18′36.6″S 17°21′46.4″E
Bandundu	ferry	Kwilu Province, Democratic Republic of the Congo	Kwilu	n/a	open	3°23′10.8″S 17°23′52.3″E
Bagata	ferry	Kwilu Province, Democratic Republic of the Congo	Kwilu	n/a	open	3°44′7.5″S 17°57′3.3″E
Bagata	ferry	Kwilu Province, Democratic Republic of the Congo	Kwilu	n/a	open	3°44′12.3″S 17°57′9.7″E
PopoKanaka	ferry	Kwango Province, Democratic Republic of the Congo	Kwango	n/a	open	4°19′0.3″S 20°02′0.7″E
Loange	ferry	Kasai Province, Democratic Republic of the Congo	Loange	n/a	open	4°19′0.3″S 20°02′0.7″E

== Source ==
- Google Maps
