= Eolo, Democratic Republic of the Congo =

Eolo
- Location within Democratic Republic of the Congo
- Coordinates: 3.7053°S 18.90378°E
- Country: Democratic Republic of the Congo
- Province: Kwilu Province
- Territory: Idiofa Territory

Eolo is a community in Idiofa Territory, in the Kwilu Province of the Democratic Republic of the Congo. It lies on the south shore of the Kasai River just downstream from the mouth of the Kamtsha River.
