= List of bridges in the Democratic Republic of the Congo =

== Major bridges ==
	Name	Span	Length	Type	Carries Crosses	Opened	Location	Province	Ref.
1	Matadi Bridge	520 m (1,710 ft)	722 m (2,369 ft)	Suspension; Steel truss deck, steel pylons 91+520+91	National Road 1 Congo River	1983	Matadi; 5°49′31.4″S 13°26′3.1″E	Kongo Central	
2	Brazzaville–Kinshasa Bridge project	420 m (1,380 ft)	1,695 m (5,561 ft)	Cable-stayed; Composite steel/concrete truss deck, concrete pylons Rail-road bridge	Tripoli–Cape Town Highway; Trans-African Highway 3 Congo River	2028	Kinshasa–Brazzaville	Kinshasa; Republic of the Congo	(Note: Three sites are envisaged on either side of Mbamu Island: downstream between the two capitals, in N'Gombé or upstream in Maluku. The crossings are then composed either of two cable-stayed bridges with 240 metres (790 ft) main spans on the two waterways or of a single structure with a 420 metres (1,380 ft) main span.)

== See also ==
- Transport in the Democratic Republic of the Congo
- List of roads in the Democratic Republic of the Congo
- Rail transport in the Democratic Republic of the Congo
- Geography of the Democratic Republic of the Congo
- List of rivers of the Democratic Republic of the Congo
- List of crossings of the Congo River

== Notes and references ==
- Notes
- References
