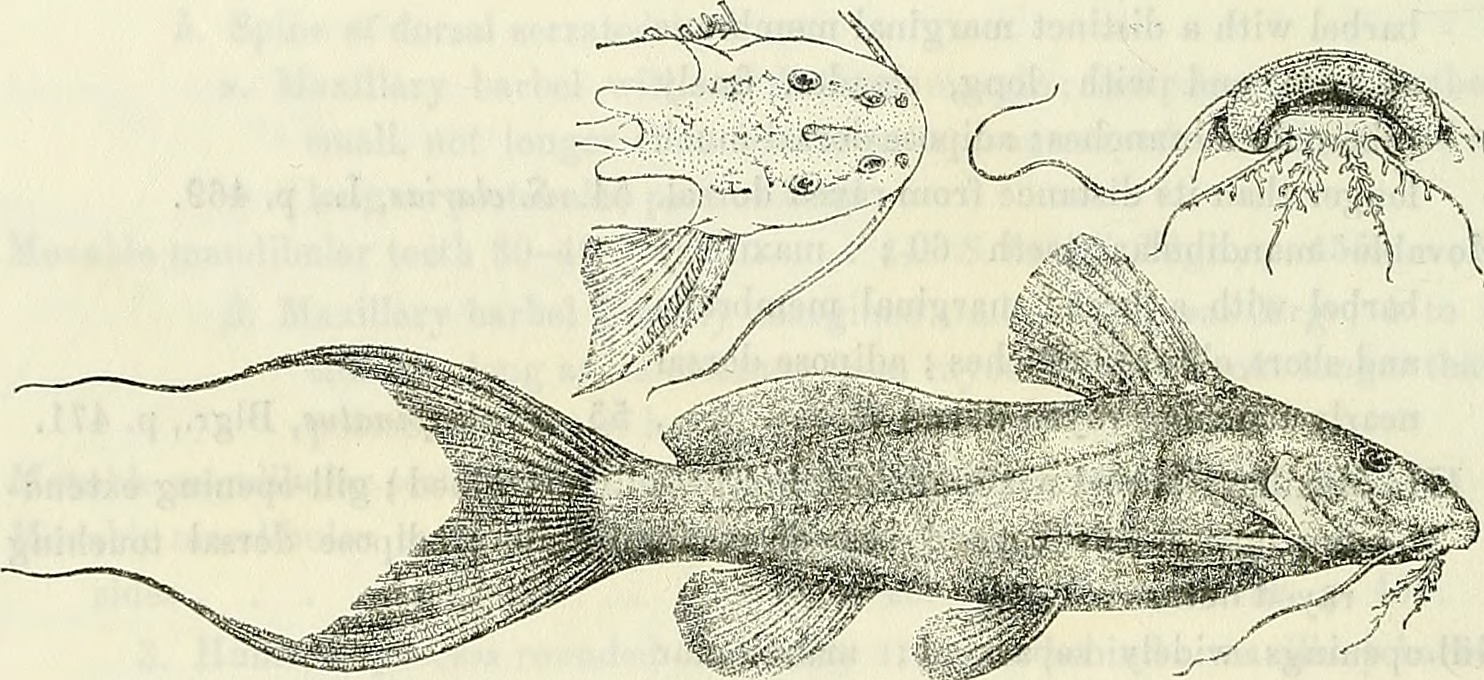

Conservation status
- Least Concern (IUCN 3.1)

Scientific classification
- Kingdom: Animalia
- Phylum: Chordata
- Class: Actinopterygii
- Order: Siluriformes
- Family: Mochokidae
- Genus: Synodontis
- Species: S. caudalis

Binomial name
- Synodontis caudalis Boulenger, 1899

= Synodontis caudalis =

Species of fish

Synodontis caudalis, known as the filament tailed synodontis, or the whiptail synodontis, is a species of upside-down catfish native to the Democratic Republic of the Congo. It was first described by Belgian-British zoologist George Albert Boulenger in 1899, from specimens collected in what is now the Democratic Republic of the Congo. The species name caudalis comes from the Latin word cauda, meaning tail, and refers to the elongated filaments in the caudal fin of the species.

== Description ==
Like all members of the genus Synodontis, S. caudalis has a strong, bony head capsule that extends back as far as the first spine of the dorsal fin. The head contains a distinct narrow, bony, external protrusion called a humeral process. The shape and size of the humeral process helps to identify the species. In S. caudalis, the humeral process is narrow and sharply pointed.

The fish has three pairs of barbels. The maxillary barbels are on located on the upper jaw, and two pairs of mandibular barbels are on the lower jaw. The maxillary barbel is straight without any branches. It extends 1 1/2 to 1 2/3 the length of the head. The outer pair of mandibular barbels is longer than the inner pair, and is about 2/3 the length of the head.

The front edges of the dorsal fins and the pectoral fins of Syntontis species are hardened into stiff spines. In S. caudalis, the spine of the dorsal fin is short, about 2/3 the length of the head, smooth in the front and serrated on the back. The remaining portion of the dorsal fin is made up of seven branching rays. The spine of the pectoral fin about as long as the dorsal fin spine, and serrated on both sides. The adipose fin is 4 to 5 times as long as it is deep. The anal fin contains three unbranched and eight to nine branched rays. The tail, or caudal fin, is forked, with both lobes ending in a long filament.

All members of Syndontis have a structure called a premaxillary toothpad, which is located on the very front of the upper jaw of the mouth. This structure contains several rows of short, chisel-shaped teeth. In S. caudalis, the toothpad forms a long and moderately broad band. On the lower jaw, or mandible, the teeth of Syndontis are attached to flexible, stalk-like structures and described as "s-shaped" or "hooked". The number of teeth on the mandible is used to differentiate between species; in S. caudalis, there are 70 to 80 teeth on the mandible.

The body color is a uniform brownish.

The maximum total length of the species is 20.4 centimetres (8.0 in). Generally, females in the genus Synodontis tend to be slightly larger than males of the same age.

== Habitat and behavior ==
In the wild, the species has been found in the rapids of the lower Congo River system and Pool Malebo. It has also been found in the Fimi River and from portions of the Kasai River system. The reproductive habits of most of the species of Synodontis are not known, beyond some instances of obtaining egg counts from gravid females. Spawning likely occurs during the flooding season between July and October, and pairs swim in unison during spawning. As a whole, species of Synodontis are omnivores, consuming insect larvae, algae, gastropods, bivalves, sponges, crustaceans, and the eggs of other fishes. The growth rate is rapid in the first year, then slows down as the fish age.
