= Geography of the Democratic Republic of the Congo =

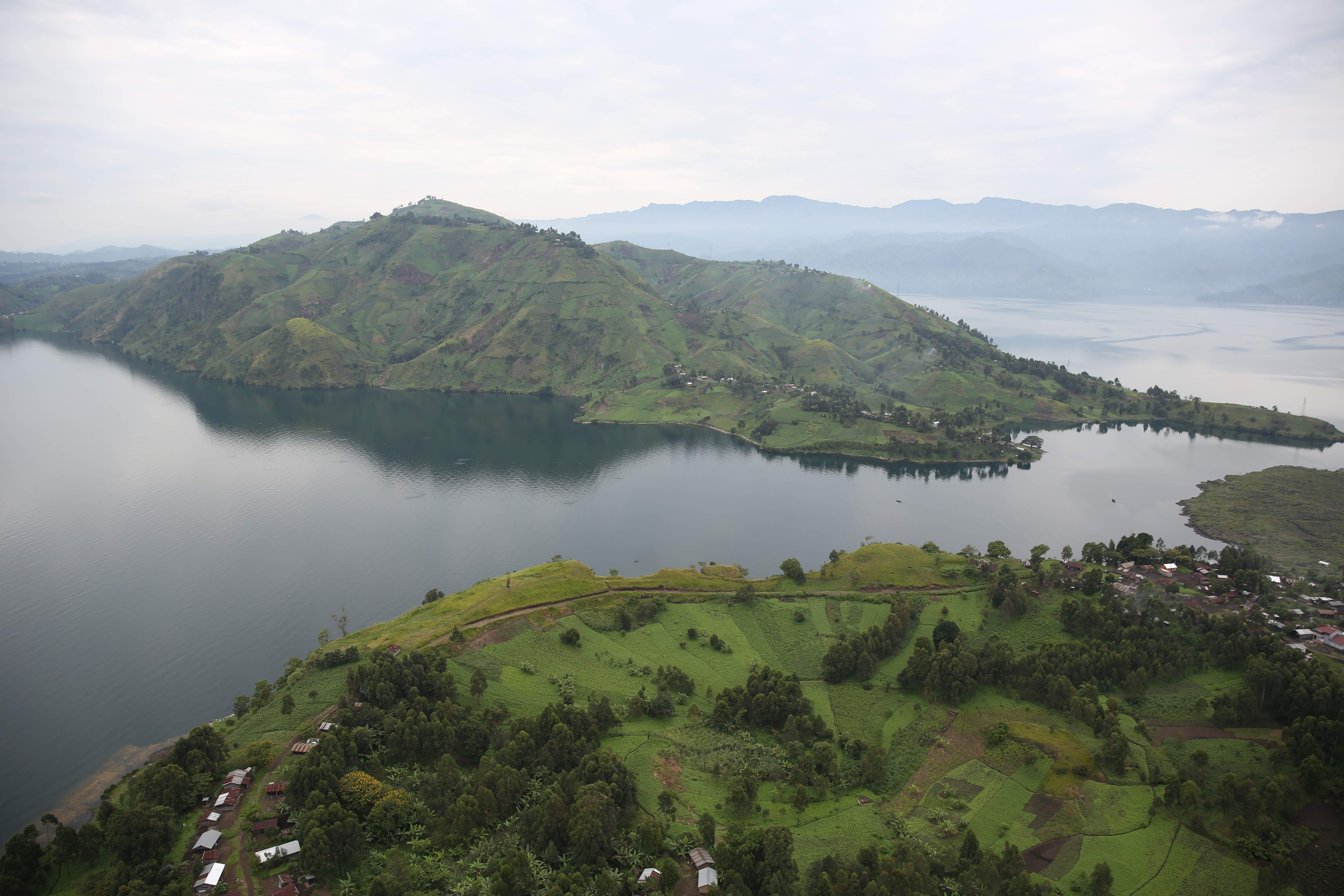
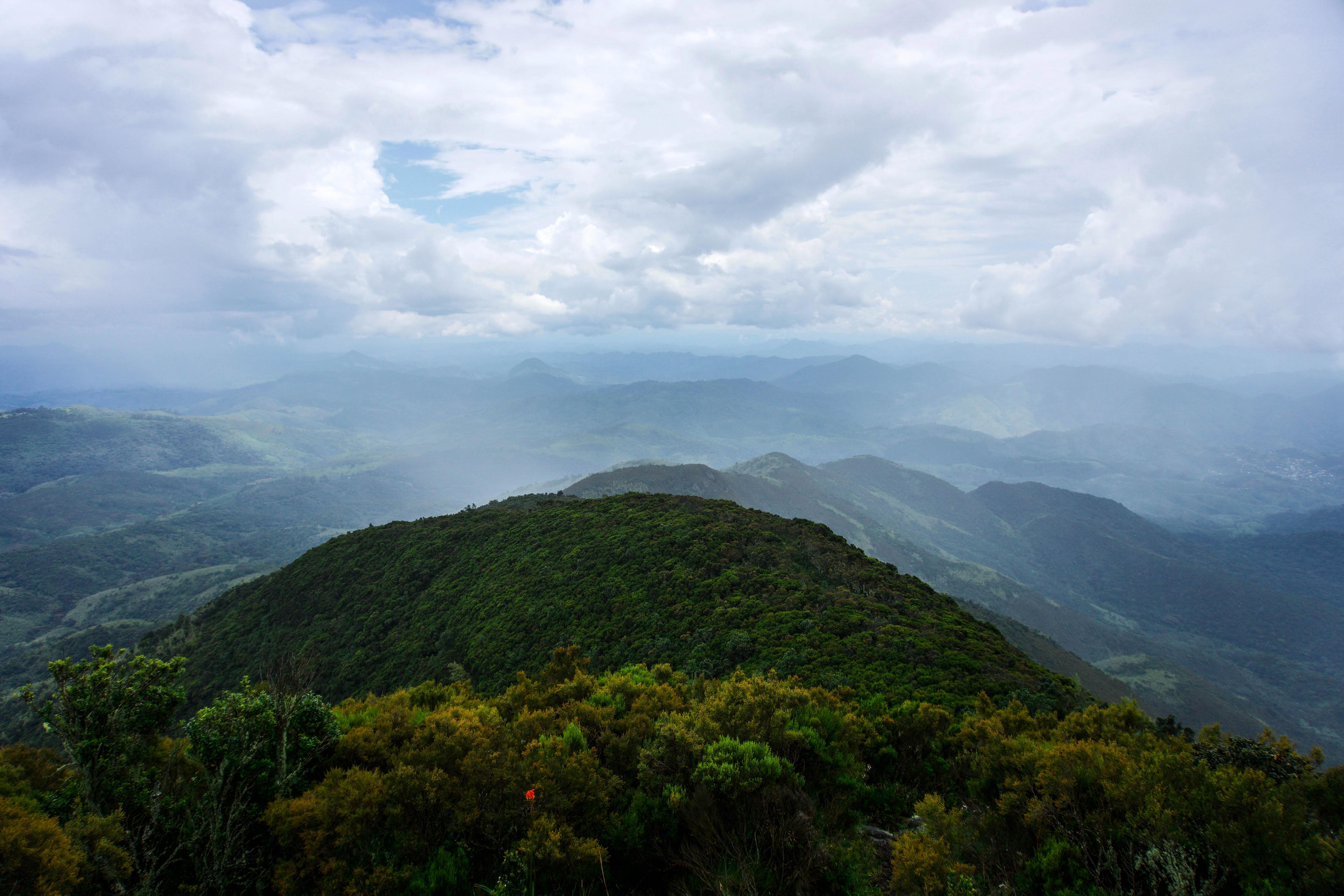
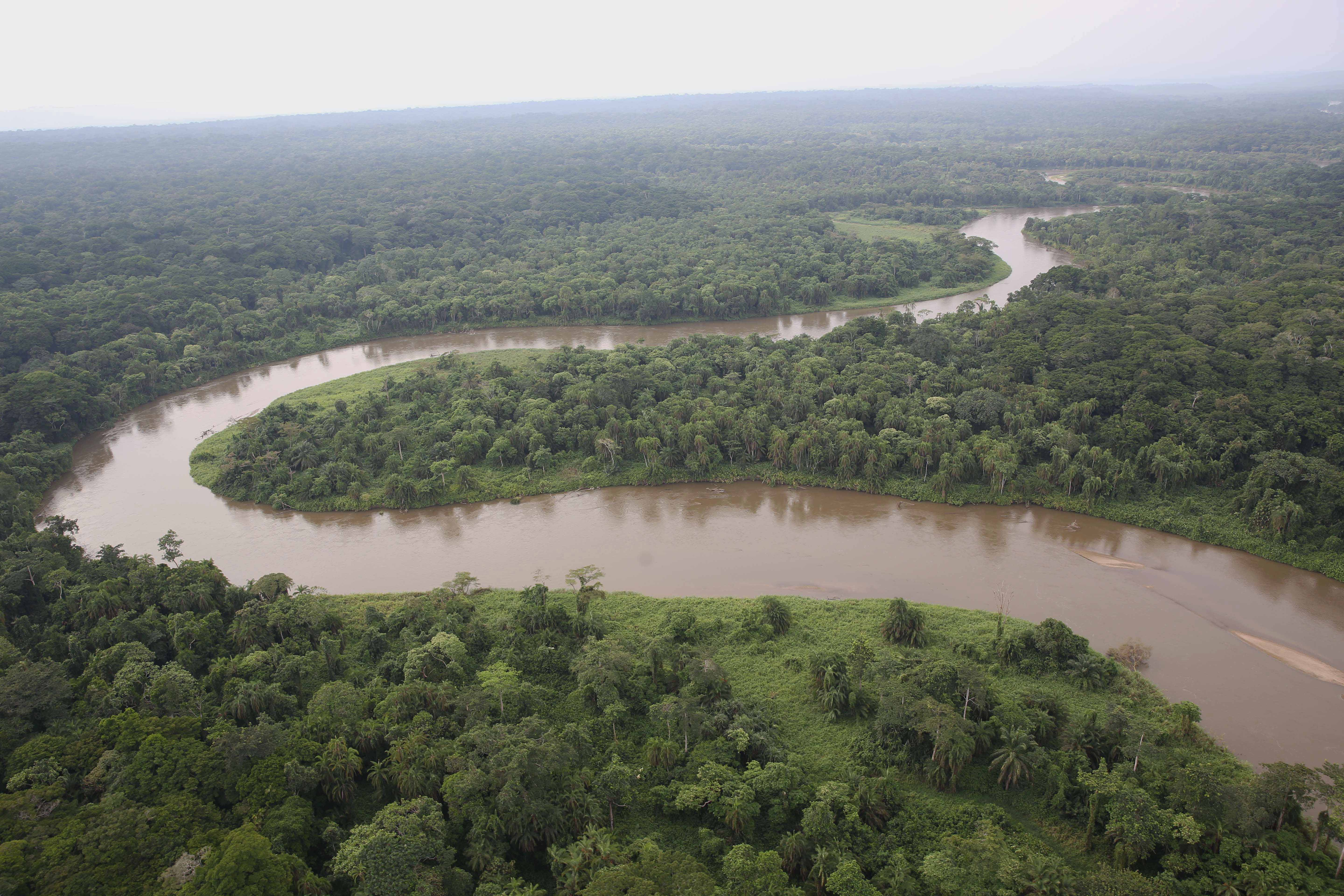
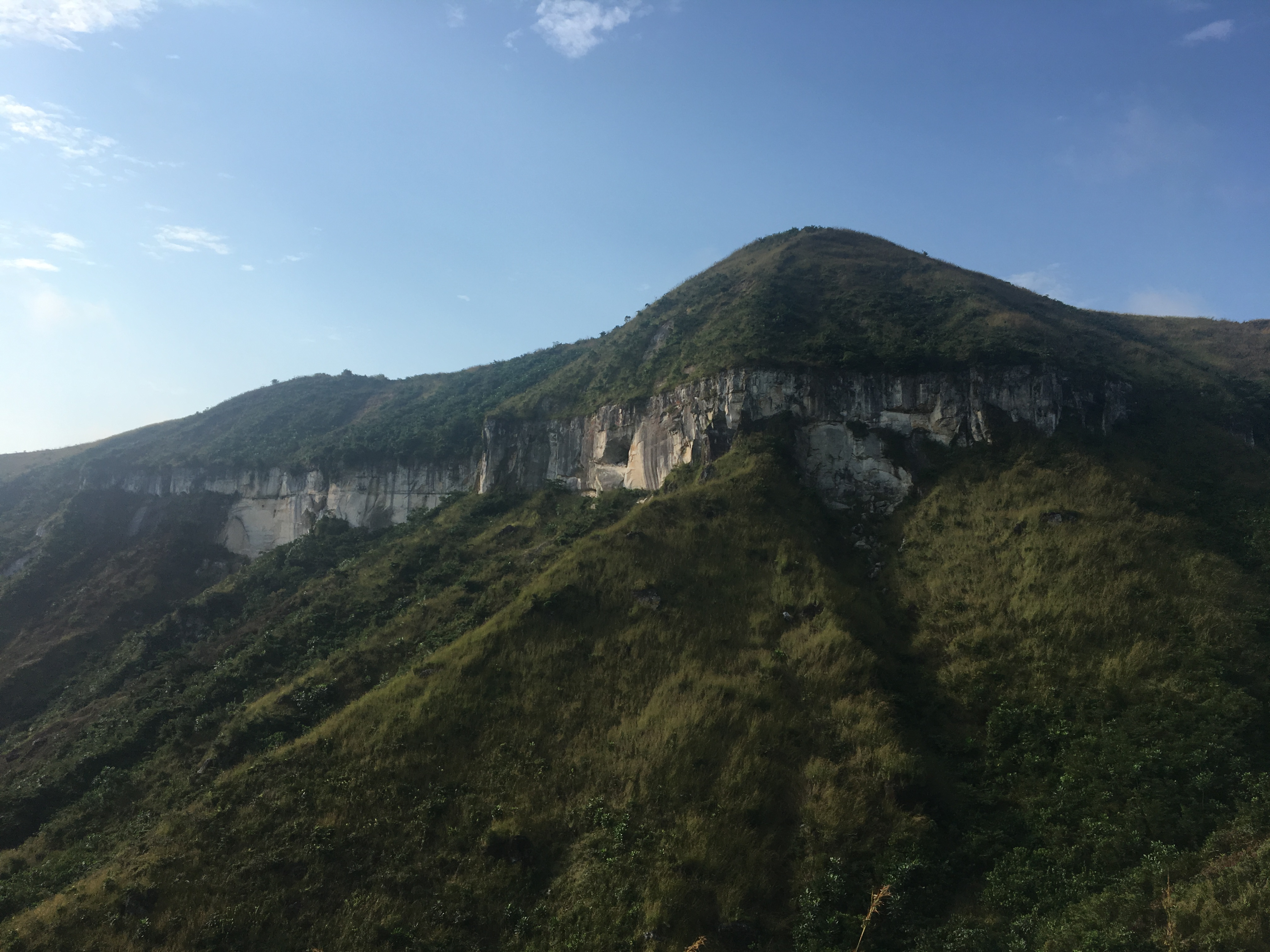
Geography in Congo-Kinshasa, clockwise from the top: Lake Kivu, Kahuzi-Biéga National Park, the Congo River, Mount Mangengenge.

The Democratic Republic of the Congo is the largest country of sub-Saharan Africa, occupying 2,344,858 square kilometres (905,355 sq mi). The country lies on the equator. Most of the country lies within the vast hollow of the Congo River Basin. The vast, low-lying central area is a plateau-shaped basin sloping toward the west, covered by tropical rainforest and criss-crossed by rivers.

The forest center is surrounded by mountainous terraces in the west, plateaus merging into savannas in the south and southwest. Dense grasslands extend beyond the Congo River in the north. High mountains of the Ruwenzori Range, some above 5,000 m or 16,000 ft, are found on the eastern borders with Rwanda and Uganda as part of the Albertine Rift montane forests.

== Geographic regions ==
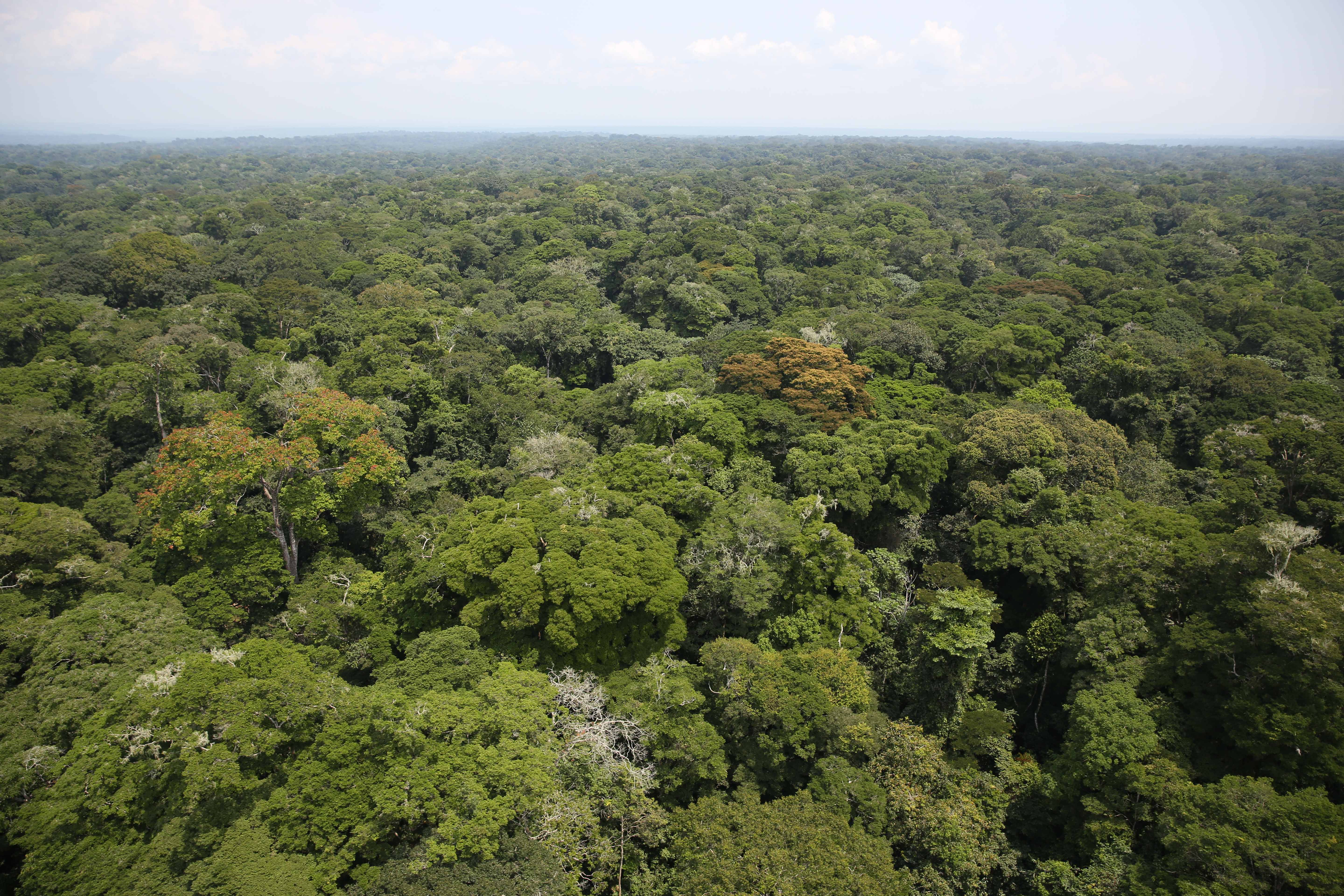
The Ituri Rainforest

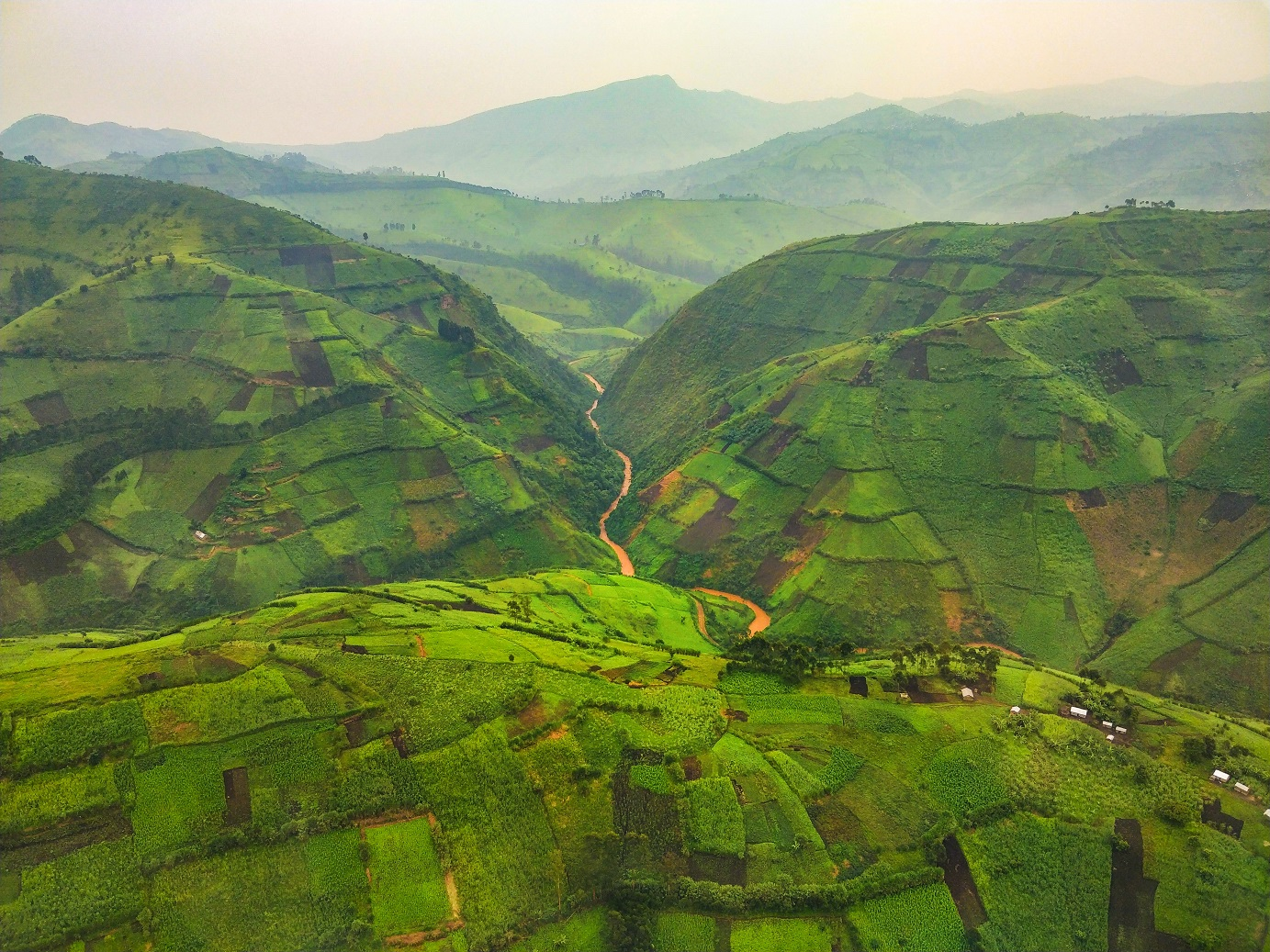
Masisi Territory

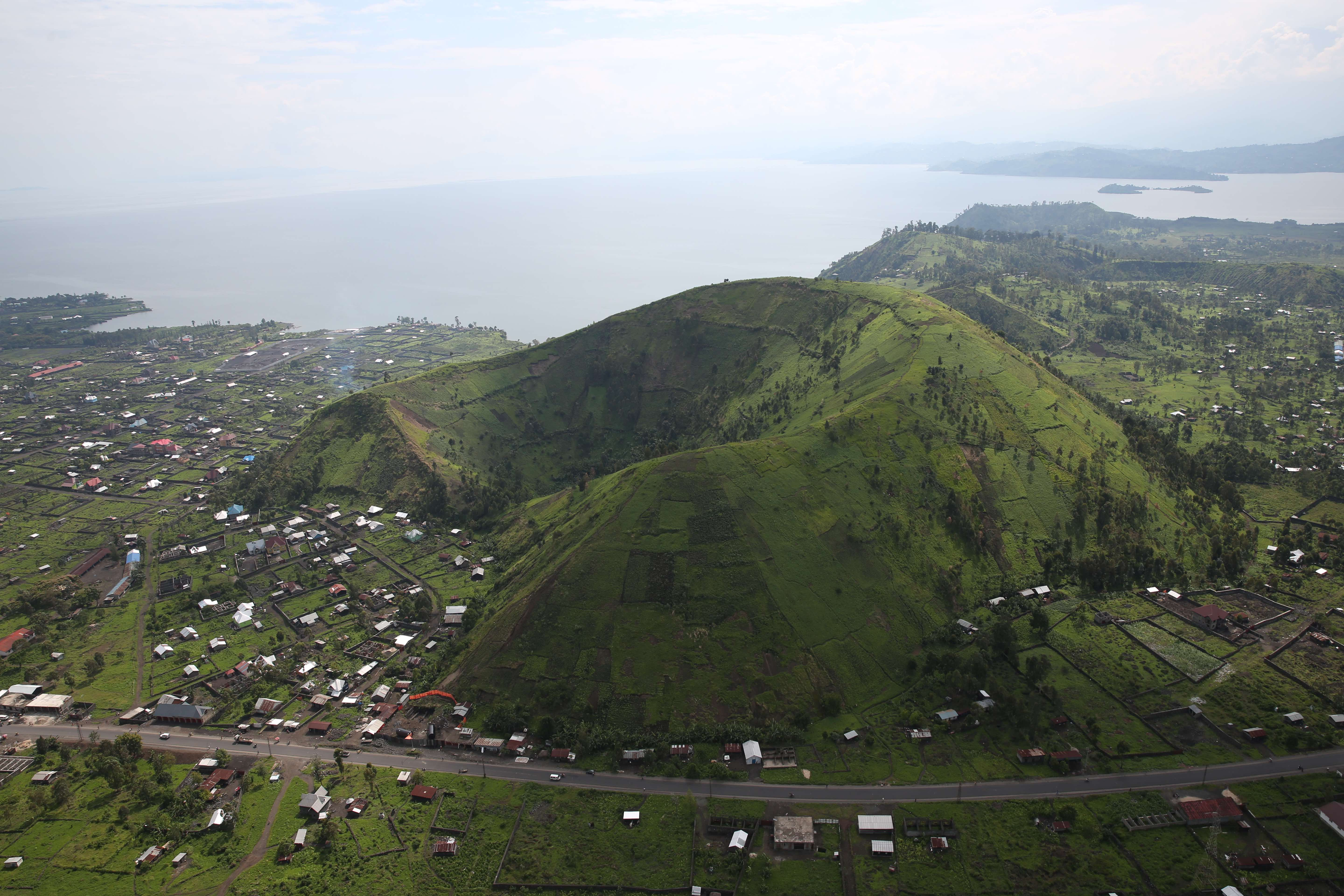
Lake Kivu in North Kivu province

Several major geographic regions may be defined in terms of terrain and patterns of natural vegetation, namely the central Congo Basin, the uplands north and south of the basin, and the eastern highlands.

The DRC's core region is the central Congo Basin. Having an average elevation of about 44 metres (144 ft), it measures roughly 800,000 square kilometres (310,000 sq mi), constituting about a third of the DRC's territory. Much of the forest within the basin is swamp, and still more of it consists of a mixture of marshes and firm land.

North and south of the basin lie higher plains and, occasionally, hills covered with varying mixtures of savanna grasses and woodlands. The southern uplands region, like the basin, constitutes about a third of the DRC's territory. The area slopes from south to north, starting at about 1,000 metres (3,300 ft) near the Angolan border and falling to about 500 metres (1,600 ft) near the basin. Vegetation cover in the southern uplands territory is more varied than that of the northern uplands.

In some areas, woodland is dominant; in others, savanna grasses predominate. South of the basin, along the streams flowing into the Kasai River are extensive gallery forests. In the far southeast, most of the former Katanga Province is characterized by somewhat higher plateaus and low mountains. The westernmost section of the DRC, a partly forested panhandle reaching the Atlantic Ocean, is an extension of the southern uplands that drops sharply to a very narrow shore about 40 kilometres (25 mi) long.

In the much narrower northern uplands, the cover is largely savanna, and woodlands are rarer. The average elevation of this region is about 600 metres (2,000 ft), but it rises as high as 900 metres (3,000 ft) where it meets the western edge of the eastern highlands.

The eastern highlands region is the highest and most rugged portion of the country. It extends for more than 1,500 kilometres (930 mi) from above Lake Albert to the country's southern tip and varies in width from 80 to 560 kilometres (50 to 348 mi). Its hills and mountains range in altitude from about 1,000 metres (3,300 ft) to more than 5,000 metres (16,000 ft). The western arm of the Great Rift Valley forms a natural eastern boundary to this region. The eastern border of the DRC extends through the valley and its system of lakes, which are separated from each other by plains situated between high mountain ranges.

In this region, changes in elevation bring marked changes in vegetation, which ranges from montane savanna to heavy montane forest. The Rwenzori Mountains between lakes Albert and Edward constitutes the highest range in Africa. The height and location of these mountains on the equator make for a varied and spectacular flora.

== Rivers and lakes ==
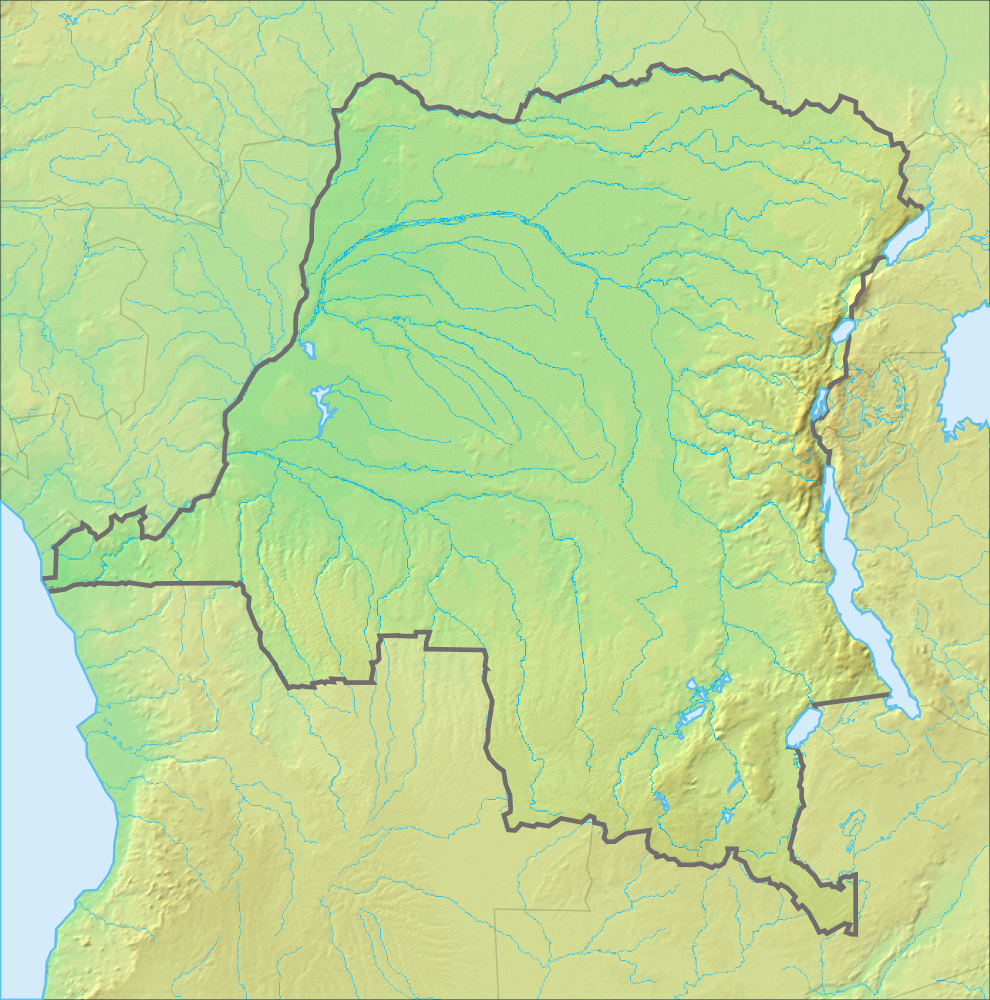
A topographic map of the DRC

The Congo River and its tributaries drain this basin and provide the country with the most extensive network of navigable waterways in Africa. Ten kilometres (6 miles) wide at the mid-point of its length, the river carries a volume of water that is second only to the Amazon's. Its flow is unusually regular because it is fed by rivers and streams from both sides of the equator; the complementary alternation of rainy and dry seasons on each side of the equator guarantees a regular supply of water for the main channel. At points where navigation is blocked by rapids and waterfalls, the sudden descent of the river creates a hydroelectric potential greater than that found in any other river system on earth.

Most of the DRC is served by the Congo River system, a fact that has facilitated both trade and outside penetration. Its network of waterways is dense and evenly distributed through the country, with three exceptions: northeastern Mayombe in Kongo Central in the west, which is drained by a small coastal river called the Shilango; a strip of land on the eastern border adjoining lakes Edward and Albert, which is part of the Nile River basin; and a small part of the extreme southeastern DRC, which lies in the Zambezi River basin and drains into the Indian Ocean.

Most of the DRC's lakes are also part of the Congo River basin. In the west are Lac Mai-Ndombe and Lac Tumba, which are remnants of a huge interior lake that once occupied the entire basin prior to the breach of the basin's edge by the Congo River and the subsequent drainage of the interior. In the southeast, Lake Mweru straddles the border with Zambia. On the eastern frontier, Lac Kivu, Central Africa's highest lake and a key tourist center, and Lake Tanganyika, just south of Lac Kivu, both feed into the Lualaba River, the name often given to the upper extension of the Congo River. Only the waters of the eastern frontier's northernmost great lakes, Edward and Albert, drain north, into the Nile Basin.

== Climate ==
A map of Köppen climate classification zones in the DRC

Climate ranges from tropical rain forest in the Congo River basin to tropical wet-and-dry in the southern uplands, to tropical highland in eastern areas above 2,000 metres (6,600 ft) in elevation. In general, temperatures and humidity are quite high. The highest and least variable temperatures are in the equatorial forest, where daytime highs range between 30 and 35 °C (86 and 95 °F), and nighttime lows rarely go below 20 °C (68 °F). The average annual temperature is about 25 °C (77 °F).

In the southern uplands, particularly in the far southeast Katanga region, winters are cool and dry. Summers are warm and damp. The chain of lakes from Lake Albert to Lake Tanganyika in the eastern highlands has a moist climate and a narrow but not excessively warm temperature range. The mountain sections are cooler. Humidity increases with altitude until the saturation point is reached. A nearly constant falling mist prevails on some slopes, particularly in the Rwenzori Mountains.

The seasonal pattern of rainfall is affected by the DRC's straddling of the equator. In the third of the country that lies north of the equator, the dry season, roughly early November to late March, corresponds to the rainy season in the southern two-thirds. There is great variation, and a number of places on either side of the equator have two wet and two dry seasons.

Rainfall averages range from about 1,000 to 2,000 millimetres (39 to 79 in). Annual rainfall is highest in the heart of the Congo River basin and in the highlands west of Bukavu, and tends to diminish in direct relation to distance from these areas. The only areas marked by long four-month to five-month dry seasons and occasional droughts are parts of the Southeast.

Climate data for Kinshasa, Democratic Republic of the Congo
Month	Jan	Feb	Mar	Apr	May	Jun	Jul	Aug	Sep	Oct	Nov	Dec	Year
Record high °C (°F)	36 (97)	36 (97)	38 (100)	37 (99)	37 (99)	37 (99)	32 (90)	33 (91)	35 (95)	35 (95)	37 (99)	34 (93)	38 (100)
Mean daily maximum °C (°F)	30.6 (87.1)	31.3 (88.3)	32.0 (89.6)	32.0 (89.6)	31.1 (88.0)	28.8 (83.8)	27.3 (81.1)	28.9 (84.0)	30.6 (87.1)	31.1 (88.0)	30.6 (87.1)	30.1 (86.2)	30.4 (86.7)
Daily mean °C (°F)	25.9 (78.6)	26.4 (79.5)	26.8 (80.2)	26.9 (80.4)	26.3 (79.3)	24.0 (75.2)	22.5 (72.5)	23.7 (74.7)	25.4 (77.7)	26.2 (79.2)	26.0 (78.8)	25.6 (78.1)	25.5 (77.9)
Mean daily minimum °C (°F)	21.2 (70.2)	21.6 (70.9)	21.6 (70.9)	21.8 (71.2)	21.6 (70.9)	19.3 (66.7)	17.7 (63.9)	18.5 (65.3)	20.2 (68.4)	21.3 (70.3)	21.5 (70.7)	21.2 (70.2)	20.6 (69.1)
Record low °C (°F)	18 (64)	20 (68)	18 (64)	20 (68)	18 (64)	15 (59)	10 (50)	12 (54)	16 (61)	17 (63)	18 (64)	16 (61)	10 (50)
Average precipitation mm (inches)	163 (6.4)	165 (6.5)	221 (8.7)	238 (9.4)	142 (5.6)	9 (0.4)	5 (0.2)	2 (0.1)	49 (1.9)	98 (3.9)	247 (9.7)	143 (5.6)	1,482 (58.4)
Average precipitation days	12	12	14	17	12	1	0	1	6	10	16	14	115
Average relative humidity (%)	83	82	81	82	82	81	79	74	74	79	83	83	80
Mean monthly sunshine hours	136	141	164	153	164	144	133	155	138	149	135	127	1,739
Source 1: Climate-Data.org (temperature) Weatherbase (extremes)
Source 2: Danish Meteorological Institute (precipitation, sun, and humidity)

Climate data for Kisangani
Month	Jan	Feb	Mar	Apr	May	Jun	Jul	Aug	Sep	Oct	Nov	Dec	Year
Record high °C (°F)	36 (97)	36 (97)	36 (97)	35 (95)	34 (93)	34 (93)	33 (91)	33 (91)	34 (93)	34 (93)	35 (95)	35 (95)	36 (97)
Mean daily maximum °C (°F)	31 (88)	31 (88)	31 (88)	31 (88)	31 (88)	30 (86)	29 (84)	28 (82)	29 (84)	30 (86)	29 (84)	30 (86)	30.0 (86.0)
Daily mean °C (°F)	26 (79)	26 (79)	26 (79)	26 (79)	26 (79)	25.5 (77.9)	24 (75)	24 (75)	24.5 (76.1)	25 (77)	24.5 (76.1)	25 (77)	25.2 (77.4)
Mean daily minimum °C (°F)	21 (70)	21 (70)	21 (70)	21 (70)	21 (70)	21 (70)	19 (66)	20 (68)	20 (68)	20 (68)	20 (68)	20 (68)	20.4 (68.7)
Record low °C (°F)	17 (63)	18 (64)	17 (63)	18 (64)	18 (64)	18 (64)	17 (63)	17 (63)	17 (63)	18 (64)	18 (64)	16 (61)	16 (61)
Average rainfall mm (inches)	53 (2.1)	84 (3.3)	178 (7.0)	158 (6.2)	137 (5.4)	114 (4.5)	132 (5.2)	165 (6.5)	183 (7.2)	218 (8.6)	198 (7.8)	84 (3.3)	1,620 (63.8)
Mean monthly sunshine hours	187	170	187	180	187	150	124	125	150	186	150	155	1,951
Source: BBC Weather Centre Kisangani

Climate data for Mbuji-Mayi
Month	Jan	Feb	Mar	Apr	May	Jun	Jul	Aug	Sep	Oct	Nov	Dec	Year
Mean daily maximum °C (°F)	30.4 (86.7)	30.6 (87.1)	31.4 (88.5)	31.6 (88.9)	32.6 (90.7)	32.5 (90.5)	32.2 (90.0)	31.5 (88.7)	31.4 (88.5)	30.9 (87.6)	30.7 (87.3)	30.3 (86.5)	31.3 (88.4)
Daily mean °C (°F)	25.2 (77.4)	25.3 (77.5)	25.9 (78.6)	25.9 (78.6)	26.1 (79.0)	25.1 (77.2)	24.9 (76.8)	25.3 (77.5)	25.5 (77.9)	25.3 (77.5)	25.3 (77.5)	25.2 (77.4)	25.4 (77.7)
Mean daily minimum °C (°F)	20.1 (68.2)	20.1 (68.2)	20.4 (68.7)	20.3 (68.5)	19.7 (67.5)	17.7 (63.9)	17.6 (63.7)	19.1 (66.4)	19.7 (67.5)	19.8 (67.6)	20 (68)	20.2 (68.4)	19.6 (67.2)
Average precipitation mm (inches)	150 (5.9)	133 (5.2)	202 (8.0)	161 (6.3)	66 (2.6)	20 (0.8)	9 (0.4)	32 (1.3)	140 (5.5)	157 (6.2)	233 (9.2)	207 (8.1)	1,510 (59.5)
Source: Climate-Data.org, altitude: 614m

Climate data for Lubumbashi
Month	Jan	Feb	Mar	Apr	May	Jun	Jul	Aug	Sep	Oct	Nov	Dec	Year
Mean daily maximum °C (°F)	26 (79)	26 (79)	26 (79)	27 (81)	26 (79)	25 (77)	25 (77)	27 (81)	30 (86)	31 (88)	28 (82)	26 (79)	27 (81)
Daily mean °C (°F)	21 (70)	21 (70)	21 (70)	20.5 (68.9)	18 (64)	16.5 (61.7)	16.5 (61.7)	18 (64)	21 (70)	23 (73)	22 (72)	21 (70)	20.0 (67.9)
Mean daily minimum °C (°F)	16 (61)	16 (61)	16 (61)	14 (57)	10 (50)	8 (46)	8 (46)	9 (48)	12 (54)	15 (59)	16 (61)	16 (61)	13 (55)
Average rainfall mm (inches)	253 (10.0)	257 (10.1)	202 (8.0)	60 (2.4)	4 (0.2)	1 (0.0)	0 (0)	0 (0)	4 (0.2)	37 (1.5)	163 (6.4)	257 (10.1)	1,238 (48.9)
Average rainy days	24	23	21	9	2	0	0	0	1	5	17	24	126

=== Climate change ===
As of 2023, the DRC is the 18th highest emitting nation of greenhouse gases and the highest emitter on the African continent. The majority of these emissions arise from land use change and deforestation, as the country uses little fossil fuel and only one-fifth of the population has access to electricity. The DRC is one of the most vulnerable nations to climate change and the least prepared to deal with its impacts. Climate change in the DRC is predicted to cause more frequent and intense floods, droughts and exacerbated disease epidemics. Sectors vulnerable to climate change include agriculture, forestry and energy.

== Data ==
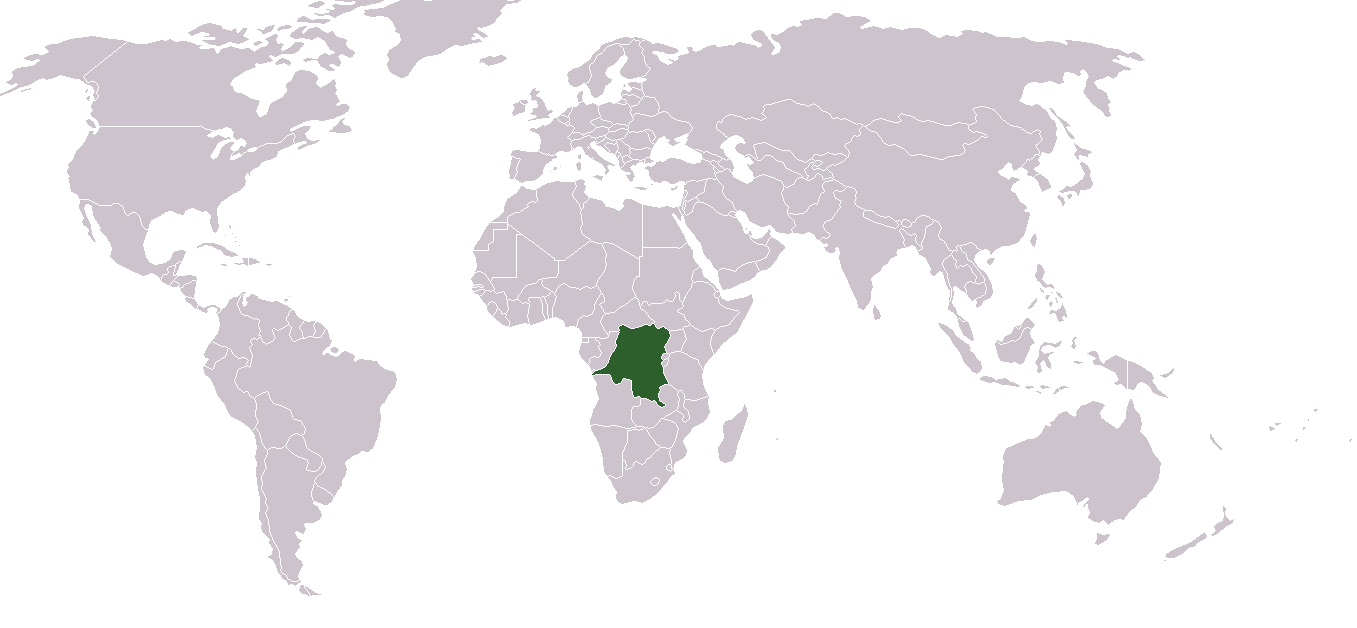
The Location of the DRC on a world map

Area:
Total: 2,344,858 km^{2}
Land: 2,267,048 km^{2}
Water: 77,810 km^{2}

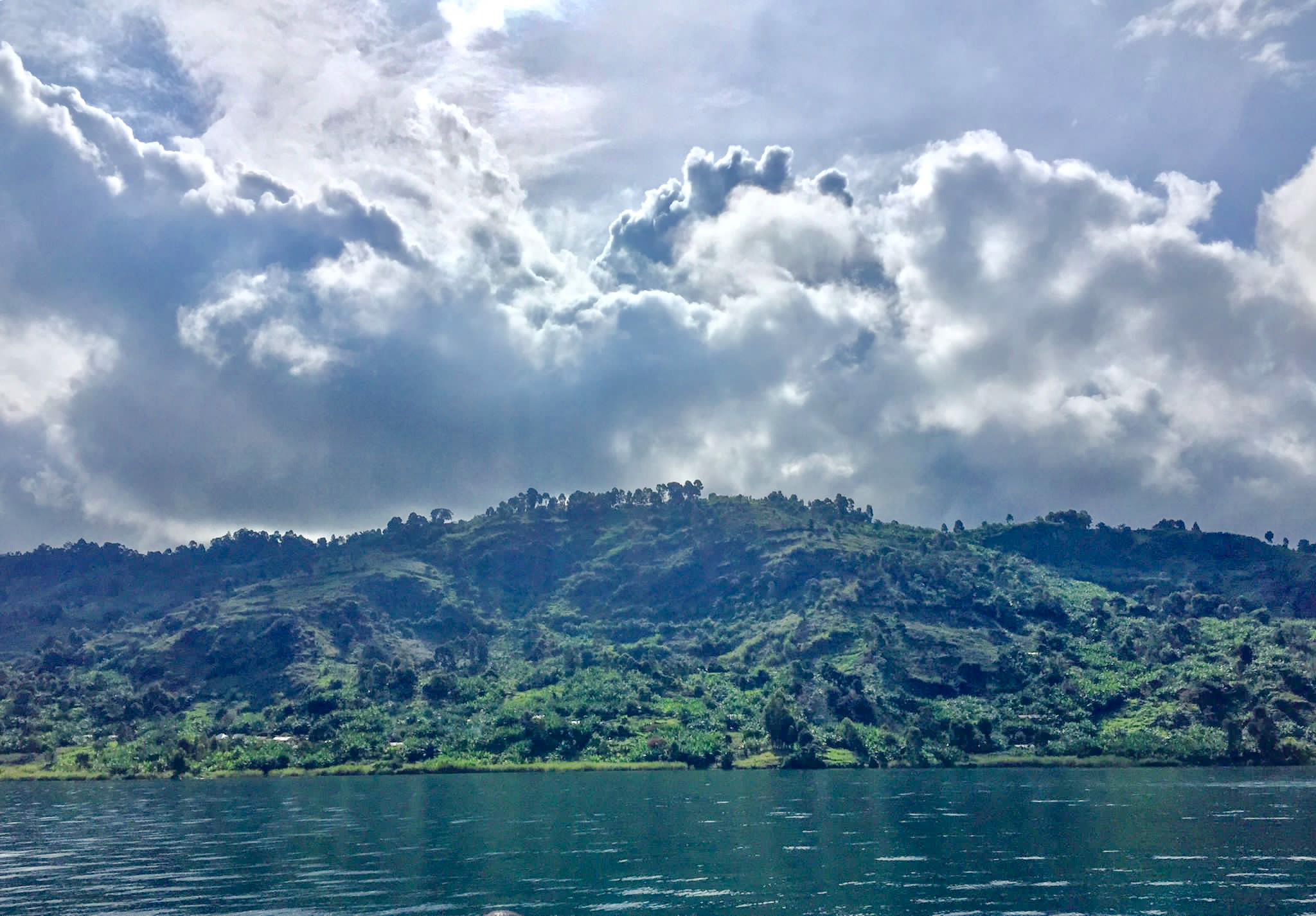
Idjwi in South Kivu.

Area - comparative:

- 11th-largest country in the world (and 2nd in Africa)
- smaller than Algeria but larger than Greenland and Saudi Arabia
- about 1/4 the size of the United States as a whole
- Australia comparative: slightly smaller than Western Australia
- Canada comparative: slightly less than twice the size of the Northwest Territories
- About 10 times the size of Romania

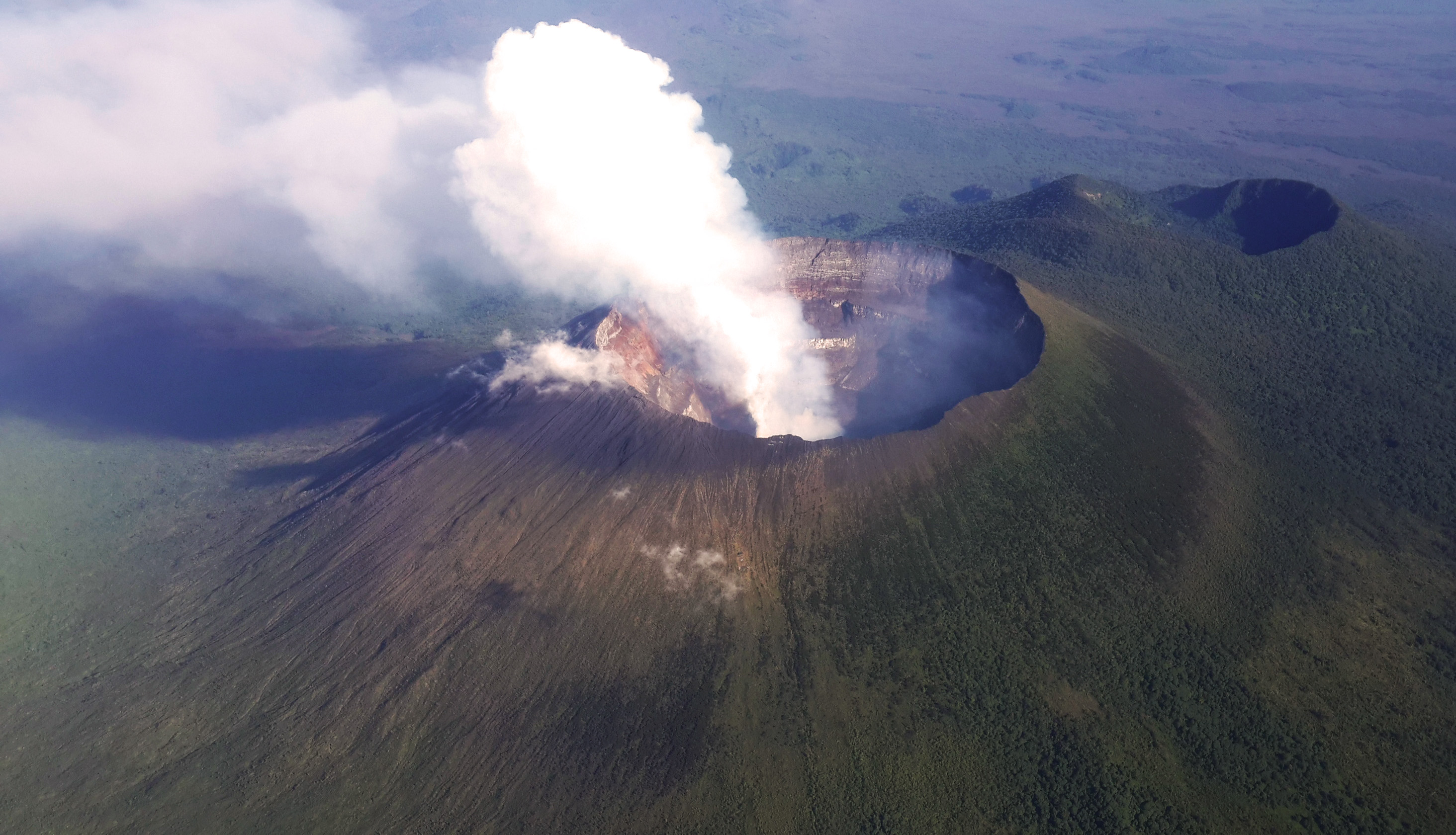
Mount Nyiragongo, which last erupted in 2021.

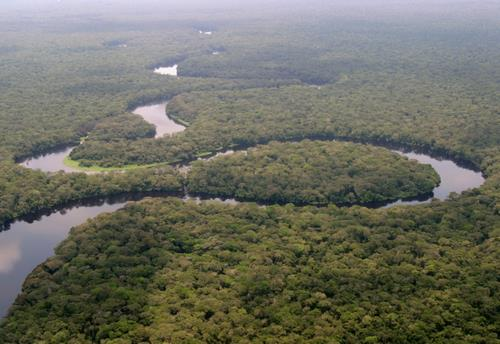
Salonga National Park.

Land boundaries:
Total: 10,481 km
Border countries: "Angola 2,646 km, Burundi 236 km, Central African Republic 1,747 km, Republic of the Congo 1,229 km, Rwanda 221 km, South Sudan 714 km, Tanzania 479 km, Uganda 877 km, Zambia 2,332 km"

Coastline: 37 km (23 mi).

Maritime claims:
territorial sea: 12 nmi (22 km)
exclusive economic zone: boundaries with neighbors

Climate: tropical; hot and humid in equatorial river basin; cooler and drier in southern highlands; cooler-cold and wetter in eastern highlands and the Ruwenzori Range; north of Equator - wet season April to October, dry season December to February; south of Equator - wet season November to March, dry season April to October

Terrain: vast central plateau covered by tropical rainforest, surrounded by mountains in the west, plains and savanna in the south/southwest, and grasslands in the north. The high mountains of the Ruwenzori Range on the eastern borders.

Elevation extremes:
Lowest point: Atlantic Ocean 0 m
highest point: Pic Marguerite on Mont Ngaliema (Mount Stanley) 5,110 m

Natural resources: cobalt, copper, niobium, petroleum, industrial and gem diamonds, gold, silver, zinc, manganese, tin, uranium, coal, hydropower, timber

Land use:
arable land: 3.09%
permanent crops: 0.36% 96.55 (2012 est.)

Irrigated land: 105 km^{2} (2003)

Total renewable water resources: 1,283 km^{3} (2011)

== Freshwater withdrawal ==
Total: 0.68 km^{3}/yr (68% / 21% / 11%)

Per capita: 11.25 m^{3}/yr (2005)

Natural hazards

Periodic droughts in south; Congo River floods (seasonal); in the east, in the Albertine Rift, there are active volcanoes

== Environment ==
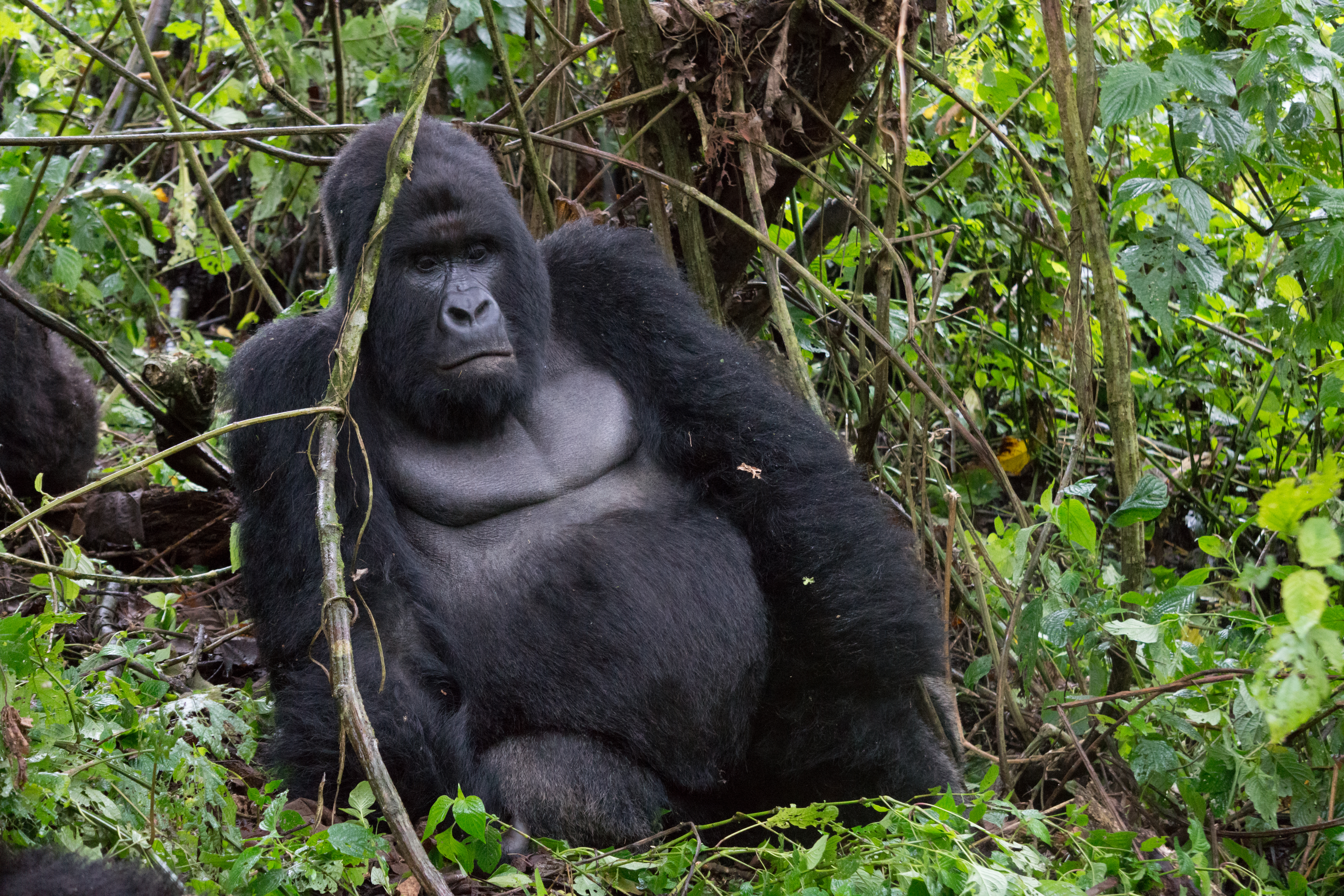
The endangered mountain gorilla; half of its population live in the DRC's Virunga National Park, making the park a critical habitat for these animals.

=== Current issues ===
Poaching threatens wildlife populations (for example, the African wild dog, Lycaon pictus, is now considered extirpated from the Congo due to human overpopulation and poaching); water pollution; deforestation (chiefly due to land conversion to agriculture by indigenous farmers); refugees responsible for significant deforestation, soil erosion, and wildlife poaching; mining of minerals (coltan — a mineral used in creating capacitors, diamonds, and gold) causing environmental damage.

=== International environmental agreements ===
Party to: Biodiversity, Desertification, Endangered Species, Hazardous Wastes, Law of the Sea, Marine Dumping, Nuclear Test Ban, Ozone Layer Protection, Tropical Timber 83, Tropical Timber 94, Wetlands
Signed, but not ratified: Environmental Modification

== Extreme points ==
This is a list of the extreme points of the Democratic Republic of the Congo, the points that are farther north, south, east or west than any other location.

- Northernmost point: Unnamed location on the border with the Central African Republic in the Bomu river immediately west of the town of Mbaga in CAR, Orientale Province
- Easternmost point: At the point where the northern section of the border with Uganda enters Lake Albert immediately west of Mahagi Port, Orientale Province
- Southernmost point: Unnamed location on the border with Zambia immediately to north-west of the Zambian town of Ndabala, Katanga province
- Westernmost point: The point at which the border with Cabinda enters the Atlantic Ocean, Kongo-Central province

== See also ==
- Subdivisions of the Democratic Republic of the Congo
- Democratic Republic of the Congo
- Former place names in the Democratic Republic of the Congo
