= Muleba, Democratic Republic of the Congo =

Coordinates: 5°23′07″S 21°22′26″E

Muleba is a small village in Kasai province, Democratic Republic of the Congo. The village is located on the Muleba Route, near the Lulua River, southwest of Luebo and between Kasongo, and Shamakata and Zembele. The village sits at an altitude of 538 metres (1,765 ft) above sea level.
