= Oshwe Airport =

- IATA: none; ICAO: FZBD

Summary
- Airport type: Public
- Serves: Oshwe
- Elevation AMSL: 1,150 ft / 351 m
- Coordinates: 3°25′20″S 19°25′15″E

Map
- Location of the airport in Democratic Republic of the Congo

Runways
Direction	Length		Surface
Direction	m	ft	Surface
05/23	900	2,953	Dirt
- Sources: HERE Maps GCM

Oshwe Airport (ICAO: FZBD) is an airport serving Oshwe, a town on the Lukenie River in Mai-Ndombe Province, Democratic Republic of the Congo. The runway is just west of the town.

== See also ==
- Transport in the Democratic Republic of the Congo
- List of airports in the Democratic Republic of the Congo
