= Dibaya-Lubwe =

- Location in the Democratic Republic of the Congo
- Coordinates: 4.15°S 19.86667°E
- Country: DR Congo
- Province: Kwilu
- Territory: Idiofa

Population (2012)
  - Total: 38,933
- Time zone: UTC+1 (West Africa Time)

Dibaya-Lubwe (or Dibaya Lubue, Lubue) is a town in the Kwilu Province of the Democratic Republic of the Congo. It is in Idiofa Territory. The town lies on the south shore of the Kasai River just below the point where it is joined by the Lubue River. As of 2012 the population was estimated to be 38,933.

The town is in eastern Ding territory. The first European visit it was German explorer Hermann von Wissmann in June 1885. It became the site for palm oil processing, and was granted the status of a "centre extra-coutumier". By 1931, the town had grown into a commercial center.

== 2024 landslide ==
Dibaya-Lubwe
- Date: 13 April 2024
- Location: Dibaya-Lubwe, Kwilu Province, Democratic Republic of the Congo
- Type: landslide
- Deaths: 15
- Injuries: 7
- Missing: 50-60

On 13 April 2024 heavy rains caused a ravine to collapse into a river in Dibaya-Lubwe leaving at least 15 dead, seven injured and 50-60 missing. It struck a boat that was docking at the time.

Poor urban planning and poor infrastructure in Congo are vulnerable to torrential rainfall.

== Sources ==
- "Bandundu: largest cities and towns and statistics of their population". World Gazetteer.
- Malu, Flavien Nkay (2007). La mission chrétienne à l'épreuve de la tradition ancestrale (Congo belge, 1891-1933): la croix et la chèvre. KARTHALA Editions. ISBN 978-2-84586-920-2.
