= Mushy =

Mushy may refer to:

- Tony Buckley (born 1980), Irish rugby union player nicknamed "Mushy"
- Mushy Callahan (1904–1986), ring name of American light welterweight champion boxer Vincent Morris Scheer
- Mushtaq Ahmed (cricketer), Pakistani cricketer and cricket coach

== See also ==
- Mushy peas, a thick green lumpy soup of prepared marrowfat peas
- Mushie, a town and territory in the Democratic Republic of the Congo
