= FIMI =

FIMI or Fimi may refer to:

- Foreign information manipulation and interference, a propaganda and disinformation tactic
- Federazione Industria Musicale Italiana, the chief organization of the Italian music recording industry
- Dimitra Fimi (born 1978), Greek academic and writer
- The Fimi River, in the Democratic Republic of the Congo
