= 2024 Kwa River disaster =

2024 ship sinking in the Democratic Republic of the Congo

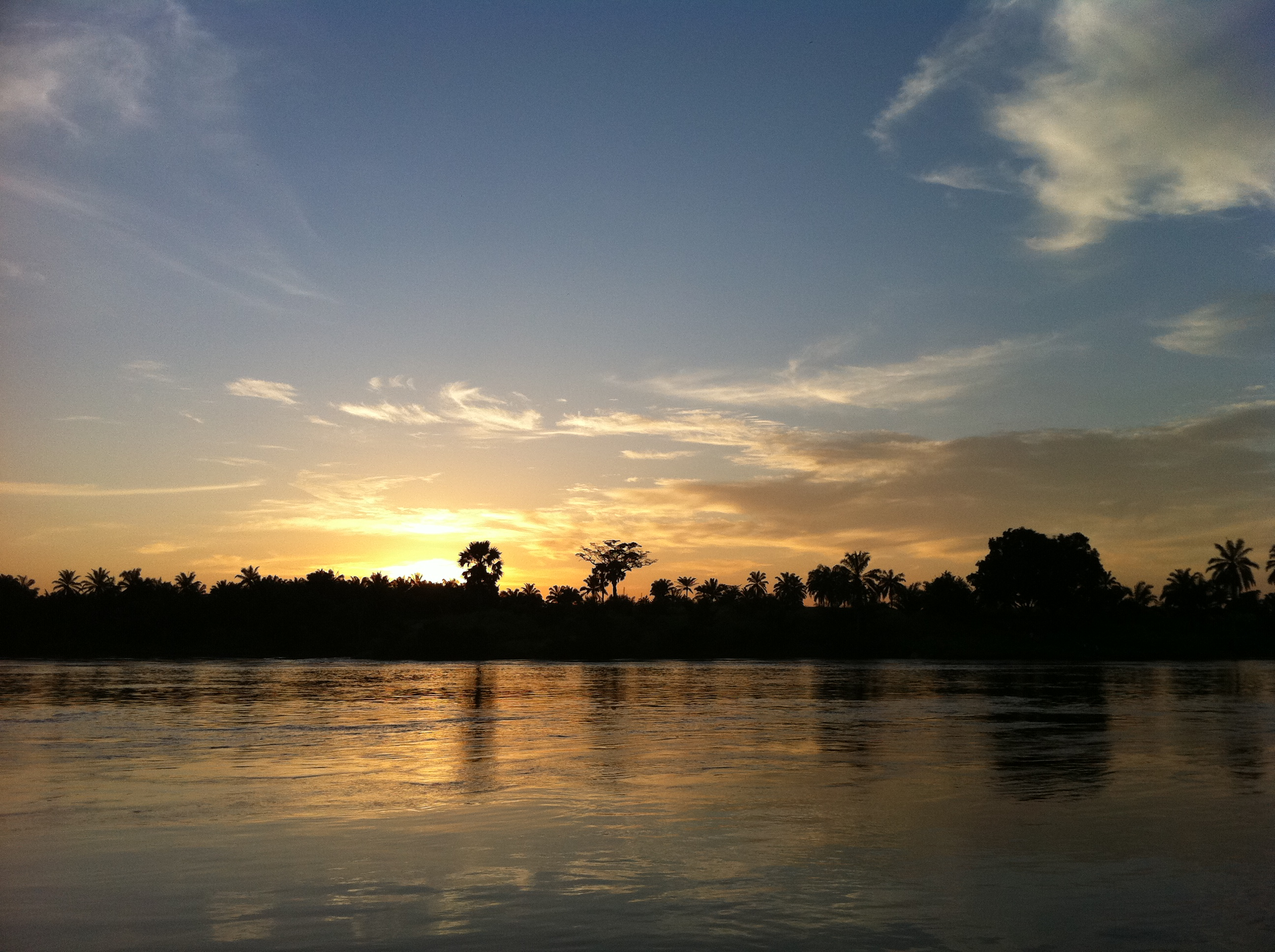
- Sunset view from Kalonda
- Date: 12 June 2024
- Location: Democratic Republic of the Congo
- Type: Ship sinking
- Deaths: At least 86 (including 21 children)

On 10 June 2024, the ship HB la Saintet sank in the Kwa River, a tributary of the Congo River in the Democratic Republic of the Congo, killing at least 86 people including 21 children.

== Background ==
Due to the fact that there are few paved roads in the Congo, rivers and lakes are often used to transport goods and people. Boat overcrowding and poor safety measures on ships have long been significant problems in the Democratic Republic of the Congo. Not all passengers are able to swim and they are rarely provided with lifevests.

A ferry capsized on the Kasai River in 2010, killing between 80 and 140 people. Another overcrowded ship was overturned in Mbandaka and killed at least 52 in October 2023. More recently, a boat capsized on Lake Kivu in the eastern part of the country in January 2024, killing most of its 50 passengers.

== Events ==
On 10 June 2024 at around 23:00 CAT (UTC +2:00), an overloaded ship heading from Mushie to the town of Lebida experienced engine failure, and crashed either into the shore or into a second boat and sank in the Kasai River.

The incident occurred in Mai-Ndombe Province, about 70 km (43 mi) from Mushie. Out of 271 people on the ship, 86 died, including 21 children. Over 100 people were rescued, and according to a Mushi District commissioner, as many as 185 were able to swim to the shore.

According to one official, the boat was carrying bags of cement in addition to the passengers, and was overloaded.

President Félix Tshisekedi said that victims will receive assistance and an investigation would be conducted into the cause of the disaster.

== See also ==
- 2021 Congo River disaster
- 2024 Bangui river disaster
