= Luele River =

River in Democratic Republic of the Congo

Location
- Country: Democratic Republic of the Congo

Physical characteristics
- Mouth
  - coordinates: 3.954767°S 19.399023°E

Basin features
- River system: Kasai River

The Luele River (called the Pio-Pio or Lié River in its lower course) runs from south to north through Idiofa territory, Kwilu province, Democratic Republic of the Congo. The river starts as a clear stream in a small valley near Idiofa. It grows in size rapidly due to many small tributaries, among which is the Punkulu River, and then meanders through a large valley before entering the Kasai River downstream from Mangai.
