= Idiofa Territory =

- Territory
- Interactive map of Idiofa Territory
- Coordinates: 4.966798°S 19.591026°E
- Country: DR Congo
- Province: Kwilu Province
- Time zone: UTC+1 (WAT)
- National language: Kikongo

Idiofa Territory is an administrative area in the Kwilu Province of the Democratic Republic of the Congo (DRC). The capital is the town of Idiofa.

== Location ==
The territory has an area of 20,000 square kilometres (7,700 sq mi). The Loange River defines the eastern boundary of the territory, while the Kamtsha River flows through the west of the territory. Other rivers include the Lubue and the PioPio. All these rivers flow from south to north, emptying into the Kasai River, which defines the northern boundary.

== People ==
The territory currently has a population of 1,450,035. The many ethnic groups today include the Bunda, Pende, Dinga, Lori, Ngoli, Wongo, Yansi, Lele and Nzadi.

== Language ==
In addition to French, which is the administrative language of the city, Kikongo ya leta (also known as Kikongo) is the local language spoken by the population.

The Kikongo ya leta spoken in Idiofa is influenced by Kibunda, a dialect spoken in the surrounding area. Among young people, Lingala is also increasingly used, partly because of the influence of music and the city's proximity to Kinshasa, the capital of the Democratic Republic of the Congo.

The languages spoken in the territory are estimated to have the following proportions:

- Ngoli – 8%
- Pende – 12%
- Dinga – 25%
- Bunda – 55%
- Kikongo ya leta (also known as Kikongo) – 100%

== Administration ==
The colonial administrators originally named the territory "Babunda Territory" after the largest ethnic group, the Bunda people. The Territory was renamed the Kamtsha-Lubue Territory after the largest of the rivers. Later the territory was extended east, renamed again to the Kamtsha-Luange Territory.

The Idiofa Territory today has five cities and 12 sectors. The cities are Idiofa, Dibaya-Lubwe, Mangai, Panu, Mongombala (at Bulungu border), and Kalo (Kamtsha-Loange). The sectors are Banga, Belo, Bulwem, Kalanganda, Kanga, Kapia, Kipuku, Madimbi, Mateko, Musanga-Idiofa, Sedzo and Yasa-Lokwa.
