= Kamtsha River =

Location
- Country: Democratic Republic of the Congo

Physical characteristics
- Mouth
  - coordinates: 3.716092°S 18.929272°E

Basin features
- River system: Kasai River

The Kamtsha River (French: Rivière Kamtcha) is a tributary of the Kasai River. The river flows north through Idiofa territory of Kwilu province, Democratic Republic of the Congo to its mouth on the Kasai River.

The Kamtsha is the most important river in Idiofa Territory. It is formed by the confluence of many smaller streams and rivers that rise in the south of the territory, of which the Lokwa and Labua are the most important, taking the name of Kamtsha after their union to the west of Idiofa. At this point the river is just 20 metres (66 ft) wide, but it grows to 100 metres (330 ft) in its lower reaches, entering the Kasai at Eolo. The river meanders through a valley that is narrow at first but gradually widens and flattens until it has disappeared near the mouth of the river.

The most important tributaries are the Luana, the Lokwa and the Dule. The Luana, which runs almost parallel to the Kamtsha, is 20 metres (66 ft) near its mouth. The two rivers flow on either side of a well-populated plateau. After the Luana has joined it, the river has no more rapids and is navigable down to the Kasai.
