= 2010 Kasai River ferry capsizing =

2010 passenger ferry disaster in Bandundu province, DR Congo

- Date: July 29, 2010
- Location: Bandundu Province, Democratic Republic of the Congo
- Cause: Overloaded passenger ferry capsizing
- Deaths: At least 80

The 2010 Kasai River ferry capsizing took place on July 29, 2010, when an overloaded passenger ferry capsized on the Kasai River in the Bandundu Province, east of Kinshasa, in the Democratic Republic of the Congo. At least 80 people were confirmed to have died, with other accounts putting this figure closer to 140.

== Background ==
Owing to the country's lack of roads outside major cities, ferries and river transport are a major component of transport in the DRC. The country, which is comparable in size to the whole of Western Europe, has just a few hundred kilometres of paved roads outside the cities. The disaster occurred on the Kasai River, a tributary of the Congo River, in the western Bandundu province, east of the capital, Kinshasa. The boat was travelling to Kinshasa from the town of Mushie in Bandundu's western Plateaux district, which is 30 kilometres (19 mi) from the city of Bandundu, the capital of that province.

The government stated that boat owners in the DRC were frequently negligent and that adherence to insurance rules and maintenance schedules was often lax. Fatal riverine accidents are frequent in the DRC and are often blamed on overloading. Several decades of conflict in the region have degraded the country's infrastructure, leaving aircraft and boats as the best or only option for travel. According to Agence France-Presse, boating accidents are made more likely by the poor state of the signage in navigable channels, the lack of signal lights on vessels and the inexperience of pilots. The situation is compounded because most vessels fail to meet basic safety standards.

== Accident ==
=== Cause ===
According to the government, the boat capsized after hitting a rock. The boat was badly overloaded according to police, and many passengers were unable to swim. Police initially attributed the cause of the capsize to rough weather, although the government also said that low water levels on the river due to the dry season may have been the cause, leading to a higher chance of boats snagging or hitting submerged sandbanks.

=== Date and location ===
Conflicting accounts have been given for the date and exact location of the accident, with Information Minister Lambert Mende Omalanga stating on 29 July 2010 that it took place on Tuesday 27 July 2010 at Mangutuka river post, about 120 kilometres (75 mi) from Kinshasa; he earlier stated it took place on Wednesday, 300 kilometres (190 mi) from Kinshasa. Another account from Mende stated it occurred near Maluku district, about 130 kilometres (81 mi) from Kinshasa. Several secondary reports have said it occurred on Wednesday, 28 July.

=== Rescue efforts ===
The DRC Navy and local Red Cross personnel travelled to the scene of the accident to assist in the search for survivors and in collecting the dead.

== Fatalities ==
A provisional police death toll stated 138 people died. The Transport Ministry toll was 80 confirmed dead and 76 known survivors, although both figures were thought likely to rise with searches for survivors, and due to the presence of many unrecorded passengers on the boat. The official manifest listed "about 180 passengers" according to the government. According to one report, the boat was carrying "about 200 passengers" in all. An unnamed official in the local governor's office said that 140 people were dead. Another unnamed source stated that just two children were believed to have survived the disaster.
