= Oshwe =

- Commune
- Location in the Democratic Republic of the Congo
- Coordinates: 3.418837°S 19.433441°E
- Country: DR Congo
- Province: Mai-Ndombe
- Territory: Oshwe
- Elevation: 1,150 ft (350 m)

Population (2012)
  - Total: 22,576
- Time zone: UTC+1 (West Africa Time)

Oshwe is a community in Mai-Ndombe province, Democratic Republic of the Congo (DRC). It is the headquarters of Oshwe territory. The town lies on the Lukenie River. The estimated population as of 2012 was 22,576. The town is served by Oshwe Airport (ICAO: FZBD) at an elevation of 1,150 feet (350 m).

In September 2010 hundreds of people demonstrated against SODEFOR (Société de Développement Forestier), a subsidiary of Nordsudtimber of Liechtenstein. They were demanding a halt to industrial logging in the region, which degrades the rainforest on which the community depends without bringing benefits to the impoverished community.

In 2012, the Oshwe radio station converted to more reliable solar power and increased its antenna height, allowing it to broadcast information to other villages within a 100 kilometres (62 mi) radius.
