= Sodefor =

Nordsudtimber's forest development subsidiary

- Founded: 1994
- Headquarters: Kinshasa, Democratic Republic of the Congo
- Products: Forestry
- Owner: Nordsudtimber
- Website: www.sodefor.net

Sodefor (Société de Développement Forestier, or Forest Development Corporation) is a subsidiary of Nordsudtimber of Liechtenstein that undertakes logging operations in the Democratic Republic of the Congo. There has been controversy about the impact of the company on the environment and the local communities,

== Assets and operations ==
Sodefor was founded in 1994 and acquired assets in Bandundu formerly owned by Forescom, a nationalized company that was suspended in 1990. These included a sawmill and plywood factory in Nioki and a forestry concession area of more than 1,700,000 hectares (4,200,000 acres). Due to the First Congo War (1996-7) and Second Congo War (1998-2003), operations were initially very limited, with the Nioki plant closed completely in 1998/1999. Since 2004 the company has been undertaking a major expansion program. The main concession areas are to the north and south of Lake Mai-Ndombe and on both sides of the Lukenie River, centered on Oshwe.

== Controversy ==
In February 2010 twenty-seven people of the Bokongo community in Oshwe Territory led by Deputy Bosama Henri were arrested and charged for attacking the company and paralyzing its activities. They claimed that the company had moved the boundaries and had never paid the customary dues to the local people. In September 2010 hundreds of people in Oshwe, a community in the Mai-Ndombe District of Bandundu Province, demonstrated against SODEFOR. They were demanding a halt to industrial logging in the region, which degrades the rainforest on which the community depends without bringing benefits to the impoverished community. In February 2011 the people of Batito-sud in Oshwe territory addressed a memo to the Minister of the Environment asking for an investigation into the company's finances. They claimed Sodefor had done nothing to develop the community. Roads had not been maintained and no longer existed. They asked for compensation of $1.5 million for abusive forest exploitation in the Isiko location in 2004.
