= Idiofa Airport =

- IATA: IDF; ICAO: FZCB

Summary
- Airport type: Public
- Location: Idiofa, Democratic Republic of the Congo
- Elevation AMSL: 2,299 ft / 701 m
- Coordinates: 4°58′15″S 19°34′50″E

Map
- Location within DRC

Runways
Direction	Length		Surface
Direction	m	ft	Surface
08/26	1,200	3,937	Gravel
- Sources: GCM Google Maps

Idiofa Airport (IATA: IDF, ICAO: FZCB) is an airport serving Idiofa, a city in Kwilu Province, Democratic Republic of the Congo.

== See also ==
- Transport in the Democratic Republic of the Congo
- List of airports in the Democratic Republic of the Congo
