= Mushie Airport =

- IATA: none; ICAO: FZBJ

Summary
- Airport type: Public
- Serves: Mushie
- Elevation AMSL: 1,214 ft / 370 m
- Coordinates: 3°00′30″S 16°55′35″E

Map
- Location of the airport in Democratic Republic of the Congo

Runways
Direction	Length		Surface
Direction	ft	m	Surface
17/35	3,510	1,070	Grass
- Sources: Google Maps GCM

Mushie Airport (ICAO: FZBJ) is an airport serving the town of Mushie in Democratic Republic of the Congo.

== See also ==
- Transport in the Democratic Republic of the Congo
- List of airports in the Democratic Republic of the Congo
