= Mangai =

- Location within Democratic Republic of the Congo
- Coordinates: 4.049913°S 19.533327°E
- Country: Democratic Republic of the Congo
- Province: Kwilu Province
- Territory: Idiofa Territory
- Elevation: 277 m (909 ft)

Mangai is a town in Kwilu Province, Democratic Republic of the Congo. Mangai lies on the southern bank of the Kasai River, at an altitude of 912 ft (277 m) The town is served by Mangui Airport.
