= Mushie =

- Commune
- Location in Democratic Republic of the Congo
- Coordinates: 3°1′10″S 16°54′49″E
- Country: DR Congo
- Province: Mai-Ndombe Province
- Territory: Mushie
- Time zone: UTC+1 (WAT)
- Climate: Aw
- National language: Lingala

Mushie is a town in Mai-Ndombe province, Democratic Republic of the Congo and is the administrative center of Mushie Territory. It lies at an elevation of 1118 ft (340 m), on the northern bank of the Kasai River at its confluence with the Fimi River. Mushie's population is roughly 33,000. Mushie was the birthplace of the celebrated Congolese musician Papa Wendo. The town is served by Mushie Airport.

== History ==
The town was the capital of the old polity Mwene Muji.

On 12 June 2024, a ship crashed around 70 kilometres (43 mi) from Mushie on the Kwa River, killing 86 people.
