= Niangara Bridge =

Bridge in Democratic Republic of the Congo

Coordinates: 3.696620°N 27.895386°E

The Niangara Bridge is a bridge crossing on the Uele River, a tributary to the Congo River, in north-eastern DR Congo in Central Africa.

The city of Niangara, in the province of Upper Uele, is situated on the southern shore of the Uele River, and the bridge provides a connection to the hinterland of the northern river shore and international connections to South Sudan and Central African Republic, which lies north and north-east of Niangara.
