= Idiofa =

- Commune
- Location within Democratic Republic of the Congo
- Coordinates: 4.966798°S 19.591026°E
- Country: DR Congo
- Province: Kwilu
- Territory: Idiofa
- Elevation: 554 m (1,818 ft)

Population (2012)
  - Total: 61,056
- Climate: Aw
- National language: Kikongo

Idiofa is a town in Kwilu Province of the Democratic Republic of the Congo.

== Location ==
Idiofa is the administrative center for Idiofa Territory. Idiofa lies at an altitude of 1820 ft (554 m), east of the larger city of Kikwit, and west of the Lubue River. Idiofa is served by the small Idiofa Airport (IATA Code: IDF). The town is part of the Roman Catholic Diocese of Idiofa.

30 km from Idiofa is the settlement of Banga Banga which was an important local centre in Belgian Congo days with a European presence and a palm oil press.

== People ==
As of 2012 the population was estimated to be 61,056. The Bunda people form the majority of the population of the town. Idiofa is known as the place where President Mobutu Sese Seko's mother, Mama Yemo, died during an emergency landing at the local airport.
