= Mount Mangengenge =

Mountain in Democratic Republic of the Congo

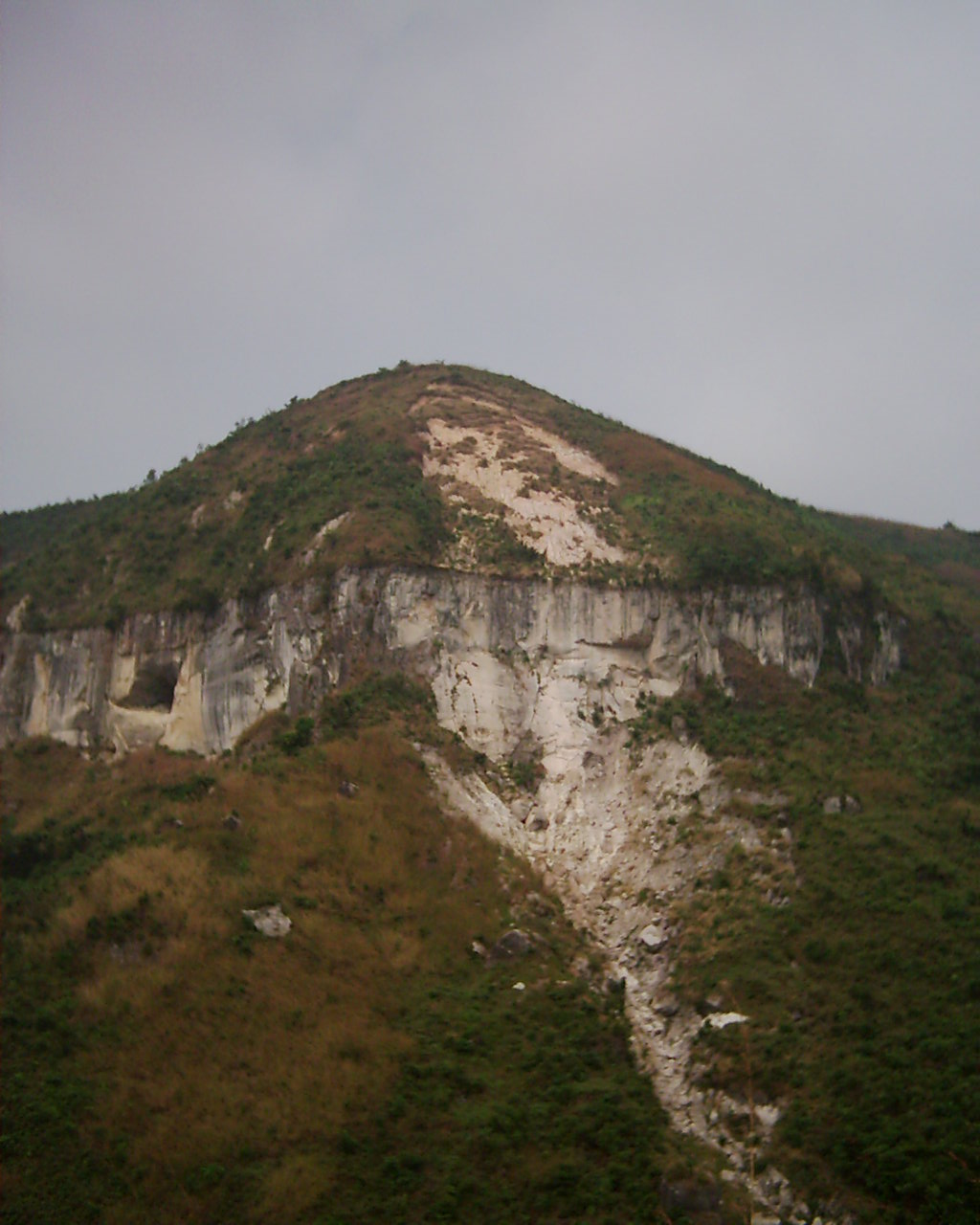
- Mount Mangengenge

Highest point
- Elevation: 718 m (2,356 ft)
- Coordinates: 4°26′15″S 15°31′26″E

Geography
- Location within Democratic Republic of the Congo
- Country: Democratic Republic of the Congo
- Province: Kinshasa
- Parent range: Crystal Mountains

Climbing
- First ascent: June 1885 by Carl Anton Mense

Mount Mangengenge is a mountain of the Democratic Republic of the Congo located southeast of Kinshasa, about ten kilometers south of the Ndjili International Airport. It is part of the Crystal Mountains range. The mountain can be reached from the outskirts of the parish of Sainte Angèle de Mérici, along a track hardly passable.

== Toponymy ==
The name Mangengenge derives from the Lingala word kongenge, which means "shining". The mountain was first called Mabangu or Manguele.

== History ==
In June 1885, the medical doctor Carl Anton Mense (1861–1938) was the first European to climb the mountain. To remember this historical ascent, the mountain was called "pic Mense" for almost a century.

== Geography ==
Overlooking the plain of the Pool Malebo, it reaches an altitude of 718 metres (2,356 ft), which makes it the highest point in Kinshasa.

== Religion ==
The path of the ascent is punctuated with crucifix sculptures with a large cross at the summit. This is because the Bishop of Kinshasa, Frederic Etsou Nzabi Bamungwabi took the initiative in 1992 to make it a spiritual place. Since then, thousands and thousands of pilgrims have climbed the peak.

== Tourism ==
The mountain is the highest point in Kinshasa and is a natural landmark and tourist attraction.

== World Cleanup Day ==
A couple of participants of the World Cleanup Day collected garbage left by pilgrims and tourists for the first time in September 2019. Their aim is to keep doing it two or three times a year. They hope that other tourists and pilgrims will start doing it as well.

== Gallery ==
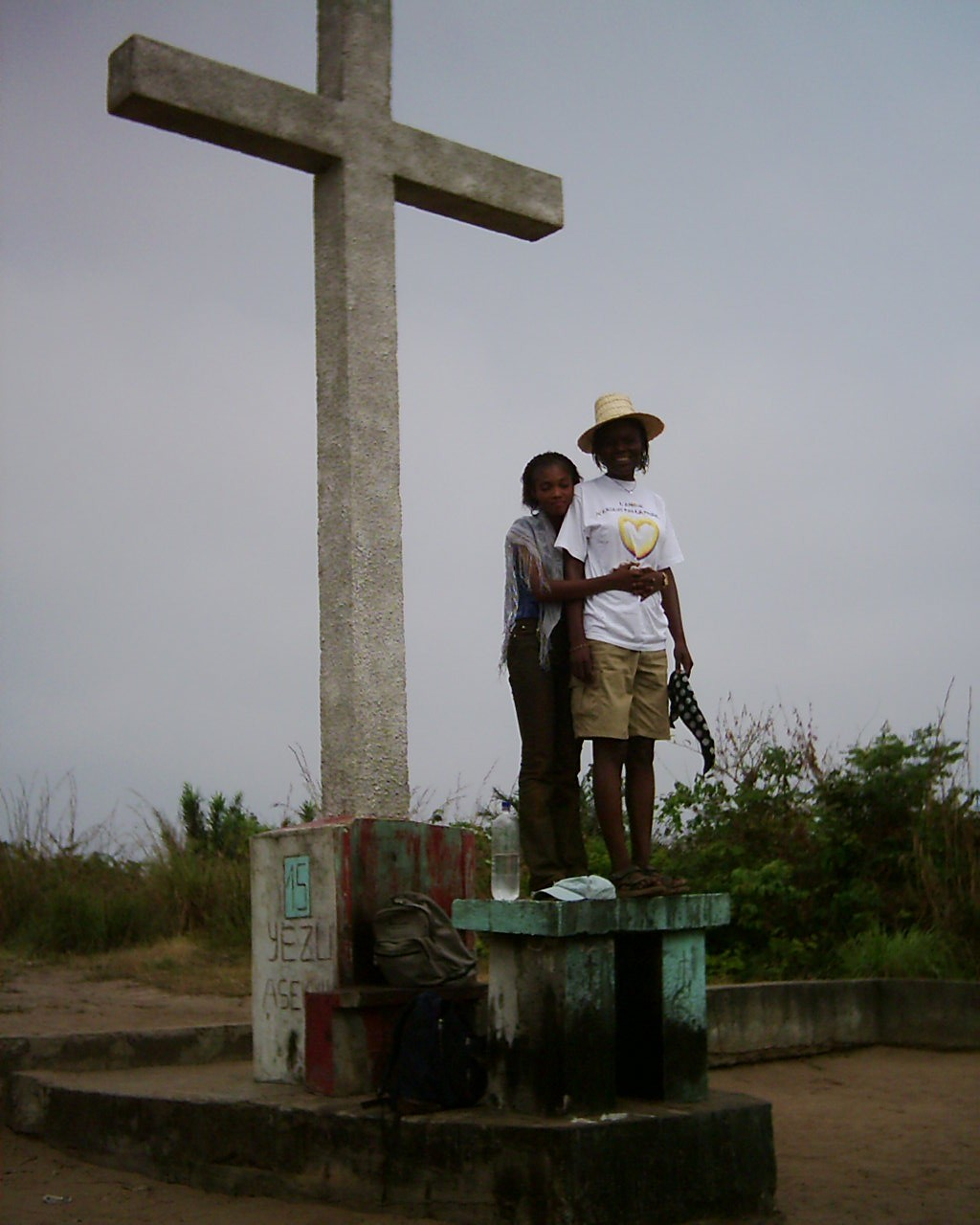
The cross at the summit of Mount Mangengenge

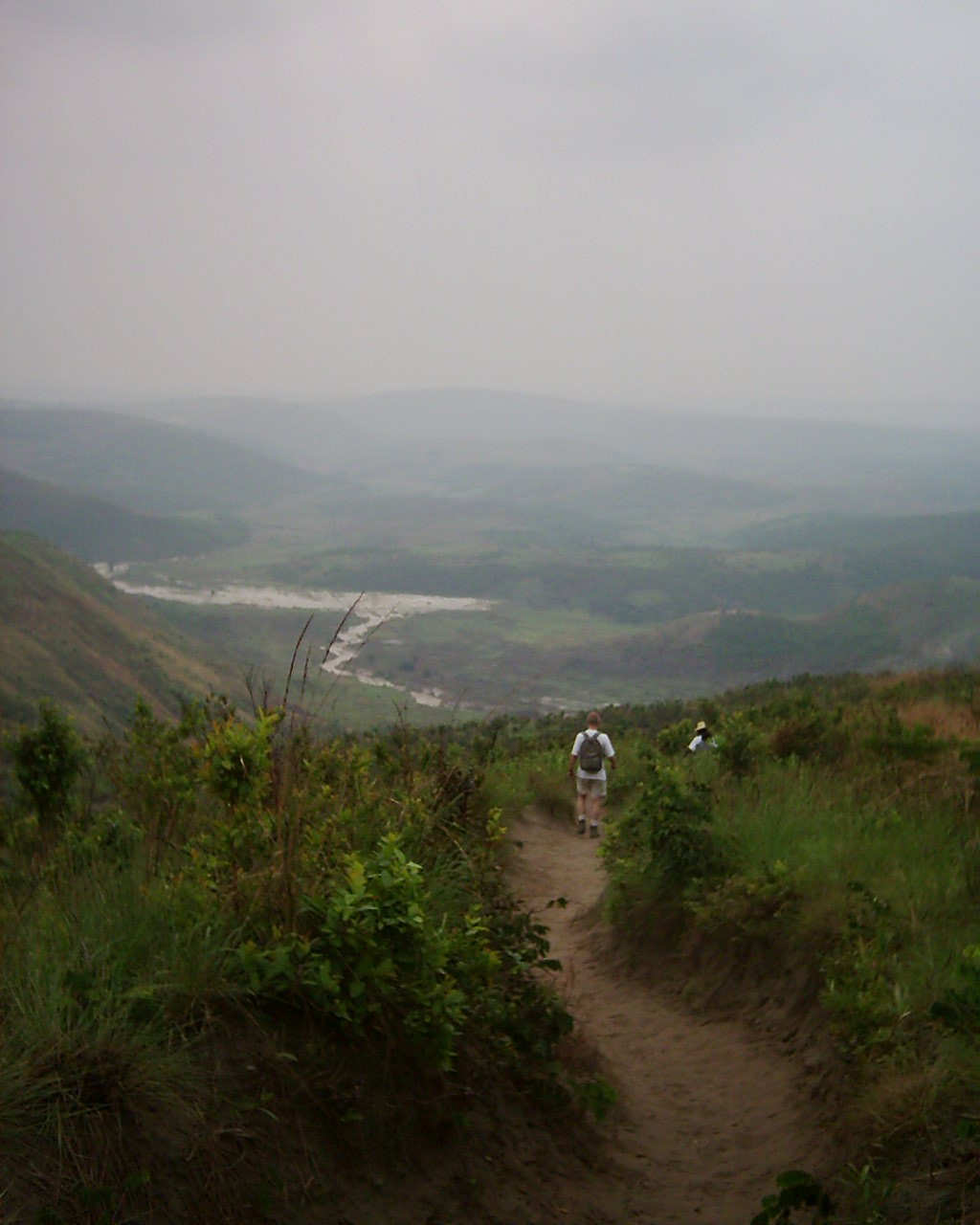
Descent over the Malebo Pool plains
