= Lukenie River =

River in Democratic Republic of the Congo

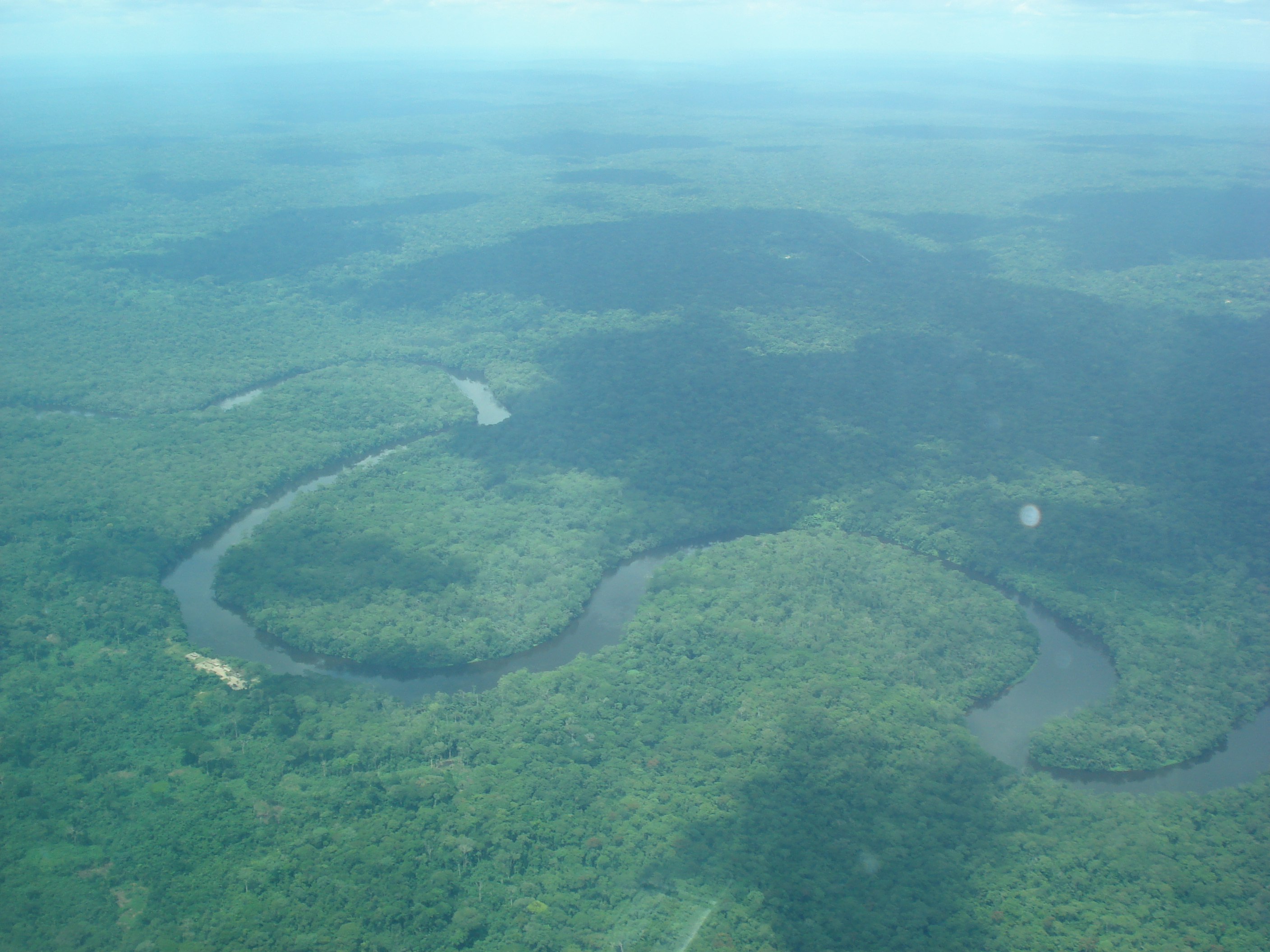
Aerial view of the Lukenie River as it meanders through the Central Congolian lowland forests of the DRC

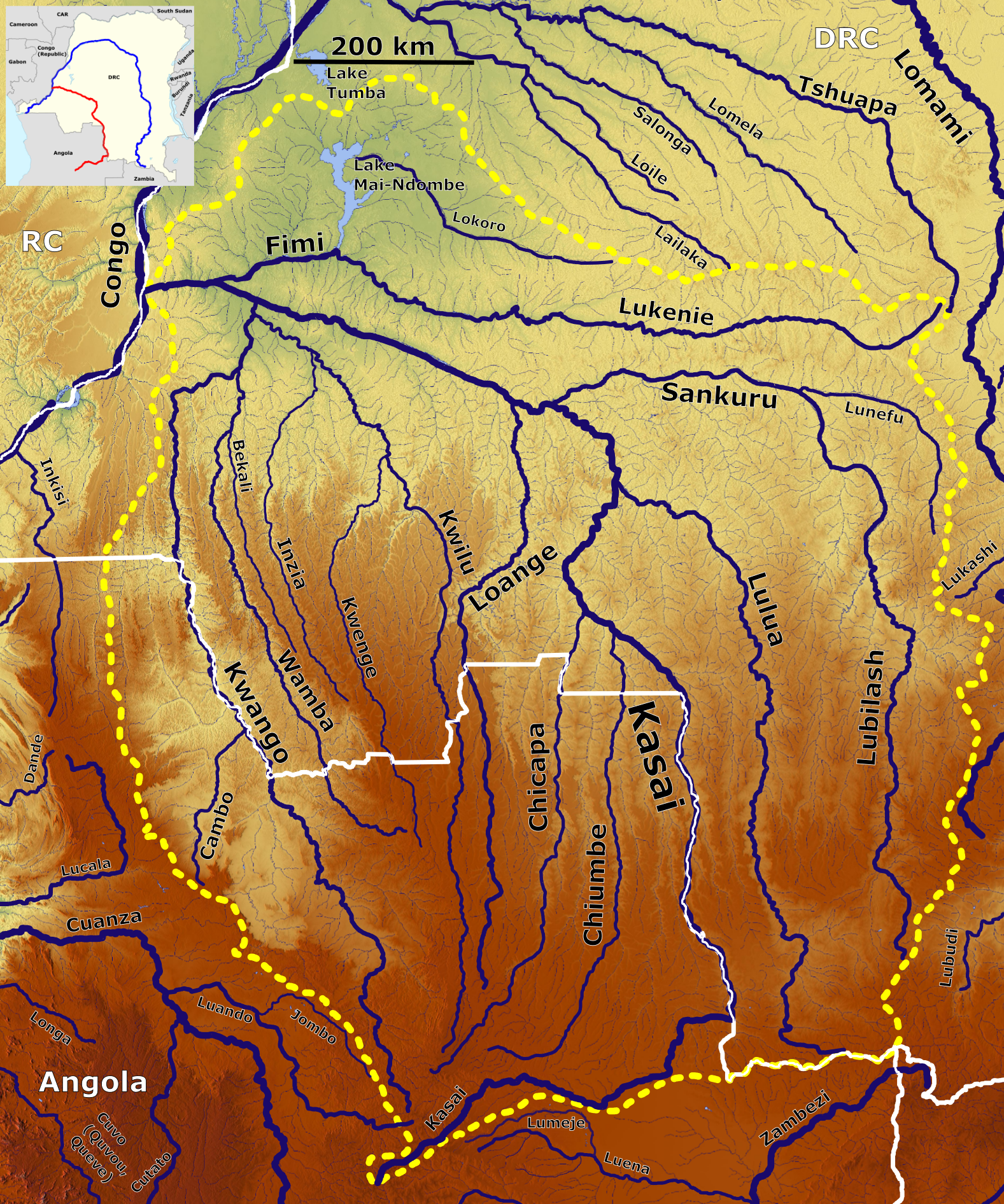
The Lukenie River in the Kasai catchment (at the top)

The Lukenie River (French: Rivière Lukenie) is a river in the central Congo Basin of the Democratic Republic of the Congo (DRC).

River barges from Kinshasa journey up the Congo, Kwah (Kasai), and Fimi Rivers to the Lukenie as far as the landing at Kole, a journey of 6 to 12 weeks. This is not done during the low water season (June–August), however, for fear of stranding for long periods. The Lukenie is not navigable by barges above Kole.

During the early Belgian colonial era, the river was sometimes used to transport rubber from posts such as Kole and Lodja down to Lake Leopold II. However, most supplies were brought overland from Bene Dibele, to the south on the right bank of the Sankuru River just below the point where it is joined by the Lubefu River, a more reliable route.

Some of the main logging concession areas of Sodefor are on both sides of the Lukenie River, centered on Oshwe. In September 2010 hundreds of people in Oshwe, a community in Mai-Ndombe Province, demonstrated against SODEFOR. They were demanding a halt to industrial logging in the region, which degrades the rainforest on which the community depends without bringing benefits to the impoverished community.
