= Lulua River =

River in the Congo basin in Africa

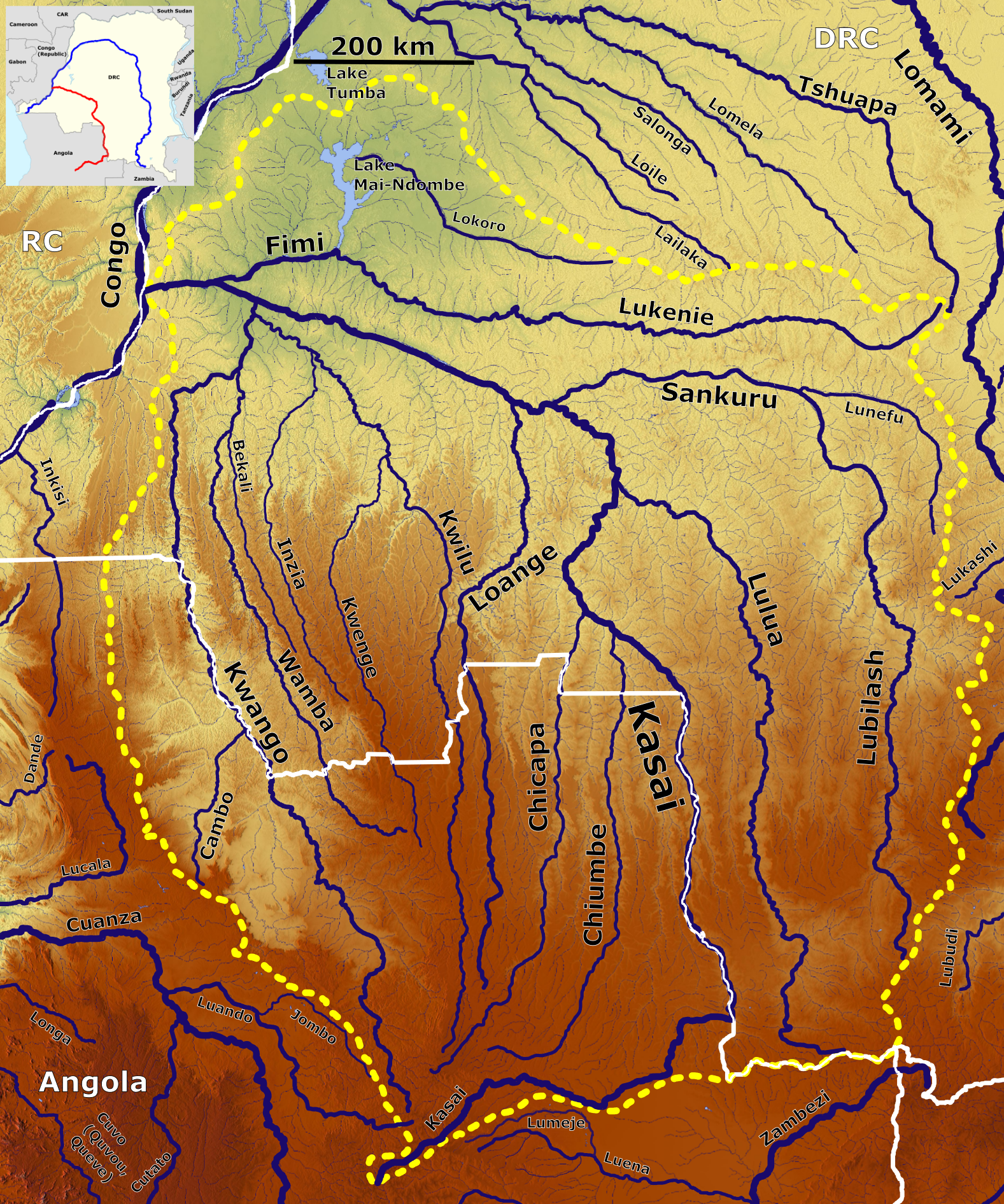
The Lulua River in the Kasai catchment (center right)

Lulua River (French: Rivière Lulua; Dutch: Lulua Rivier) is a river in the Congo Basin in Africa situated in the Democratic Republic of Congo. It is a right tributary of the Kasai River.
