= Lubue River =

River in Democratic Republic of the Congo

Location
- Country: Democratic Republic of the Congo

Physical characteristics
- Mouth
  - coordinates: 4.1714°S 19.8792°E

Basin features
- River system: Kasai River

The Lubue River runs from south to north through Idiofa territory, Kwilu province, Democratic Republic of the Congo. Near its origin in the south, where the Musanga River enters from the left, it is a small, winding river perhaps 12 metres (39 ft) wide obstructed by rocks and rapids. It becomes navigable at Mulasa, and below this point meanders through a very wide and wooded valley. It enters the Kasai near the town of Dibaya Lubue.
