= Fimi River =

River in Democratic Republic of the Congo

Lake Mai-Ndombe and the Fimi River, in red

The Fimi River (French: Rivière Fimi) is a river in the Democratic Republic of the Congo. It flows from Lake Mai-Ndombe to the Kasai River, which in turn empties into the Congo. One of the Fimi's tributaries is the Lukenie River, which is navigable by barges as far as Kole.
