= Loange River =

River in Angola and the Democratic Republic of the Congo

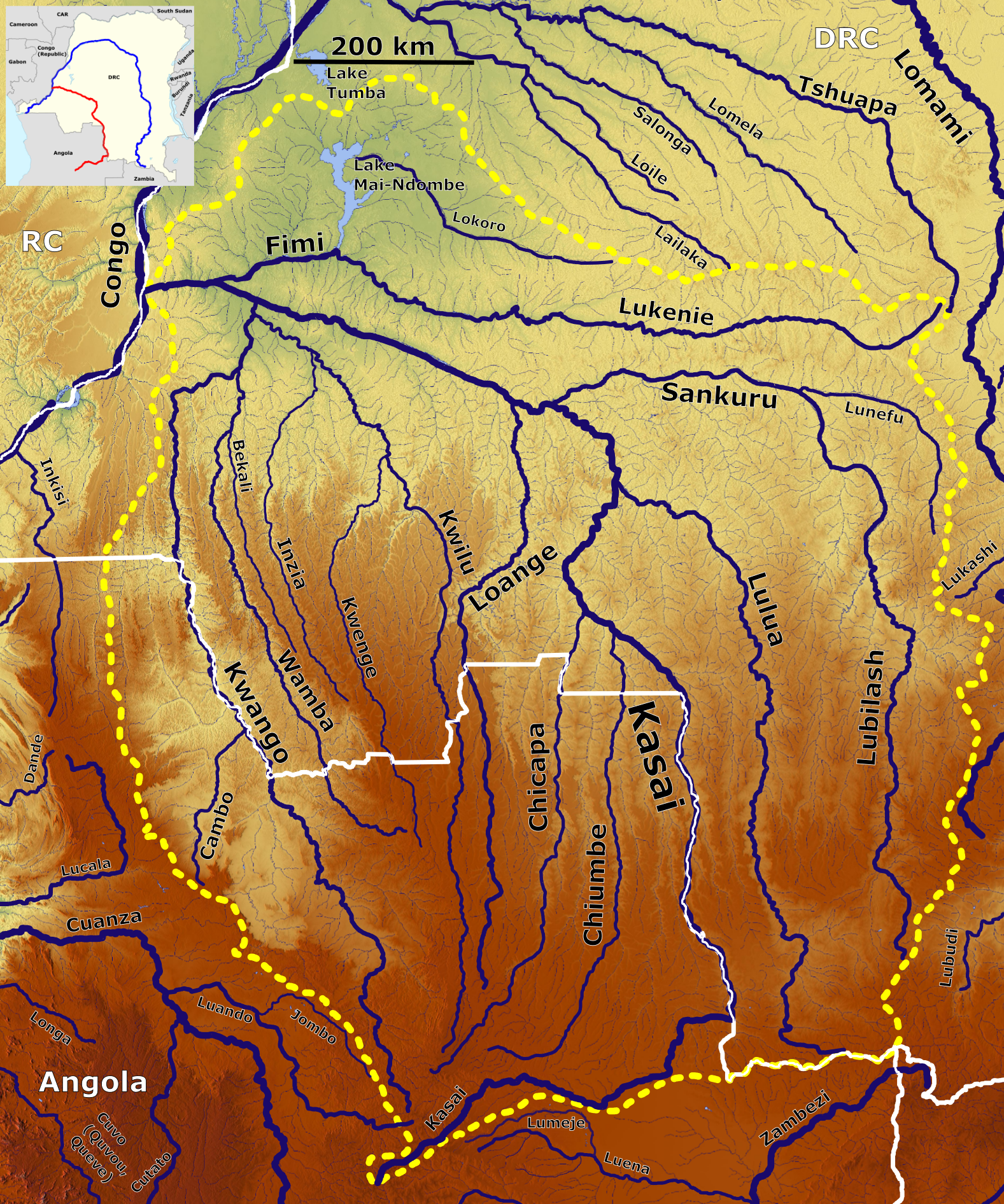
- The Loange in the Kasai River catchment (center)

Location
- Countries: Angola; Democratic Republic of the Congo

Physical characteristics
- Mouth
  - coordinates: 4.293091°S 20.027819°E

Basin features
- River system: Kasai River

The Loange River (or Luangué, Luange, Lwange) is a tributary of the Kasai River. Originating in Angola, the river flows north into the Democratic Republic of the Congo, through the eastern part of Kwango. The river then continues north along the boundary between Kwilu and Kasai provinces to its mouth on the Kasai.

== History ==
At the start of the twentieth century, the Loange was inhabited by the Bakongo people, who were described as initially suspicious and hostile to white men by ethnographer Melville William Hilton-Simpson, who led the first documented exploration of the river by non-Africans and was eventually able to peaceably interact with and learn about them over the course of two years.

In the mid-twentieth century, the Loange was navigable up to the town of Kalema near the confluence with the Tobi River. The Compagnie du Kasai, which operated steamboats and barges in the river, cleared snags all the way up to Lake Matshi, which is 80 km downstream from Ilebo.

Today, the DRC's National Road 1 crosses the river at Kalema to connect Kikwit and Kinshasa with Kamina and Lubumbashi. There is no longer any significant river transport on the Loange.

== Landscape ==
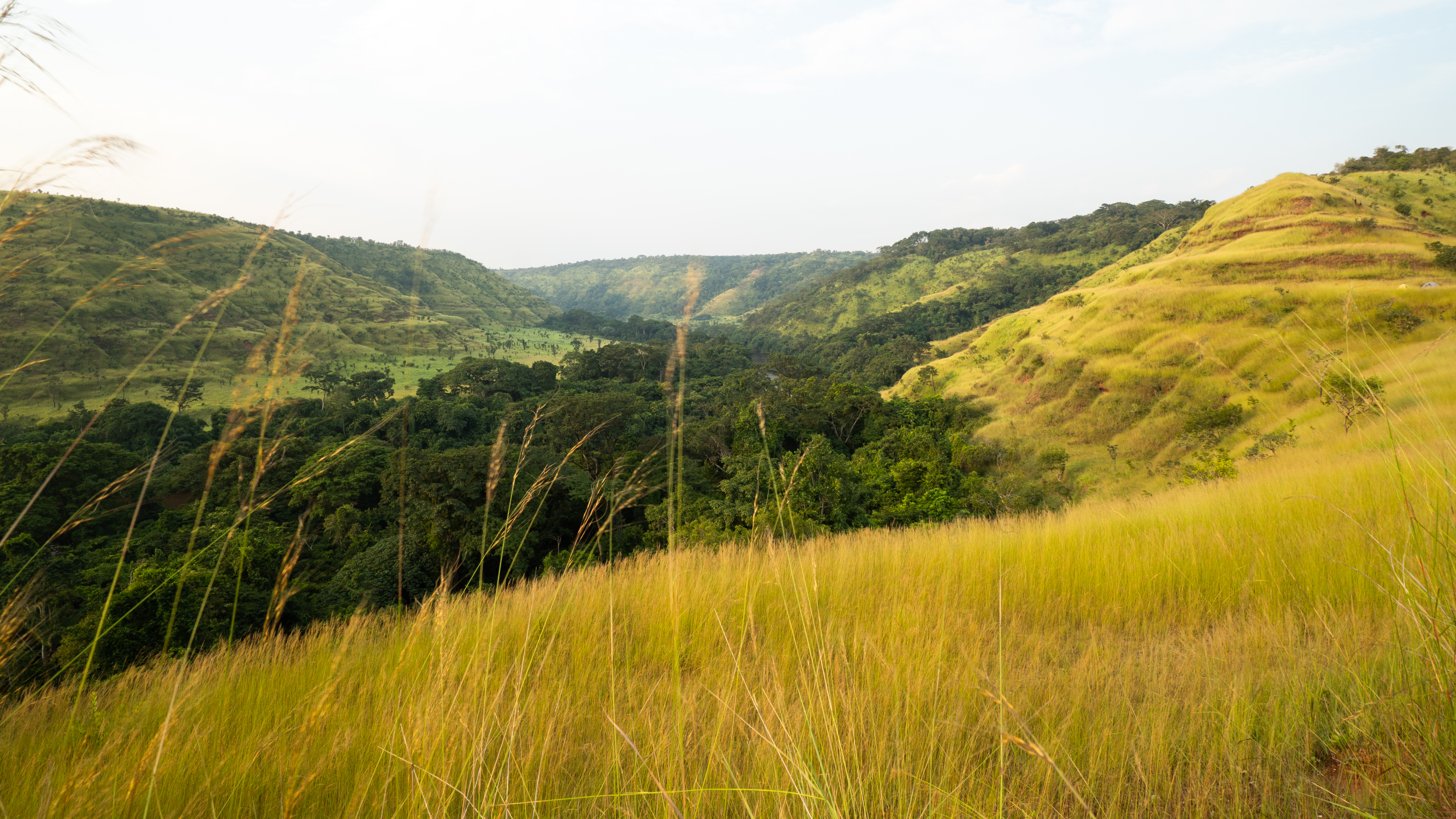
Loange River valley in March

In the triple border area of Kwilu, Kwango and Kasai, the Loange river forms a terraced landscape in the loamy soil. The river is full of sandbars, which are especially prominent in the dry season, at which point the river is lowered by as much as 1.5 meters in depth compared to the wet season.

In 1898, the Loange was described by a steamer crewman:

The Loange is a beautiful river with deep grounds. The waters are reddish, and the average width is between 200 and 250m, with pools going to a width of 500 and 600m. The alternating riffles and pools produce wild waters, shaking our little steamer Katanga like a walnut shell. For small steamers, at high water, these violent, whirling eddies are frightful. At night, when all else is calm, one can imagine being at the seaside.

— Hydrography and Navigation on the Congo River: A Century of Visual History

== See also ==
- Luangue
