= Kasai River =

Tributary of the Congo River; part of the DR Congo-Angola border

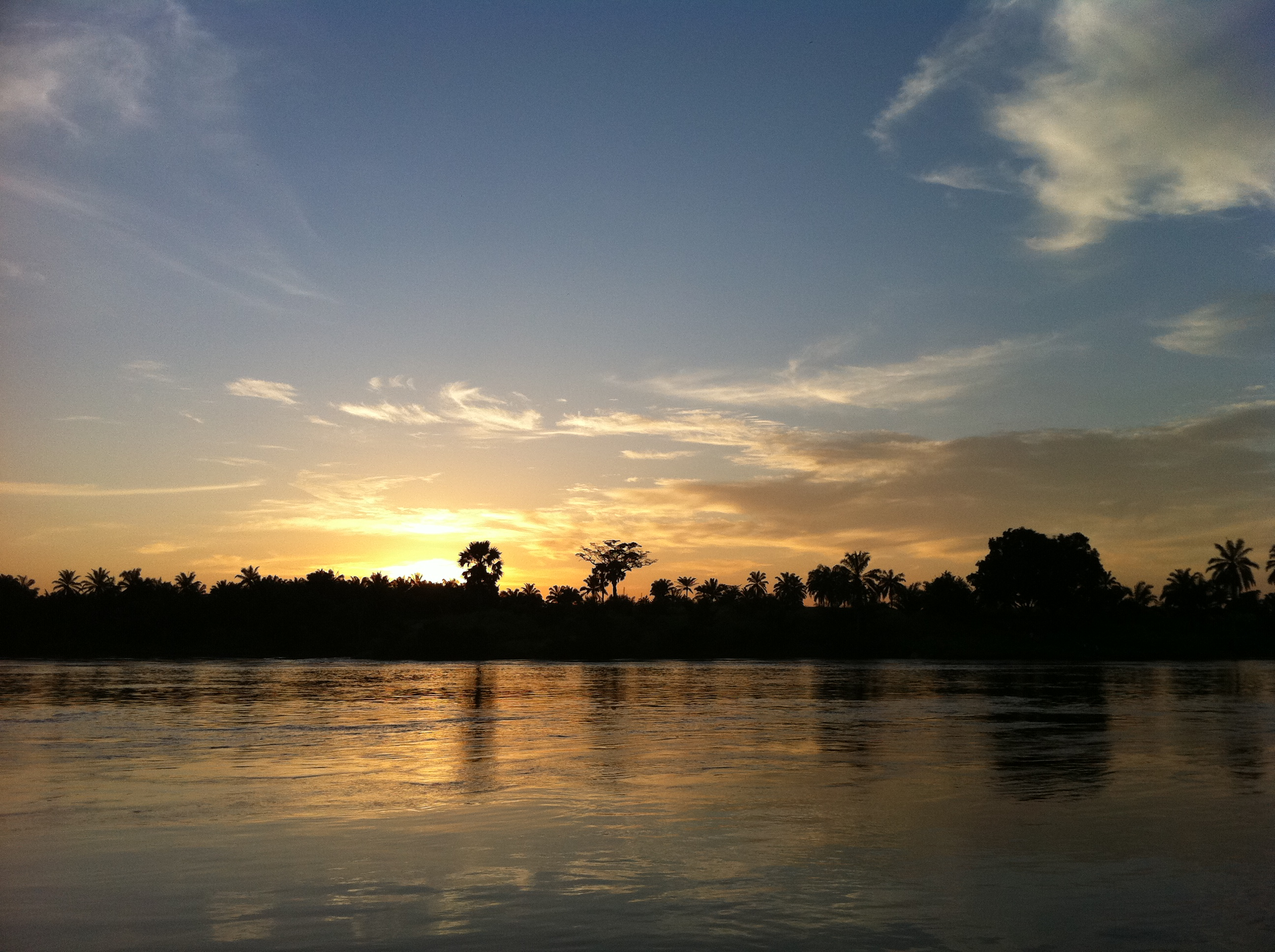

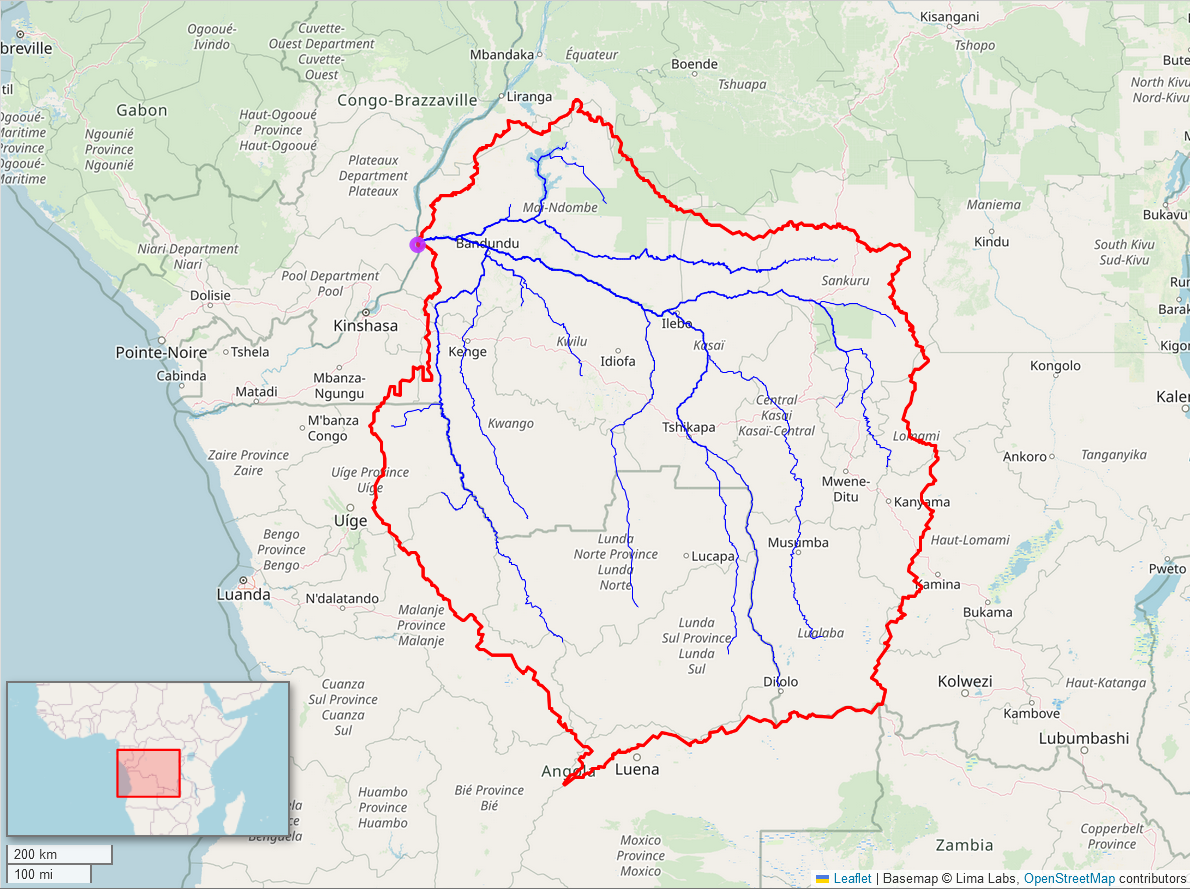
- Kasai River watershed (Interactive map)

Location
- Countries: Angola; Democratic Republic of the Congo

Physical characteristics
- Source
  - location: Bié Plateau
  - coordinates: 11.583°S 19.024°E
  - elevation: 1,300 m (4,300 ft)
- Mouth: Congo River
  - location: Kwamouth, DRC
  - coordinates: 3.182°S 16.184°E
  - elevation: 272 m (892 ft)
- Length: 2,272 km (1,412 mi)
- Basin size: 884,376 km^{2} (341,459 mi^{2})
- Discharge
  - location: Lediba
  - average: (Period: 1922–2014)10,457 m^{3}/s (330.0 km^{3}/a)
- Discharge
  - location: Kutu-Moke
  - average: (Period: 1948–2012)8,070 m^{3}/s (285,000 cu ft/s)
- Discharge
  - location: Ilebo
  - average: (1950–1959)2,240 m^{3}/s (79,000 cu ft/s)

Basin features
- Progression: Kasai → Congo → Atlantic Ocean
- River system: Congo River
- Tributaries
  - left: Luembe, Longatshimo, Tshikapa, Lovua, Loange, Lubue, Piopio, Kamtsha, Kwango, Buma
  - right: Munyango, Luau, Kasangeshi, Lueta, Lulua, Lutshuadi, Sankuru, Fimi

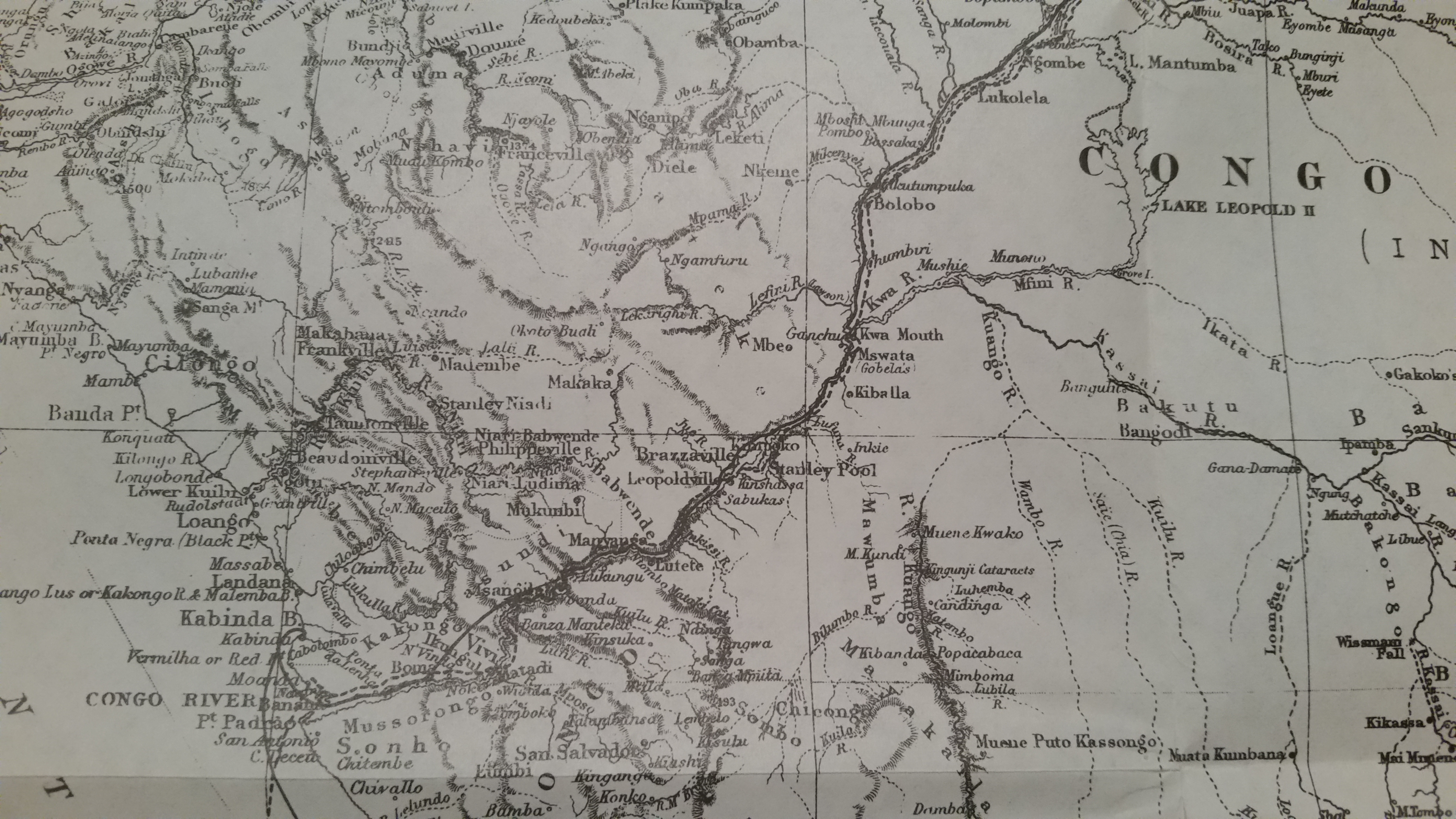
Stanley's route is depicted by the solid black line.

The Kasai River (Swahili: Mto Kasai, French: Kasaï [ka.sa.i]; called Cassai in Angolan Portuguese) is a left bank tributary of the Congo River, located in Central Africa. The river begins in central Angola and flows to the east until it reaches the border between Angola and the Democratic Republic of the Congo, where it turns north and serves as the border until it flows into the DRC. From Ilebo, between the confluences with Lulua river and Sankuru river, the Kasai river turns to a westerly direction. The lower stretch of the river, from the confluence with Fimi river until it joins the Congo at Kwamouth northeast of Kinshasa, is also known as the Kwa(h) River.

The Kasai basin consists mainly of equatorial rainforest areas, which provide an agricultural land in a region noted for its infertile, sandy soil. It is a tributary of Congo river and diamonds are found in it. Around 60% of diamonds in Belgium go from Kasai river for cutting and shaping.

== Discharge ==
Kasai River multiannual average discharge at Lediba gauging station
Period	Average discharge (m^{3}/s)
2012–2016	9,000
1948–2012	10,457
1950–1959	11,318

Kasai River multiannual average discharge at Kutu-Moke gauging station
Period	Average discharge (m^{3}/s)
1948–2012	8,070
1950–1959	8,790

Kasai River multiannual average discharge at Ilebo gauging station
Period	Average discharge (m^{3}/s)
1948–2012	2,079
1950–1959	2,240

Water discharge of the Kasai River at the Lediba (3°3′25.4556″S 16°32′55.0644″E) and Kutu-Moke (3°12′33.0516″S 17°20′42.4032″E) gauging station.
Year	Lediba	Kutu- Moke
Year	Average discharge (m³/s)	
2016	9,350	
2015	8,090	
2014	9,040	
2013	9,520	
2012	8,870	6,800
2011	7,940	6,093
2010	7,320	5,614
2009	8,820	6,764
2008	10,400	7,976
2007	13,180	10,110
2006	10,740	8,236
2005	9,017	6,917
2004	8,130	6,235
2003	11,520	8,837
2002	11,150	8,552
2001	9,290	7,125
2000	8,310	6,496
1999	7,030	5,463
1998	7,010	5,480
1997	9,800	7,659
1996	8,950	7,000
1995	7,620	5,960
1994	7,430	5,810
1993	8,580	6,705
1992	7,790	6,089
1991	10,410	8,136
1990	11,150	8,717
1989	12,810	9,988
1988	11,450	8,953
1987	11,120	8,694
1986	9,980	7,804
1985	9,550	7,463
1984	8,800	6,879
1983	10,340	8,084
1982	10,100	7,897
1981	9,500	7,427
1980	9,230	7,213
1979	11,710	9,153
1978	10,730	8,385
1977	12,450	9,731
1976	11,760	9,194
1975	10,720	8,383
1974	10,080	7,878
1973	9,970	7,796
1972	10,540	8,236
1971	11,360	8,880
1970	12,040	9,232
1969	13,020	9,986
1968	13,100	10,050
1967	11,510	8,832
1966	12,340	9,466
1965	10,970	8,417
1964	11,950	9,167
1963	11,960	9,173
1962	13,510	10,360
1961	12,440	9,543
1960	11,430	8,764
1959	9,960	7,638
1958	9,850	7,552
1957	11,810	9,060
1956	11,580	8,882
1955	11,360	8,717
1954	11,390	8,735
1953	10,220	7,837
1952	10,490	8,646
1951	11,260	8,640
1950	11,240	8,619
1949	11,560	8,870
1948	11,360	8,716
Notes: Average minimum and maximum discharge: Lediba 5,000–20,000 m³/s (1932–1959), Kutu-Moke 4,400–11,600 m³/s (1932–1959)

== Exploration ==
Henry Morton Stanley reached the confluence on 9 March 1877, calling the river Nkutu, a "powerful and deep river", but recognizing it as originating from David Livingstone's Kwango.

== Tributaries ==
The Kasai's main tributaries upstream from the confluence with the Congo:

- Fimi (right – Fimi with Lukenie 1,120 km)
- Kwilu–Kwango (left – 1,702 km)
- Loange (left – 865 km)
- Sankuru (right – Sankuru–Lubilanji 1,280 km)
- Lulua (right – 1,184 km)
- Tshikapa (left – 630 km)
- Longatshimo (left – 550 km)
- Luembe (left – 780 km)
- Lueta (right – 395 km)

The main tributaries from the mouth:
Left tributary	Right tributary	Length (km)	Basin size (km^{2})	Average discharge (m^{3}/s)*
Kwa–Kasai		2,272	894,486.6	10,457.3
Kwa
	Mbala	57.5	1,100.1	14.9
	Fimi ¹	1,120	136,174.7	2,252.9
Lower Kasai
Lekulu		57.5	793.5	9.3
Buma		138	3,354.7	42.3
Kwango		1,702	270,904.3	3,317.4
Kamtsha		250	8,887.4	106.4
Piopio		165	3,169.1	34.8
	Liau		1,231.6	14.4
Lubue		227	8,611.7	103.5
Loange		865	41,799.5	489.1
Middle Kasai
Lumbudji		137	2,876.8	25.4
Lubudi		153	1,999.2	17
	Sankuru ²	1,280	149,479.5	1,738.1
	Lutshuadi	177	4,596.5	39.2
	Lulua	1,184	70,612.5	798
Upper Kasai
Yeye		47	1,379.3	8.9
	Kabambaie	77	2,083.7	10.8
Lovua		297	8,262.4	73.9
Tshikapa		630	19,512.1	179.5
Longatshimo		550	19,847.3	198.5
	Luenda	69	1,791.4	10.1
Luembe		780	46,648.8	453.4
	Lueta (Kaungej)	395	13,000.1	87.6
	Kasangeshi	206	3,610.2	22.1
	Luele		1,173.3	7.9
	Dembo	87	1,924.8	13.1
	Luau	105	4,294.4	38.5
Lualo			1,532.8	14.6
	Lutshima	166	1,616.6	11.5
	Munyango		3,133.1	20.9
Notes:^{*} Period: 1948–2012; ¹ Fimi–Lukenie; ² Sankuru–Lubulanji;

== Economic importance ==
The tributaries of River Kasai are clear of obstacles like cataracts and river weed, making them very navigable. They facilitate the transport sector and form an important trade artery. The river's role in transport and trade was more prominent during the pre-colonial period when the slave trade was legal. Slave traders used one of its major tributaries, the Kwango River, to navigate the equatorial rain forest, capture slaves and find their way back to the Atlantic Ocean where they had docked their ships. It is greatly controversial that some of the local kingdoms that were along the Kasai River supported the slave trade. The Rund kingdom for instance, readily provided slaves for the most notorious slave traders like John Matthews, a renowned British slave vendor. These activities, though they occurred between the 18th and 19th centuries, left a lasting impact in the regions where they were most prominent, such as between the Kwango and the Kwilu rivers. The population has never recovered fully, with the population density lower than that of areas that did not experience the slave trade. The most probable trigger to British and Portuguese great interests in the Kasai River was the presence of alluvial diamonds lying in rich deposit beds, especially at the river's mouth. More deposits lie along the beds of a major tributary, the Kwango River. In fact, it is common to hear the phrase “the diamond heartland of North Eastern Angola” used in reference to the Kwango River valley. This is because the diamond alluvial beds found in this region are the richest in Angola.

== See also ==
- 2010 Kasai River disaster
- 2024 Kasai River disaster
