= Kwango District =

- District
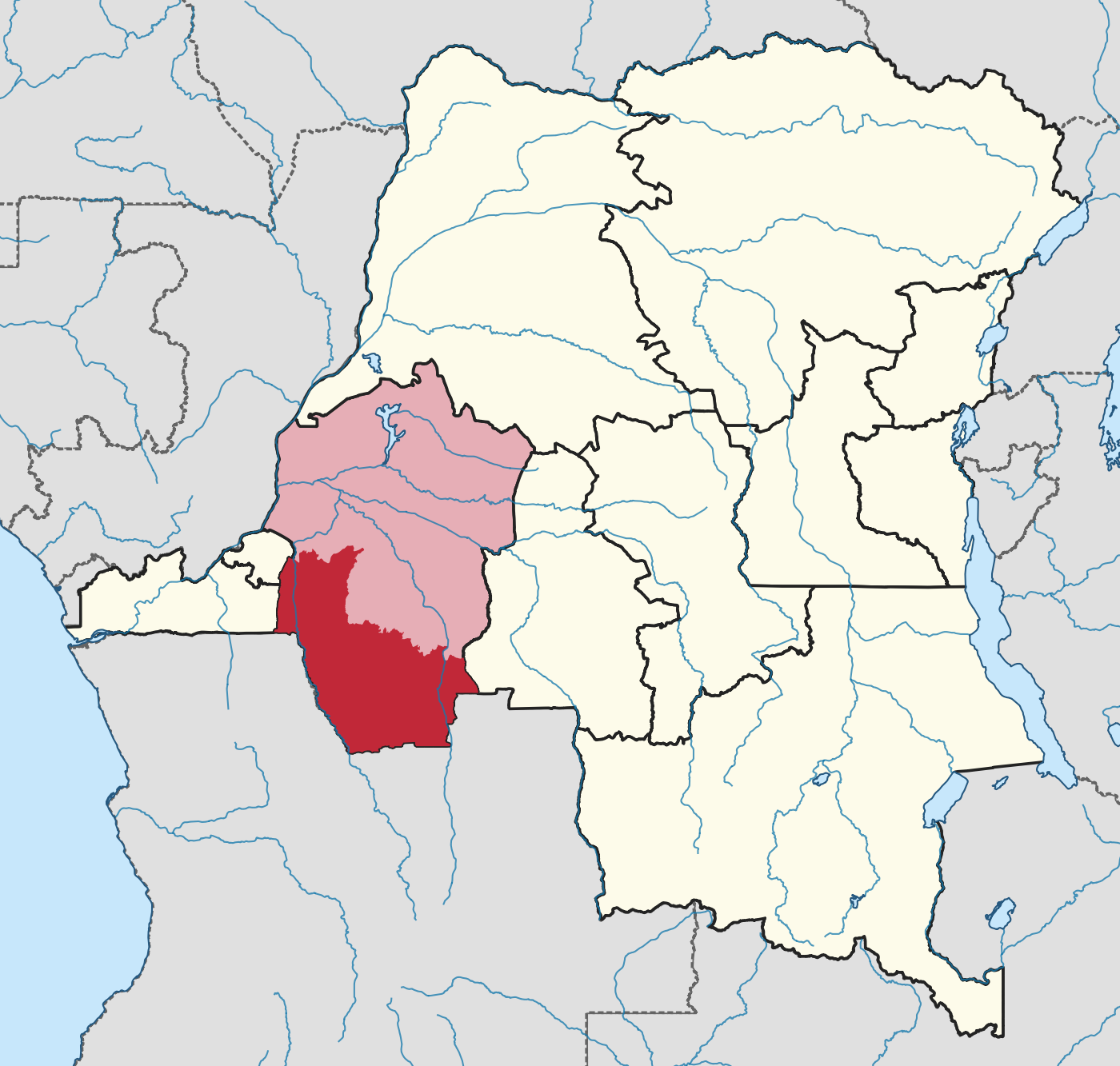
- Kwango district of Bandundu province (2014)
- Coordinates: 5.299°S 16.425°E
- Country: Democratic Republic of the Congo
- Province: Bandundu
- District: Kwango

Kwango District (French: District du Kwango, Dutch: District Kwango) was a district of the Congo Free State, Belgian Congo and the Democratic Republic of the Congo. It went through various changes in extent. It roughly corresponded to the present provinces of Kwilu and Kwango.

== Congo Free State ==
In 1895 the number of the districts in the Congo Free State was increased to fifteen. The districts now included Kwango District. It had been carved out of the west of the Kasai District. A map of the Congo Free State in 1897 shows the Kwango Oriental district bounded by the Stanley Pool District to the west, the Lualaba Kassai District to the east, and Portuguese possessions (Angola) to the south. The district extended south from the point where the combined Kwango and Kwilu rivers entered the Kasai River, and included the watershed of the Wamba River. The Kwango River formed the border with the Portuguese territory to the west, and the eastern boundary was to the east of the Kwilu River.

== Belgian Congo ==
The Congo Free State was annexed by Belgium in 1908 as the Belgian Congo. Kwango is shown with slightly different boundaries in maps of 1910, 1912, 1926 and 1933. In 1910 Kwango bordered Bas-Congo to the west, Moyen-Congo to the northwest, Lac Léopold II to the northeast and Kasai to the east.

Congo-Kasai formally became a vice-government in 1919. It contained the districts of Bas-Congo, Léopoldville, Kwango, Kasai and Sankuru. With the 1933 reorganization Bas-Congo, Léopoldville, Kwango and Lac Léopold II were included in the Léopoldville Province. A map from 1955-1957 showed a much smaller Kwango District after the northern part had been made into the Kwilu District. Kwango was now bordered by the Portuguese territories to the south, Cataractes District to the west, Kwilu District to the north and Kasai District to the east. The area was 93,300 square kilometres (36,000 sq mi) out of a total of 357,700 square kilometres (138,100 sq mi) for Léopoldville province as a whole.

== Post-independence ==
Léopoldville Province was divided in 1963–1966 into the provinces of Congo Central, Kwilu, Kwango, and Mai-Ndombe. Bandundu Province was formed in 1966 by merging Kwilu, Kwango and Mai-Ndombe. As of 2008, the Kwango District contained the territories of Kenge, Popokabaka, Feshi, Kasongo-Lunda and Kahemba. In 2015 Kwango Province was formed from the Kwango district, whose town of Kenge was elevated to capital city of the new province.

== Maps ==
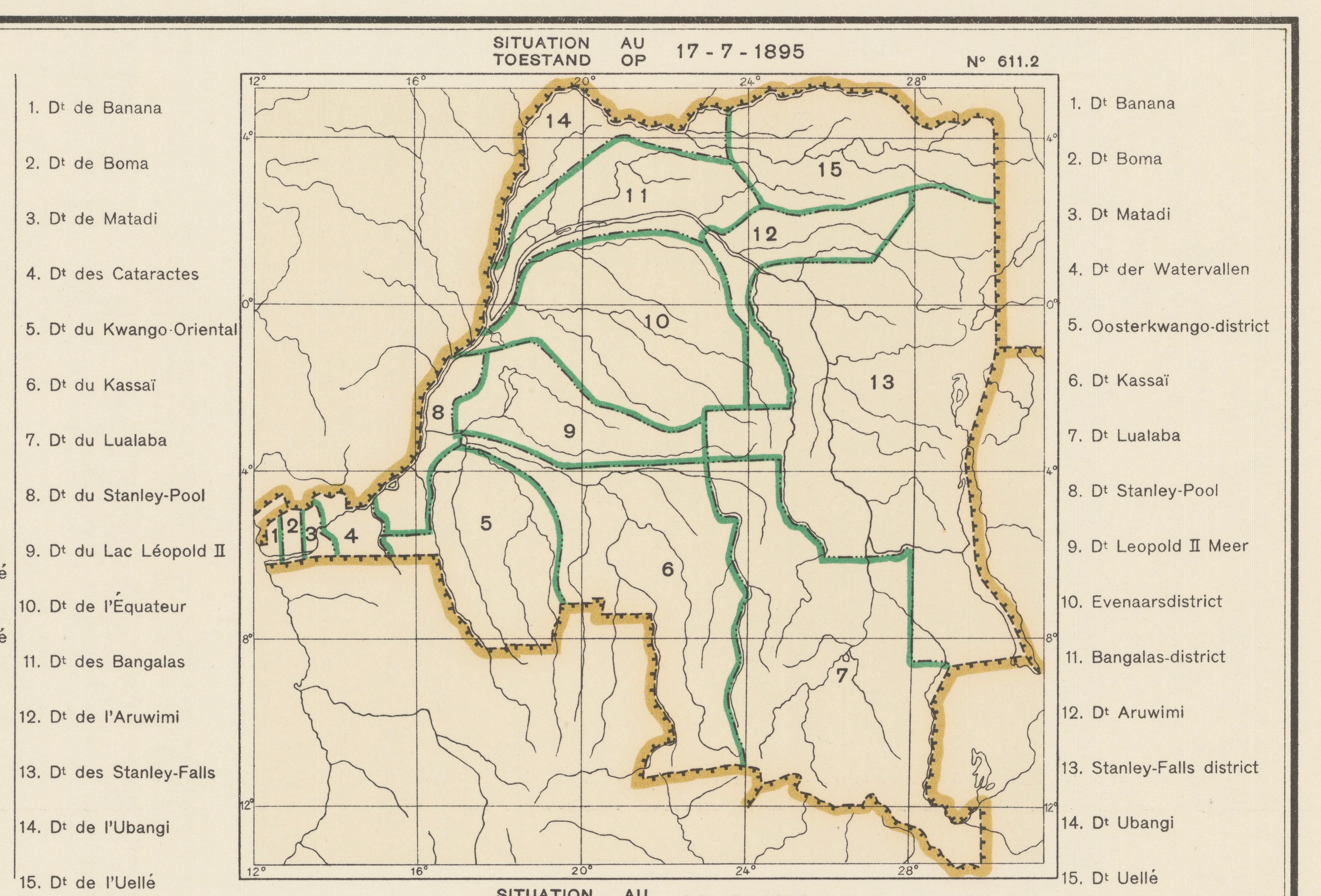
Districts of the Congo Free State in 1895

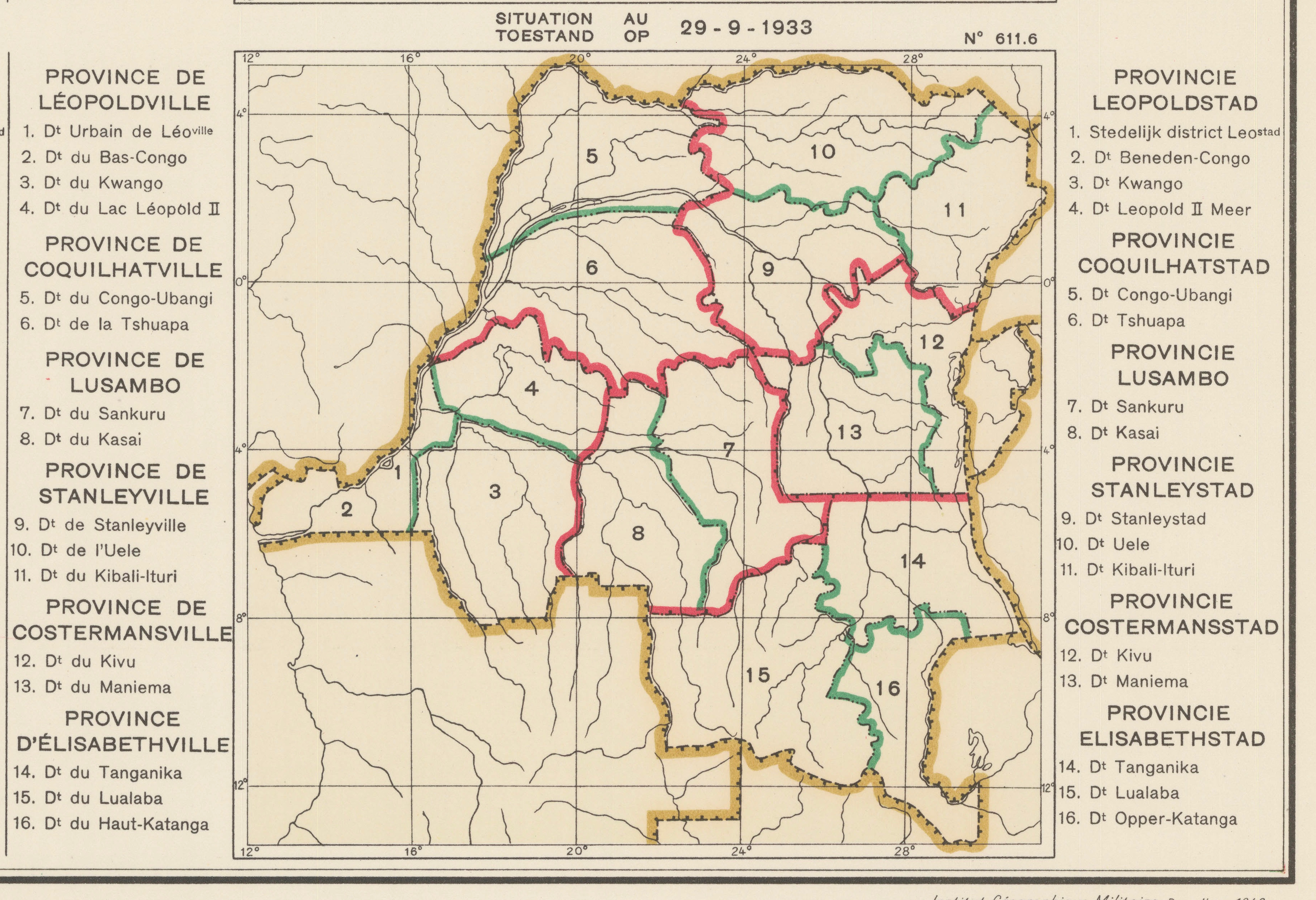
1933 provinces and districts

The present Kwango province

The present Kwilu province

== See also ==
- Districts of the Congo Free State
- Districts of the Belgian Congo
- Districts of the Democratic Republic of the Congo

== Sources ==
- Atlas général du Congo / Algemene atlas van Congo (in French and Dutch), Belgium: Institut Royal Colonial Belge, 1948–1963, OCLC 681334449
- Brass, William (8 December 2015), Demography of Tropical Africa, Princeton University Press, ISBN 978-1-4008-7714-0
- Blaes, X. (October 2008). "Découpage administratif de la République Démocratique du Congo" (PDF) (in French). UNOCHA and PNUD. Archived from the original (PDF) on 2010-04-01.
- "Congo (Kinshasa) Provinces", Rulers.org
- Lemarchand, René (1964), Political Awakening in the Belgian Congo, University of California Press, GGKEY:TQ2J84FWCXN
- Omasombo Tshonda, Jean (2014), Bas-Uele, Musée royal de l’Afrique centrale, ISBN 978-9-4916-1586-3
- Omasombo Tshonda, Jean (2015), Mongala : Jonction des territoires et bastion d'une identité supra-ethnique (PDF), Musée royal de l’Afrique centrale, ISBN 978-9-4922-4416-1
