= Kwilu District =

- District
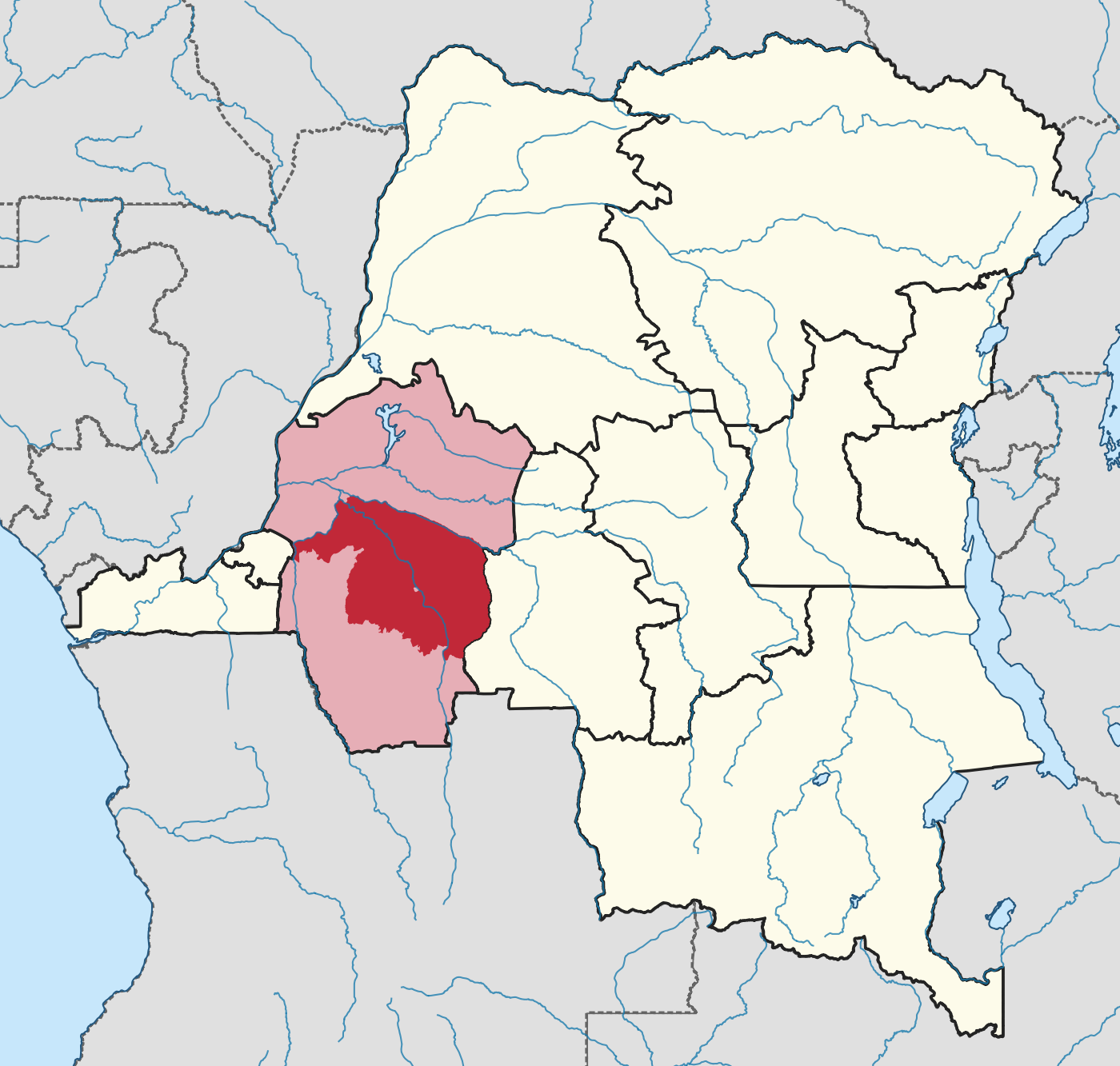
- Kwilu district of Bandundu province (2014)
- Coordinates: 5.033333°S 18.816667°E
- Country: Democratic Republic of the Congo
- Province: Bandundu
- District: Kwilu

Kwilu District (French: District du Kwilu, Dutch: District KwangoKwilu) was a district of the Belgian Congo and the Democratic Republic of the Congo. It roughly corresponded to the present province of Kwilu.

== Location ==
The Free State was annexed by Belgium in 1908 as the Belgian Congo. In 1933 the original four provinces were reorganized into six provinces, named after their capitals, and the central government assumed more control. The Congo-Kasaï province was split into Léopoldville and Lusambo (Kasai), the number of districts subsequently reducing to 15. A map of the districts in 1933 shows Kwango District in Léopoldville Province. It is bordered by Portuguese possessions to the south, Bas-Congo District to the west, Lac Léopold II District to the north and Kasai District to the east.

By 1954 Kwango District had been split into a smaller Kwango District in the south and Kwilu District in the north. Kwilu was bordered by Lac Leopold II District to the north, Kasai District to the east and Kwango District to the south and west. It covered essentially the same territory as the present Kwilu Province. The area was 78,400 square kilometres (30,300 sq mi) out of a total of 357,700 square kilometres (138,100 sq mi) for Leopoldville province as a whole.

== Post-independence ==
Léopoldville Province was divided in 1963–1966 into the provinces of Congo Central, Kwilu, Kwango, and Mai-Ndombe. Bandundu Province was formed in 1966 by merging Kwilu, Kwango and Mai-Ndombe. As of 2008 Kwilu District contained the territories of Bagata, Bulungu, Masi-Manimba, Gungu and Idiofa. Bandundu Province was broken up into provinces formed from its districts in 2015. Kwilu Province was formed from the Kwilu district and the independently administered cities of Bandundu and Kikwit. Bandundu retained its status as a provincial capital.

== Maps ==
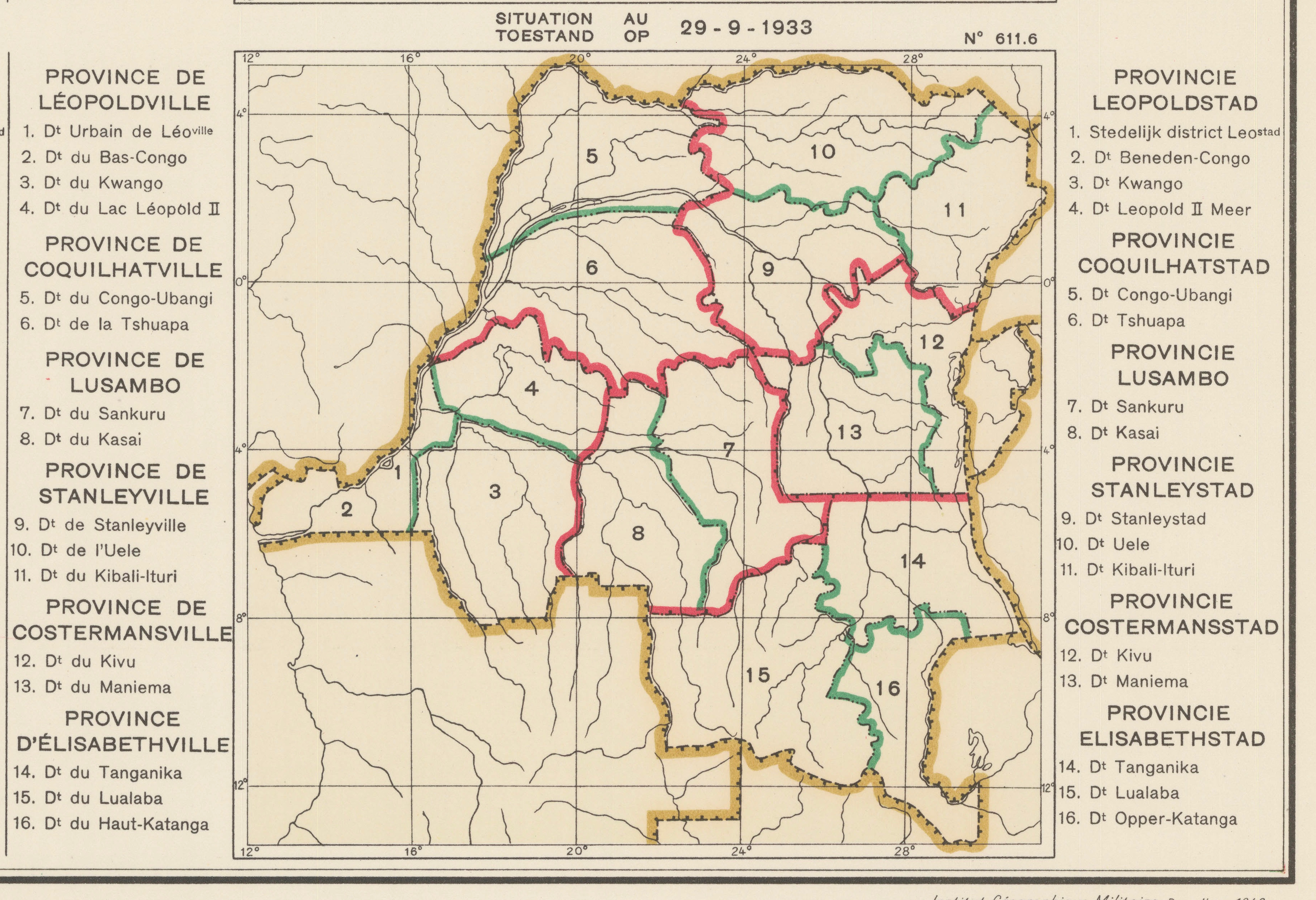
1933 provinces and districts

The present Kwilu province

The present Kwango province

== See also ==
- Districts of the Belgian Congo
- Districts of the Democratic Republic of the Congo

== Sources ==
- Atlas général du Congo / Algemene atlas van Congo (in French and Dutch), Belgium: Institut Royal Colonial Belge, 1948–1963, OCLC 681334449
- Brass, William (8 December 2015), Demography of Tropical Africa, Princeton University Press, ISBN 978-1-4008-7714-0
- Blaes, X. (October 2008). "Découpage administratif de la République Démocratique du Congo" (PDF) (in French). UNOCHA and PNUD. Archived from the original (PDF) on 2010-04-01.
- Bruneau, Jean-Claude (30 June 2009), "Les nouvelles provinces de la République Démocratique du Congo : construction territoriale et ethnicités", L'Espace Politique, 7 (2009–1), doi:10.4000/espacepolitique.1296
- "Congo (Kinshasa) Provinces", Rulers.org
- Lemarchand, René (1964), Political Awakening in the Belgian Congo, University of California Press, GGKEY:TQ2J84FWCXN
- "Loi organique nº 15/006 du 25 mars 2015 portant fixation des limites des provinces et celles de la ville de Kinshasa" (PDF). Journal officiel de la République Démocratique du Congo (in French). 56 (Special ed.). Article 15, col. 39. 28 Mar 2015. Archived (PDF) from the original on 17 April 2020.
