= Mai-Ndombe =

Mai-Ndombe may refer to:

- Mai-Ndombe District, a former district of Bandundu Province in the Democratic Republic of the Congo
- Mai-Ndombe Province, a province in the Democratic Republic of the Congo
- Lake Mai-Ndombe, a lake in Mai-Ndombe Province in the Democratic Republic of the Congo
