= Kasai District =

- District
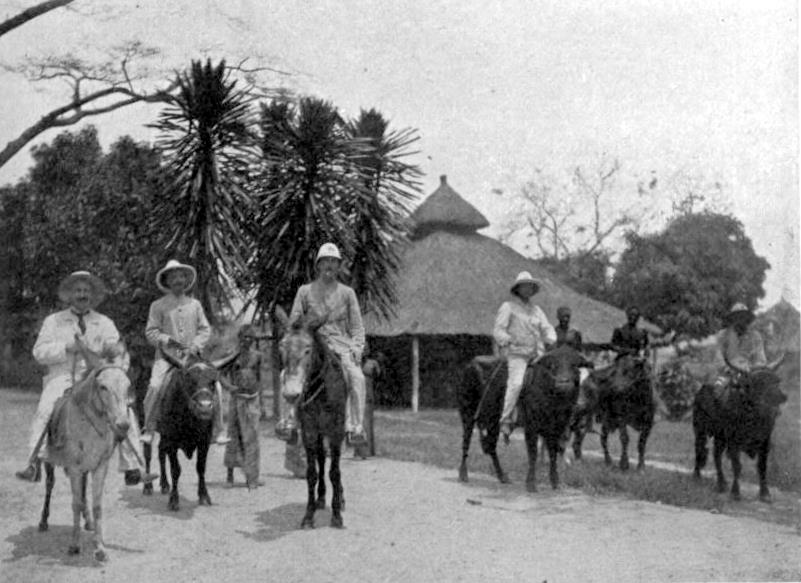
- Riders on various mounts (Lualaba-Kassai) before 1905

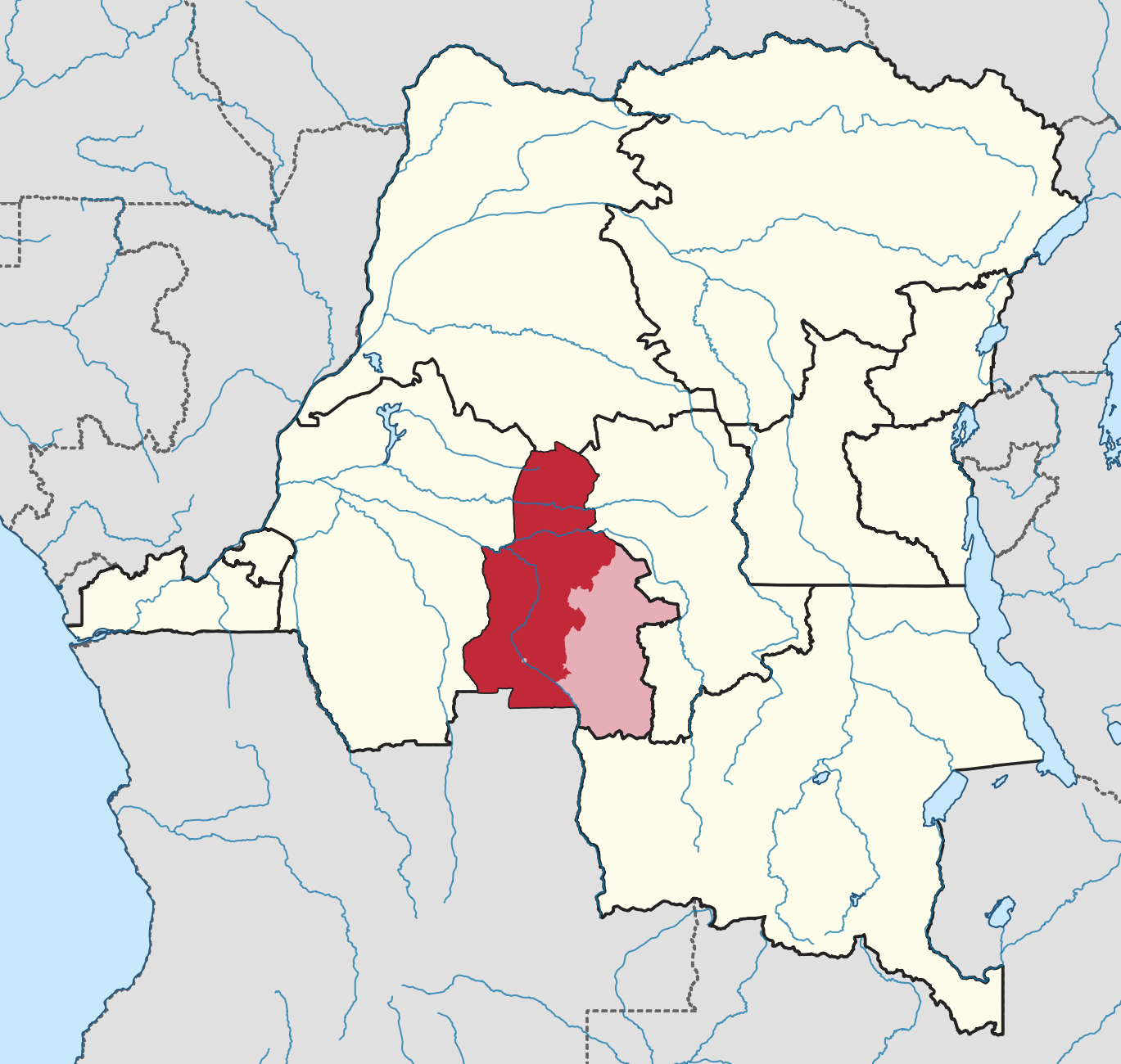
- Kasai district of Kasai-Occidental province (2014)
- Coordinates: 5.35°S 21.416667°E
- Country: Democratic Republic of the Congo
- Province: Kasaï
- District: Kasai

Kasai District (French: District du Kasai, Dutch: District Kasai) was a district of the Congo Free State, Belgian Congo and the Democratic Republic of the Congo, named after the Kasai River. It was formed around 1885 and went through several large changes in extent in the years that followed. The 1933 version of the district roughly corresponded to the former Kasai-Occidental province and the present Kasaï and Kasaï-Central provinces.

== Congo Free State ==
A decree of 3 September 1886 by the Congo Free State administrator general Camille Janssen defined nine districts in the colony, each headed by a district commissioner, including Lubuku-Kassaï District. Article 3 of the decree of 16 April 1887 provided for the Congo Free State to be divided into administrative districts headed by district commissioners, assisted by one or more deputies. The decree of 1 August 1888 divided the Congo Free State into eleven districts, in including the Kasai District with headquarters at Luluabourg.

A map of the Congo Free State drawn in 1897 shows Lualaba Kassai District extending eastward from Stanley Pool District along the Kasai River, then broadening out and stretching down to the southern boundary of the Congo Free State. In this map, Stanley Falls District is shown as also extending to the southern boundary. Other maps, drawn later, show Lualaba Kassai renamed Kasai District and a new Lualaba District formed from the southwest part of Stanley Falls District.

== Belgian Congo ==
The Congo Free State was annexed by Belgium in 1908 as the Belgian Congo. A map of administrative divisions in 1910 shows Kasai District still stretching down to the southern border of the colony, but extended to the northeast by including the eastern part of Lac Léopold II District, the western arm of Stanleyville District and the northwest arm of Lualaba District. To the east it bordered the Katanga and Stanleyville districts. In the northeast it bordered Aruwimi District, in the north Équateur District and in the northwest Lac Léopold II District. To the west it bordered Kwango District.

An arrêté royal of 28 March 1912 divided the Congo into 22 districts. A map of the divisions as of 28 March 1912 showed that the old Kasai District had been divided into a much smaller Kasai District bordering Kwango District to the west and a new Sankuru District to the northeast, with parts of the old Kasai District allocated to Lomami District to the west and Lulua District to the south, which also included parts of Katanga.

Congo-Kasai formally become a vice-government in 1919. It contained the districts of Bas-Congo, Léopoldville, Kwango, Kasai and Sankuru. With the 1933 reorganization Bas-Congo, Léopoldville, Kwango and Lac Léopold II were included in the Léopoldville Province while Kasai and Sankuru formed the new Lusambo Province. The Kasai and Sankuru districts had been expanded, in the case of Kasai by the addition of territory to the north taken from Lac Léopold II District.

Lusambo was renamed Kasai Province on 27 May 1947. Further changes formed Lulua District by 1954 from parts of Kasai and Sankuru districts. A 1955–1957 map shows Kasai District bordering Tshuapa District to the north, Sankuru District and Lulua District to the east, Portuguese territory to the south, and Kwango District, Kwilu District and Lac Léopold II District to the west. The area was 95,600 square kilometres (36,900 sq mi) out of a total of 323,100 square kilometres (124,700 sq mi) for Kasai province as a whole.

== Post-independence ==
On 14 August 1962 Kasaï Province was divided into five new provinces: Lomami, Luluabourg, Sankuru, Sud-Kasaï and Unité Kasaïenne. On 25 April 1966 Luluabourg and Unité Kasaïenne were united to form Kasaï-Occidental, while Lomami, Sankuru, and Sud-Kasaï were united in the new province of Kasaï-Oriental. In the period that followed, Kasaï District was located in Kasaï-Occidental province. It was bordered by Lulua District to the southeast, Kwango District to the southwest, Sankuru District, Tshuapa District, Kwilu District, Mai-Ndombe District, and the nation of Angola in the south. The capital of Kasaï district was the town of Luebo. The city of Tshikapa lay within the district, but was independently administered. It is now the capital of Kasaï Province. Territories were Dekese, Ilebo, Kamonia, Luebo and Mweka.

Kasaï-Occidental was split in 2015 into the Kasaï-Central and Kasaï provinces.

== Maps ==
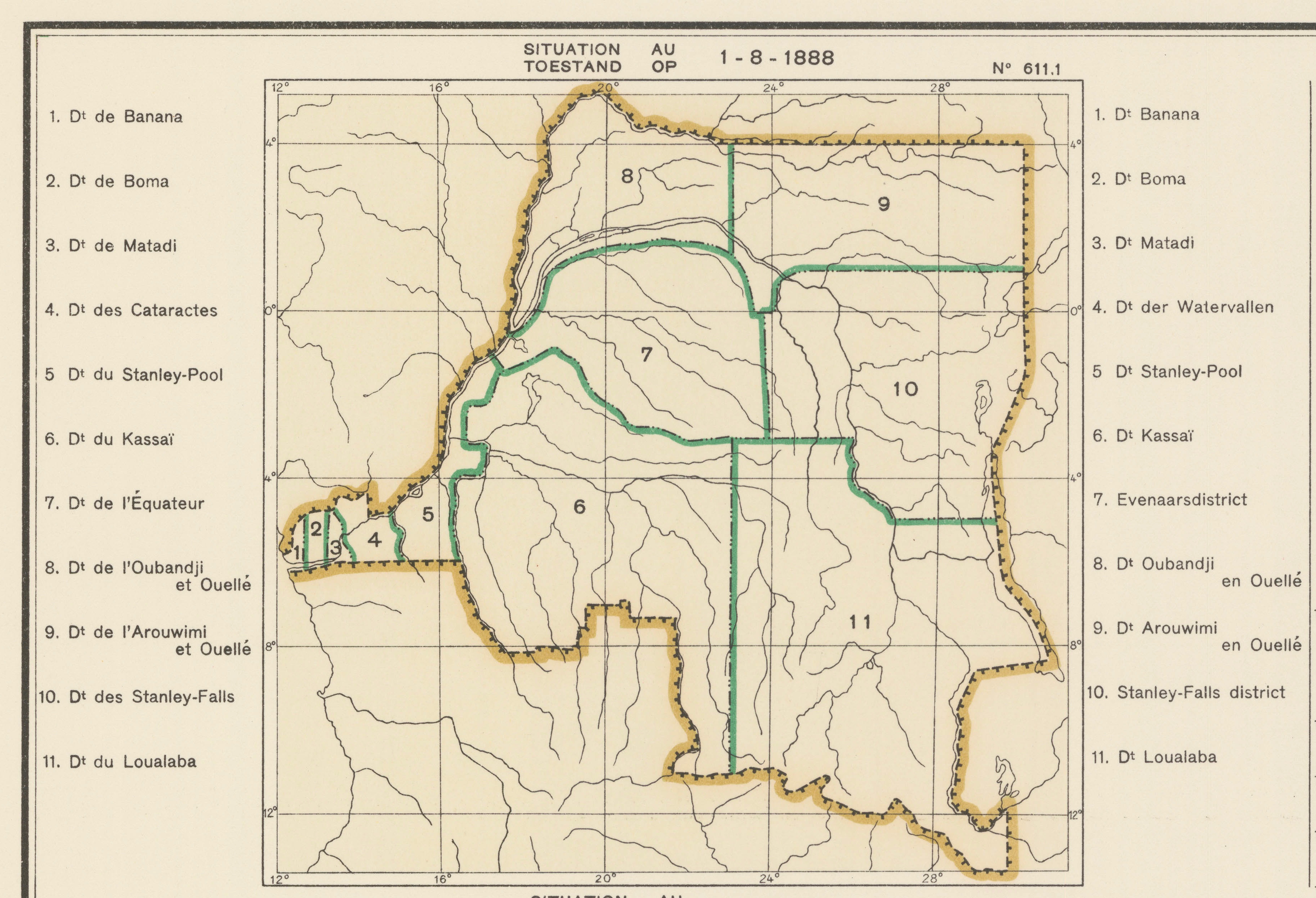
Districts of the Congo Free State in 1888. Kasai in southwest of main Congo Basin

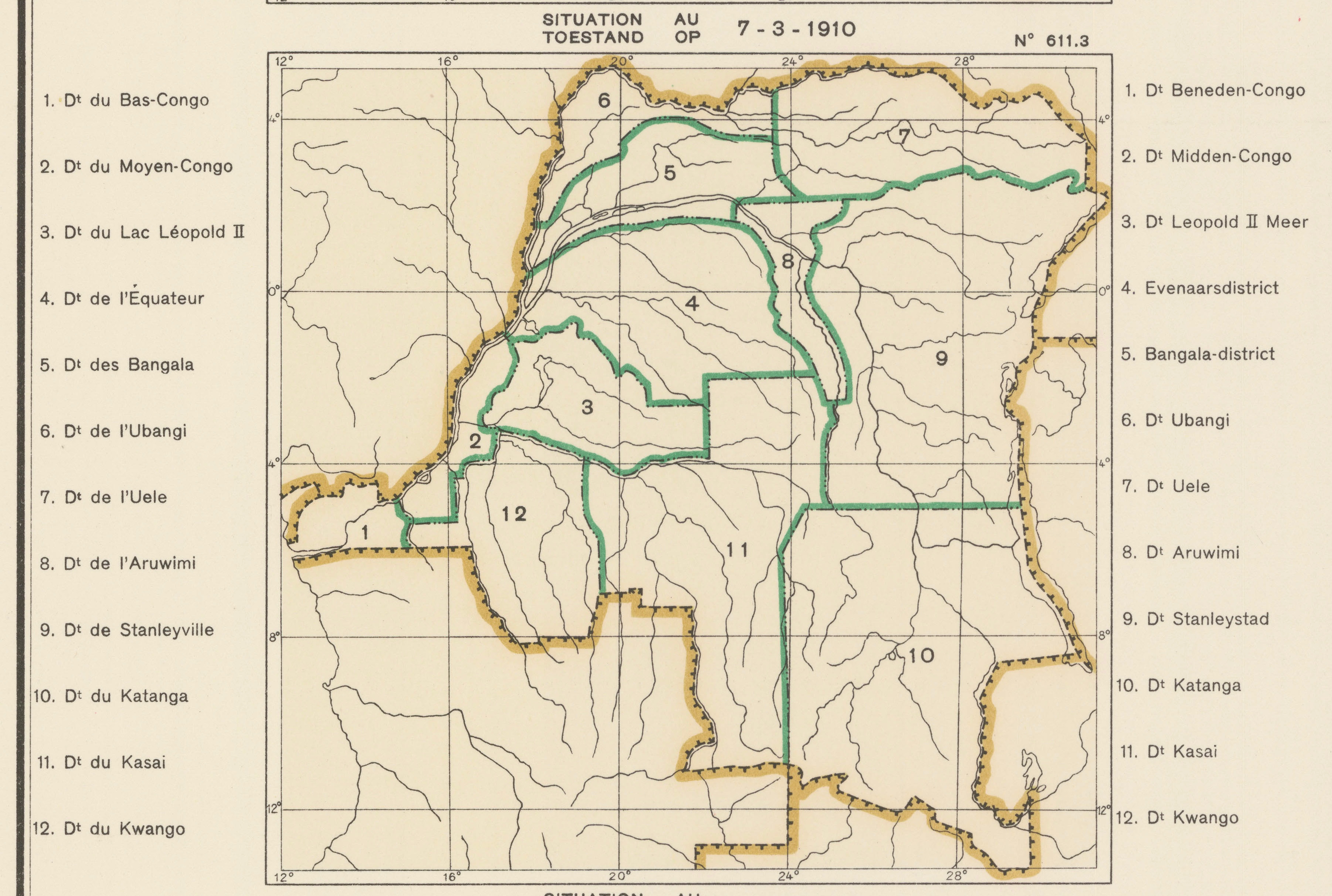
1910 districts. Kasai reduced in the west, extended in the east and northeast

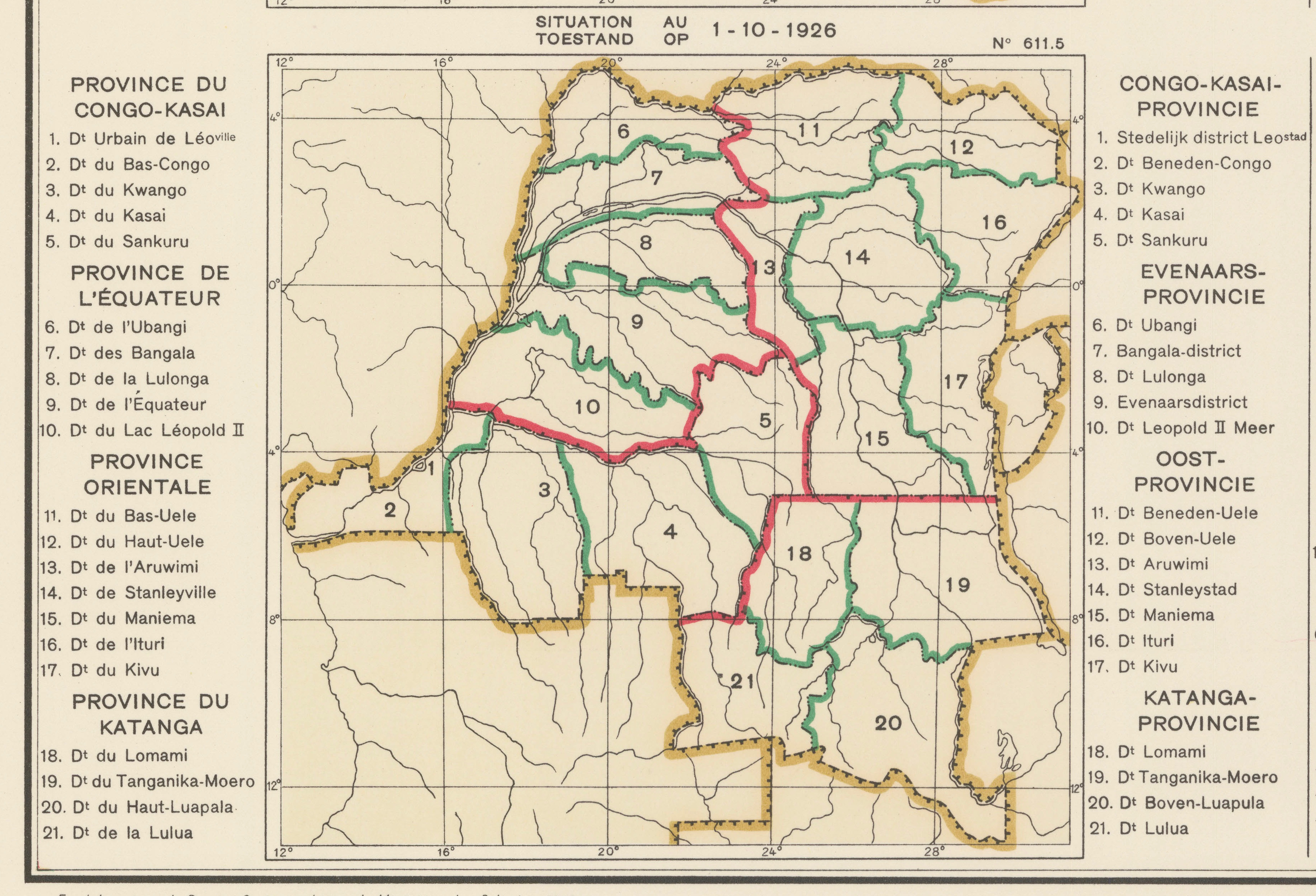
1926 provinces and districts. Congo-Kasai Province stretching east from the Congo's mouth

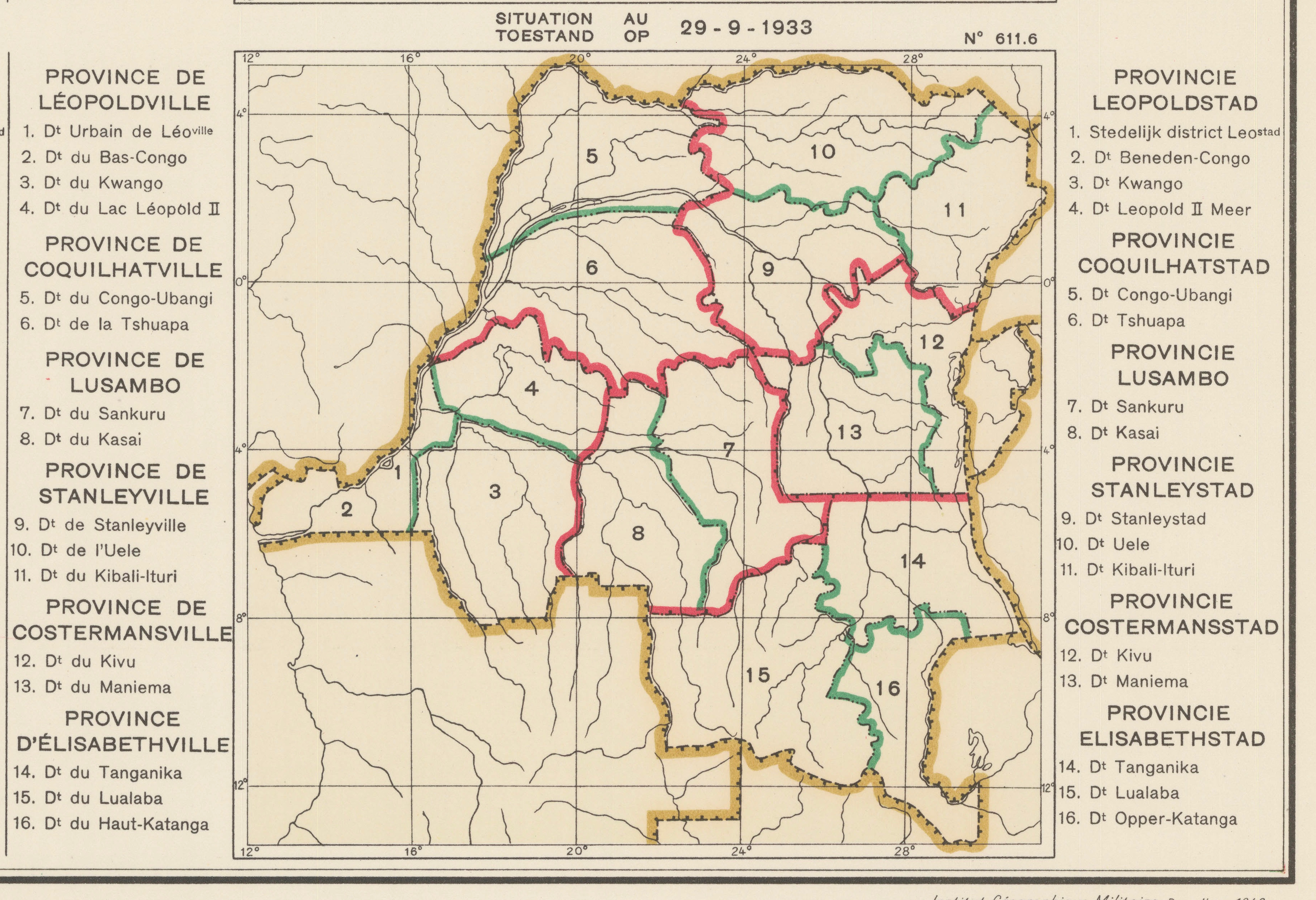
1933 provinces and districts
Kasai-Occidental

Kasaï Oriental

The current Kasaï province

The current Kasaï-Central province

== See also ==
- Districts of the Congo Free State
- Districts of the Belgian Congo
- Districts of the Democratic Republic of the Congo

== Sources ==
- Atlas général du Congo / Algemene atlas van Congo (in French and Dutch), Belgium: Institut Royal Colonial Belge, 1948–1963, OCLC 681334449
- Brass, William (8 December 2015), Demography of Tropical Africa, Princeton University Press, ISBN 978-1-4008-7714-0
- "Congo (Kinshasa) Provinces", Rulers.org
- Etat Indépendant du Congo (1886), Bulletin Officiel (PDF)
- Lemarchand, René (1964), Political Awakening in the Belgian Congo, University of California Press, GGKEY:TQ2J84FWCXN
- Omasombo Tshonda, Jean (2014), Bas-Uele, Musée royal de l’Afrique centrale, ISBN 978-9-4916-1586-3
- Omasombo Tshonda, Jean (2015), Mongala : Jonction des territoires et bastion d'une identité supra-ethnique (PDF), Musée royal de l’Afrique centrale, ISBN 978-9-4922-4416-1
