= Kwilu Province =

Province of the Democratic Republic of the Congo

Kwilu Province du Kwilu (French) Kizunga Kikwit (Kikongo)
- Province
- Province du Kwilu
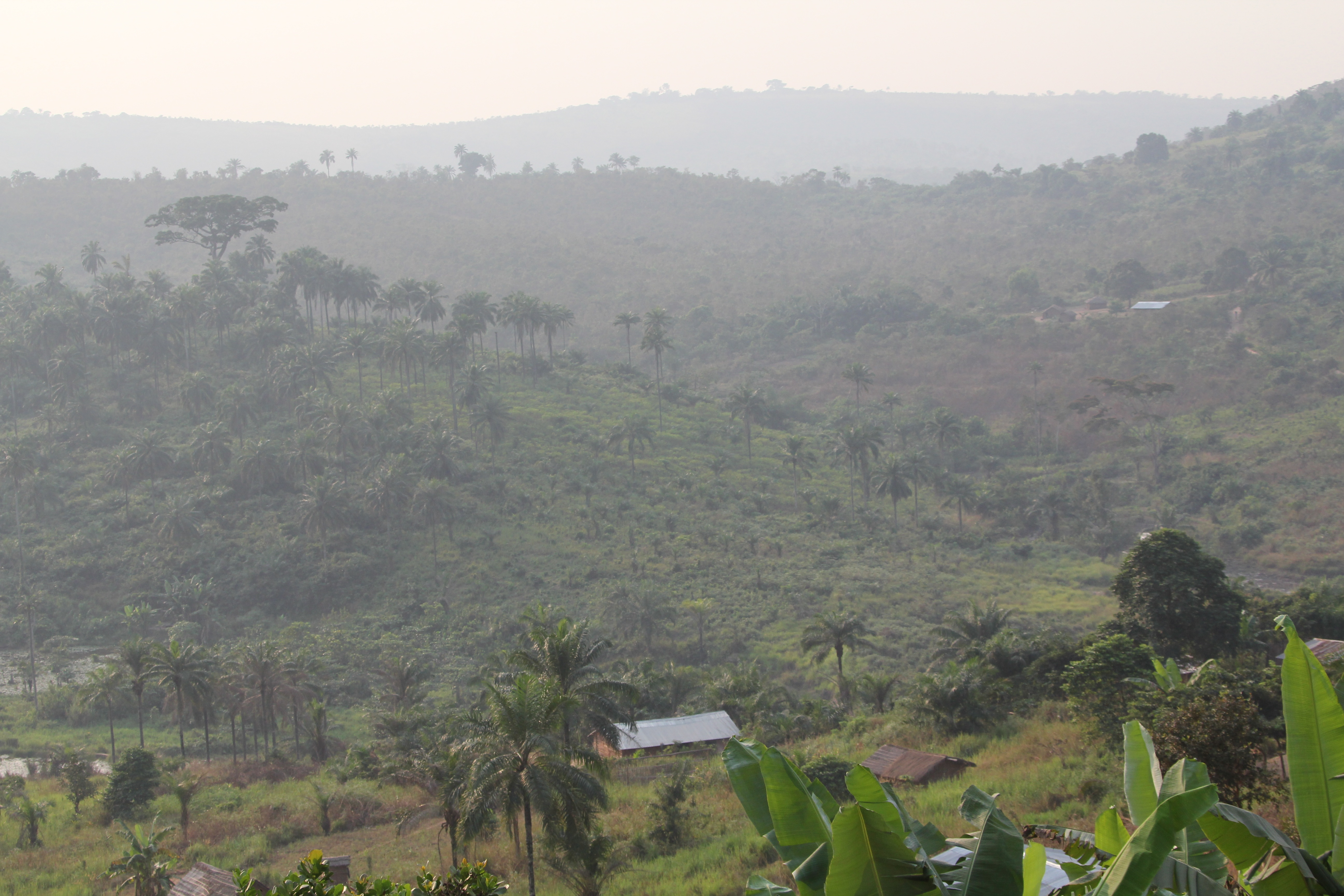
- The Congolian forest–savanna mosaic

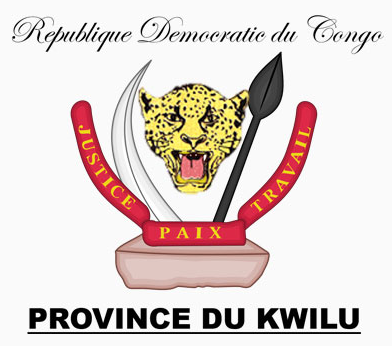
- Seal

- Coordinates: 5°2′S 18°49′E
- Country: DR Congo
- Established: 2015
- Named for: Kwilu River
- Capital: Bandundu
- Largest city: Kikwit

Government
  - Governor: Philippe Akamituna

Area
  - Total: 78,219 km^{2} (30,201 sq mi)

Population (2024)
  - Total: 6,898,105
  - Density: 88.190/km^{2} (228.41/sq mi)

Ethnic groups
  - Native: Bayanzi • Basuku • Badinga • Bakwese • Basonde • Babunda • Bapende • Balunda • Bahuana • Bambala • Bateke
- Time zone: UTC+1 (WAT)
- License Plate Code: (Democratic Republic of the Congo) CGO / 12
- Official language: French
- National language: Kikongo ya leta
- Website: https://kwiluprovince.com/

Kwilu is a province of the Democratic Republic of the Congo. It is one of the 21 provinces created in the 2015 repartitioning. Kwilu, Kwango, and Mai-Ndombe provinces are the result of the dismemberment of the former Bandundu province. Kwilu was formed from the Kwilu district and the independently administered cities of Bandundu and Kikwit. Bandundu is the provincial capital. The 2024 population was estimated to be 6,898,105.

The province takes its name from the Kwilu River, which crosses it from the southeast to the northwest.

== Geography ==
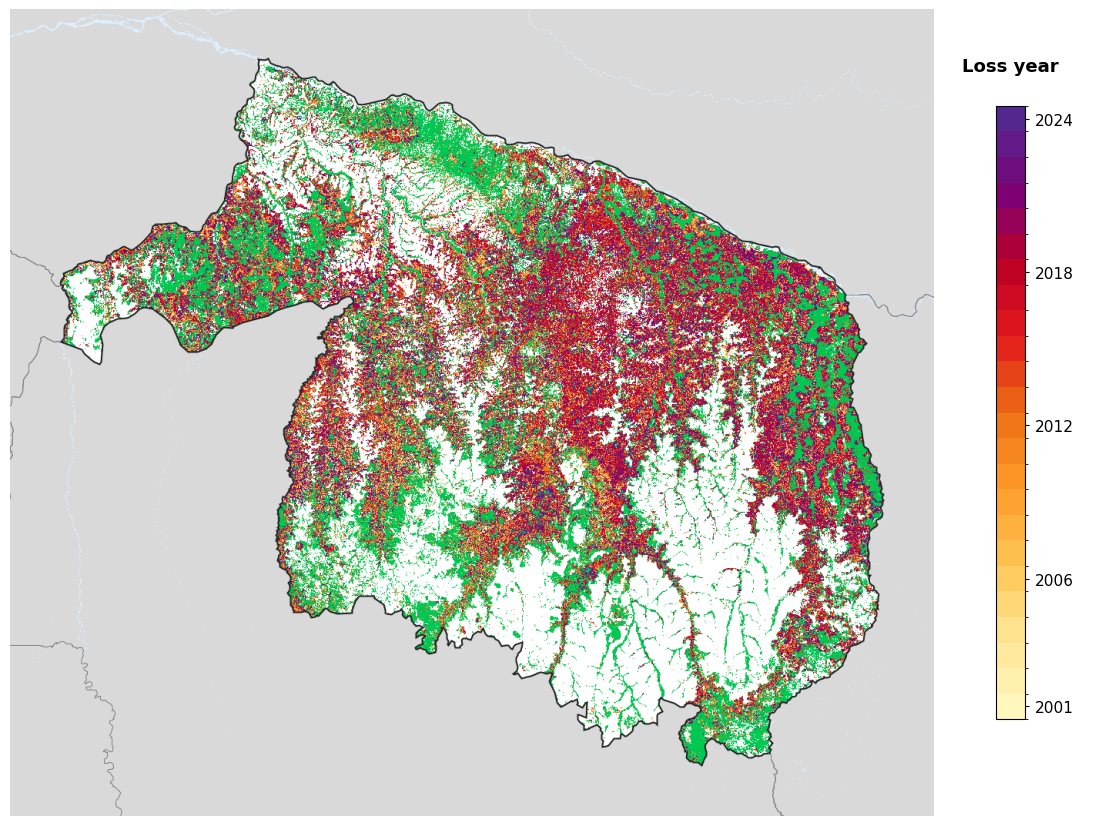
Tree-cover loss year in Kwilu, 2001-2024, from the Global Forest Change dataset.

Kwilu is located in the western Democratic Republic of the Congo. It shares borders with the provinces of Kinshasa to the west, Kasaï to the east, Kwango to the south, and Mai-Ndombe to the north. The entire province has a tropical savanna climate by the Köppen-Geiger climate classification.

| Administrative division | Type | Map |
|---|---|---|
| Bandundu | City | Bandundu |
| Kikwit | City | Kikwit |
| Bagata | Territory | Bagato |
| Bulungu | Territory | Bulungu |
| Gungu | Territory | Gungu |
| Idiofa | Territory | Idiofa |
| Masi-Manimba | Territory | Masi-Manimba |

== History ==
Kwilu was administered as a province from 1962 to 1966. However, in 1964 the administration was taken over by the central government due to a rebellion in southwestern Congo. A rebel administration under Pierre Mulele ran most of Kwilu province from January 1964. The province was reconquered by the legal government in June 1965. The provincial government was restored on January 18, 1966, but the province was merged with Kwango District and Mai-Ndombe District to create Bandundu Province.

President

- 8 Sep 1962 – 18 Jan 1964 Norbert Leta
- Jan 1964 – Nov 1964 Pierre Mulele (b. 1929 – d. 1968)
  - (commander-in-chief and Head of the General Direction)

Governor

- 18 Jan 1966 – 25 Apr 1966 Henri-Désiré Takizala

Between 1966 and 2015, Kwilu was administered as a district as part of Bandundu Province.
