= Lac Léopold II District =

- District
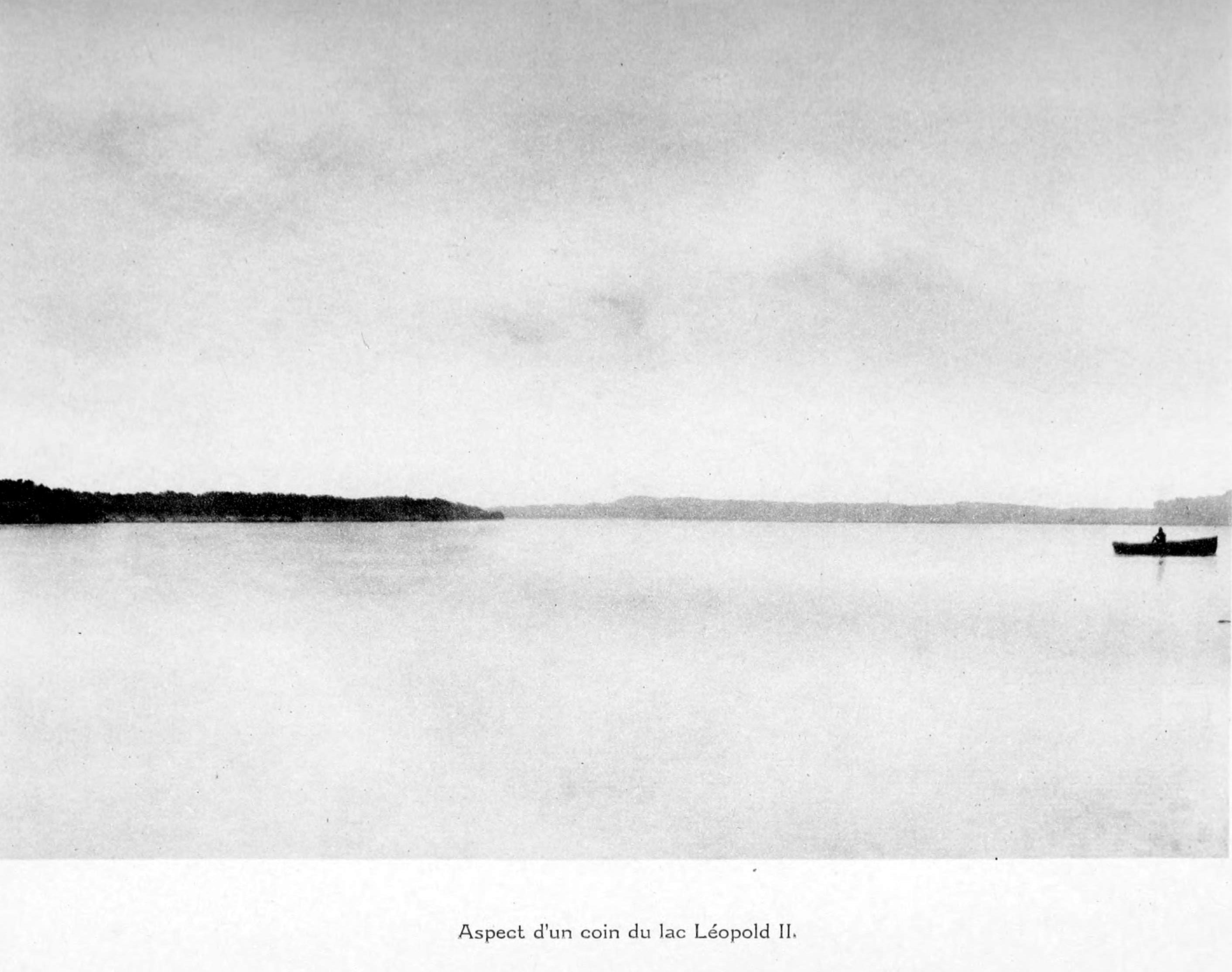
- View of a corner of Lake Leopold II c. 1888

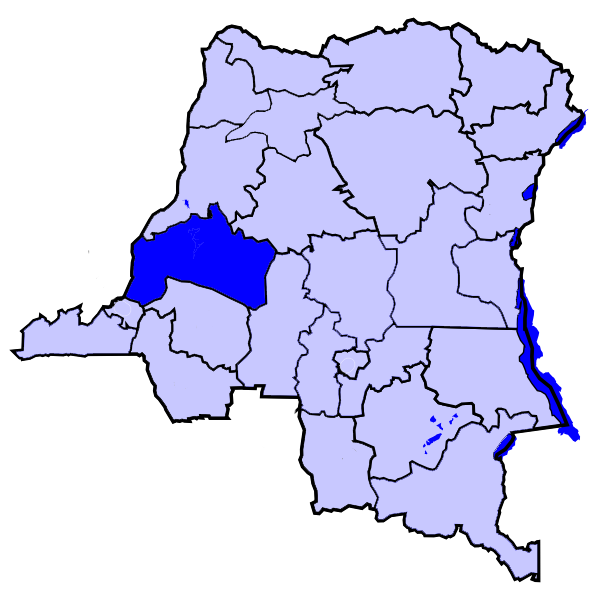
- Mai-Ndombe District
- Coordinates: 1.925490°S 18.288628°E
- Country: Belgian Congo
- Province: Équateur
- District: Lac Léopold II

Lac Léopold II District (French: District du Lac Léopold II, Dutch: District Leopold II Meer) was a district of the Congo Free State, Belgian Congo and Democratic Republic of the Congo. It went through various changes in extent, but roughly corresponded to the modern Mai-Ndombe Province.

== Location ==
The district takes its name from Lac Léopold II, today called Lake Mai-Ndombe, which drains to the west along the Fimi River to the Kasai River, a major left tributary of the Congo River. The district seat was the town of Inongo, on the northeast shore of the lake. At its greatest extent between 1914 and 1933 the district extended west from the lake to the Congo River. To the east it extended along the whole length of the Lokoro River in the north, and along most of the Lukenie River in the south up to the border of the present Sankuru province.

== History ==
In 1895 the number of the districts in the Congo Free State was increased to fifteen, including Lac Léopold II District. The district had been carved out of the north of Kasai District. A map of the Congo Free State in 1897 shows the Lac Léopold II district to the east of the Stanley Pool District, south of the Équateur District and north of the Lualaba Kassai District. The district surrounds Lac Léopold II, and extends in a rectangular area along the whole length of the Lukenie River to the east. The Lokoro River is not shown. The western portion, previously part of the Moyen-Congo District, was added to Lac Léopold II District in 1914.

The period between 1927 and 1933 was unsettled, particularly in the Dengese Territory in the east of the district on the border with Sankuru District. There were police actions and occupations in 1927, and the authorities ordered complete disarmament of the population. Police actions continued in 1928, and at the start of 1929 the territory was subject to general occupation. In August 1931 an administrator was ambushed by Dengese helped by some Bapende and Bankutshu. 15 of the attackers were killed before they withdrew after killing one soldier and wounding another. A massive military operation was ordered in response, but incidents continued.

Resistance combined passive disobedience such as refusal to pay taxes and active attacks such as arson in Dija. The situation was gradually brought under control, and by mid-March the district was generally calm. The whole Dengese territory was occupied until December 1932, and occupations of Gandeole, Ikongolo, Tshiki and Gele in the Dengese area continued until December 1934. Factors that had contributed to the revolt included the arrival of newcomers from the Sankuru District to the east, the use of force to compel labor on the cotton plantations, and the economic downturn of 1931.

During the reorganization of 1933 a portion in the east was removed from Lac Léopold II District and added to Kasaï District, while a portion in the west along the Congo River was added to the Bas-Congo District. The smaller Lac Léopold II District was part of the new Léopoldville Province. The district in 1955–1957 was essentially the same as the current Mai-Ndombe Province. It bordered the French possessions to the east, Kwango and Kwilu districts to the south, Kasai District to the west, and Tshuapa and Equateur districts to the north. The area was 127,200 square kilometres (49,100 sq mi) out of a total of 357,700 square kilometres (138,100 sq mi) for Leopoldville province as a whole.

In the 1960s the province was renamed to Bandundu Province and the district was renamed to Mai-Ndombe District.

== Maps ==
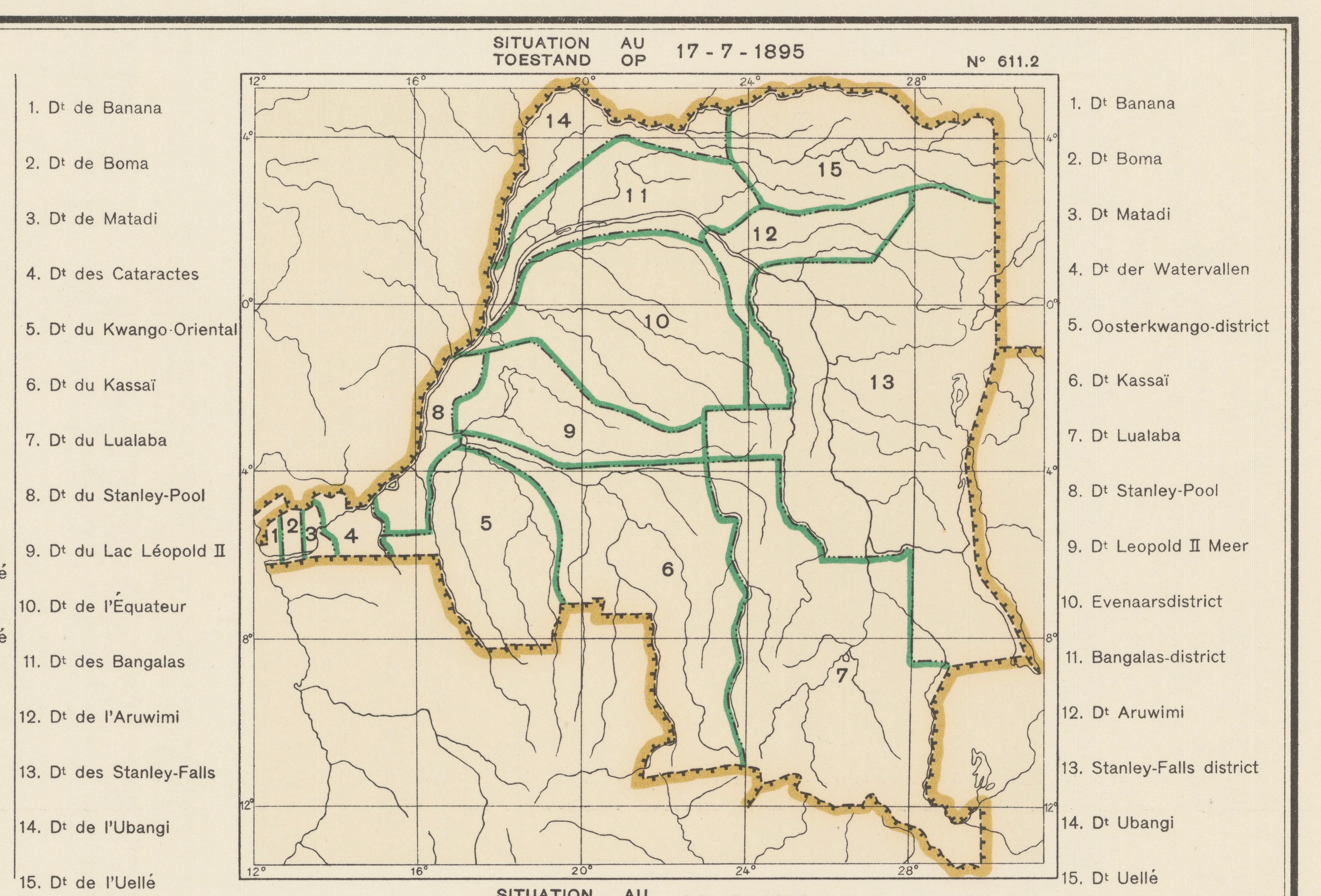
Districts of the Congo Free State in 1895

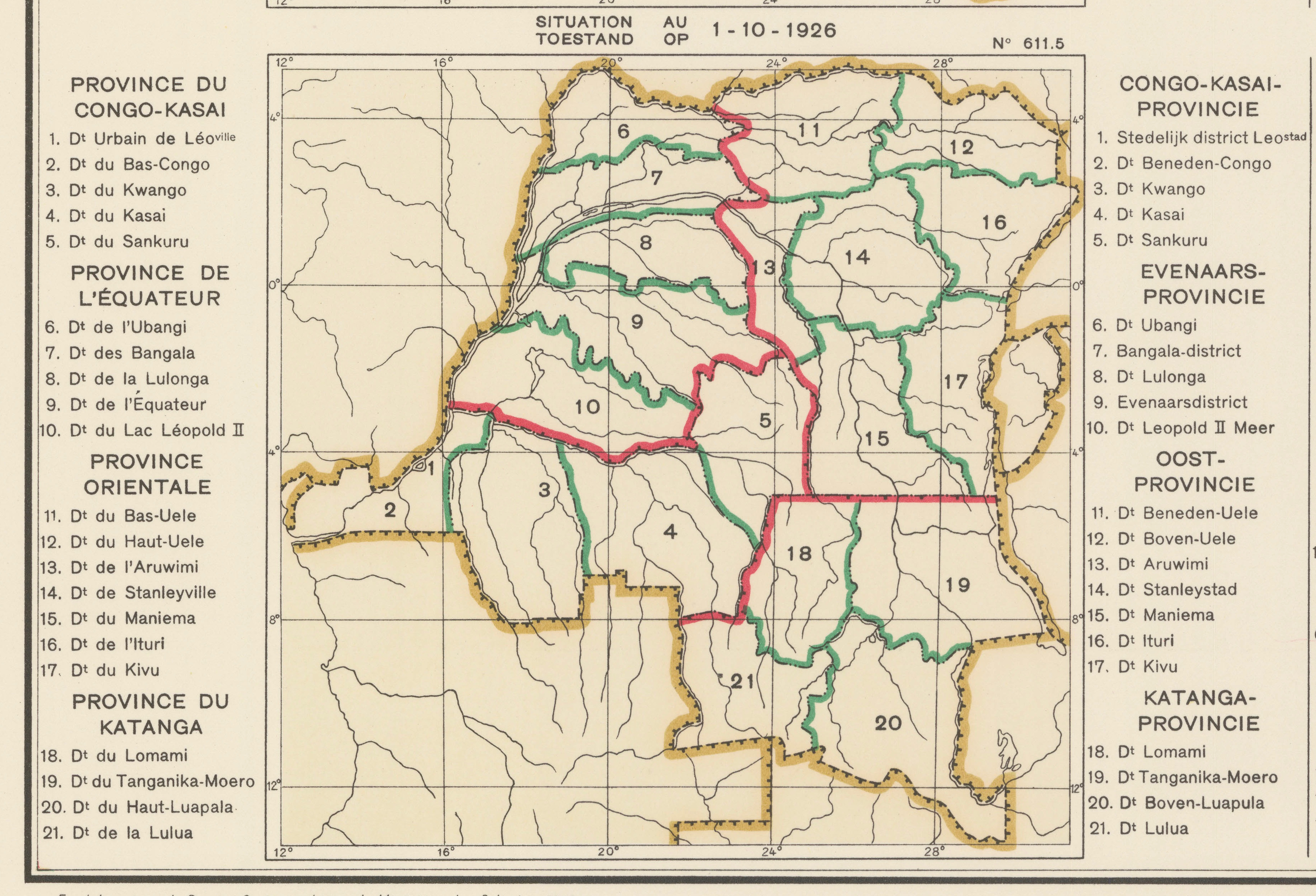
1926 provinces and districts

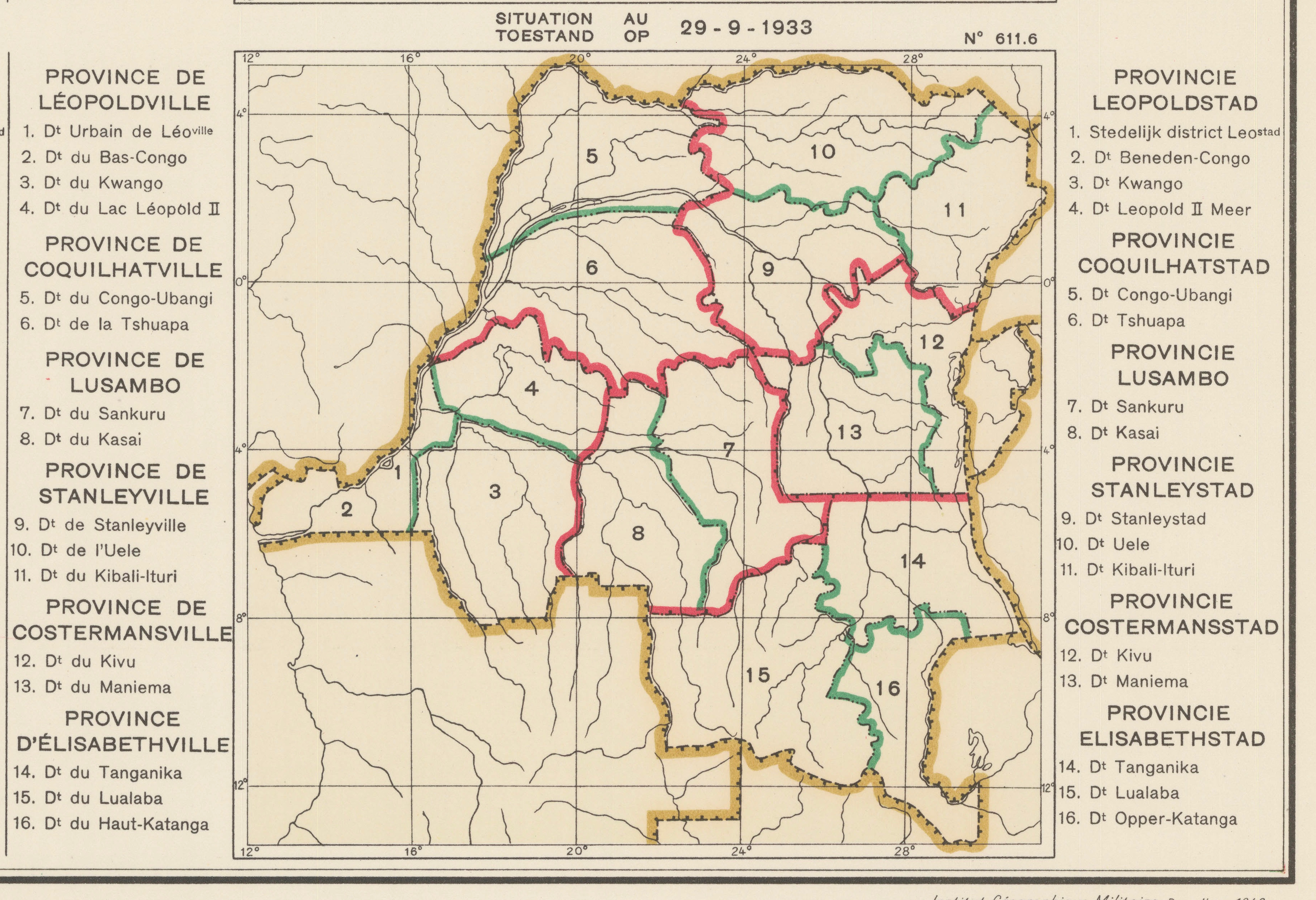
1933 provinces and districts

Mai-Ndombe province location today

== See also ==
- Districts of the Congo Free State
- Districts of the Belgian Congo
- Districts of the Democratic Republic of the Congo
- Mai-Ndombe District

== Sources ==
- Atlas général du Congo / Algemene atlas van Congo (in French and Dutch), Belgium: Institut Royal Colonial Belge, 1948–1963, OCLC 681334449
- Brass, William (8 December 2015), Demography of Tropical Africa, Princeton University Press, ISBN 978-1-4008-7714-0Nollet, Veerle (2003), "Conflict and Subversion in the Central Congo between 1920 and 1940", Annales Aequatoria, 24, Honoré Vinck: 77–96, JSTOR 25836808
- Omasombo Tshonda, Jean (2014), Bas-Uele, Musée royal de l’Afrique centrale, ISBN 978-9-4916-1586-3
- Omasombo Tshonda, Jean (2015), Mongala : Jonction des territoires et bastion d'une identité supra-ethnique (PDF), Musée royal de l’Afrique centrale, ISBN 978-9-4922-4416-1
