= Mai-Ndombe District =

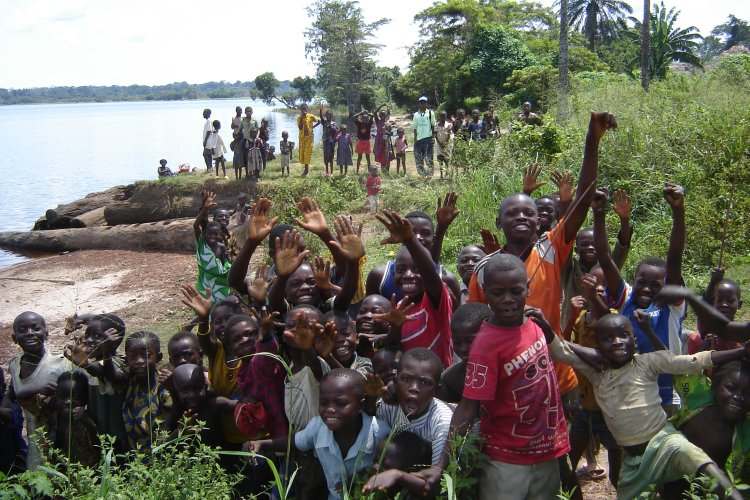
- Children beside Lake Mai-Ndombe, April 2006

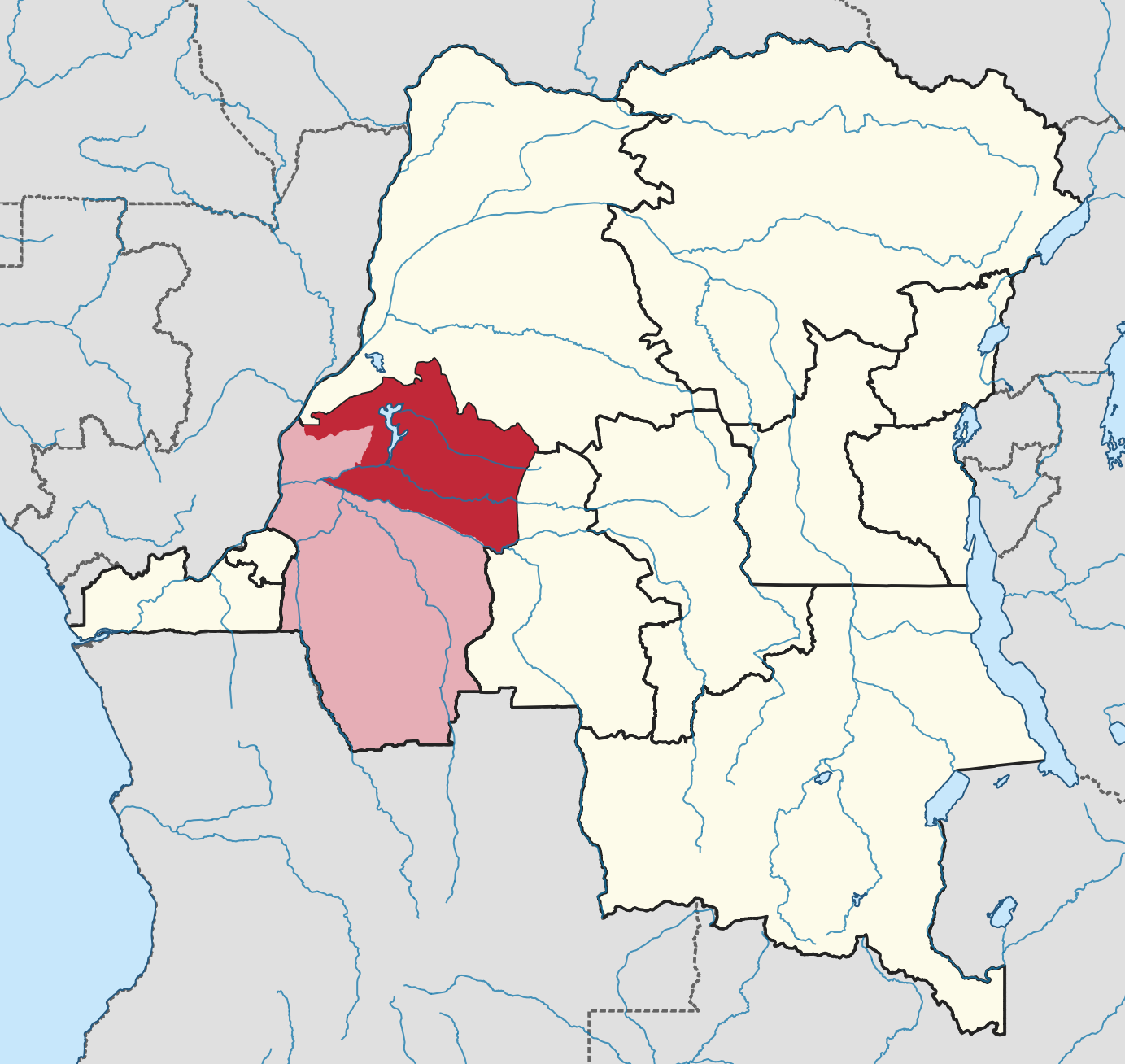
- Mai-Ndombe district of Bandundu province (2014)
- Coordinates: 1.927394°S 18.285713°E
- Country: Democratic Republic of the Congo
- Province: Bandundu

Area
  - Total: 98,851 km^{2} (38,167 sq mi)
- National language: Lingala

Mai-Ndombe District was a district of pre-2015 Bandundu Province in the Democratic Republic of the Congo. It covered roughly the same area as the colonial-era Lac Léopold II District. In 2015, it was merged with Plateaux District, all in pre-2015 Bandundu Province, to form the new Mai-Ndombe Province.

== Location ==
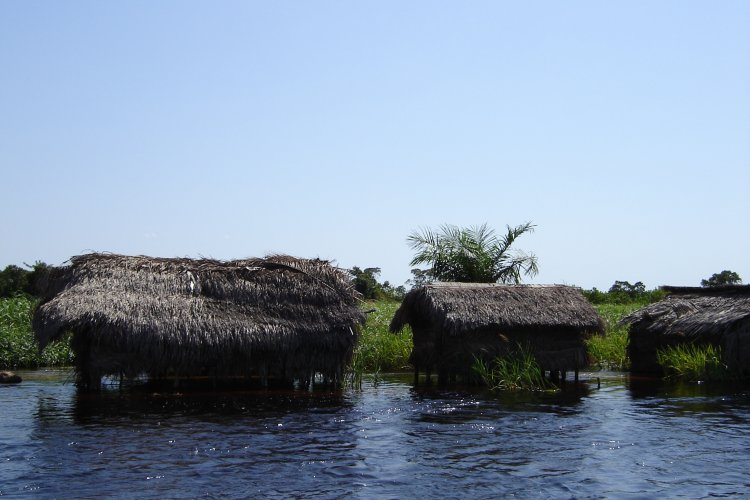
Houses on Lake Mai-Ndombe

Mai-Ndombe extends north from the Kasai River and is separated from the Congo River to the east by the Plateaux District. The district takes its name from the large but shallow Lake Mai-Ndombe, which covers 2,300 square kilometres (890 sq mi) but expands to double or triple that size in the rainy season. The Lukenie River flows from the east and runs through the southern part of the district. The Lukenie joins with the Fimi River, which drains Lake Mai-Ndombe and continues westward to join the Kasai at Mushie.

The district includes the Mai Ndombe Conservation Concession, an area of 299,640 hectares (740,400 acres) on the western shore of Lake Mai Ndombe in the Inongo Territory. The concession extends over the Ntomba, Baselenge, and Bolia sectors. This is the first REDD+ community-based forest conservation project in the country.

== Economy ==
Even by the standards of the country, Mai-Ndombe District is relatively undeveloped. During the colonial era the region was a major producer of rubber, copal, textile fibers, palm nuts and lumber. Since independence it has been neglected. Buildings such as schools, health centers, hospitals, offices and churches from the earlier period have been allowed to deteriorate. Although roads in Kutu territory have been maintained by non-government organizations, Oswhe territory in the east no longer has any roads or bridges. Ports have also been abandoned. The Forest Development Corporation SODEFOR employs several hundred workers, and a few other companies also operate in the district.

Bokoro, Inongo, Kiri, Kutu, Nioki, Oshwe

== Administrative divisions ==
Mai-Ndombe included the following territory-level division units:

=== Territories ===
- Inongo
- Kiri
- Kutu
- Nioki
- Oshwe

The administrative center is the town of Inongo on the east shore of Lake Mai-Ndombe.

Under the February 2006 constitution, Plateaux District, Mai-Ndombe District and the city of Bandundu were to be combined into a new Mai-Ndombe Province, with the change taking effect before 18 February 2009. As of October 2010, this had not taken place, and the ruling party was calling for a further extension to the deadline.
