= Kutu, Democratic Republic of the Congo =

Kutu
- Commune
- Location in Democratic Republic of the Congo
- Coordinates: 2°43′11″S 18°8′40″E
- Country: DR Congo
- Province: Mai-Ndombe
- Territory: Kutu
- Time zone: UTC+1 (West Africa Time)

Kutu is a town and territory in Mai-Ndombe Province, Democratic Republic of the Congo. The city of Kutu is situated at the intersection of the Fimi River and the southern tip of Lake Mai-Ndombe. However, the district municipality or the territory of the same name stretches mainly between the Lukeni River in the East, the Kasai River in the West and the Fimi River in the North.
