= Plateaux District =

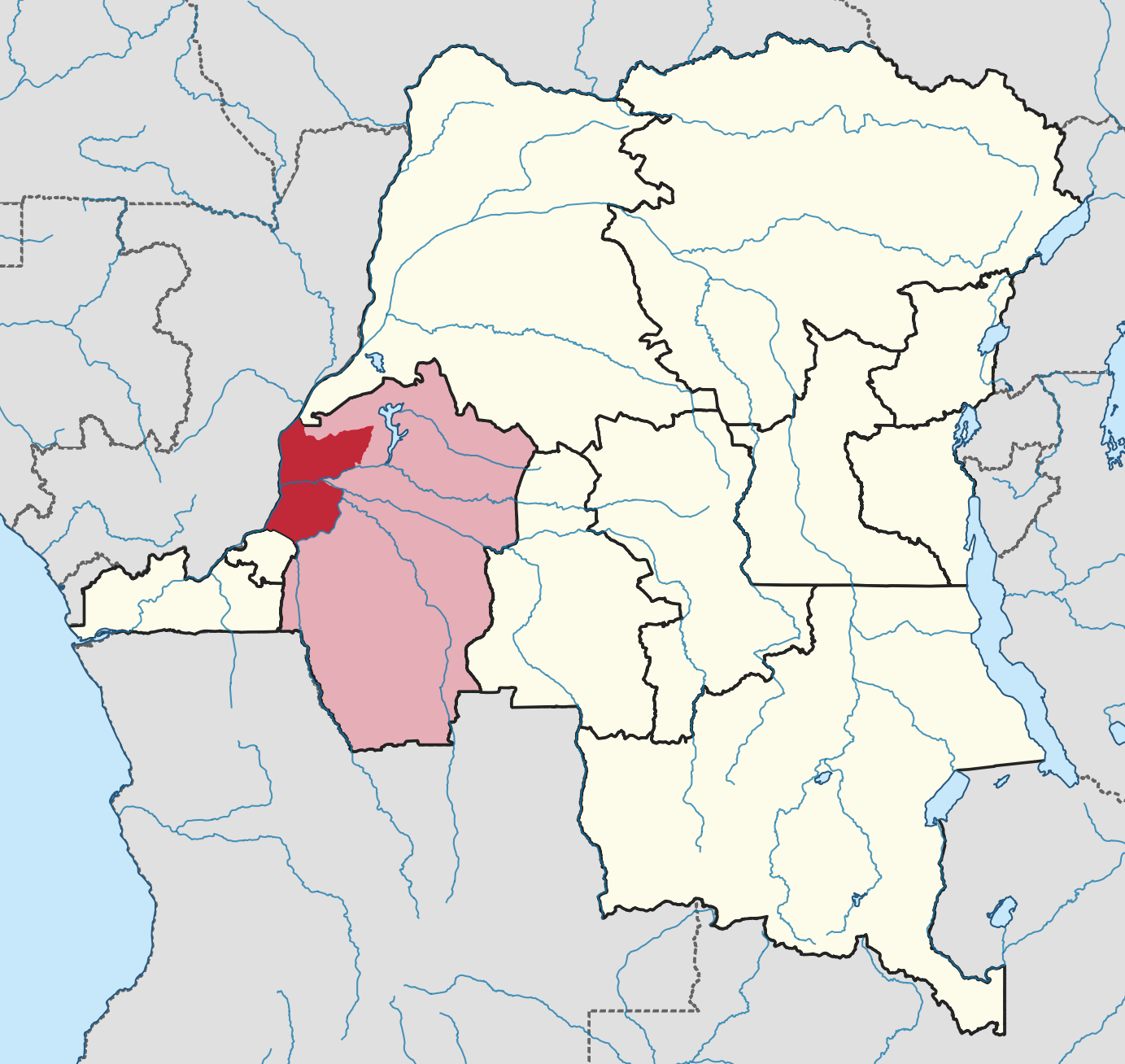
- Plateaux district of Bandundu province (2014)
- Coordinates: 3.0°S 16.7°E
- Country: Democratic Republic of the Congo
- Province: Bandundu
- National language: Lingala

The Plateaux District was a former district located in the current Mai-Ndombe Province, but until the 2015 repartitioning it was part of the former Bandundu Province.

== Location ==
The district lies on the east bank of the Congo River, just upriver from Kinshasa, with the Republic of the Congo to the west. The Kwah River separates the district into southern and northern halves . This northern half is within the Tumba-Ngiri-Maindombe area, the largest Wetland of International Importance in the world, recognized by the Ramsar Convention.

== Administrative divisions ==
The Plateaux District included the following territory-level division units:

=== Territories ===
- Bolobo
- Kwamouth
- Mushie
- Yumbi

=== Towns ===
- Bolobo
- Mushie
