= Congo-Kasaï =

Province of the Belgian Congo

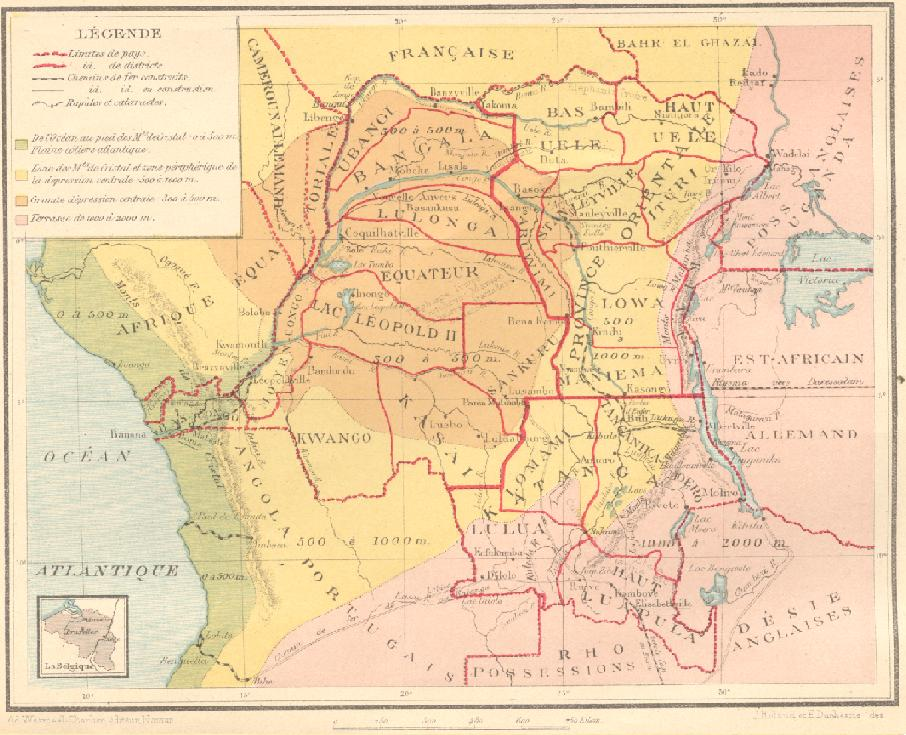
Belgian Congo districts in 1914, before the grouping into provinces

Belgian Congo provinces in 1920

Congo-Kasaï was one of the four large provinces of the Belgian Congo defined in 1914. It was formally established in 1919, and in 1933 was divided into the new provinces of Léopoldville and Lusambo.

== Location ==
Congo-Kasaï was named after the Kasai River, a major left tributary of the Congo River that provides access to the region. By 1910 a factory of the Kasai Company had been established near Misumba, which had about two thousand inhabitants. The company had made successful trial rubber plantations. The company also bought rubber and ivory from the local people, some of whom used it to buy liquor from the Portuguese territory (Angola).

Congo-Kasaï had five districts: the urban district of Léopoldville, capital of the colony, and the districts (from west to east) of Bas-Congo, Kwango, Kasaï and Sankuru. The Huileries du Congo Belge company had two zones (or circles) of exploitation in the province based on Brabanta and Leverville, of which Leverville was the most important.

== History ==
In the early days of the Belgian Congo the colony was divided into 22 vaguely defined districts. As the colonial system became established the rulers felt the need to assign the ethnic groups to defined territories, where before they had often been mobile. An arrêté royal of 28 July 1914 grouped the districts into the provinces of Congo-Kasaï, Équateur, Orientale Province and Katanga, with the objective of improving responsiveness through decentralization. The consolidation had in fact started in Katanga in 1912 and Orientale in 1913, but Congo-Kasai did not formally become a vice-government until 1919. Each province was made up of several of the existing districts, which were in turn divided into territories. The territories were divided into sectors. A great many chiefdoms were recognized. Several of the smallest might be combined into one sector, while the largest chiefdoms were split across sectors.

As diamond mining activity increased, followed by copper, gold and tin mining in different parts of the colony, it became increasingly hard to recruit workers. Often laborers were obtained from the village chiefs through a combination of commissions and sanctions, and were then taken long distances from their homes to the mines. Death rates were high among the laborers due to poor diet, hard work and greater exposure to diseases, while birth rates were lower. The Commission for the Protection of the Natives in the Congo reported on the problems in 1919. The government and businesses both saw the value of keeping the workforce healthy and productive. The Kasai Company was given a 185,000 acres (75,000 ha) concession for plantations to provide more food to their mine workers. The governor of Congo-Kasaï published regulations that detailed the minimum quantity and quality of rations.

The original four provinces had considerable autonomy, but in 1933 they were reorganized into six provinces, named after their capitals, and the central government assumed more control. Congo-Kasai was divided into the new provinces of Léopoldville and Lusambo. In 1947 Lusambo was renamed to Kasaï. In 1965 Kasaï was split into Kasaï-Occidental and Kasaï-Oriental.

== See also ==
- List of governors of Kasaï (former province)

== Sources ==
- Bruneau, Jean-Claude (30 June 2009), "Les nouvelles provinces de la République Démocratique du Congo : construction territoriale et ethnicités", L'Espace Politique, 7 (2009–1), doi:10.4000/espacepolitique.1296
- Derksen, Richard (1983), "Forminiere in the Kasai, 1906–1939", African Economic History (12, Business Empires in Equatorial Africa), University of Wisconsin Press: 49–65, doi:10.2307/3601316, JSTOR 3601316
- Lemarchand, René (1964), Political Awakening in the Belgian Congo, University of California Press, GGKEY:TQ2J84FWCXN
- Torday, E. (July 1910), "Land and Peoples of the Kasai Basin", The Geographical Journal, 36 (1), The Royal Geographical Society (with the Institute of British Geographers): 26–53, doi:10.2307/1777651, JSTOR 1777651
- Vanderlinden, Jacques (2007), Main-d'œuvre, Eglise, Capital et Administration dans le Congo des années trente (PDF), Fontes Historiæ Africanæ (in French), vol. I, Academie Royale Des Sciences D'outre-mer
