= Sankuru District =

- District
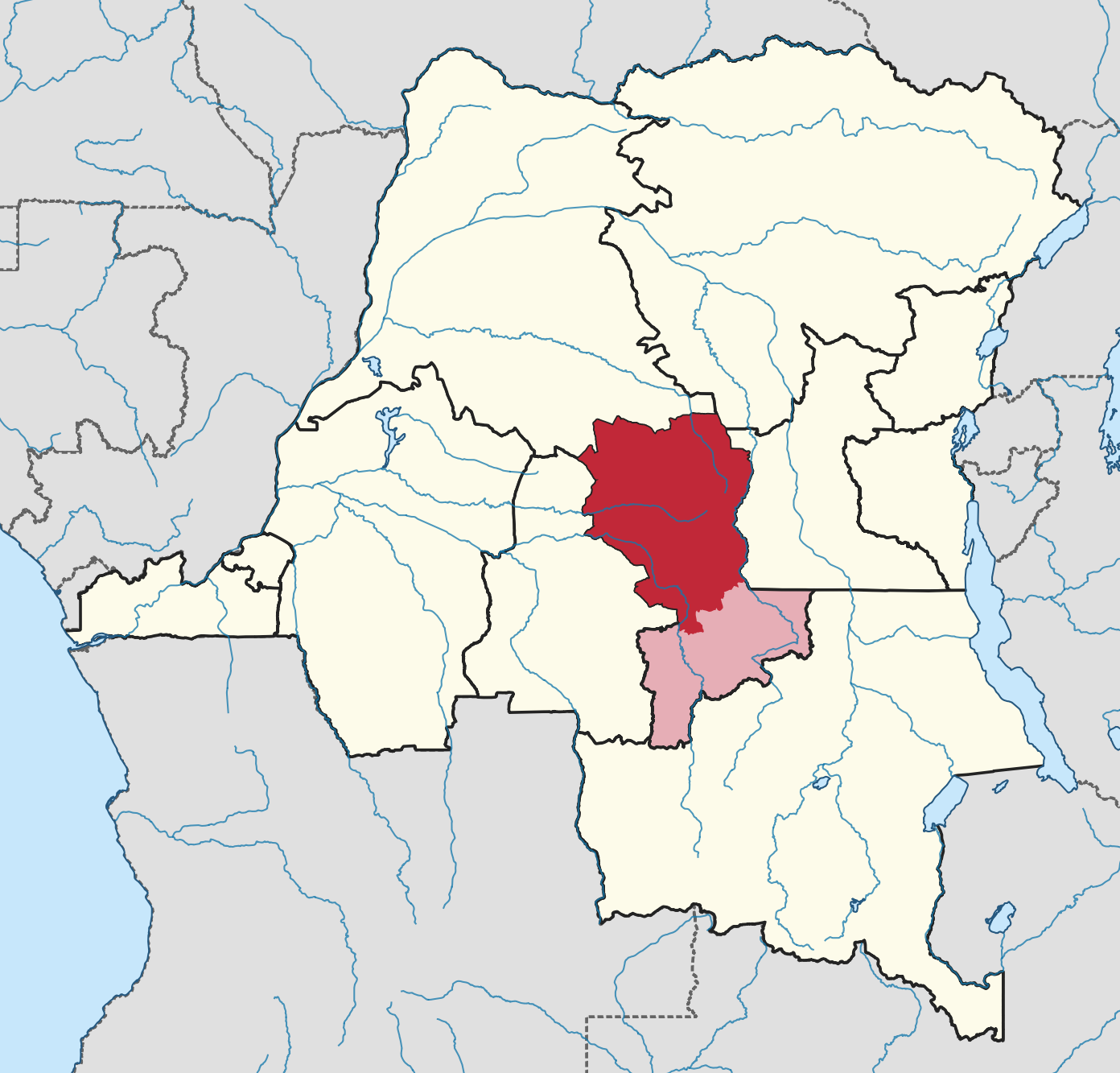
- Sankuru district within Kasai-Oriental province (2014)
- Coordinates: 3.516667°S 23.6°E
- Country: Democratic Republic of the Congo
- Province: Kasaï-Oriental
- District: Sankuru

Sankuru District (French: District du Sankuru, Dutch: District Sankuru) was a district of the Belgian Congo and Democratic Republic of the Congo. Its extent has gone through various changes, but it roughly corresponded to the modern Sankuru Province.

== Location ==
A 1914 map shows Sankuru roughly in the center of the Belgian Congo, bordered by Kasai District and Lac Leopold II District to the west, Équateur District and Aruwimi District to the north, Maniema District in the Orientale Province to the east, and Lomami District in Katanga to the south. Sankuru District covered the upper part of the Lukenie River basin and a section of the Lubilash River, which originates further south in Lomami District.

== Colonial history ==
Between 1910 and 1912 Kasai District was divided into Sankuru District to the northeast and a smaller Kasai District to the southwest. As of 1926 both these districts were in the Congo-Kasaï province.

Towards the end of 1919, many people in western Sankuru District became followers of a fetishist named Ikay, who convinced them he could render the European weapons useless and free the people from the Belgian colonial rule. Ikay's disciples spread the word to more remote areas. In July 1920, the movement expanded greatly towards Équateur District, mostly among the Yongo people, and then among the Tomba-Nongo, Bosongo and Booli peoples. An administrator checking rumors of the subversion was attacked 10 kilometres (6.2 mi) from Ekombe, with several deaths and injuries on both sides. Buildings in Boliko, Ikali and Monjuku were destroyed. The rebellion spread among the Pongo and Batua people. The people of the Lomela River basin left their villages and gathered in a desert location, refusing to obey the Belgians.

Some have said the rebellion was caused by the fetishist Ikay, but another view is that the problem came from the intermediaries of the companies and the administration who organized commerce and collected taxes in each village, and threatened the authority of the local leaders. The intermediaries were sometimes oppressive, threatening the villagers with force unless they worked with copal and abandoned their traditional customs. In 1928 the military showed their strength in the Lomela, Kole and Dimbelenge territories of Sankuru district. In 1931, several villages in the district revolted. The people of Sankuru-Edumba attacked the Forminiere II boat. These disturbances were connected to unrest in the neighboring Lac Leopold II District.

In the reorganization of 1933, Sankuru District was expanded to include the northern part of the Lomami District, and became part of the new Lusambo Province. The southern part of Lomami was merged into the Lualaba District in the Élizabethville Province. In 1932–1934, the military undertook several actions in Lusambo District. In 1936, the authorities were concerned that many talismans and magic utensils with subversive uses were appearing, particularly in the Basongo-Meno region. The military made demonstrations of their force to put a halt to the magic propaganda and force the people back to work.

In 1947, Lusambo Province was renamed to Kasaï. Some districts were broken up. A 1955–1957, map shows that a new Kabinda District had been created from the southeast part of Sankuru. Sankuru District now bordered Tshuapa District to the north, Stanleyville District to the northeast, Maniema District to the east, Kabinda District and Lulua District to the south and Kasai District to the west. The area was now 117,600 square kilometres (45,400 sq mi) out of a total of 323,100 square kilometres (124,700 sq mi) for Kasai province as a whole.

== Post-independence ==
On 14 August 1962 Kasaï was divided into five new provinces: Lomami, Luluabourg, Sankuru, Sud-Kasaï and Unité Kasaïenne. Governors of Sankuru during this first period as a province were:

Start	End	Officeholder	Title
14 September 1962	December 1963	André Diumasumbu	President
1 January 1963	April 1963	Athanase Ndjadi	President (in rebellion)
27 December 1963	June 1965	Paul Marcel Sumbu	President
1 June 1965	27 January 1966	Benoît Wetshindjadi	Governor
18 April 1966	25 April 1966	Étienne Kihuyu	Governor

On 25 April 1966 Luluabourg and Unité Kasaïenne were united to form Kasaï-Occidental, while Lomami, Sankuru, and Sud-Kasaï were united in the new province of Kasaï-Oriental. Kasaï Oriental was split in 2015 into the current, smaller Kasaï-Oriental, Lomami and Sankuru provinces.

== Maps ==
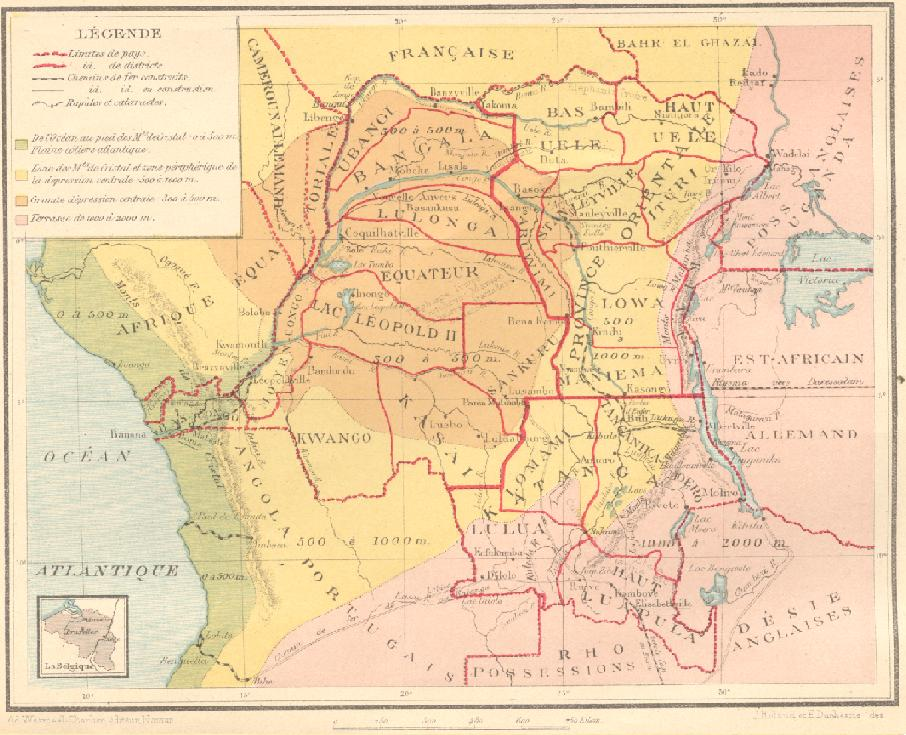
1914 districts

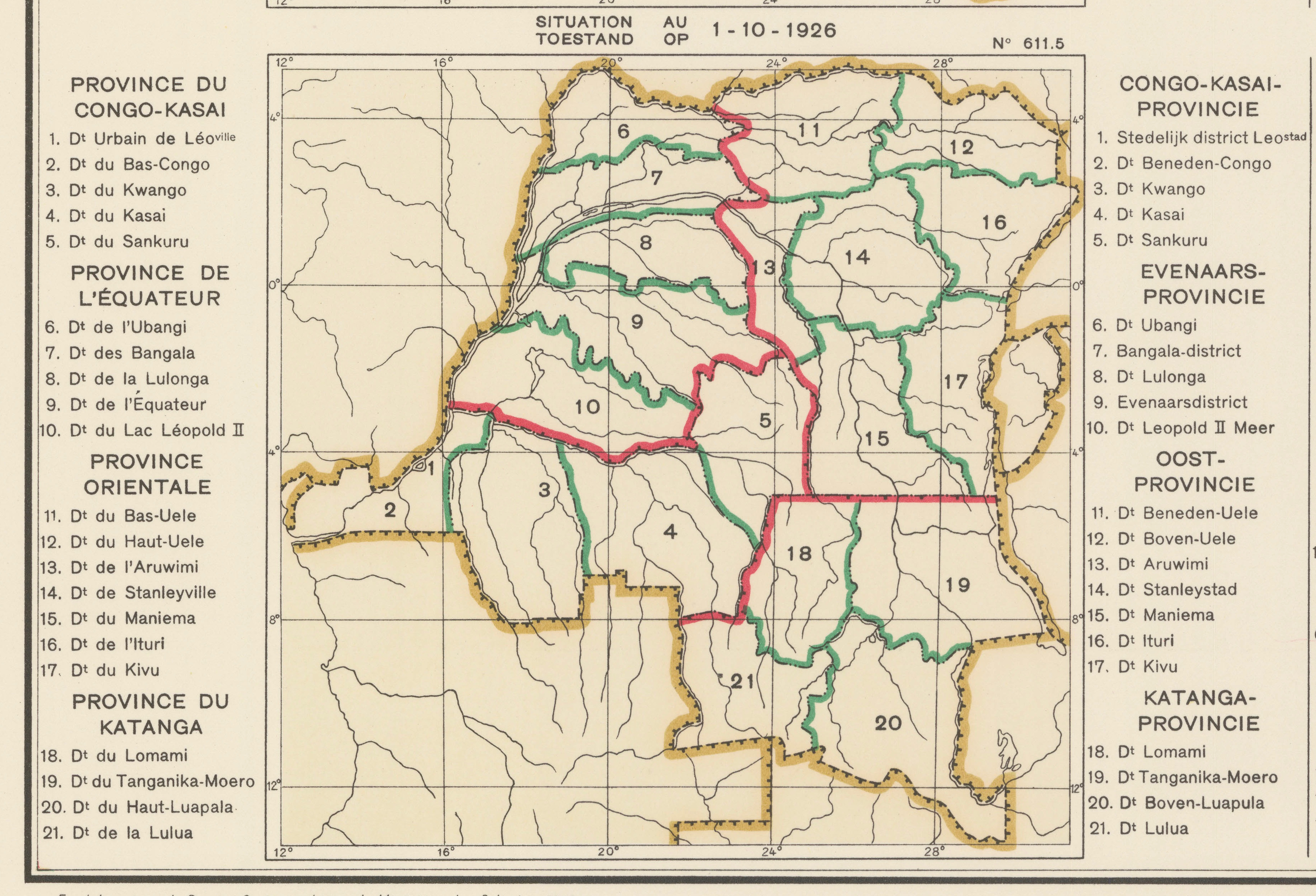
1926 provinces and districts

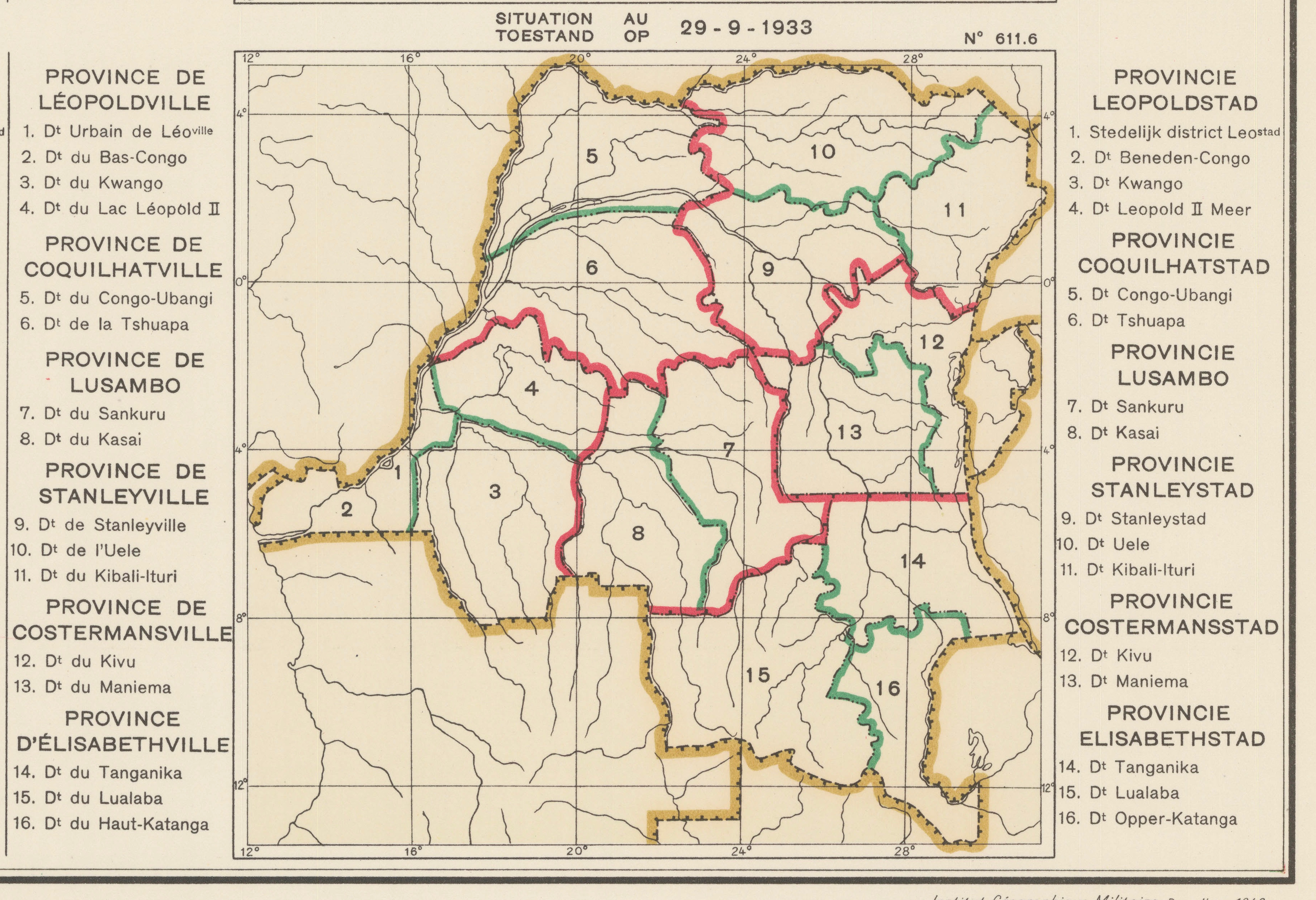
1933 provinces and districts

Sankuru province location today

== See also ==
- Districts of the Belgian Congo
- Districts of the Democratic Republic of the Congo
- Sankuru

== Sources ==
- Atlas général du Congo / Algemene atlas van Congo (in French and Dutch), Belgium: Institut Royal Colonial Belge, 1948–1963, OCLC 681334449 / http://www.kaowarsom.be/en/online_maps Archived 2017-10-13 at the Wayback Machine
- Brass, William (8 December 2015), Demography of Tropical Africa, Princeton University Press, ISBN 978-1-4008-7714-0
- Bruneau, Jean-Claude (30 June 2009), "Les nouvelles provinces de la République Démocratique du Congo : construction territoriale et ethnicités", L'Espace Politique, 7 (2009–1), doi:10.4000/espacepolitique.1296
- "Congo (Kinshasa) Provinces", Rulers.org
- Nollet, Veerle (2003), "Conflict and Subversion in the Central Congo between 1920 and 1940", Annales Aequatoria, 24, Honoré Vinck: 77–96, JSTOR 25836808
- Roland, J.; Duchesne, E. (1914), "Congo Belge, Administrative (1914)", Le Congo Belge, Namur: Wesmael-Charlier
