= Bolobo Territory =

Bolobo
- Territory
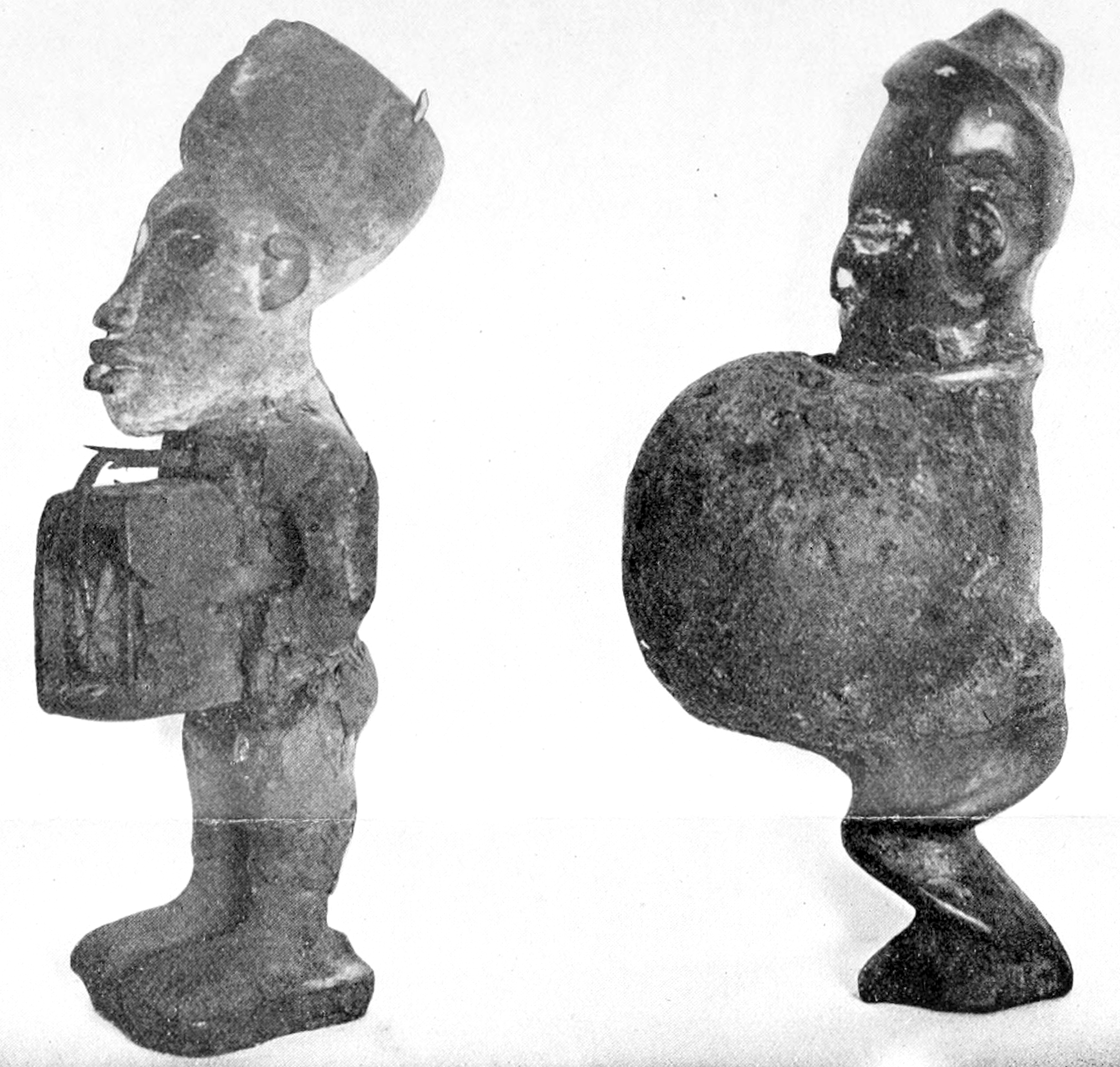
- Fetish Figure from Bolobo, Upper Congo.
- Interactive map of Bolobo
- Coordinates: 2°9′S 16°14′E
- Country: DR Congo
- Province: Mai-Ndombe
- Seat: Bolobo

Area
  - Total: 1,566 sq mi (4,056 km^{2})

Population
  - Total: 121,270
- Time zone: UTC+1 (West Africa Time)
- National language: Lingala

Bolobo Territory is an administrative region of Mai-Ndombe Province of the Democratic Republic of the Congo. The headquarters is the town of Bolobo. The territory lies on the east side of the Congo River, opposite the Republic of the Congo.
