= Feshi Territory =

Coordinates: 6°08′S 18°10′E

Feshi
- Territory
- Interactive map of Feshi
- Country: DR Congo
- Province: Kwango

Area
  - Total: 19,187 km^{2} (7,408 sq mi)

Population (2019)
  - Total: 578,836
  - Density: 30.168/km^{2} (78.135/sq mi)
- Time zone: UTC+1 (WAT)

Feshi is a territory located to the southern west in the Democratic Republic of the Congo. It is located in Kwango province.

== Subdivisions ==
The territory contains the following sectors:

- Feshi Sector
- Ganaketi Sector
- Kobo Sector
- Mukoso Sector
