= Inongo Territory =

Coordinates: 1.95°S 18.27°E

Inongo
- Territory
- Interactive map of Inongo
- Country: DR Congo
- Province: Mai-Ndombe
- Time zone: UTC+1 (WAT)

Inongo Territory is a second-level administrative area (territory) in Maï-Ndombe Province in the Democratic Republic of the Congo. Its headquarters is in the provincial capital of Inongo.

Inongo Territory covers 24,149 km² and is divided into three administrative divisions or "sectors":

- Basengele, with the groupings (groupements) of Bokote, Mbelo, Mpenge, Ngongo;
- Bolia, with the groupings (groupements) of Bokwala, Lokanga, and Nkile (Nkita);
- Inongo, with the groupings (groupements) of Ibenga, Iyembe, and Ntombanzale.
