= Lake Mai-Ndombe =

Lake in the Democratic Republic of the Congo

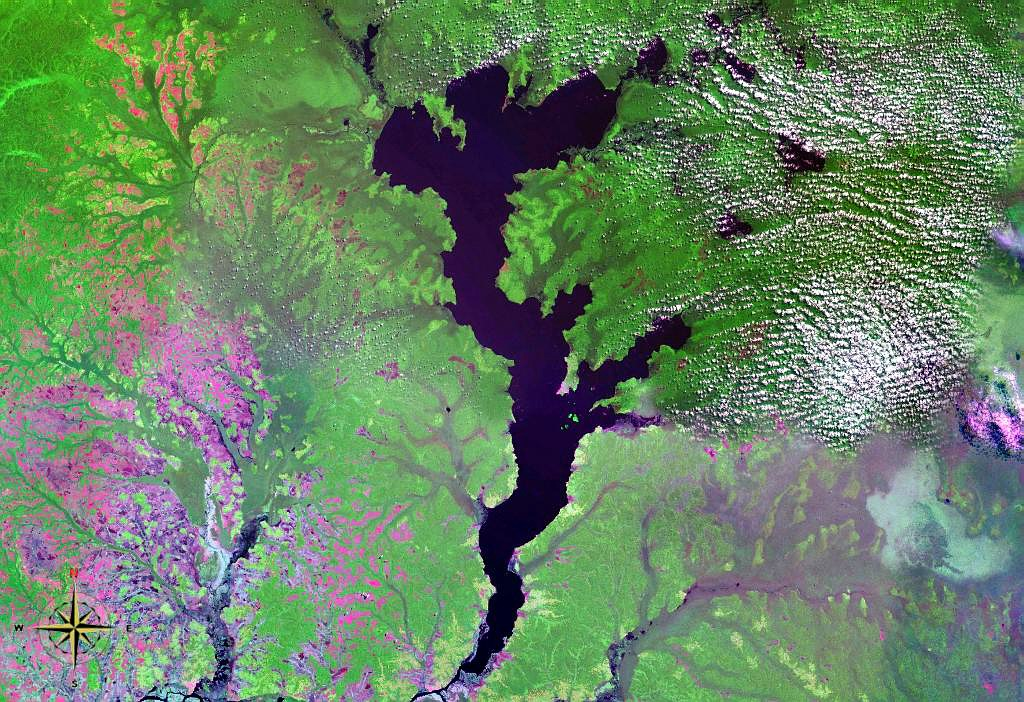
- Seen from space (false color)

- Location within Democratic Republic of the Congo
- Location: Mai-Ndombe Province, DR Congo
- Coordinates: 2°S 18.33°E
- Primary outflows: Fimi River
- Basin countries: DR Congo
- Surface area: 2,300 km^{2} (890 sq mi)
- Average depth: 5 m (16 ft)
- Max. depth: 10 m (33 ft)

Lake Mai-Ndombe and the Fimi River, in red

Lake Mai-Ndombe (French: Lac Mai-Ndombe, Dutch: Mai-Ndombemeer) is a large freshwater lake in Mai-Ndombe province in western Democratic Republic of the Congo. The lake is within the Tumba-Ngiri-Maindombe area, the largest Wetland of International Importance recognized by the Ramsar Convention in the world.

== Location ==
The lake drains to the south through the Fimi River into the Kwah and Congo Rivers. Known until 1972 as Lake Leopold II (French: Lac Léopold II; Dutch: Leopold II-meer) after Leopold II, King of the Belgians. Mai-Ndombe means "black water" in Kikongo. The lake is of irregular shape and ranges in depth from only 5 meters (mean) to 10 meters (maximum). Covering approximately 890 square miles (2,300 square km), it is known to double or triple in size during the rainy season. Its waters are oxygenated throughout their depth and the pH ranges from 4.2 to 5.5. Low, forested shores surround it with dense, humid equatorial rainforest prevailing to the north and a mosaic of forest and savanna to the south.

== Biodiversity ==
Surveys have revealed a high biodiversity in and around the lake, with animals such as two species of otters, marsh mongoose, giant otter shrew, numerous waterbirds, crocodiles and turtles.

Mai-Ndombe contains acidic, humic-rich blackwater and in general the fish of this lake have been poorly documented, even compared to other regions in the Congo River basin. Although ecologically similar to Lake Tumba and occasionally directly connected by channels or swamps, there are some significant differences in the fish fauna that inhabits the two lakes, but also many shared species. Initial surveys were performed by George Albert Boulenger more than a century ago and there have been relatively few later studies of the fish fauna in the lake. For example, the first study of its northern part was only conducted in 2002. More than 30 fish species are known, but the actual figure is presumed to be considerably higher. There are five known endemics: the catfish Amphilius opisthophthalmus and the cichlid Hemichromis cerasogaster were scientifically described by Boulenger. The remaining are relatively recent discoveries that only were described in the last few decades: In 1984, a new species of cichlid, Nanochromis transvestitus, named for the fact that it exhibits reverse sexual dichromatism, was scientifically described from the lake. In 2006, another new species of cichlid, Nanochromis wickleri, was described, and in 2008, a new catfish species, Chrysichthys praecox, was documented.

== Economic activity ==
Some of the main concession areas of the logging company Sodefor are to the north and south of Lake Mai-Ndombe. On 28 November 2009, two logging barges sank causing the loss of 73 lives. The boat was not authorised to carry passengers, but was believed to have some 270 people on board at the time.

Lake Mai-Ndombe and the river system is often used for transportation across the country because the land based road system is inadequate. Many passenger ferries carry hundreds of people each day. Many of these boats are old and not maintained. On Saturday, May 25, 2019, a passenger ferry with over 350 passengers sank in high winds. Over 45 passengers were confirmed dead in the first day and over a hundred deemed still missing. In response the government said it would ban wooden passenger boats over 5 years old from traversing the lake.

== Bibliography ==
- Mapping the vegetation cover of the Mai-Ndombe region (Democratic Republic of the Congo). Regional School of Integrated Forest and Land Management. University of Kinshasa, July 2003
- Source book for the inland fishery resources of Africa, Vol. 1. J.-P. Vanden Bossche & G.M. Bernacsek ISBN 92-5-102983-0
