= Mai-Ndombe Province =

Province of the Democratic Republic of the Congo

Mai-Ndombe Province du Mai-Ndombe (French)
- Province
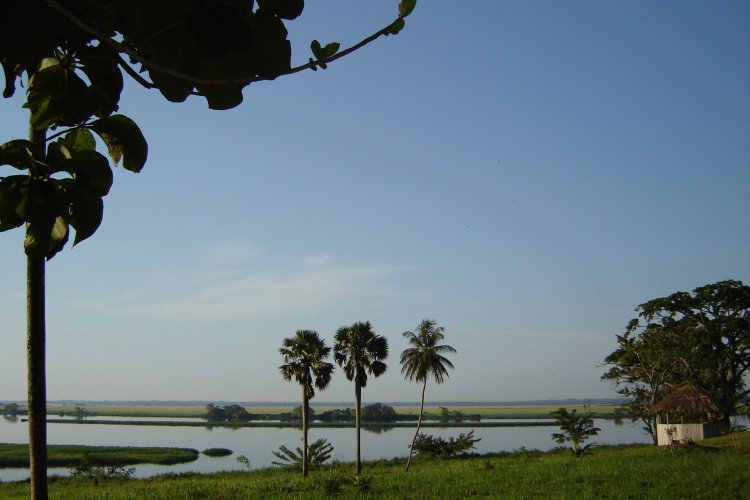
- Lake Maï Ndombe

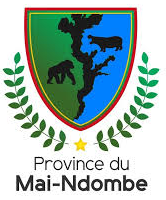
- Seal

- Coordinates: 01°57′S 18°16′E
- Country: DR Congo
- Established: 2015
- Named for: Lake Maï Ndombe
- Capital: Inongo

Government
  - Governor: Lebon Nkoso Kevani

Area
  - Total: 127,465 km^{2} (49,215 sq mi)

Population (2024 est.)
  - Total: 2,291,000
  - Density: 17.97/km^{2} (46.55/sq mi)

Ethnic groups
  - Native: Bateke • Anamongo • Batwa • Basakata • Baboma • Bayanzi • Basengele • Babolia
- Time zone: UTC+1 (WAT)
- ISO 3166 code: CD-MN
- License Plate Code: (Democratic Republic of the Congo) CGO / 16
- Official language: French

Mai-Ndombe is one of the 21 newest provinces of the Democratic Republic of the Congo created in the 2015 repartitioning when the former Bandundu province was split-up into the new provinces of Mai-Ndombe, Kwango, and Kwilu. Mai-Ndombe was formed from the Plateaux and Mai-Ndombe districts, with the town of Inongo being elevated to the capital city of the new province.

The 2024 population was estimated to be 2,291,000.

== Geography ==
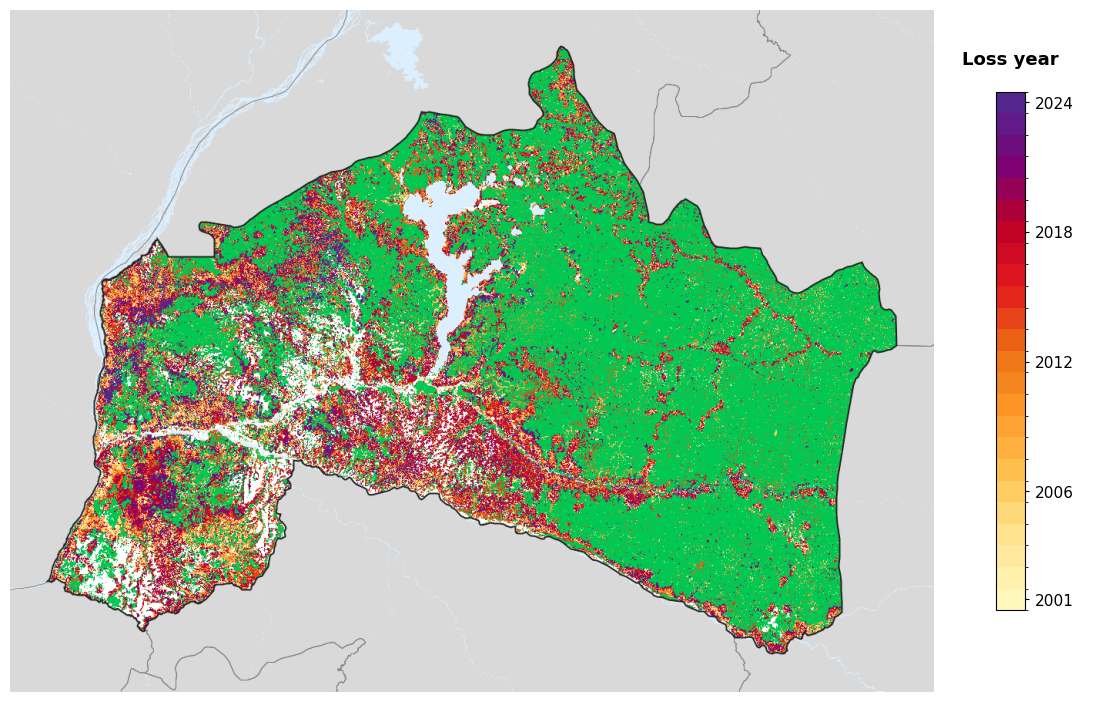
Tree-cover loss year in Mai-Ndombe, 2001-2024, from the Global Forest Change dataset.

Mai-Ndombe is located in the western Democratic Republic of the Congo. It has an international border with the Republic of the Congo to the west, and borders with several other provinces: Équateur and Tshuapa to the north, Kasaï to the east, and Kwilu and Kinshasa to the south. Most of the province has a tropical savanna climate by the Köppen-Geiger climate classification, except for the northeast, which has areas with a tropical monsoon climate or a tropical rainforest climate.

== Administrative divisions ==
The province is divided in to eight territories and one independently administered city.

Administrative division	Type	Map
Inongo	City	Inongo
Bolobo	Territory	Bolobo
Inongo	Territory	Inongo
Kiri	Territory	Kiri
Kutu	Territory	Kutu
Kwamouth	Territory	Kwamouth
Mushie	Territory	Mushie
Oshwe	Territory	Oshwe
Yumbi	Territory	Yumbi

== History ==
Mai-Ndombe Province was a separate province from 1962 to 1966, prior the creation of Bandundu Province from the post-colonial political regions of Kwango, Kwilu, and Mai-Ndombe. Presidents (from 1965, governors) were:

- 8 Sep 1962 – Dec 1963 Victor Kumoriko
- 23 Sep 1963 – 11 Oct 1963 V. Bola (in rebellion)
- Jan 1964 – Dec 1964 Gabriël Zangabie
  - 1964 – 1965 ...
- 27 Jul 1965 – 25 Apr 1966 Daniël Mongiya

A large river boat sank in the province in 2021, killing at least 60 people.
