= Tshuapa District =

- District
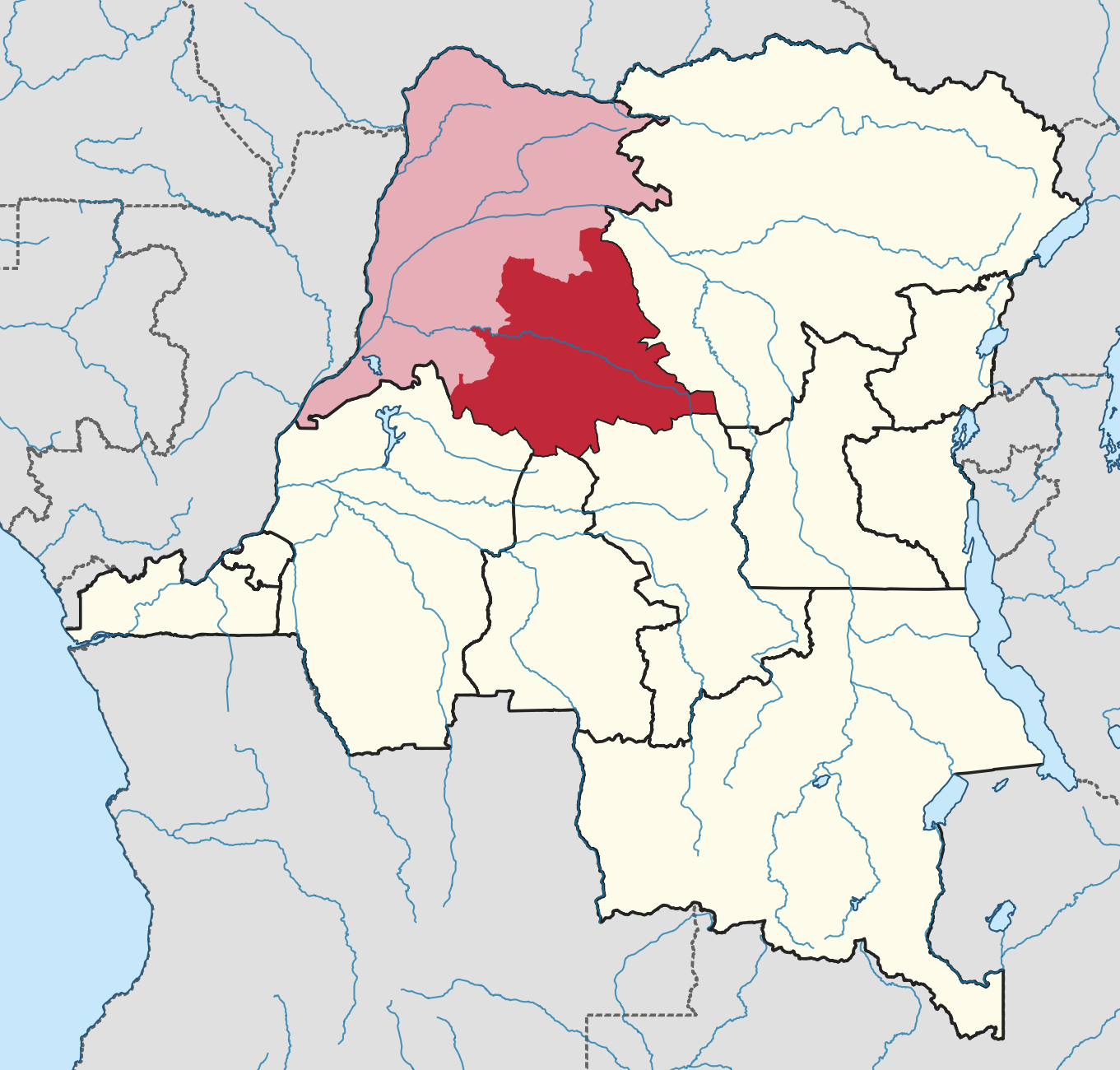
- Tshuapa district of Equateur province (2014)
- Coordinates: 0.733333°S 19.2°E
- Country: Democratic Republic of the Congo
- Province: Équateur
- District: Tshuapa

Tshuapa District (French: District de la Tshuapa, Dutch: District Tshuapa), was a district of the Belgian Congo and the Democratic Republic of the Congo created in 1933 in the Coquilhatville Province. At its greatest extent it roughly corresponded to the present provinces of Équateur and Tshuapa.

== Location ==
The original four provinces of the Belgian Congo had considerable autonomy, but in 1933 they were reorganized into six provinces, named after their capitals, and the central government assumed more control. The former Équateur Province was renamed Coquilhatville Province after the capital city of Coquilhatville. A map of the 1933 administrative divisions shows Bangala District and Ubangi District had been merged to form Congo-Ubangi District in the north. In the south, the districts of Lulonga and Équateur had been combined to form Tshuapa District.

Tshuapa District bordered the French possessions across the Congo River to the west, Congo-Ubangi District to the north, Stanleyville District to the east, and Sankuru, Kasai and Lac Léopold II districts to the south. The district was named after the Tshuapa River, which flowed westward through it to the Congo River.

Coquilhatville Province was renamed Équateur Province in 1947. By 1954 it had again been divided into Equateur, a smaller Tshuapa, Mongala and Ubangi districts. A 1955-1957 map shows Tshuapa District bounded by Mongala District to the north, Stanleyville District to the east, Sankuru, Kasai and Lac Léopold II districts to the south and Équateur District to the west. It covered the same territory as the modern province of Tshuapa. The area was 133,000 square kilometres (51,000 sq mi) out of a total of 402,100 square kilometres (155,300 sq mi) for Equateur province as a whole.

On 14 August 1962 the new provinces of Cuvette Centrale (Equateur and Tshuapa) and Ubangi were split off from Équateur Province, and the remainder of the province was placed under central administration, to become the province of Moyen-Congo (Mongala) on 5 February 1963. On 25 April 1966 Cuvette Centrale, Moyen-Congo, and Ubangi were reunited in a new Équateur province. On 11 July 2015 Équateur was split into a smaller Équateur province and the new provinces of Tshuapa, Mongala, Nord-Ubangi and Sud-Ubangi. Tshuapa Province was formed from the Tshuapa district, whose town of Boende was elevated to capital city of the new province.

== Maps ==
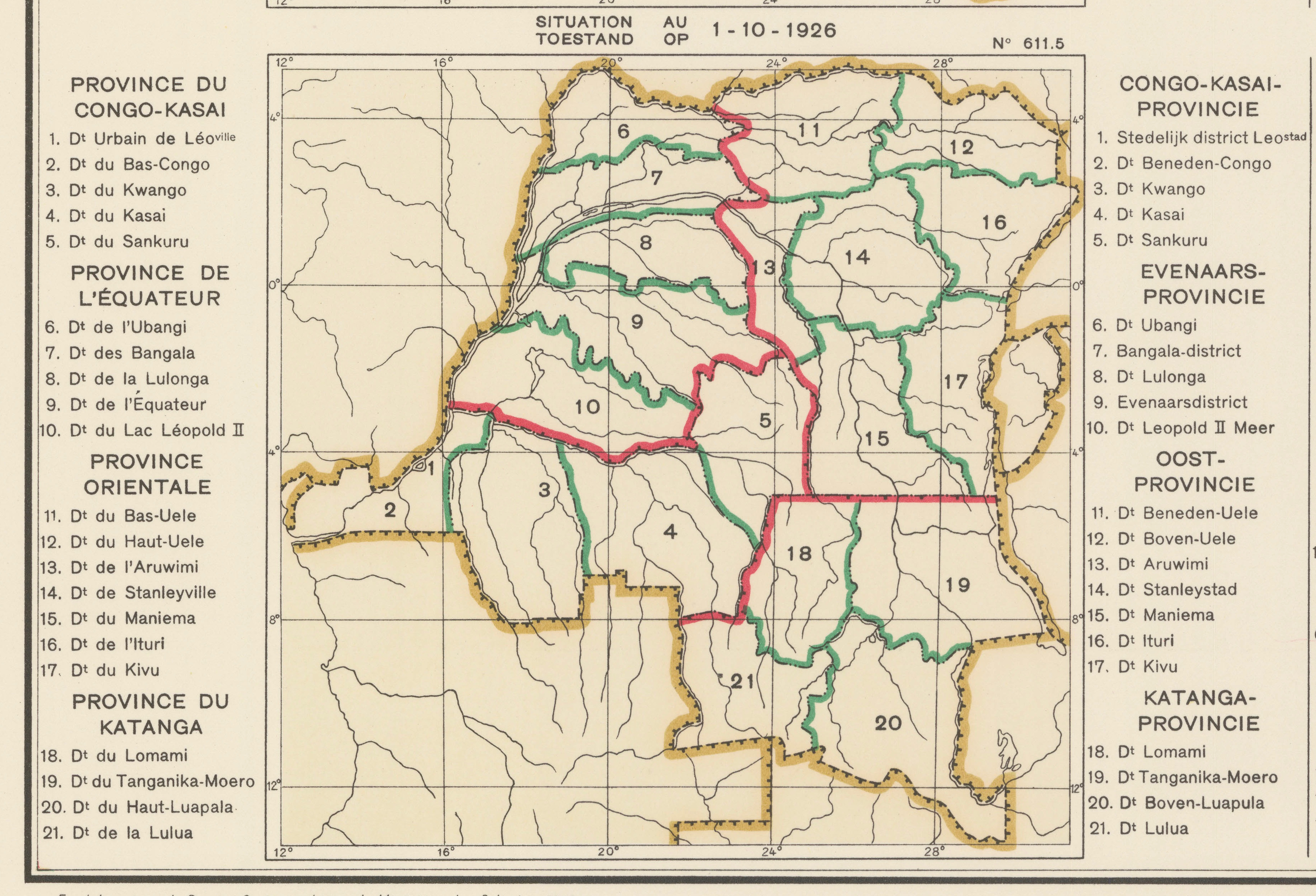
1926 provinces and districts

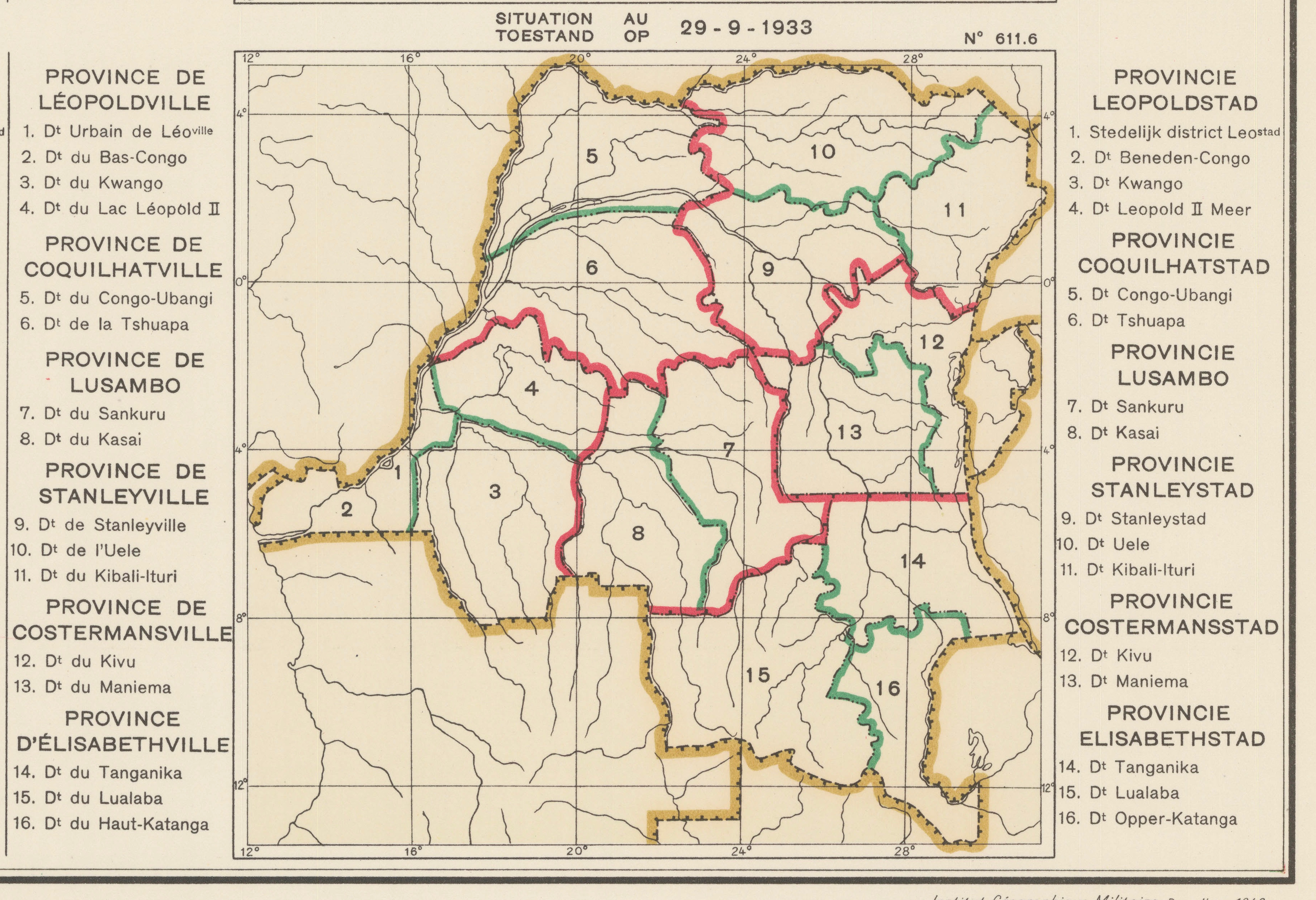
1933 provinces and districts. Lulonga and Équateur combined to form Tshuapa District

The present Équateur province

The present Tshuapa province

== See also ==
- Districts of the Belgian Congo
- Districts of the Democratic Republic of the Congo

== Sources ==
- Atlas général du Congo / Algemene atlas van Congo (in French and Dutch), Belgium: Institut Royal Colonial Belge, 1948–1963, OCLC 681334449
- Brass, William (8 December 2015), Demography of Tropical Africa, Princeton University Press, ISBN 978-1-4008-7714-0
- Bruneau, Jean-Claude (30 June 2009), "Les nouvelles provinces de la République Démocratique du Congo : construction territoriale et ethnicités", L'Espace Politique, 7 (2009–1), doi:10.4000/espacepolitique.1296
- "Congo (Kinshasa) Provinces", Rulers.org
- "Provinces of the Democratic Republic of Congo". Statiods.com.
