= Bangala District =

Former district in Orientale, Belgian Congo

- District
- Location within Democratic Republic of the Congo
- Coordinates: 2.148611°N 21.513611°E
- Country: Belgian Congo
- Province: Orientale
- District: Bangala

Bangala District (French: District des Bangala, Dutch: Bangala-district) was a district of the Congo Free State and the Belgian Congo. It went through various significant changes in extent. The eastern part very roughly corresponded to the present province of Mongala.

== Location ==
A decree of 3 September 1886 by the Congo Free State administrator general Camille Janssen defined nine districts in the colony, each headed by a district commissioner. Bangala District was one of the districts named. The name comes from the Bangala language, the lingua-franca of the northeast Congo region. (Note: Bangala means "people of Mongala", or people who live along the Mongala River, a right tributary of the Congo that defines the western border of the Mongala District.) A decree of 1 August 1888 divided the Congo Free State into eleven districts, of which the first five were in the lower Congo region. Bangala District had been replaced by Ubangi-Uélé District. In 1895 the number of the districts was increased to fifteen, including Bangala District and Ubangi District.

A map of the Congo Free State in 1897 shows the Bangalas district extending along both sides of the northwest section Congo River from Lake Tumba upstream to where the Itimbiri River enters from the north. It is bounded to the northwest by the Ubangi District, to the east by the Uellé District and Aruwimi District, and to the south by the Équateur District. Bangala District is shown on maps of 1910, 1912 and 1926 with somewhat different boundaries on each map. Équateur Province was created in 1917. As of 1926 the province included the districts of Ubangi, Bangala, Lulonga, Équateur and Lac Léopold II. With the reorganization of 1933, Ubangi District and Bangala District were combined to form Congo-Ubangi District, the northern part of Coquilhatville Province. Coquilhatville Province was renamed Équateur Province in 1947.

== Post-independence ==
On 14 August 1962 Cuvette Centrale Province and Ubangi Province were separated from Équateur Province, and on 5 February 1963 the remainder became Moyen-Congo Province. These three provinces were combined into a new Équateur Province on 25 April 1966. On 11 July 2015 Équateur was split into the present provinces of Équateur, Mongala, Nord-Ubangi, Sud-Ubangi and Tshuapa. Mongala very roughly corresponds to the eastern part of the former Bangala District.

== Maps ==
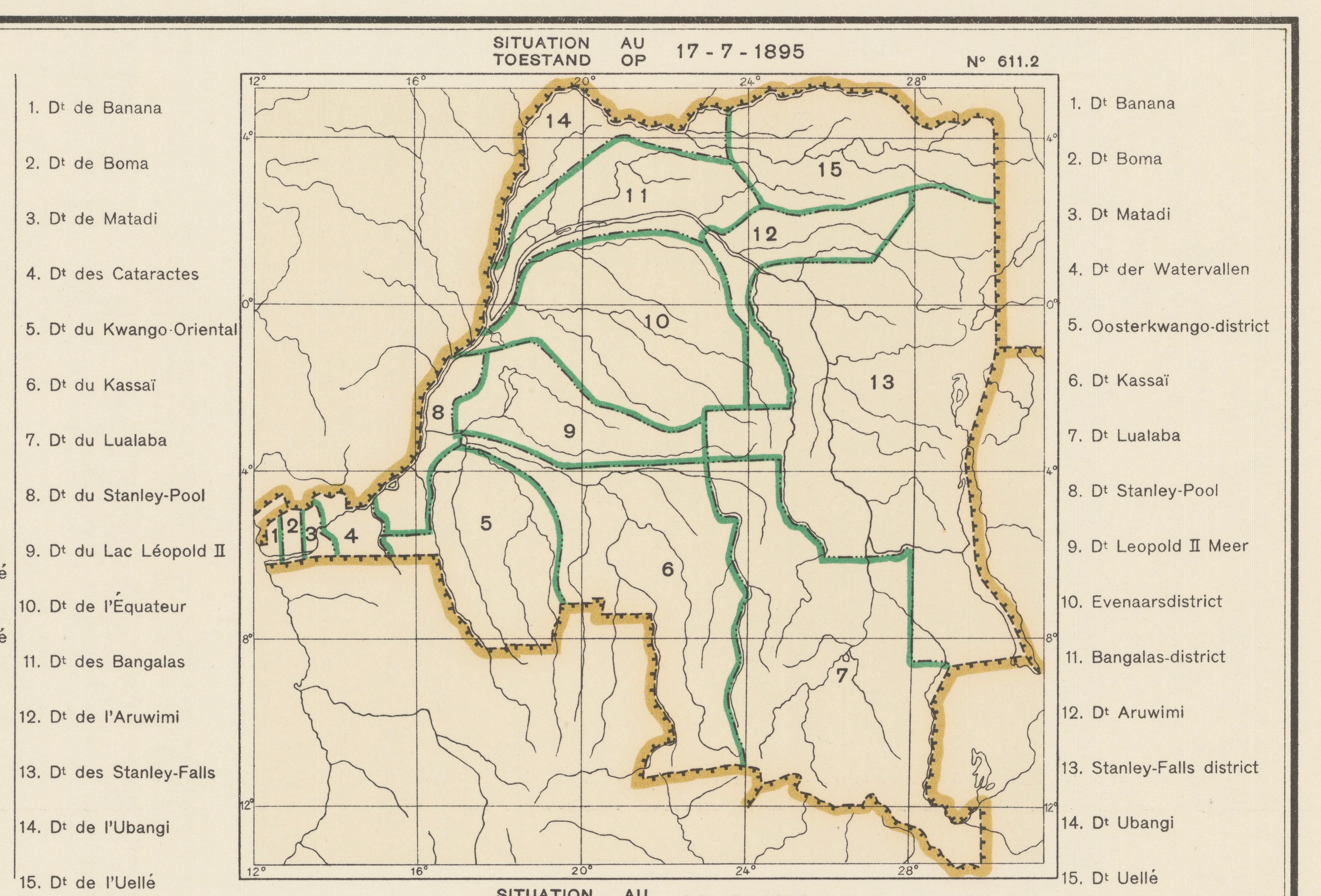
Districts of the Congo Free State in 1895

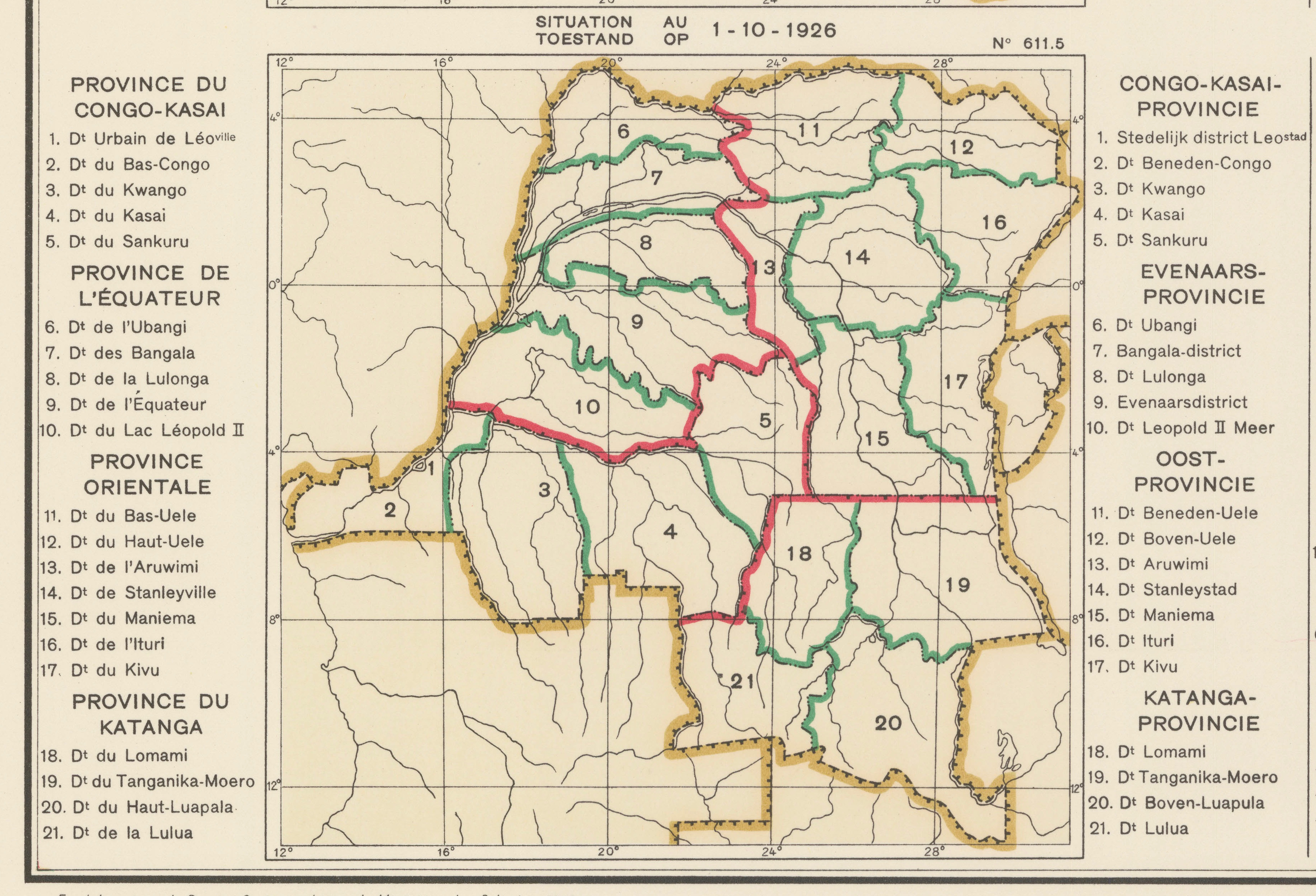
1926 provinces and districts

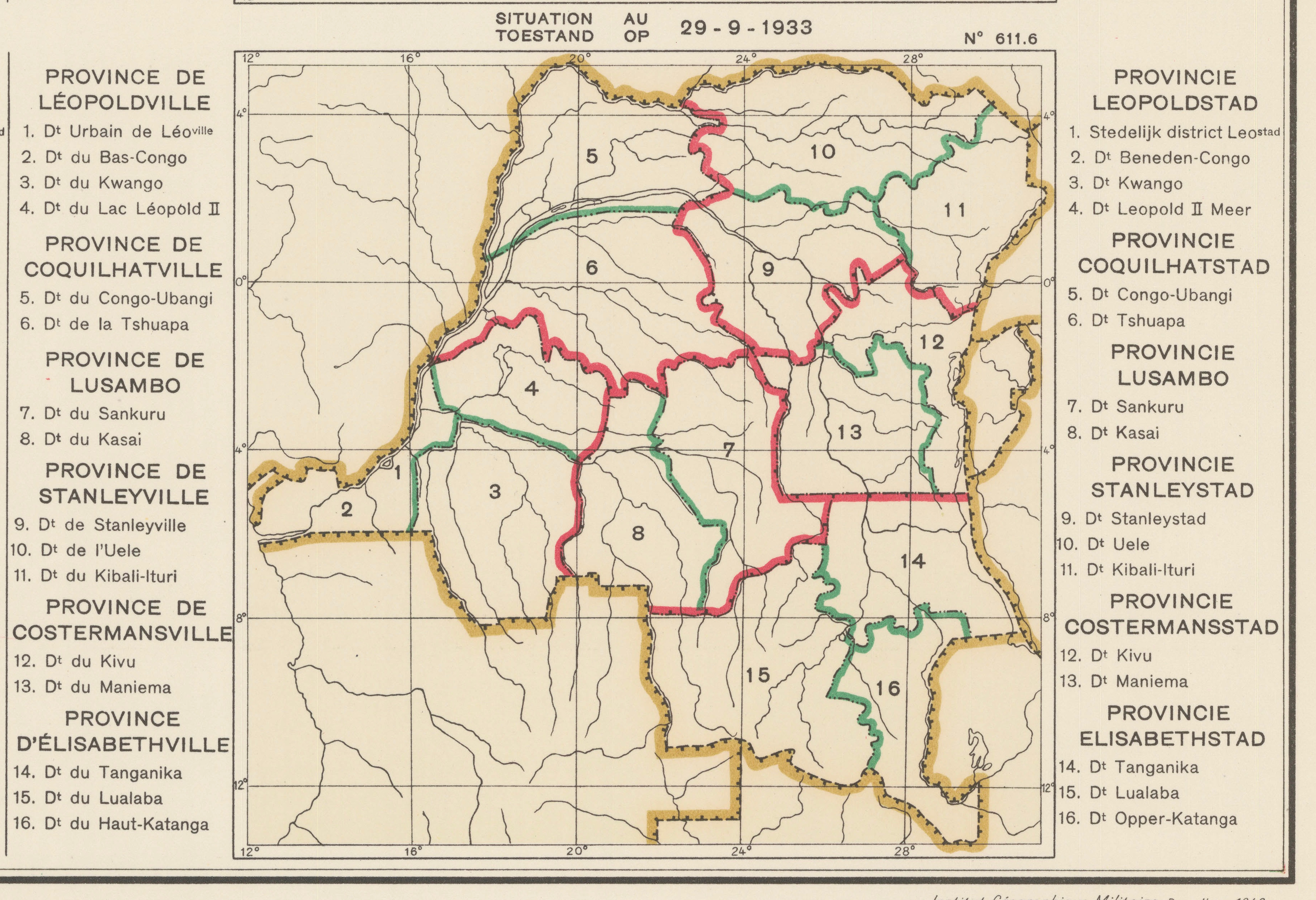
1933 provinces and districts

The present Mongala Province

== See also ==
- Districts of the Congo Free State
- Districts of the Belgian Congo
- Districts of the Democratic Republic of the Congo

== Sources ==
- Atlas général du Congo / Algemene atlas van Congo (in French and Dutch), Belgium: Institut Royal Colonial Belge, 1948–1963, OCLC 681334449 / http://www.kaowarsom.be/en/online_maps Archived 2017-10-13 at the Wayback Machine
- "Congo (Kinshasa) Provinces", Rulers.org
- Etat Indépendant du Congo (1886), Bulletin Officiel (PDF)
- Hammarström, Harald; Forkel, Robert; Haspelmath, Martin, eds. (2017), "Bangala", Glottolog 3.0, Jena, Germany: Max Planck Institute for the Science of Human History
- Omasombo Tshonda, Jean (2014), Bas-Uele, Musée royal de l’Afrique centrale, ISBN 978-9-4916-1586-3
- Omasombo Tshonda, Jean (2015), Mongala : Jonction des territoires et bastion d'une identité supra-ethnique (PDF), Musée royal de l’Afrique centrale, ISBN 978-9-4922-4416-1
- Roland, J.; Duchesne, E. (1914), "Congo Belge, Administrative (1914)", Le Congo Belge, Namur: Wesmael-Charlier
