= Ubangi District =

- District
- Location within Democratic Republic of the Congo
- Coordinates: 4.786431°N 19.441837°E
- Country: Belgian Congo
- Province: Équateur
- District: Ubangi

Ubangi District (French: District de l'Ubangi, Dutch: District Ubangi) was a district of the Congo Free State, Belgian Congo and Democratic Republic of the Congo. It went through various significant changes in extent.

== Congo Free State ==
A decree of 1 August 1888 divided the Congo Free State into eleven districts, of which the first five were in the lower Congo region: Ubangi-Uélé District had its capital at Nouvelle Anvers. In 1895 the number of the districts was increased to fifteen, including Ubangi District and Uele District. An 1897 map of the Congo Free State showed Ubangi District as a long strip along the northwest border of the colony, on the left bank of the Ubangi River, which defined the border down to its confluence with the Congo River. Bangalas District was to the south and Uelé District was to the east.

In 1892 King Leopold II of Belgium declared that the Ubangi River basin and other parts of the Congo Free Statey were private domains of the state, although exploitation of rubber in parts of these domains by specific companies was allowed. Reports of missionaries show that working conditions imposed on the populations by the rubber companies was harsh and almost inhuman. Lieutenant Louis Royaux was appointed to the Ubangi District in April 1896, responsible for exploiting rubber in the district. He reached Ubangi in April 1897, and first had to reoccupy the Imesse post in south Ubangi, and build a station on the site of the former village of Libenge, which would become the district capital. Royaux reached Banzyville territory in December 1898, but before starting rubber production had to recruit as many men as possible to fight the Batetela in Uele, who had been in rebellion since 1897.

Royaux spent 1900 teaching each village about rubber harvesting, despite the insistence of the Ngbandi that there were no lianas and rubber trees in their forests. It turned out that the region was indeed poor in rubber, requiring villagers to cover long distances to places where rubber could be harvested. A skilled worker could collect perhaps 10 kilograms (22 lb) of rubber in a month. In a series of atrocities, police detachments killed many villagers who had revolted, or had failed to meet their quotas. Many people fled across the river to French territory, and did not return. Those who remained were vulnerable to sickness and were impoverished since the men did not have time to work the fields, and the soldiers freely looted livestock from the villages. The traditional power structure was shaken up as village chiefs were killed or fled.

== Belgian Congo ==
Ubangi District is shown on maps of 1910, 1912 and 1926 with somewhat different boundaries on each map. Équateur Province was created in 1917. As of 1926 the province included the districts of Ubangi, Bangala, Lulonga, Équateur and Lac Léopold II. With the reorganization of 1933, Ubangi District and Bangala District had been combined to form Congo-Ubangi District, the northern part of Coquilhatville Province.

Coquilhatville Province was renamed Équateur Province in 1947. There were further changes to boundaries. A 1955-1957 map shows Ubangi District bounded by French territory to the west and north, Mongala District to the east and Équateur District to the south. Ubangi district roughly corresponded to the present Sud-Ubangi province and the western part of Nord-Ubangi province. The area was 64,900 square kilometres (25,100 sq mi) out of a total of 402,100 square kilometres (155,300 sq mi) for Equateur province as a whole.

== Post-independence ==
On 14 August 1962 Cuvette Centrale Province and Ubangi Province were separated from Équateur Province, and on 5 February 1963 the remainder became Moyen-Congo Province. These three provinces were combined into a new Équateur Province on 25 April 1966. On 11 July 2015 Équateur was split into the present provinces of Équateur, Mongala, Nord-Ubangi, Sud-Ubangi and Tshuapa. The former Ubangi District is divided between Nord-Ubangi and Sud-Ubangi, which also contain part of the former Bangala District.

== Maps ==
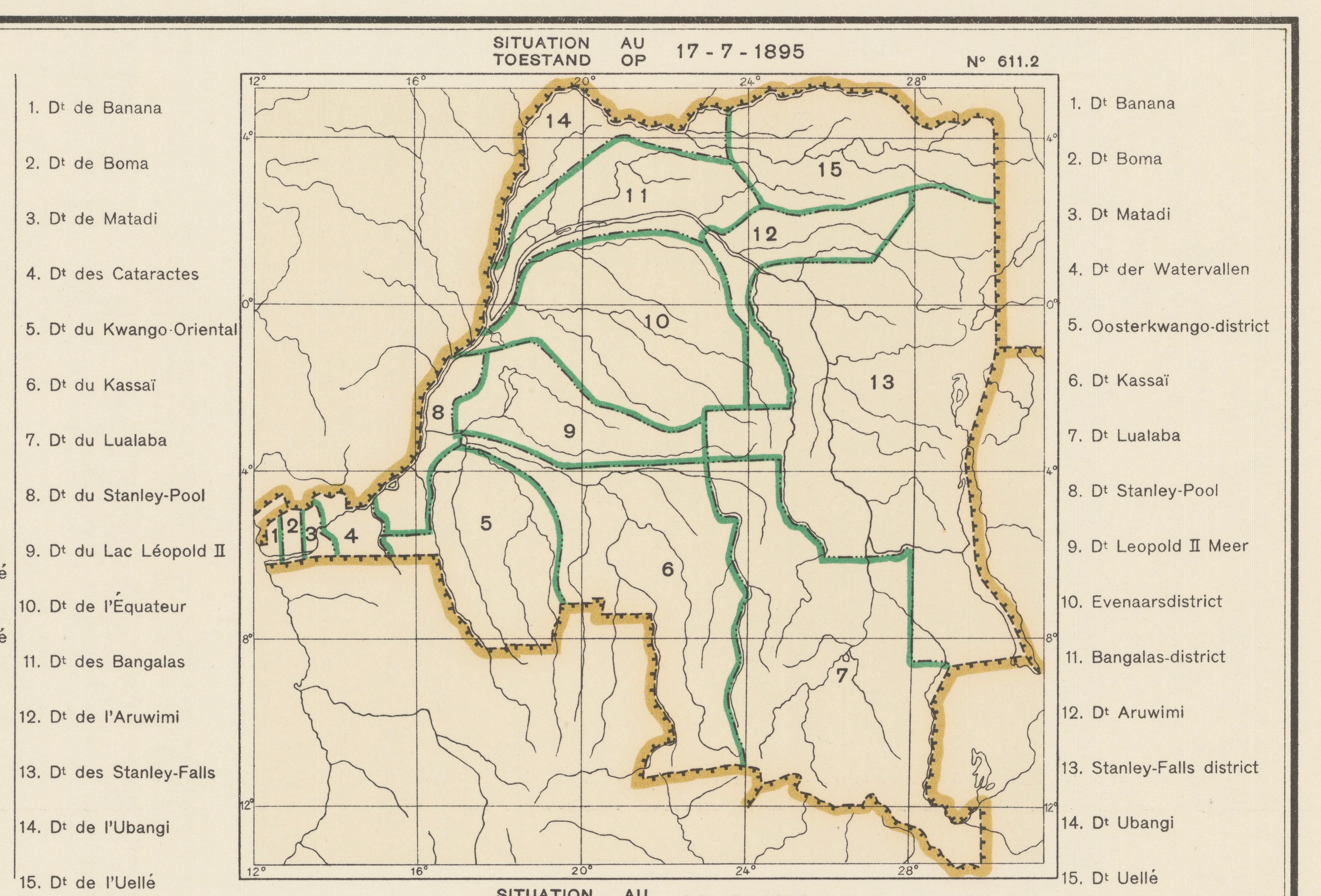
Districts of the Congo Free State in 1895

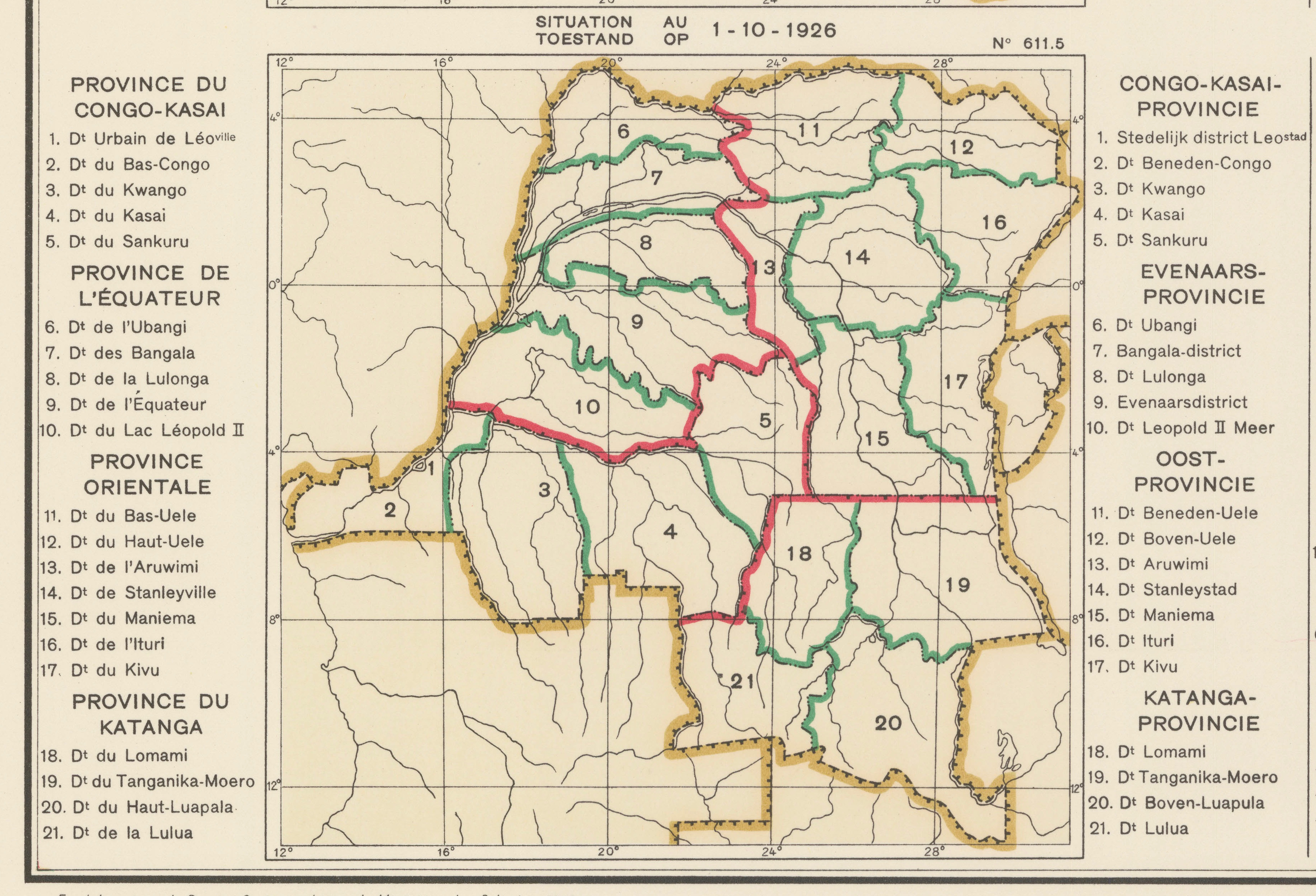
1926 provinces and districts

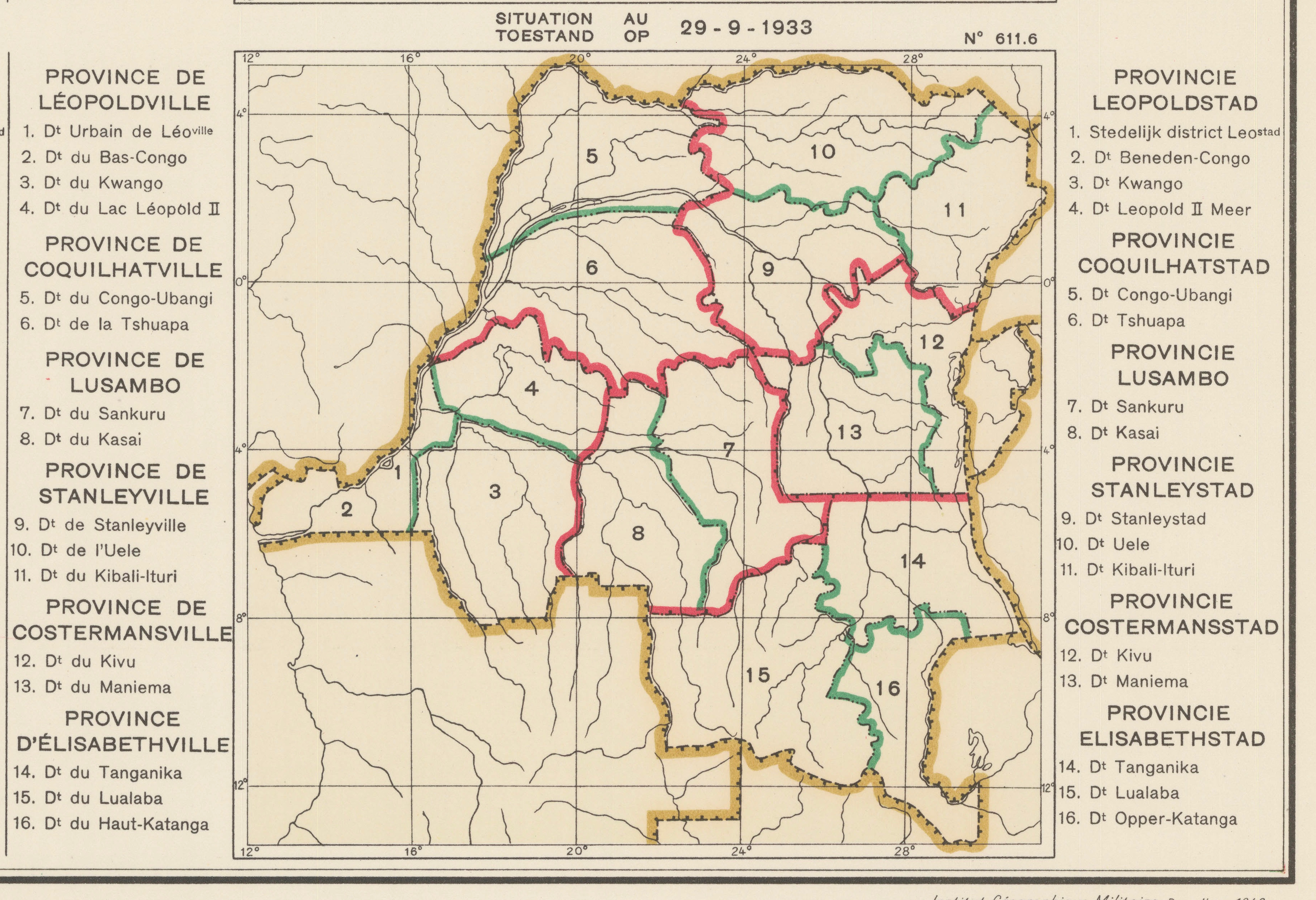
1933 provinces and districts

The current Sud-Ubangi province

The current Nord-Ubangi province

== See also ==
- Districts of the Congo Free State
- Districts of the Belgian Congo
- Districts of the Democratic Republic of the Congo

== Sources ==
- Atlas général du Congo / Algemene atlas van Congo (in French and Dutch), Belgium: Institut Royal Colonial Belge, 1948–1963, OCLC 681334449 / http://www.kaowarsom.be/en/online_maps Archived 2017-10-13 at the Wayback Machine
- Brass, William (8 December 2015), Demography of Tropical Africa, Princeton University Press, ISBN 978-1-4008-7714-0
- "Congo (Kinshasa) Provinces", Rulers.org
- Omasombo Tshonda, Jean (2014), Bas-Uele, Musée royal de l’Afrique centrale, ISBN 978-9-4916-1586-3
- Omasombo Tshonda, Jean (2015), Mongala : Jonction des territoires et bastion d'une identité supra-ethnique (PDF), Musée royal de l’Afrique centrale, ISBN 978-9-4922-4416-1
- Roland, J.; Duchesne, E. (1914), "Congo Belge, Administrative (1914)", Le Congo Belge, Namur: Wesmael-Charlier
- Te Mobusa Ngbwapkwa (1993), "L'exploitation du caoutchouc par l'état indépendant du Congo dans le territoire de Banzyville, district de l'Ubangi (1900-1908)", Civilizations (41): 291–306, doi:10.4000/civilisations.1713
