= Mongala District =

- District
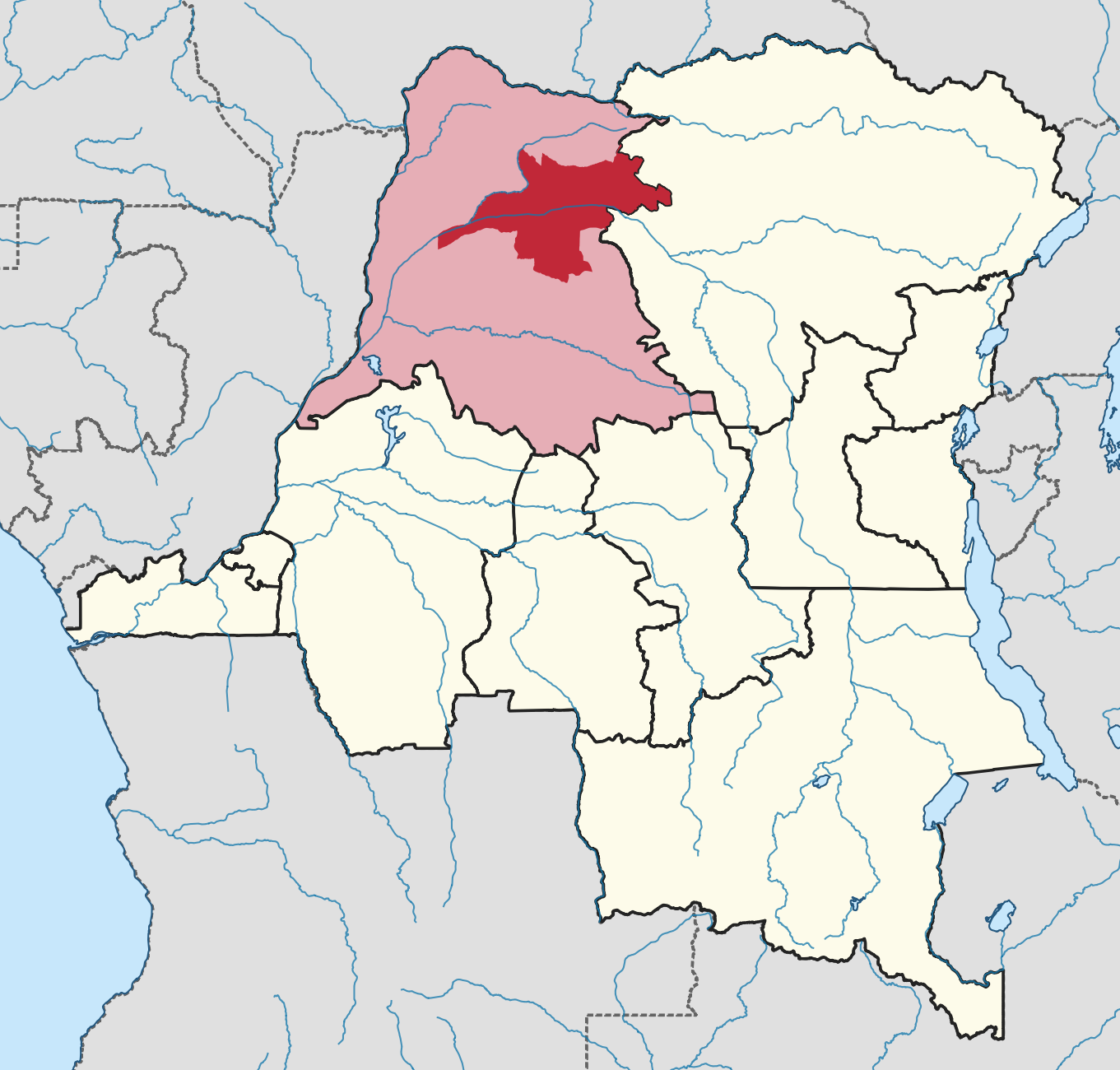
- Mongala district of Equateur province (2014)
- Coordinates: 2.15°N 21.516667°E
- Country: Democratic Republic of the Congo
- Province: Équateur
- District: Mongala

Mongala District (French: District du Mongala, Dutch: District Mongala) was a district of the Belgian Congo and the Democratic Republic of the Congo. It went through various changes in extent. It covered roughly the same area as the present Mongala province and most of Nord-Ubangi province.

== Location ==
In 1933 the original four provinces of the Belgian Congo were reorganized into six provinces, named after their capitals, and the central government assumed more control. Équateur Province became Coquilhatville, with its districts reducing to 15. Ubangi District and Bangala District were combined to form Congo-Ubangi District, the northern part of Coquilhatville Province. Coquilhatville Province was renamed Équateur Province in 1947.

By 1954 Congo-Ubangi District had been divided into Ubangi District to the west and Mongala District to the east. A 1955-1957 map shows Mongala District bordered by French territories to the north, Bas-Uele District to the east, Stanleyville District to the southeast, Tshuapa District to the south, Équateur District to the southwest and Ubangi District to the west. The area was 101,500 square kilometres (39,200 sq mi) out of a total of 402,100 square kilometres (155,300 sq mi) for Equateur province as a whole. It roughly corresponded to the present Mongala Province and the east and central parts of the present Nord-Ubangi Province.

== Post-independence ==
On 14 August 1962 Cuvette Centrale Province and Ubangi Province were separated from Équateur Province, and on 5 February 1963 the remainder became Moyen-Congo Province. These three provinces were combined into a new Équateur Province on 25 April 1966. On 11 July 2015 Équateur was split into the present provinces of Équateur, Mongala, Nord-Ubangi, Sud-Ubangi and Tshuapa.

== Maps ==
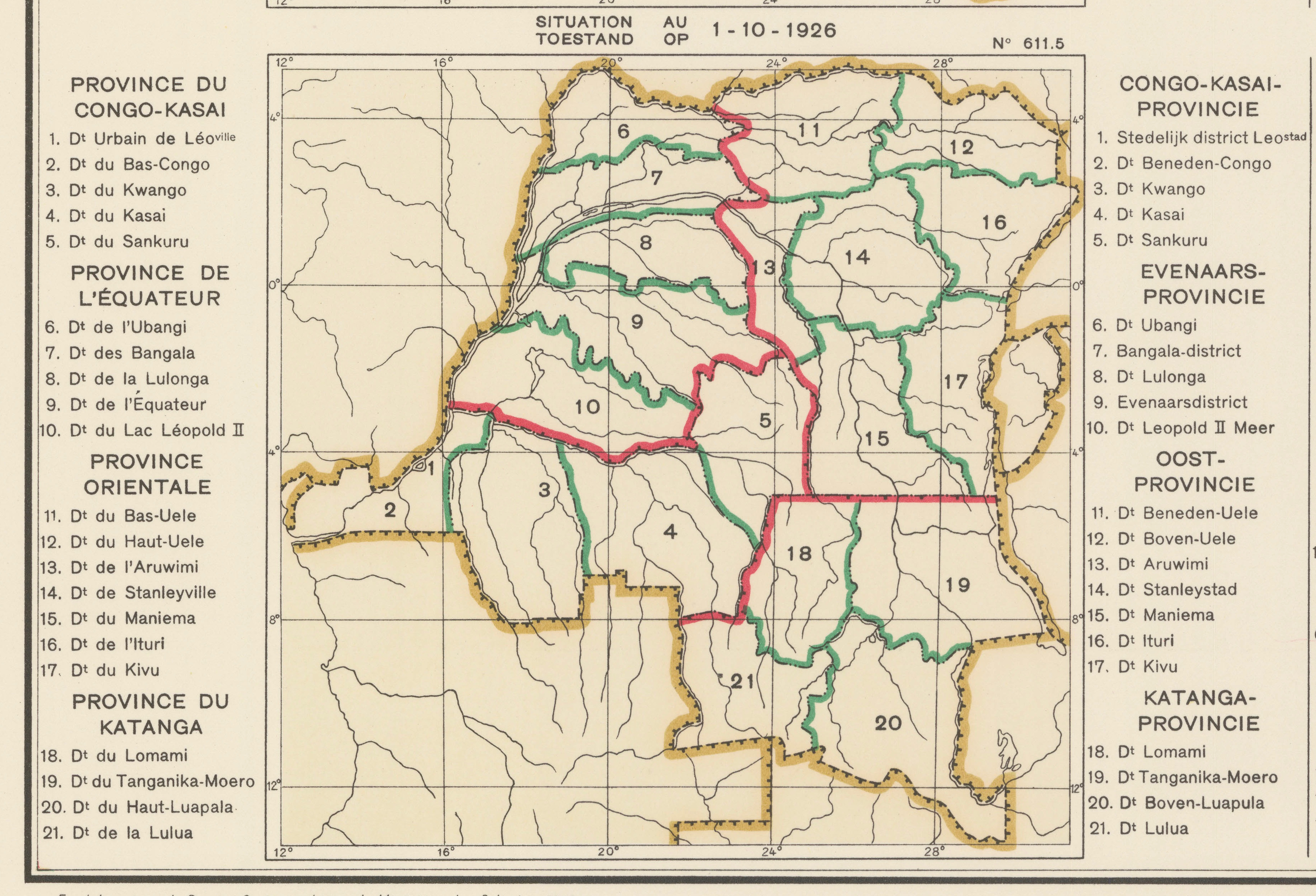
1926 provinces and districts. Ubangi above Bangala in the northwest.

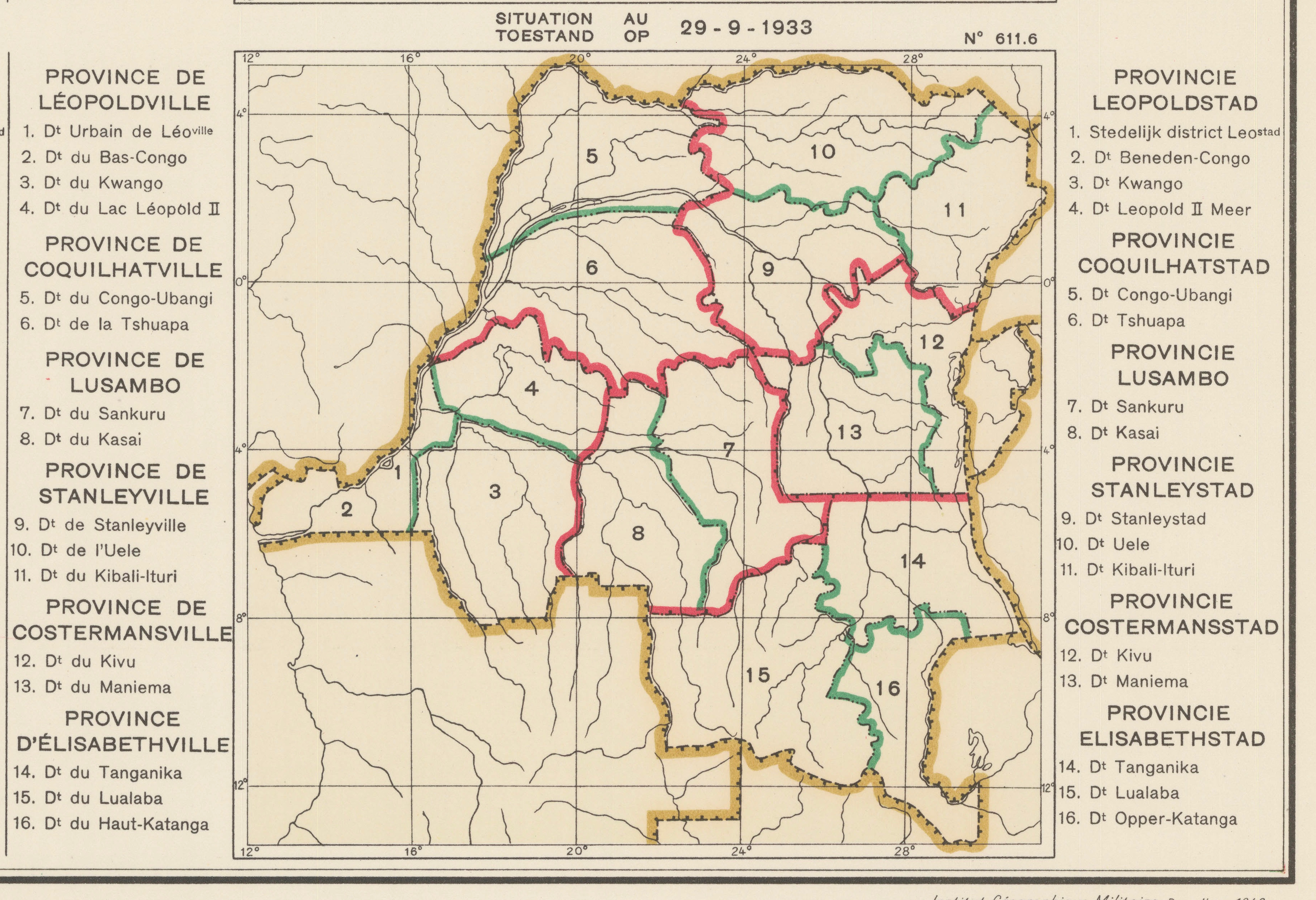
1933 provinces and districts. Congo-Ubangi in the northwest.

The current Mongala province

The current Nord-Ubangi province

== See also ==
- Districts of the Belgian Congo
- Districts of the Democratic Republic of the Congo

== Sources ==
- Atlas général du Congo / Algemene atlas van Congo (in French and Dutch), Belgium: Institut Royal Colonial Belge, 1948–1963, OCLC 681334449 / http://www.kaowarsom.be/en/online_maps
- Brass, William (8 December 2015), Demography of Tropical Africa, Princeton University Press, ISBN 978-1-4008-7714-0
- Bruneau, Jean-Claude (30 June 2009), "Les nouvelles provinces de la République Démocratique du Congo : construction territoriale et ethnicités", L'Espace Politique, 7 (2009–1), doi:10.4000/espacepolitique.1296
- "Congo (Kinshasa) Provinces", Rulers.org
- Lemarchand, René (1964), Political Awakening in the Belgian Congo, University of California Press, GGKEY:TQ2J84FWCXN
