= Équateur District =

- District
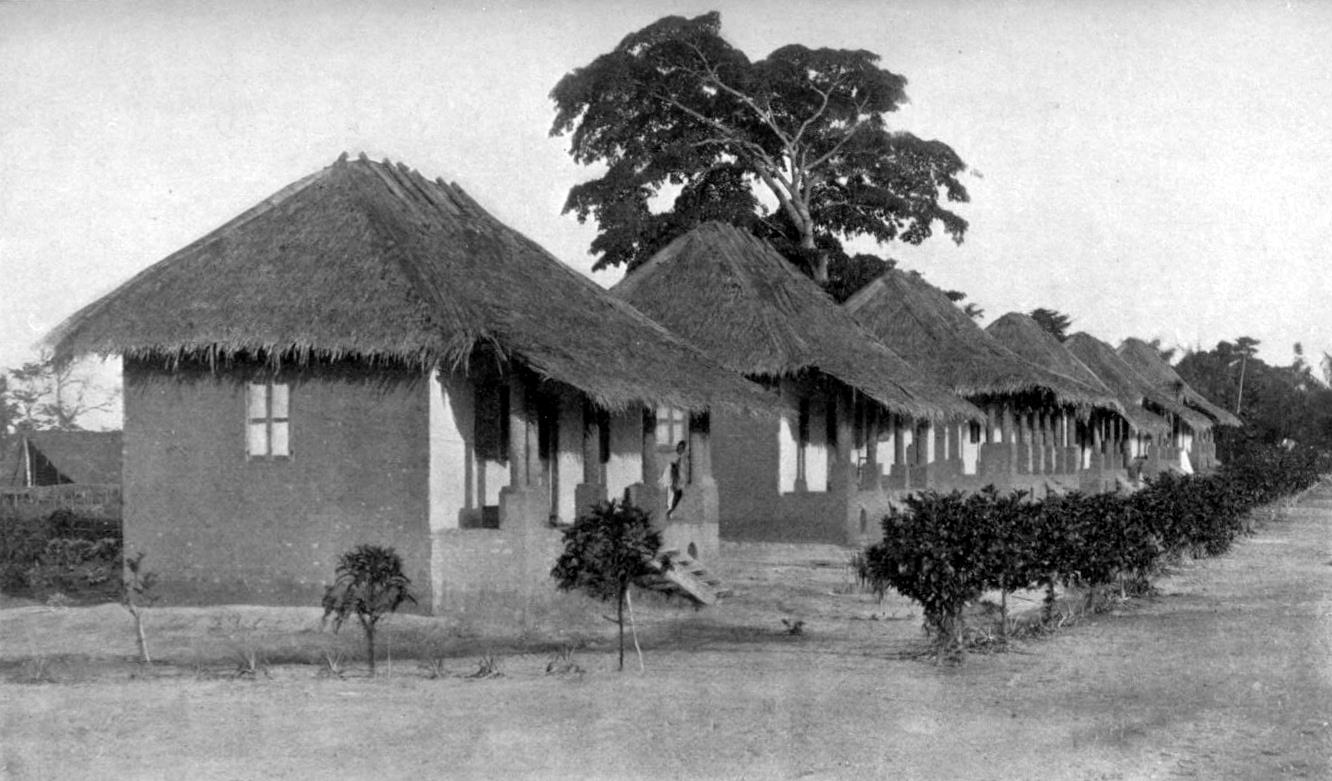
- A Street in Coquilhatville, 1896

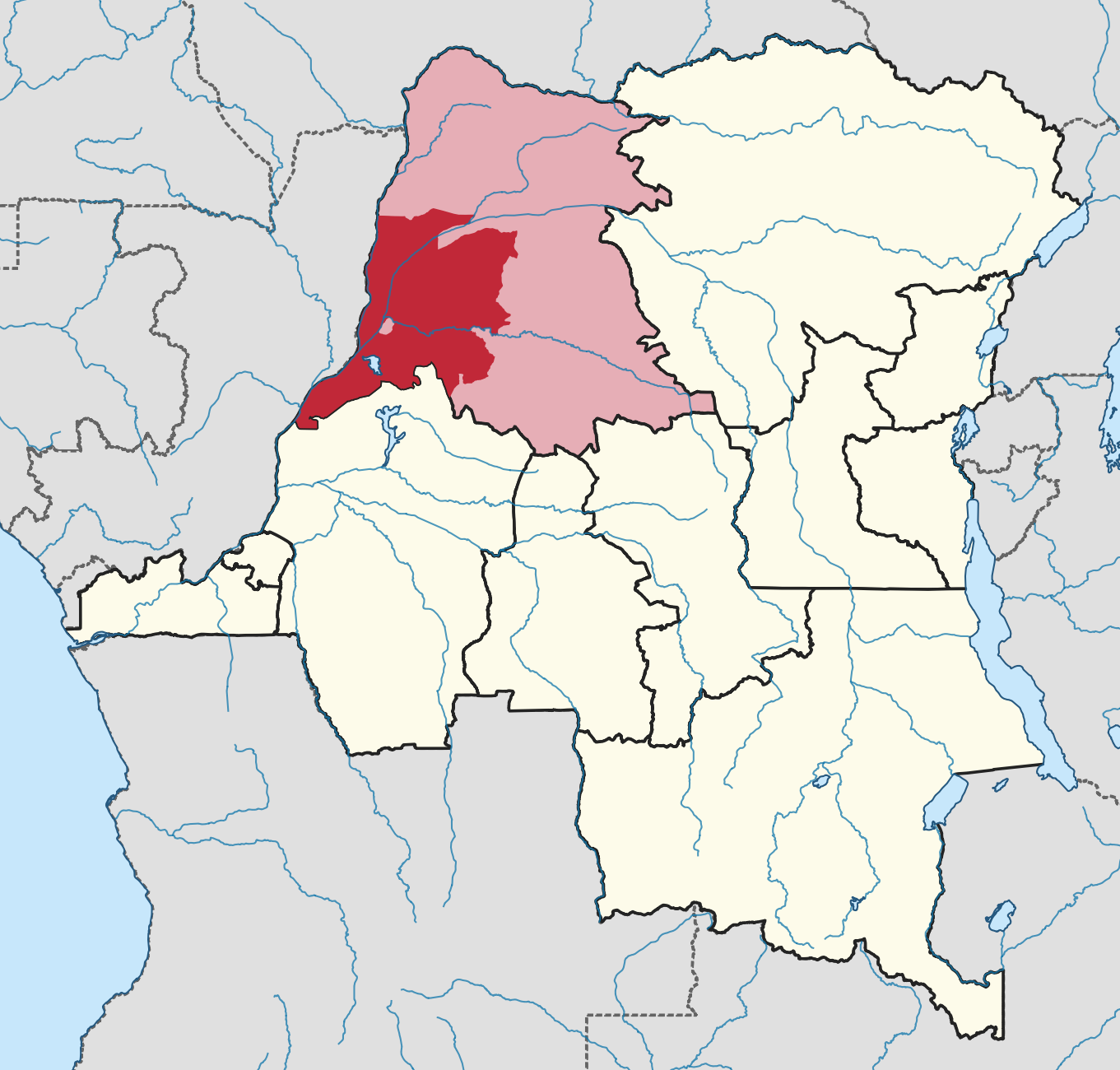
- Equateur district of Equateur province (2014)
- Coordinates: 0.066667°N 18.266667°E
- Country: Democratic Republic of the Congo
- Province: Équateur Province
- District: Équateur

Équateur District was a former district of the Congo Free State, Belgian Congo and Democratic Republic of the Congo. In 1914, it became part of former Équateur Province. The district went through various changes of extent and name over the years. The original district roughly corresponds to the current provinces of Équateur and Tshuapa.

== Congo Free State ==
Article 3 of the decree of 16 April 1887 provided for the Congo Free State to be divided into administrative districts headed by district commissioners, assisted by one or more deputies. The decree of 1 August 1888 divided the Congo Free State into eleven districts including Équateur District, with its headquarters in Coquilhatville. An 1897 map of the Congo Free State shows Équateur District extending east from the Congo River to the north of the Stanley Pool District. Most of its southern border adjoined Lac Léopold II District, with a small section in the southeast adjoining Stanley Falls District. To the east it bordered Aruwimi District and to the north it bordered Bangalas District, which stretched along the Congo.

== Belgian Congo ==
The Congo Free State was annexed by Belgium in 1908 to become the Belgian Congo. At first the structure of districts was retained. An arrêté royal of 28 March 1912 divided the Congo into 22 districts. The northern part of Équateur District was separated to form Lulonga District. An arrêté royal of 28 July 1914 grouped the districts into the provinces of Congo-Kasaï, Équateur, Orientale Province and Katanga, with the objective of improving responsiveness through decentralization. Équateur Province contained the districts of Ubangi, Bangala, Lulonga, Équateur and Lac Léopold II.

In 1933 the provinces were reorganized into six, named after their capitals, and the central government assumed more control. Équateur Province became Coquilhatville Province. The number of districts was reduced to 15, with 102 territories. Coquilhatville Province had lost Lac Léopold II to the new Léopoldville Province. It now held two districts: Lulonga had been merged with Équateur in the south to form Tshuapa District, while Ubangi and Bangala had been merged to form Congo-Ubangi District.

By 1954 Coquilhatville Province had regained its former name of Équateur Province, and the districts had again been split into Ubangi, Mongala, Tshuapa and Équateur. A 1955–1957 map shows Equateur District bordering Ubangi District to the north, Mongala District to the northeast, Tshuapa District to the east, Lac Léopold II District to the south and the French territories across the Congo River to the west. The area was 102,700 square kilometres (39,700 sq mi) out of a total of 402,100 square kilometres (155,300 sq mi) for Equateur province as a whole.

== Post-independence ==
On 14 August 1962 Équateur province was split into the provinces of Cuvette Centrale, Ubangi, and a centrally administered portion that became Moyen-Congo on 5 February 1963. Léon Engulu served as the only president (later, governor) of Cuvette-Centrale from September 1962 to 25 April 1966. On 25 April 1966 Cuvette Centrale, Moyen-Congo and Ubangi were reunited as Équateur province. The territories in the pre-2015 Équateur District were Basankusu, Bikoro, Bolomba, Bomongo, Ingende, Lukolela and Makanza.

On 11 July 2015 Équateur Province was split into the present provinces of Équateur, Tshuapa, Mongala, Nord-Ubangi and Sud-Ubangi. Équateur District was merged with the city of Mbandaka to form the new, smaller Équateur Province.

== Gallery ==
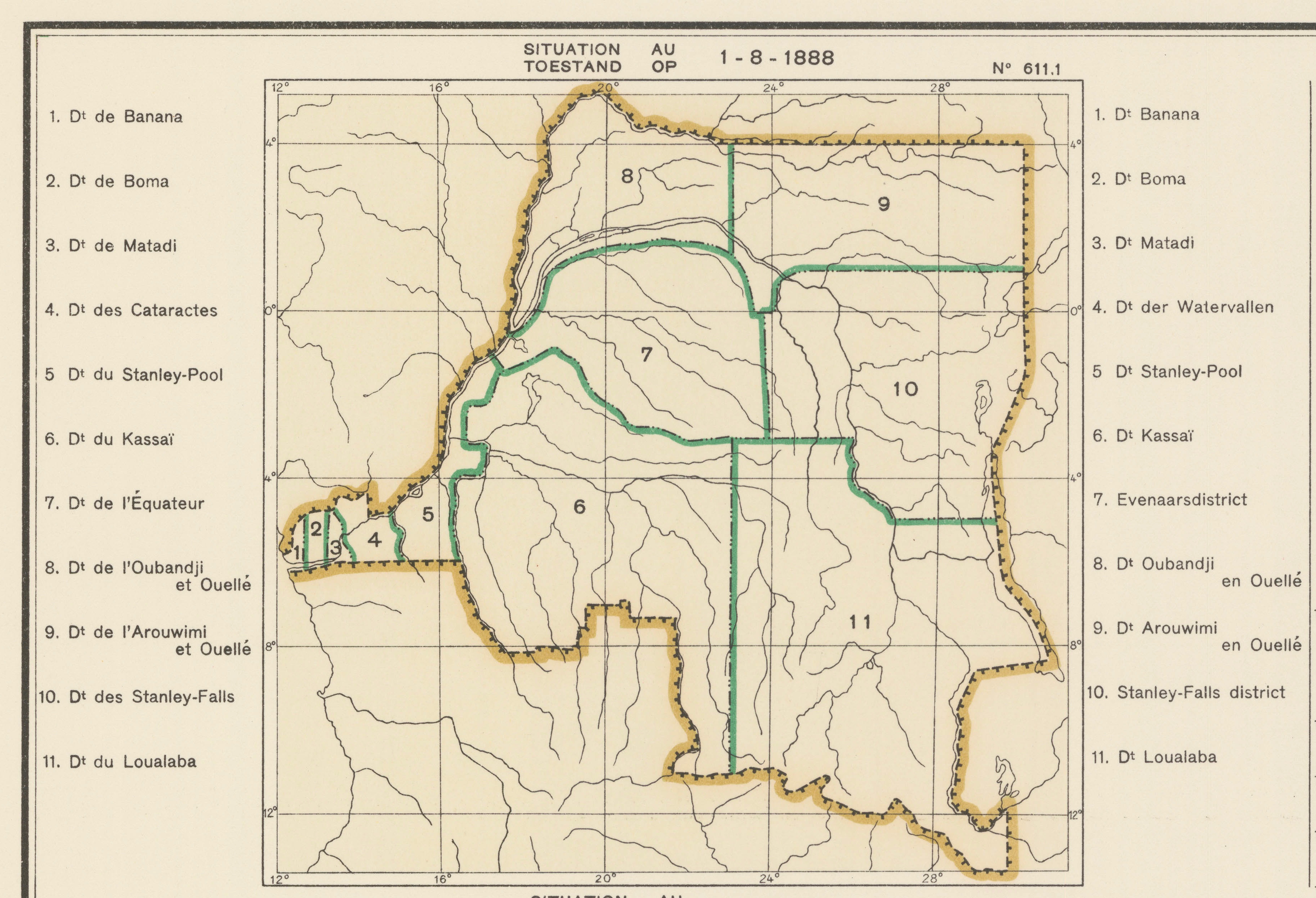
Districts of the Congo Free State in 1888

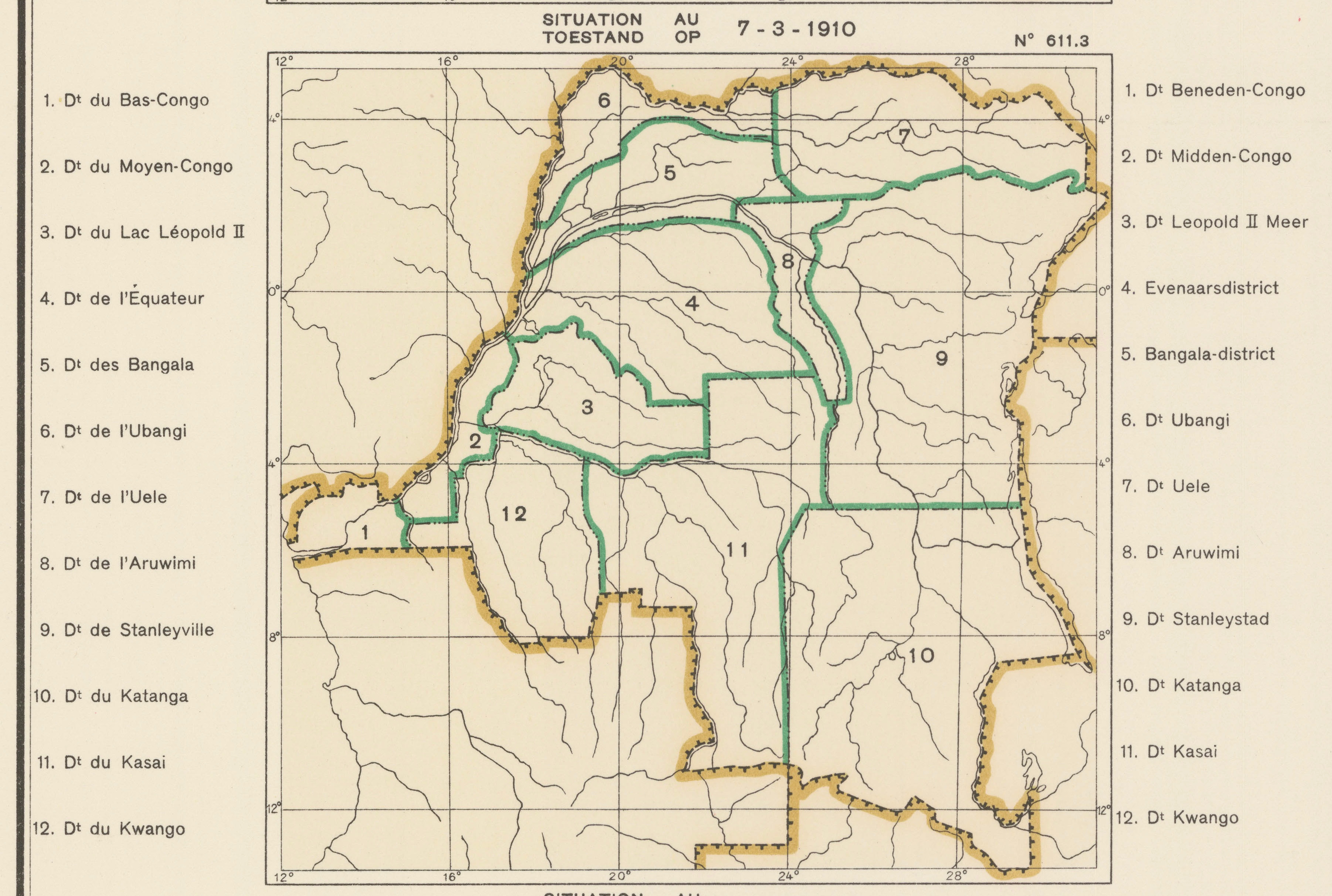
1910 districts

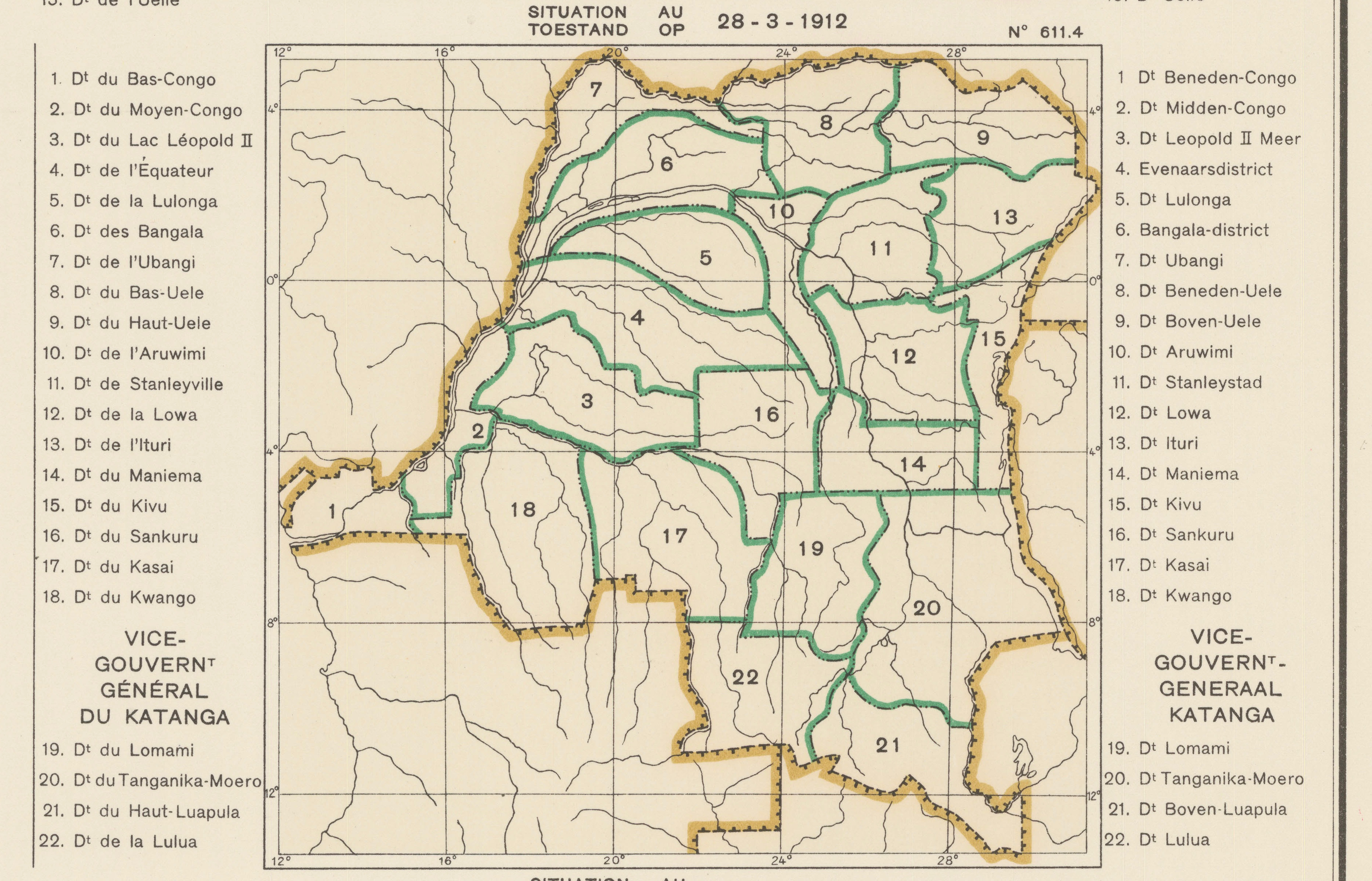
1912 districts. Équateur and Lulonga Districts separated

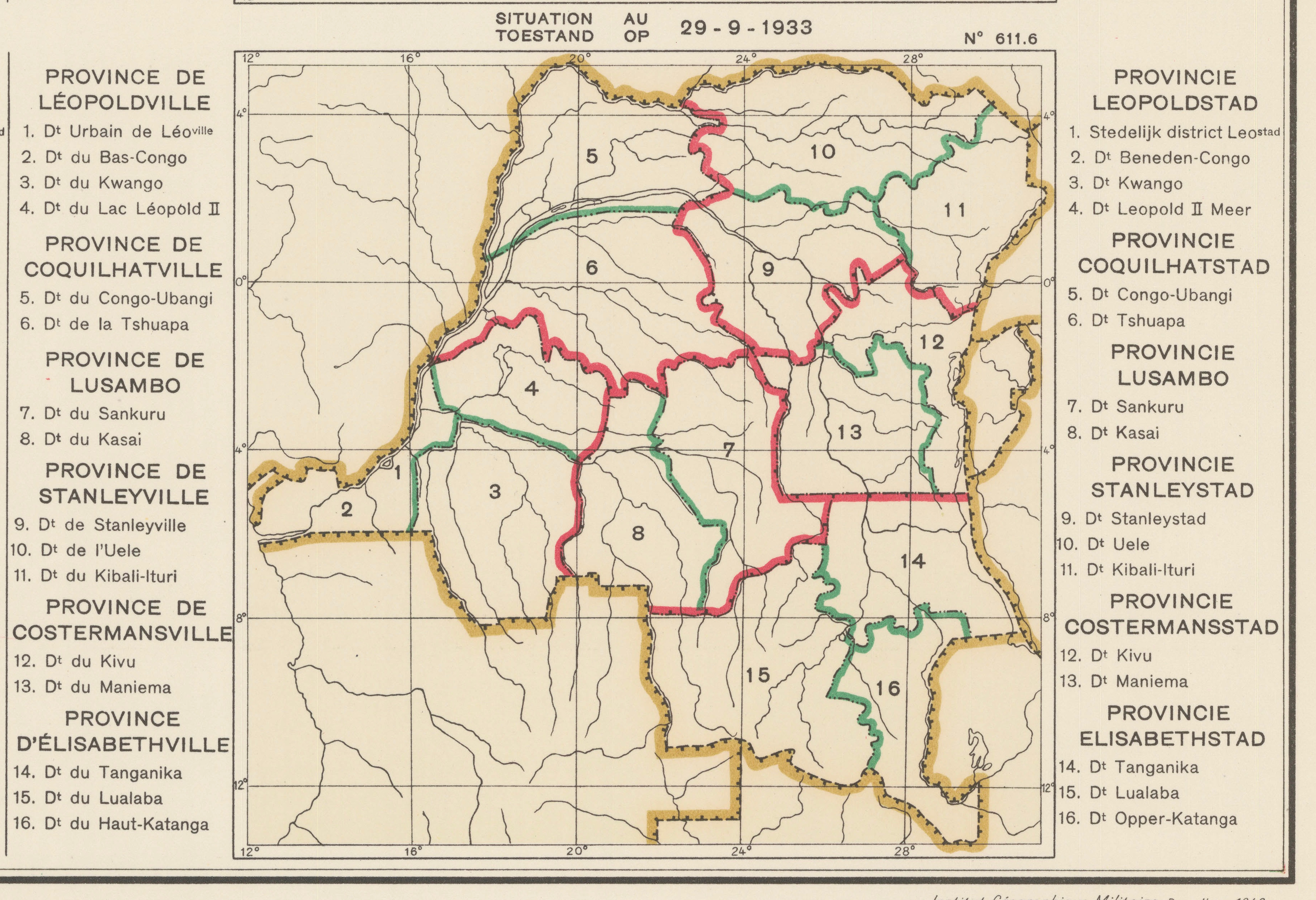
1933 districts. Équateur province recreated as Tshapa
Current province of Équateur

Current province of Tshuapa

== See also ==
- Districts of the Congo Free State
- Districts of the Belgian Congo
- Districts of the Democratic Republic of the Congo

== Sources ==
- Atlas général du Congo / Algemene atlas van Congo (in French and Dutch), Belgium: Institut Royal Colonial Belge, 1948–1963, OCLC 681334449
- Brass, William (8 December 2015), Demography of Tropical Africa, Princeton University Press, ISBN 978-1-4008-7714-0
- Blaes, X. (October 2008). "Découpage administratif de la République Démocratique du Congo" (PDF) (in French). UNOCHA and PNUD. Archived from the original (PDF) on 2010-04-01.
- Bruneau, Jean-Claude (30 June 2009), "Les nouvelles provinces de la République Démocratique du Congo : construction territoriale et ethnicités", L'Espace Politique, 7 (2009–1), doi:10.4000/espacepolitique.1296
- "Congo (Kinshasa) Provinces", Rulers.org
- Lemarchand, René (1964), Political Awakening in the Belgian Congo, University of California Press, GGKEY:TQ2J84FWCXN
- Omasombo Tshonda, Jean (2014), Bas-Uele, Musée royal de l’Afrique centrale, ISBN 978-9-4916-1586-3
- Omasombo Tshonda, Jean (2015), Mongala : Jonction des territoires et bastion d'une identité supra-ethnique (PDF), Musée royal de l’Afrique centrale, ISBN 978-9-4922-4416-1
