= Congo-Ubangi District =

- District
- Location within Democratic Republic of the Congo
- Coordinates: 3.228430°N 20.498922°E
- Country: Belgian Congo
- District: Coquilhatville
- District: Congo-Ubangi

Congo-Ubangi District (French: District du Congo-Ubangi, Dutch: District Congo-Ubangi), was a district of the Belgian Congo created in 1933 in the Coquilhatville Province. It had been dissolved by 1954.

== Location ==
The original four provinces of the Belgian Congo had considerable autonomy, but in 1933 they were reorganized into six provinces, named after their capitals, and the central government assumed more control. Équateur Province was renamed Coquilhatville Province after the capital city of Coquilhatville. A map of the 1933 administrative divisions shows Bangala District and Ubangi District had been merged to form Congo-Ubangi District, named after the Congo River, which flowed through the south of the district and the Ubangi River along its north west boundary. Congo-Ubangi District faced French territories across the Ubangi River. It adjoined Uele District to the east, Stanleyville District to the southeast, and Tshuapa District to the south.

Coquilhatville Province was renamed Équateur Province in 1947. By 1954 it had again been divided into Equateur, Tshuapa, Mongala, Ubangi. Mongala and Ubangi roughly corresponded to the former Bangala and Ubangi districts that made up Congo-Ubangi District. Today the region is divided into the Mongala, Nord-Ubangi and Sud-Ubangi provinces.

== Maps ==
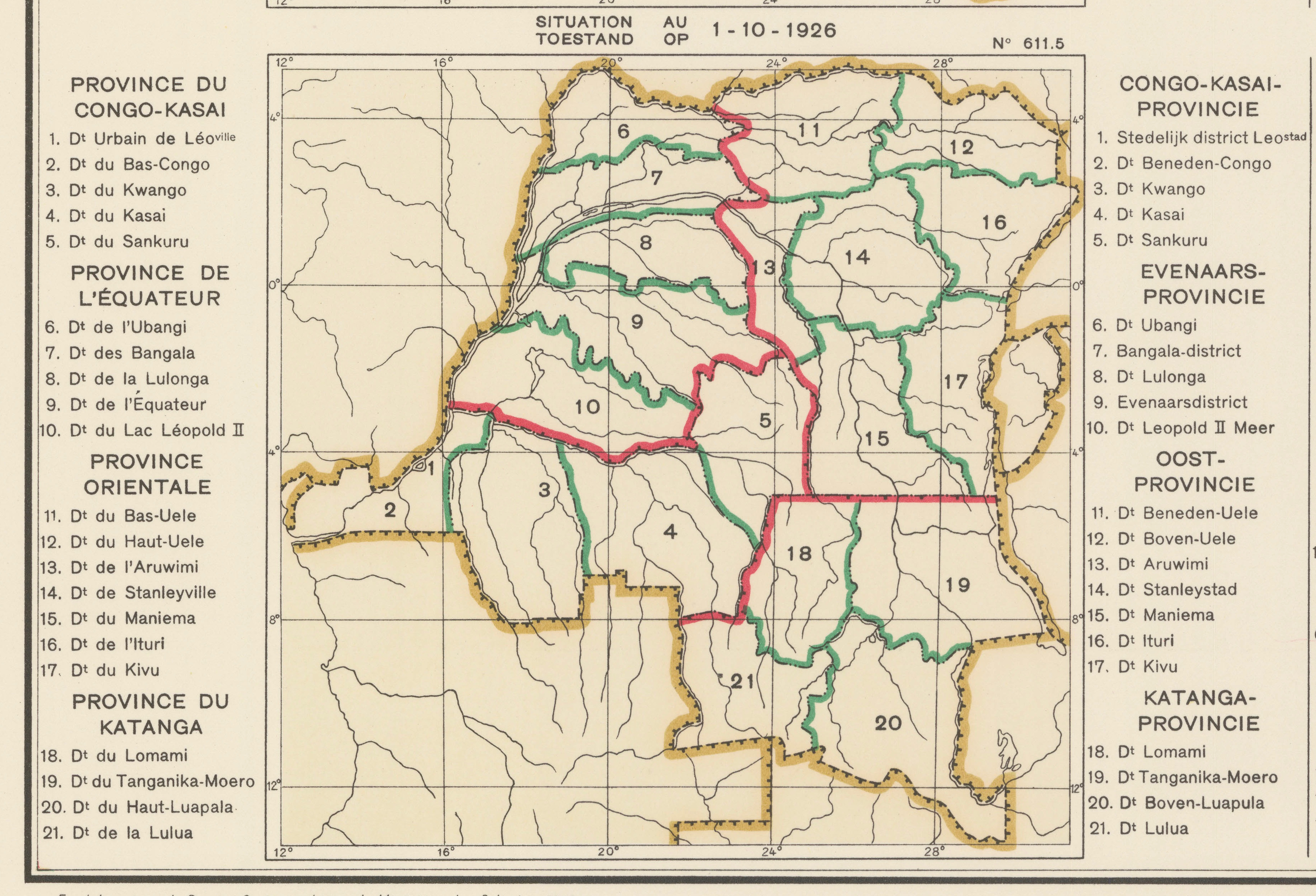
1926 provinces and districts

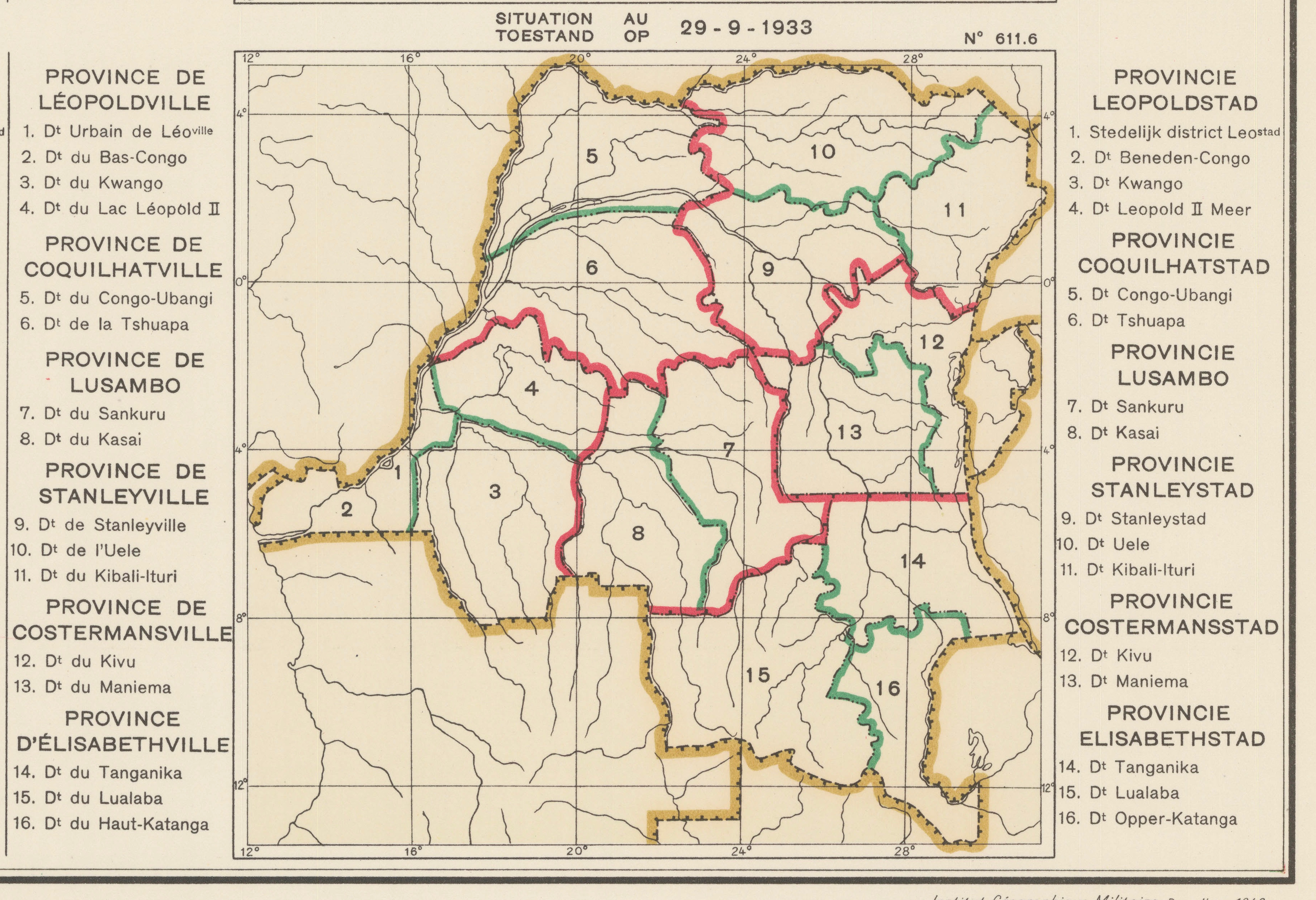
1933 provinces and districts

Mongala province

Sud-Ubangi province

Nord-Ubangi province

== See also ==
- Districts of the Belgian Congo

== Sources ==
- Atlas général du Congo / Algemene atlas van Congo (in French and Dutch), Belgium: Institut Royal Colonial Belge, 1948–1963, OCLC 681334449
- Brass, William (8 December 2015), Demography of Tropical Africa, Princeton University Press, ISBN 978-1-4008-7714-0
- Bruneau, Jean-Claude (30 June 2009), "Les nouvelles provinces de la République Démocratique du Congo : construction territoriale et ethnicités", L'Espace Politique, 7 (2009–1), doi:10.4000/espacepolitique.1296
