= Ubangi-Uélé District =

- District
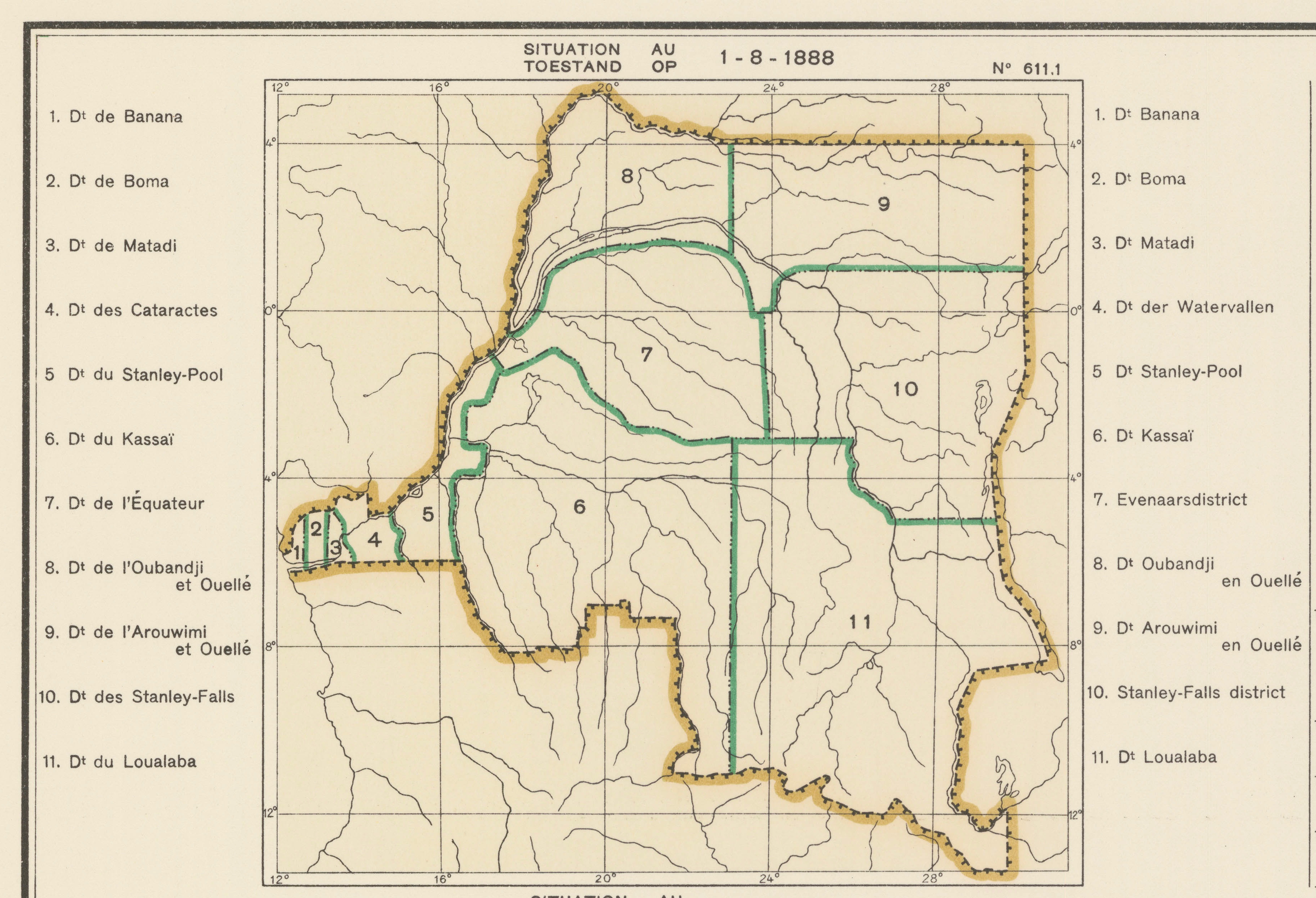
- Congo Free State in 1888. Oubandji and Ouellé District in the northwest.
- Coordinates: 3.22843°N 20.498922°E
- Country: Congo Free State
- District: Oubandji and Ouellé District

The Ubangi-Uélé District (French: District de l'Ubangi-Uélé, Dutch: District Ubangi-Uélé) was a district of the Congo Free State between 1888 and 1895. It was later split into the Ubangi District to the north and Bangala District to the south.

== Location ==
A decree of 1 August 1888 divided the Congo Free State into eleven districts, of which the first five were in the lower Congo region. Ubangi-Uélé had its capital at Nouvelle Anvers. A map of the Congo Free State in 1888 shows the Oubandji and Ouellé District covering the northwest of the colony, bordered by the Aruwimi and Ouellé District to the east and the Équateur District to the south. The Ubangi River defines the north and west boundary with the French territories. The name comes from the Ubangi River and the Uele River, which flows through the northeast of the district and feeds the Ubangi River.

Hubert Lothaire was commissioner of the district in 1890. After visiting the regions of Mongala, Lulonga and Ngiri he expanded the territory of the Bangala people, who he said originated in the Ibanza country and the whole region between the Ubangi and Congo. Lothaire was handicapped by language problems and lack of the ability to travel freely, so made various major errors, including this exaggerated view of Bangala territory.

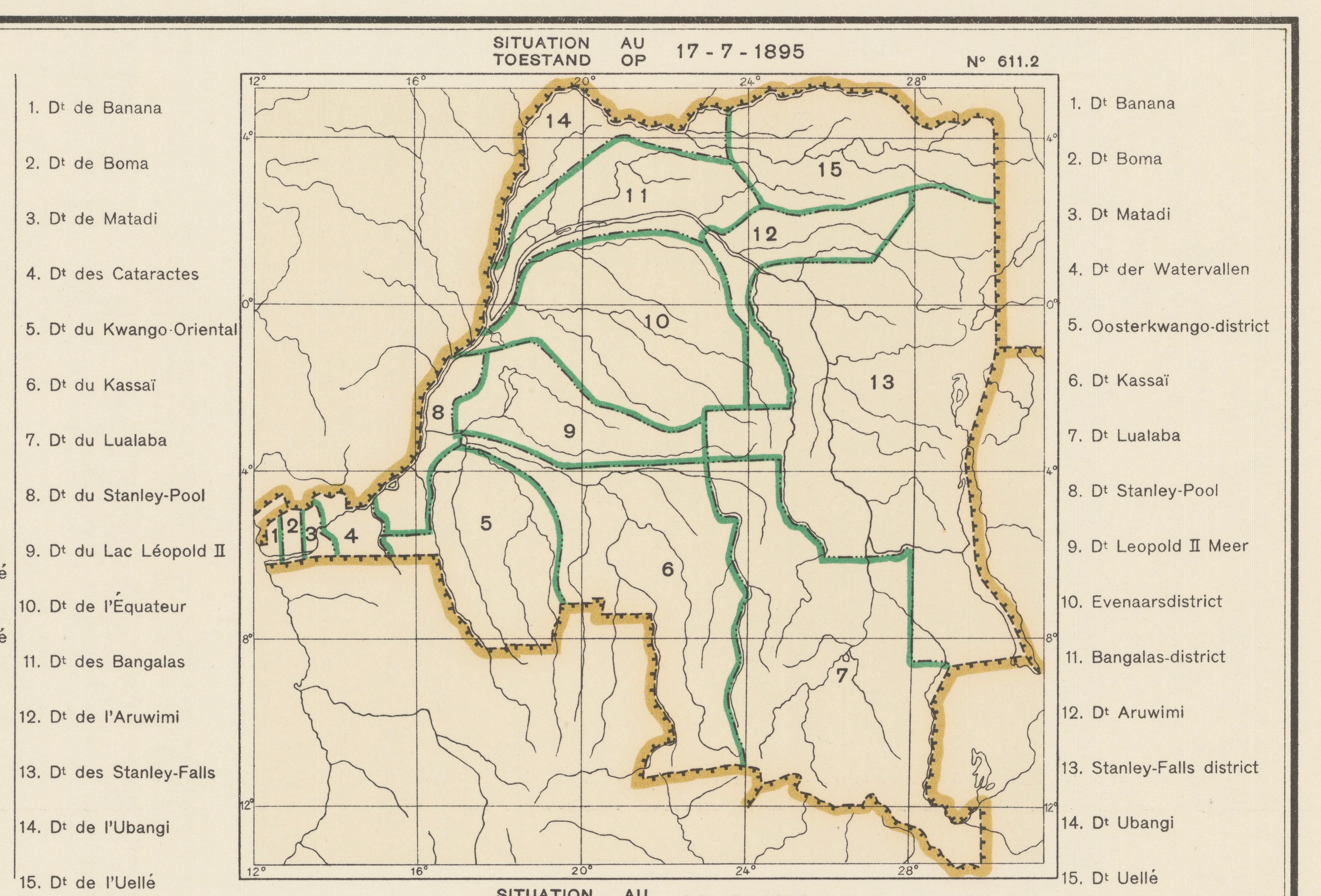
Congo Free State in 1895. Ubangi-Uélé split into Ubangi and Bangala

In 1895 the number of districts was increased to fifteen. Ubangi-Uélé was split into Ubangi and Bangala. An 1897 map shows Ubangi District in the north, along the Ubangi River, and Bangalas District in the south along the Congo River. In 1933 the Ubangi and Bangala districts were merged again into the Congo-Ubangi District.

== See also ==
- Districts of the Congo Free State

== Sources ==
- Atlas général du Congo / Algemene atlas van Congo (in French and Dutch), Belgium: Institut Royal Colonial Belge, 1948–1963, OCLC 681334449
- Omasombo Tshonda, Jean (2014), Bas-Uele, Musée royal de l’Afrique centrale, ISBN 978-9-4916-1586-3
- Omasombo Tshonda, Jean (2015), Mongala : Jonction des territoires et bastion d'une identité supra-ethnique (PDF), Musée royal de l’Afrique centrale, ISBN 978-9-4922-4416-1
- Reyserhove, Sara (2008), Reacties op en discussies over het bestaan van de Bangala groep in de jaren 1950 en 1970 (PDF) (thesis) (in Dutch), Universiteit Gent
