= Districts of the Congo Free State =

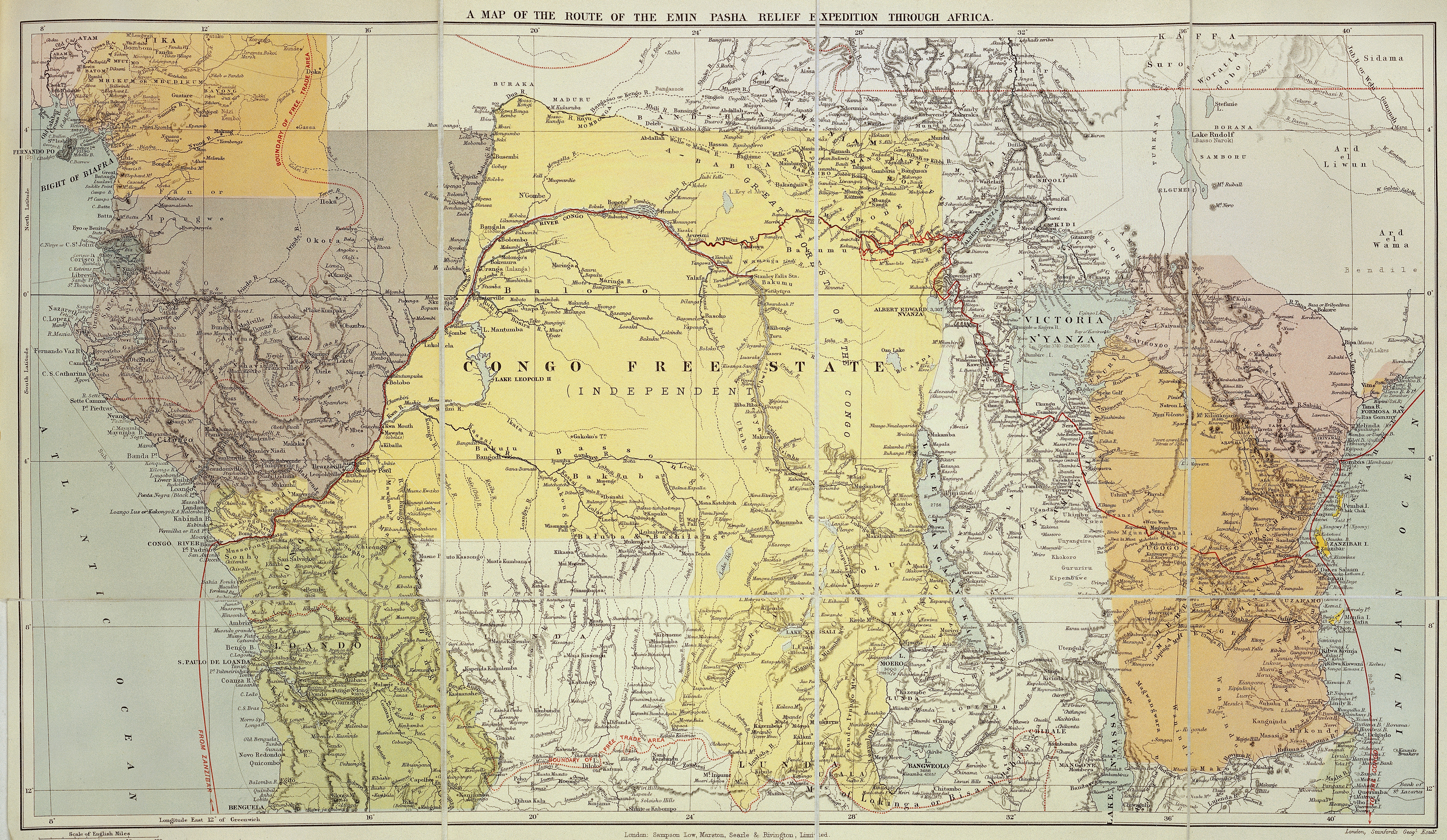
A Map of the route of the Emin Pasha Relief Expedition of 1887–1889, Published in 1890. In many areas the courses of rivers are dashed or omitted, reflecting the limited European knowledge of the region at the time.

The Districts of the Congo Free State were the primary administrative divisions of the Congo Free State from 1885 to 1908. There were various boundary changes in the period before the Congo Free State was annexed by Belgium to become the Belgian Congo.

== 1886 districts ==
A decree of 3 September 1886 by the administrator general Camille Janssen defined nine districts in the colony, each headed by a district commissioner:

- Banana
- Boma
- Matadi
- Lukungu
- Léopoldville
- Kin-Chassa (Kinshasa?)
- Bangala
- Stanley-Falls
- Lubuku-Kassaï

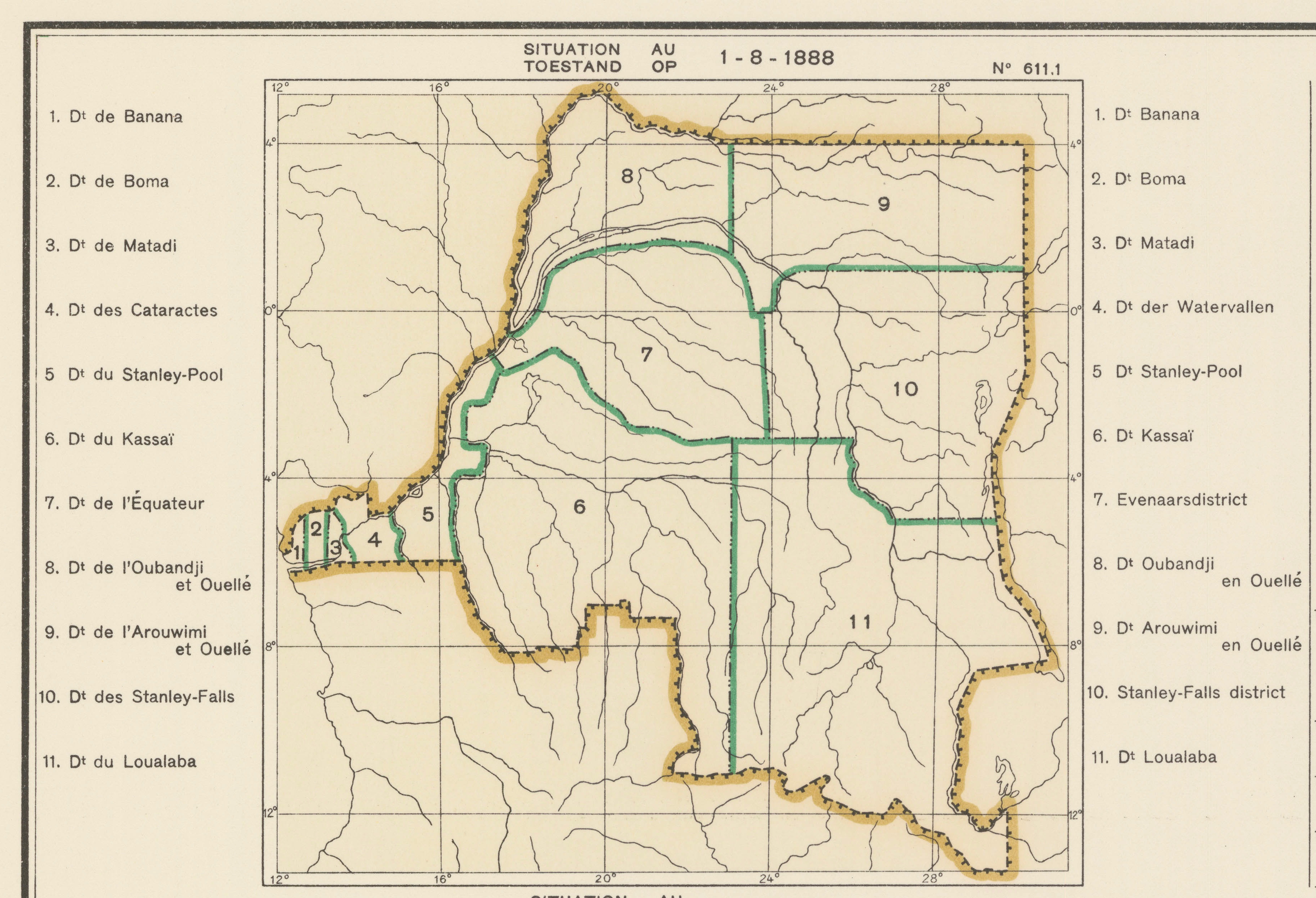
Districts of the Congo Free State in 1888

== 1888 districts ==
Article 3 of the decree of 16 April 1887 provided for the Congo Free State to be divided into administrative districts headed by district commissioners, assisted by one or more deputies. The decree of 1 August 1888 divided the Congo Free State into eleven districts, of which the first five were in the lower Congo region:

District (Capital)

- Banana (Banana)
- Boma (Boma)
- Matadi (Matadi)
- Cataractes (Lukunga)
- Stanley Pool (Léopoldville)
- Kasaï (Luluabourg)
- Équateur (Coquilhatville)
- Ubangi-Uélé (Nouvelle Anvers);
- Aruwimi-Uele (Basoko)
- Stanley Falls (Stanley Falls)
- Lualaba (Lusambo)

Lualaba District had been formed from the southern part of Stanley Falls District. A 12th district was created, Kwango Central, on 10 June 1890. By 1890 there was a governor general resident in Boma and commissioners in these 12 districts.

== 1895 districts ==
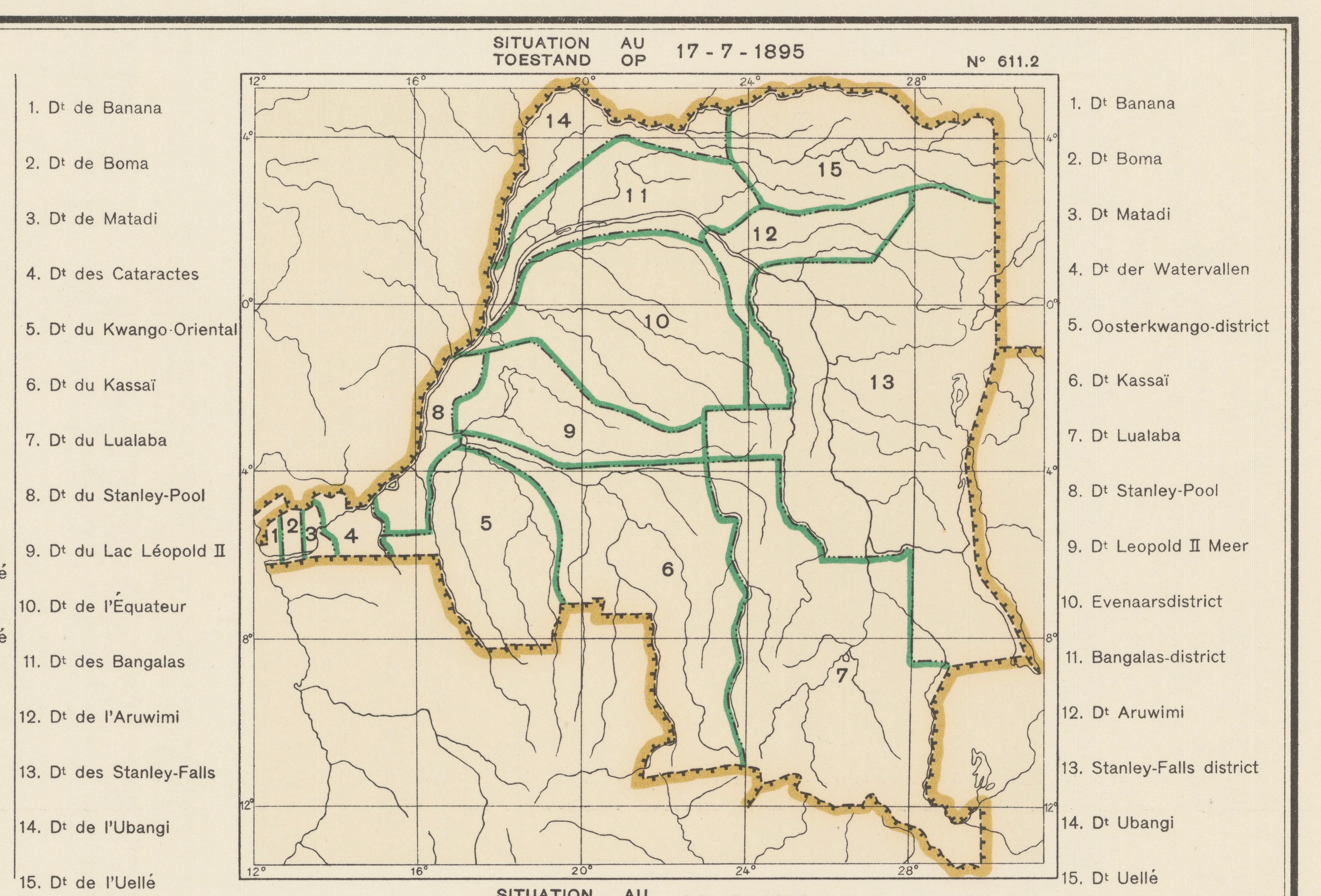
Districts of the Congo Free State in 1895

In 1895 the number of the districts was increased to fifteen. Aruwimi-Uele was split into two districts: Uele (Niangara) and Aruwimi (Basoko). Uele was threatened by the Arabs, and was placed under special administration. The districts were:

- Banana
- Boma
- Matadi
- Cataractes
- Stanley Pool
- Kwango
- Kasai
- Lac Léopold II
- Équateur
- Bangala
- Ubangui
- Uele
- Aruwimi
- Stanley Falls
- Lualaba

An 1897 map of the Congo Free State showed it divided into the districts of Banana, Boma, Matadi and Cataractes along the lower Congo River, then the district of Stanley Pool along the east bank of the river to the north. The district of Kwango Orientale was to the southeast of Stanley Pool District, south of a narrow extension along the Kasai River of the Lualaba Kassai District, which covered the Kasai and Sankuru river basins. The Lac Léopold II District was north of the Kasai River and south of Équateur District to the east of the Congo River. North of Équateur the Bangalas District stretched along the northwestern section of the Congo River, and the Ubangi District defined the northeastern border of the colony with the French colonies, which lay across the Ubangi River.

Further east the Uellé District covered the basin of the Uele River, the main tributary of the Ubangi, and extended along the north of the colony to the Lado Enclave on the Nile, leased from Britain. The Aruwimi District lay to the south of Uellé District along the Aruwimi River, formed where the Ituri River flowing west from the Lake Albert region meets the Nepoko River. The Aruwimi District had a long extension to the south of the Congo River along the west bank of the Lomami River. The remainder of the colony was covered by the huge Stanley Falls District, stretching south along the Congo into Katanga, bordered by the British and German possessions to the east of Lake Tanganyika and Lake Albert.

The 1897 map does not show the Lualaba District formed from the southern part of Stanley Falls District. It shows the Lualaba Kassai District well to the west of the Lualaba River.

== Later changes ==
On 15 July 1898 the Stanley Falls District officially became the Orientale Province, with Stanleyville as its headquarters. A 1907 report listed 14 districts, with Lualaba and Kasai combined in one district as in the 1897 map. The Free State was annexed by Belgium in 1908 as the Belgian Congo. At the time of annexation there were 15 districts in the Congo Free State:

== See also ==
- Districts of the Belgian Congo
- Districts of the Democratic Republic of the Congo

== Sources ==
- Atlas général du Congo / Algemene atlas van Congo (in French and Dutch), Belgium: Institut Royal Colonial Belge, 1948–1963, OCLC 681334449
- Auzias, Dominique; Labourdette, Jean-Paul (2006). Congo: république démocratique. Petit Futé. ISBN 2-7469-1412-3.
- Etat Indépendant du Congo (1886), Bulletin Officiel (PDF)
- Lemarchand, René (1964), Political Awakening in the Belgian Congo, University of California Press, GGKEY:TQ2J84FWCXN
- Omasombo Tshonda, Jean (2014), Bas-Uele, Musée royal de l’Afrique centrale, ISBN 978-9-4916-1586-3
- Omasombo Tshonda, Jean (2015), Mongala : Jonction des territoires et bastion d'une identité supra-ethnique (PDF), Musée royal de l’Afrique centrale, ISBN 978-9-4922-4416-1
- D'Hanis (1890), "État Indépendant du Congo le District d'Upoto et la Fondation du Camp de l'Aruwimi", Bulletin / Société belge de géographie (in French), Bruxelles: Société royale belge de géographie
- "Territoire et population" (PDF), La Vérite Sur le Congo (in French), 4 (7), Brussels: Fédération Pour La Défense Des Intérêts Belges À L’étranger, 15 July 1907
