= Équateur (former province) =

Democratic Republic of the Congo province (1966–2015)

Équateur Province Province de l'Équateur
- Former province of the Democratic Republic of the Congo
- 1919–2015
- Équateur from 1933
- Capital: Mbandaka
- Demonym: Equatorian
- Area
  - 2010 est.: 403,292 km^{2} (155,712 sq mi)
- Population
  - 2010 est.: 7,501,902
- Historical era: Contemporary
  - Established: 1919
  - Disestablished: 2015

Équateur (French for 'Equator') was a province in the northwest of Belgian Congo and the independent Republic of the Congo, now known as Democratic Republic of the Congo. It had its origins in the Équateur District of the Congo Free State, the private property of King Leopold II of Belgium. It was upgraded to provincial status in 1917. Between 1933 and 1947 it was named Coquilhatville. In 1962 it was divided into three smaller provinces, but they were recombined in 1966. Équateur was one of the eleven provinces of the Democratic Republic of the Congo until 2015, when it was split into the new, smaller Équateur province, as well as the Tshuapa, Mongala, Nord-Ubangi and Sud-Ubangi provinces.

Located in the north of the country, the province bordered the Republic of the Congo to the west, the Central African Republic to the north, to the east the Orientale province, and to the south the Kasai-Oriental, Kasai-Occidental, and Bandundu provinces. The word "Équateur" is French for the Equator, which lies less than 4 kilometres (2.5 mi) south of the provincial capital of Mbandaka, a city on the Congo River.

== History ==
The District of Équateur was created by decree of Leopold II on 1 August 1888, which defined the limits of the Congo Free State and the eleven districts, including Équateur. The first district commissioners were named on 27 October 1888. At first there was no commissioner for Equateur, but on 25 June 1889 the governor general placed Van Kerchhoven, successor to Camille Coquilhat, in command of the District of Ubangi and Uele based at Nouvelle-Anvers (formerly Bangala Station). The first true head of Équateur was Charles-François-Alexandre Lemaire (1863-1925), appointed in December 1890. He moved the district capital to the newly named Coquilhatville.

In 1908 the state of Belgium annexed the Congo Free State as the Belgian Congo. In 1917 Équateur District became Équateur Province under Georges Moulaert (1875-1958), who became deputy governor general of the province on 20 August 1917. In 1933 the province was renamed Coquihatville Province, under a provincial commissioner. The first commissioner was J. Jorrissen. On 27 May 1947 the province regained the name of Équateur/Evenaar. It became an autonomous province of the Congo republic on 30 June 1960. On 14 August 1962 Équateur was split into the provinces of Cuvette Centrale, Ubangi, and a centrally administered portion that became Moyen-Congo on 5 February 1963.

On 25 April 1966 Cuvette Centrale, Moyen-Congo and Ubangi were reunited as Équateur province. In 2015 when it was again split under the terms of the 2006 Constitution, it formed five new provinces:

Nord-Ubangi, consisting of 56.644 km^{2} (21.870 sq mi), with its capital at the city of Gbadolite
Mongala, consisting of 58.141 km^{2} (22.448 sq mi), with its capital at the city of Lisala
Sud-Ubangi, consisting of 51.648 km^{2} (19.941 sq mi), with its capital at the city of Gemena
Équateur, consisting of 103.902 km^{2} (40.117 sq mi), with its capital at the city of Mbandaka
Tshuapa, consisting of 132.957 km^{2} (51.335 sq mi), with its capital at the city of Boende

== Divisions ==
Under the Democratic Republic of the Congo, the province was divided into the cities of Mbandaka, Gbadolite and Zongo and the districts of Équateur, Nord-Ubangi, Sud-Ubangi, Mongala and Tshuapa.

Name	District	Territory	Pop. 2010	Coordinates
Basankusu	Équateur District	Basankusu Territory	27,492	1°14′N 19°48′E
Befale	Tshuapa District	Befale Territory	3,723	0°28′N 20°58′E
Bikoro	Équateur District	Bikoro Territory	7,128	0°45′S 18°07′E
Binga	Mongala District	Binga Territory	64,639	2°24′N 20°25′E
Boende	Tshuapa District	Boende Territory	33,765	0°13′S 20°52′E
Bokungu	Tshuapa District	Bokungu Territory	7,829	0°41′S 22°19′E
Bolomba	Équateur District	Bolomba Territory	4,252	0°29′N 19°12′E
Bomongo	Équateur District	Bomongo Territory	4,784	1°22′N 18°21′E
Bongandanga	Mongala District	Bongandanga Territory	3,648	1°31′N 21°03′E
Bosobolo	Nord-Ubangi District	Bosobolo Territory	12,932	4°11′N 19°53′E
Budjala	Sud-Ubangi District	Budjala Territory	21,259	2°39′N 19°42′E
Bumba	Mongala District	Bumba Territory	103,328	2°11′N 22°28′E
Businga	Nord-Ubangi District	Businga Territory	32,590	3°20′N 20°52′E
Gbadolite	(city)	(city)	48,083	4°17′N 21°01′E
Gemena	Sud-Ubangi District	Gemena Territory	132,971	3°16′N 19°46′E
Ikela	Tshuapa District	Ikela Territory	15,214	1°11′S 23°16′E
Ingende	Équateur District	Ingende Territory	3,951	0°15′S 18°57′E
Kungu	Sud-Ubangi District	Kungu Territory	7,738	2°47′N 19°12′E
Libenge	Sud-Ubangi District	Libenge Territory	23,962	3°40′N 18°37′E
Lisala	Mongala District	Lisala Territory	79,235	2°08′N 21°31′E
Lukolela	Équateur District	Lukolela Territory	15,230	1°03′S 17°12′E
Mbandaka	(city)	(city)	324,236	0°02′N 18°16′E
Mobayi-Mbongo	Nord-Ubangi District	Mobayi-Mbongo Territory	5,413	4°18′N 21°11′E
Monkoto	Tshuapa District	Monkoto Territory	8,640	1°38′S 20°39′E
Yakoma	Nord-Ubangi District	Yakoma Territory	11,720	4°06′N 22°26′E
Zongo	(city)	(city)	32,516	4°21′N 18°36′E

== Education ==
- University of Mbandaka

== See also ==
- List of governors of Équateur (former province)

== Sources ==
- Lufungula, Lewono (1986), "Les gouverneurs de l'Équateur, 1885 - 1960", Annales Aequatoria, 7, Honoré Vinck: 149–166, JSTOR 25836402

== Bibliography ==
- Konda ku Mbuta, A. et al. (2012); Plantes medicinales de traditions - Province de l'Equateur, R.D. Congo; I.R.S.S. Kinshasa; ISBN 978-0-9554208-5-6; 419 pp.
