= Ubangi Province =

Ubangi Province (1962−1966) was a former province in the north of Zaire, formed from a division of the first Équateur Province.

It was then reincorporated into Équateur Province in 1966. After the 2015 reorganisation of its provinces, what used to Ubangi province, now lies within Nord-Ubangi and Sud-Ubangi provinces of the Democratic Republic of the Congo.

== See also ==
- Équateur Province topics
