= Tshuapa =

Province of the Democratic Republic of the Congo

Tshuapa Province de la Tshuapa (French)
- Province
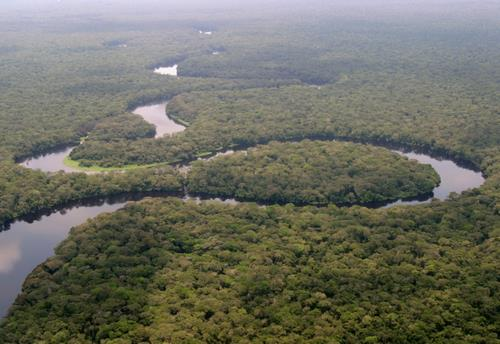
- Salonga National Park

- Seal

- Coordinates: 00°44′S 19°12′E
- Country: DR Congo
- Established: 2015
- Named for: Tshuapa River
- Capital: Boende

Government
  - Governor: Armand Yambe

Area
  - Total: 132,940 km^{2} (51,330 sq mi)

Population (2020 est.)
  - Total: 1,944,500
  - Density: 14.627/km^{2} (37.883/sq mi)

Ethnic groups
  - Native: Anamongo • Batwa • Ngombe • Bambole • Bayela • Balalia • Bangandu
- Time zone: UTC+1 (WAT)
- License Plate Code: (Democratic Republic of the Congo) CGO / 26
- Official language: French
- National language: Lingala
- Website: https://www.facebook.com/profile.php?id=100064006181735

Tshuapa is one of the 21 provinces of the Democratic Republic of the Congo created in the 2015 repartitioning. Tshuapa, Équateur, Mongala, Nord-Ubangi, and Sud-Ubangi provinces are the result of the dismemberment of the former Équateur province. Tshuapa was formed from the Tshuapa District whose town of Boende was elevated to capital city of the new province.

== Administration ==
Tshuapa is divided in to six territories and one independently administered city.

Administrative division	Type	Map
Boende	City	Boende
Befale	Territory	Befale
Boende	Territory	Boende
Bokungu	Territory	Bokungu
Djolu	Territory	Djolu
Ikela	Territory	Ikela
Monkoto	Territory	Monkoto

== Geography ==
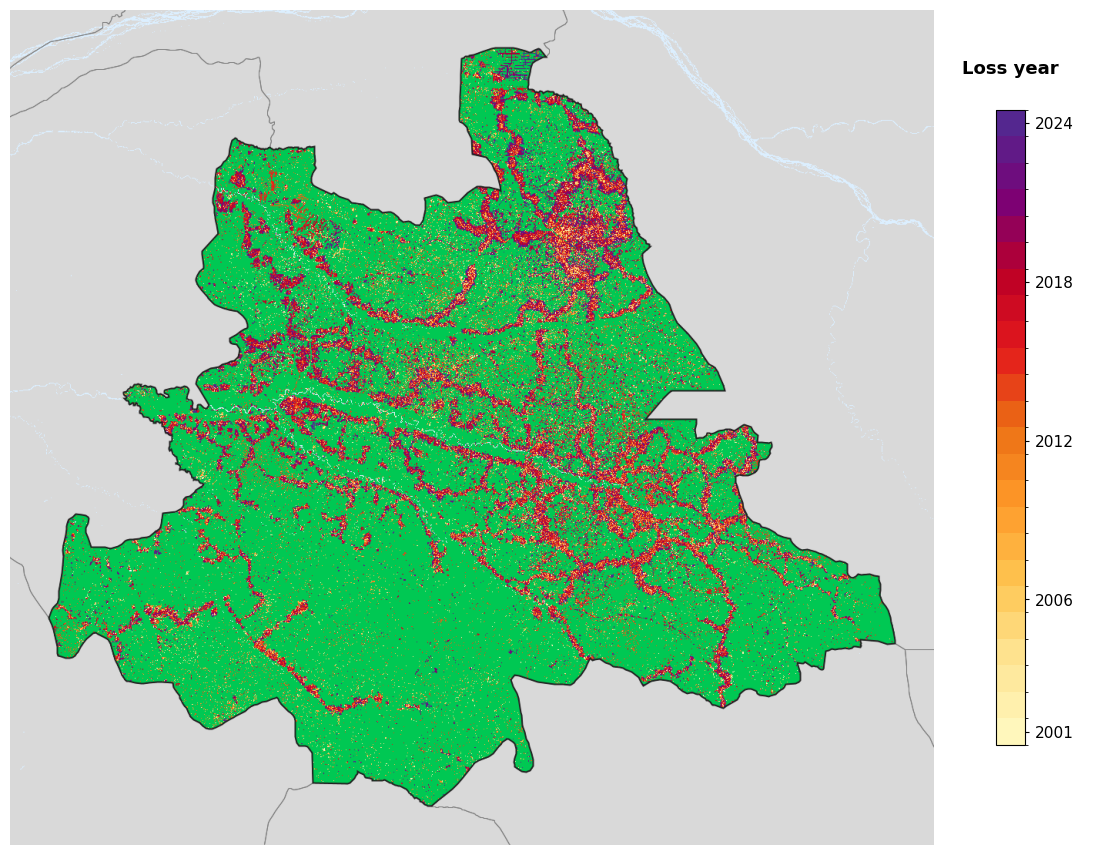
Tree-cover loss year in Tshuapa, 2001-2024, from the Global Forest Change dataset.

The province is named for the Tshuapa River. It is located in the northwestern Democratic Republic of the Congo, and borders on the provinces of Équateur to the west, Mongala to the north, Tshopo to the east, and Sankuru, Kasaï, and Mai-Ndombe to the south. Most of Tshuapa has a tropical rainforest climate by the Köppen-Geiger climate classification, with smaller parts having a tropical monsoon climate.

== History ==
- Tshuapa was previously administered as a district as part of Équateur province.
- On 1924.02.11, the Catholic mission established the Apostolic Prefecture of Tsuapa here, on territory split off from the then Apostolic Vicariate of Nouvelle-Anvers. Later, it was renamed on

1926.01.28 as Apostolic Prefecture of Coquilhatville / de Coquilhatville (Latin). Having gained territory from the same Apostolic Vicariate of Nouvelle-Anvers); it became the Roman Catholic Archdiocese of Mbandaka-Bikoro.

== Notable residents ==
- Guy Loando Mboyo
- Ambroise Boimbo
- Justin Marie Bomboko

== See also ==
- Tsuapa Red Colobus (Primate Species)
