= Mongala =

Province of the Democratic Republic of the Congo

Mongala Province de la Mongala (French)
- Province
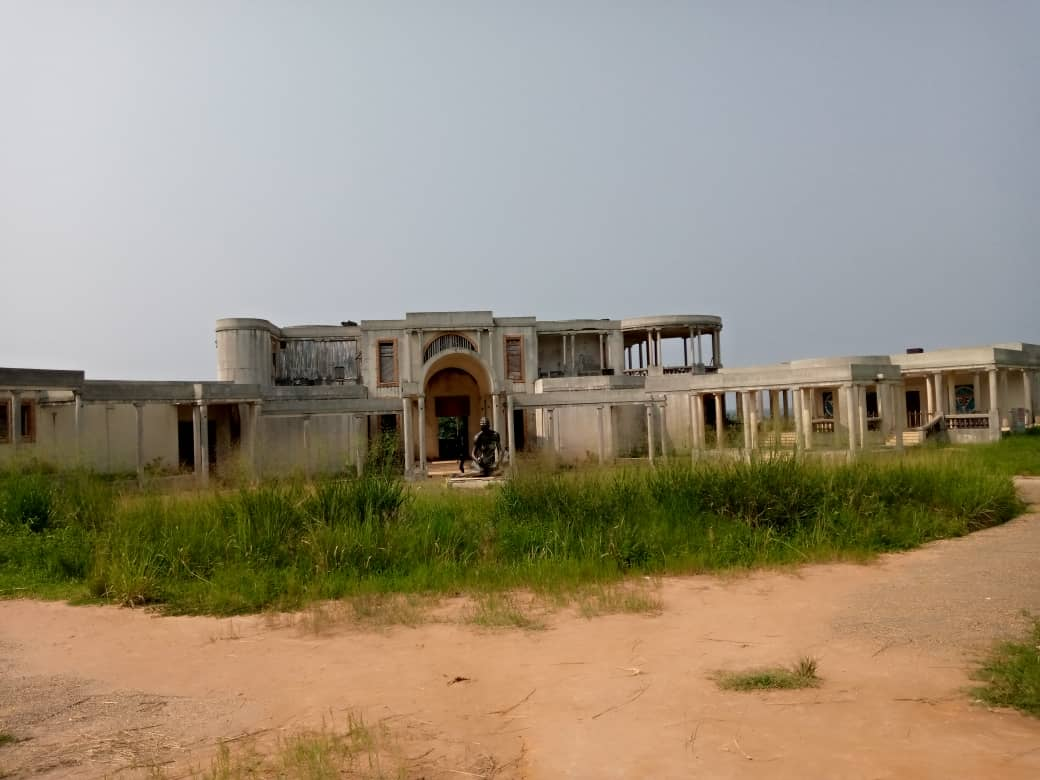
- Ruins of the residence of former president Mobutu Sese Seko at Lisala.

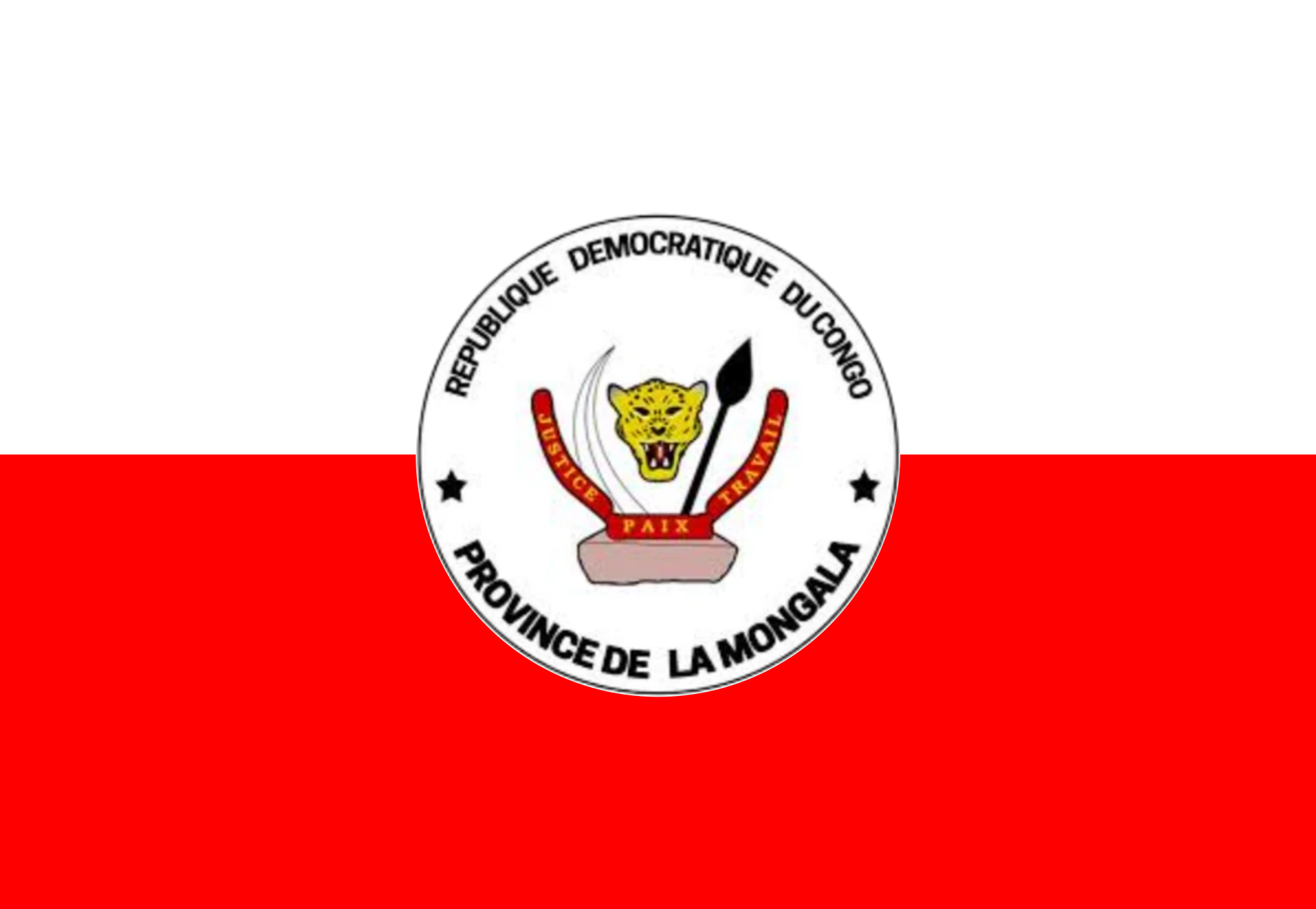
- Flag Seal

- Coordinates: 02°09′N 21°31′E
- Country: DR Congo
- Established: 2015
- Named for: Mongala River
- Capital: Lisala

Government
  - Governor: Jean-Collins Makaka

Area
  - Total: 58,141 km^{2} (22,448 sq mi)

Population (2020 est.)
  - Total: 2,114,100
  - Density: 36.362/km^{2} (94.176/sq mi)

Ethnic groups
  - Native: Anamongo • Ngombe • Babudza • Bapoto • Babango • Pagibete
- Time zone: UTC+1 (West Africa Time)
- License Plate Code: (Democratic Republic of the Congo) CGO / 18
- Official language: French
- National language: Lingala
- Website: https://www.provincemongala.com/index.html

Mongala is one of the 21 provinces of the Democratic Republic of the Congo created in the 2015 repartitioning. Mongala, Équateur, Nord-Ubangi, Sud-Ubangi, and Tshuapa provinces are the result of the dismemberment of the former Équateur province. Mongala was formed from the Mongala District whose town of Lisala was elevated to capital city of the new province.

== Administration ==
The province is divided in to three territories and one independently administered city.

Administrative division	Type	Map
Lisala	City	Lisala
Bongandanga	Territory	Bongandanga
Bumba	Territory	Bumba
Lisala	Territory	Lisala

== Geography ==
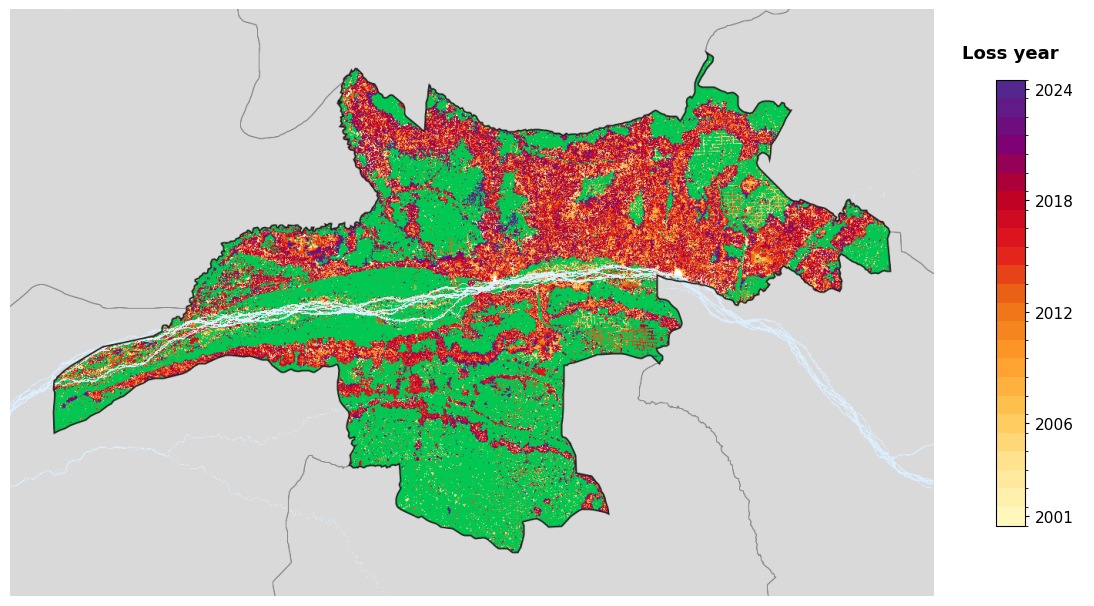
Tree-cover loss year in Mongala, 2001-2024, from the Global Forest Change dataset.

Mongala is located in the northwestern Democratic Republic of the Congo, and borders the provinces of Équateur to the southwest, Tshuapa to the south, Tshopo to the southeast, Bas-Uele to the east, Nord-Ubangi to the north, Sud-Ubangi to the northwest. Most of the province has a tropical monsoon climate by the Köppen-Geiger climate classification, except for parts of the south, which have a tropical rainforest climate.

== History ==
From 1963–1966, Mongala Province was known as Moyen-Congo. However, under Mobutu, the province was reintegrated into the former Équateur province where it was administered as Mongala District, until 2015. Presidents (later governors) of the Moyen-Congo province were:

- 6 April 1963 – June 1964 Laurent Eketebi
  - (de facto from 15 September 1962)
- April 1963 – 30 July 1963 Denis Akundji
  - (president of secessionist province of Bumba)
- 23 June 1964 – 10 August 1965 Augustin Engwanda
- 10 August 1965 – 25 April 1966 Denis Sakombi (born 1929, died 1985)
