= Nord-Ubangi =

Province of the Democratic Republic of the Congo

Nord-Ubangi Province du Nord-Ubangi (French)
- Province
- Coordinates: 4°17′N 21°1′E
- Country: DR Congo
- Established: 2015
- Named after: Ubangi River
- Capital: Gbadolite

Government
  - Governor: Jean Bosco Kotongo

Area
  - Total: 56,644 km^{2} (21,870 sq mi)

Population (2020 est.)
  - Total: 1,542,500
  - Density: 27.231/km^{2} (70.529/sq mi)

Ethnic groups
  - Native: Ngbandi • Mbaka • Pagibete • Ngombe • Furu • Banda • Banziri
- Time zone: UTC+1 (WAT)
- License Plate Code: (Democratic Republic of the Congo) CGO / 20
- Official language: French
- National language: Lingala

Nord-Ubangi (French for "North Ubangi") is one of the 21 newest provinces of the Democratic Republic of the Congo created in the 2015 repartitioning. Nord-Ubangi, Équateur, Mongala, Sud-Ubangi, and Tshuapa provinces are the result of the dismemberment of the former Équateur province.

The province is located in the northwestern part of the country on the Ubangi River and was formed from the Nord-Ubangi district and the independently administered city of Gbadolite which became the capital of the new province.

== Administration ==
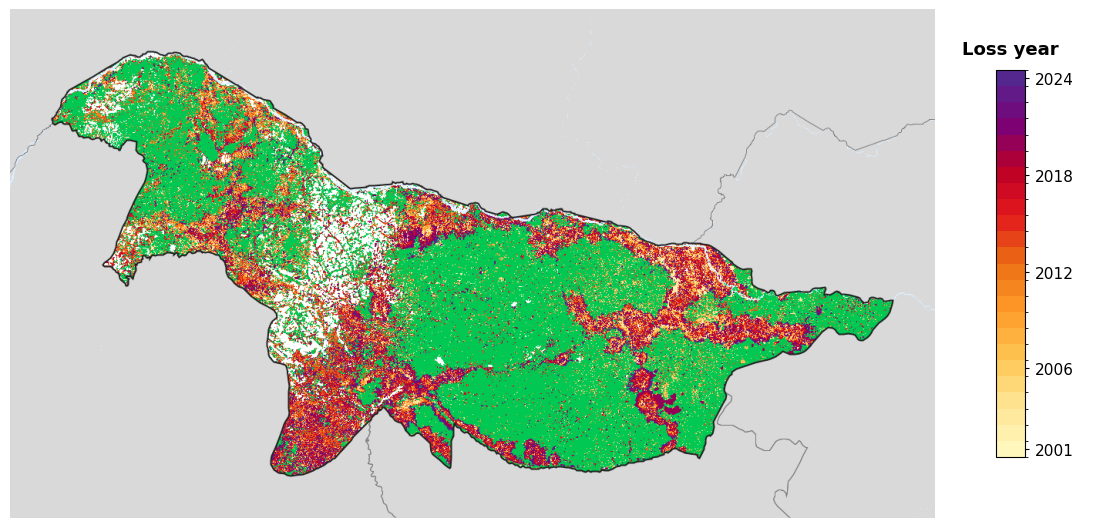
Tree-cover loss year in Nord-Ubangi, 2001-2024, from the Global Forest Change dataset.

Nord-Ubangi is divided in to four territories and one independently administered city.

Administrative division	Type	Map
Gbadolite	City	Gbadolite
Businga	Territory	Businga
Bosobolo	Territory	Bosobolo
Mobayi-Mbongo	Territory	Mobayi-Mbongo
Yakoma	Territory	Yakoma
