= Lomami District =

- District
- Location within Democratic Republic of the Congo
- Coordinates: 6.133333°S 24.483333°E
- Country: Belgian Congo
- Province: Katanga
- District: Lomami

Lomami District (French: District du Lomami, Dutch: District Lomami) was a district of the Belgian Congo from 1912 to 1933, when it was dissolved. It covered very roughly the same area as the present Lomami Province and the northwest of Haut-Lomami Province.

== Location ==
Parts of the Stanley Falls and Lualaba districts were combined to form Katanga in 1910, which was called a vice-government general. An arrêté royal of 28 March 1912 divided the Congo into 22 districts. A map of the colony after this division shows Lomami District bordering Maniema District to the northeast, Tanganika-Moero District to the east, Lulua District to the south, Kasai District to the west and Sankuru District to the northwest. The district was named after the Lomami River, whose upper reaches flowed northward through the district.

Katanga become a vice-government in 1913. It contained the districts of Lomami, Tanganika-Moero, Lulua and Haut-Luapula. In 1933 the provinces were reorganized into six provinces, named after their capitals, and the central government assumed more control. Katanga became Elisabethville Province. The number of districts was reduced to 15, with 102 territories. Lomami was divided among Sankuru District, Lualaba District and Tanganika District.

In 2015 Lomami Province was formed from the Kabinda district and the independently administered city of Mwene-Ditu. The town of Kabinda was elevated to capital city of the new province. Haut-Lomami was formed from the Haut-Lomami district, whose town of Kamina was elevated to capital city of the new province.

== Maps ==
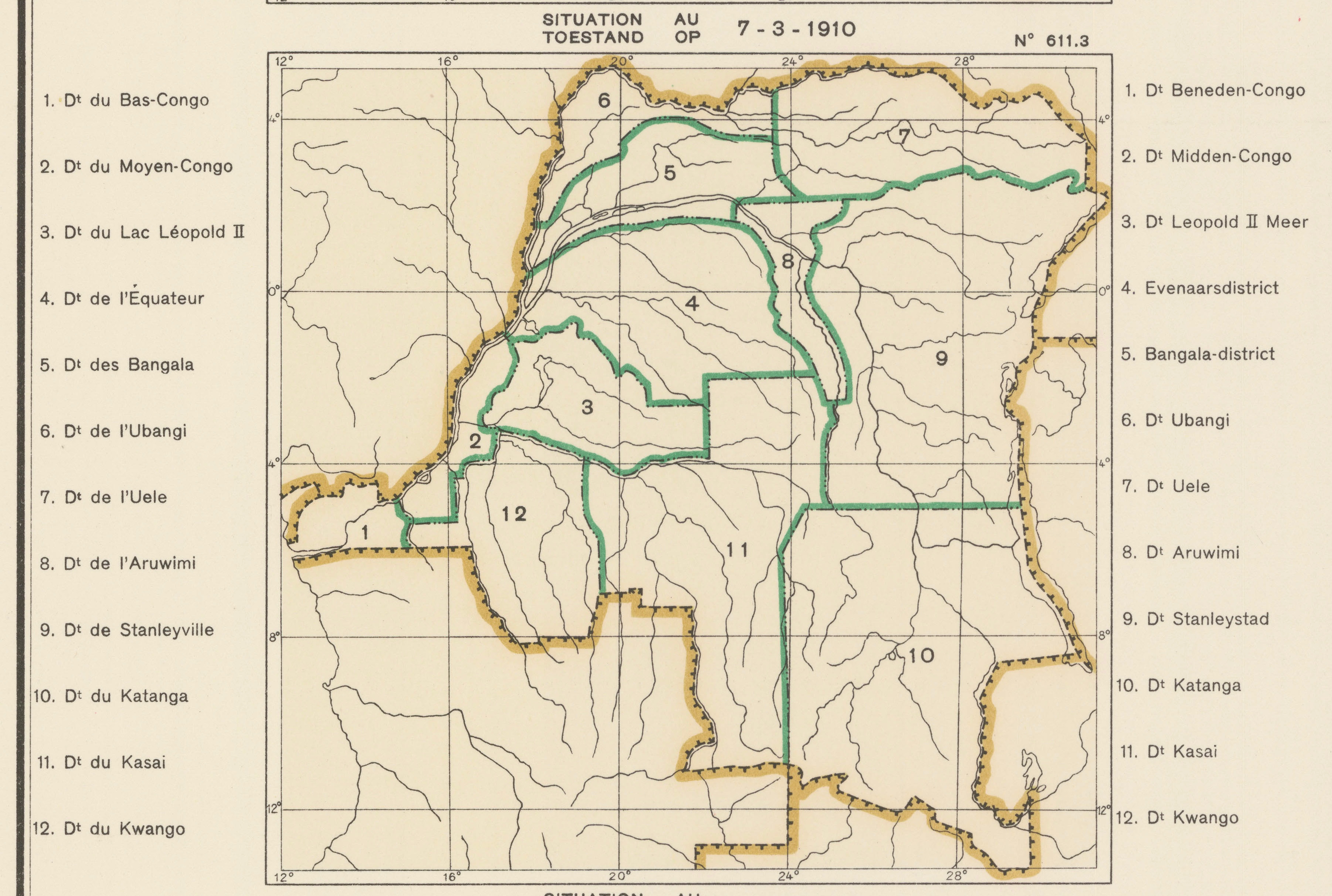
1910 districts after formation of Katanga in the southeast

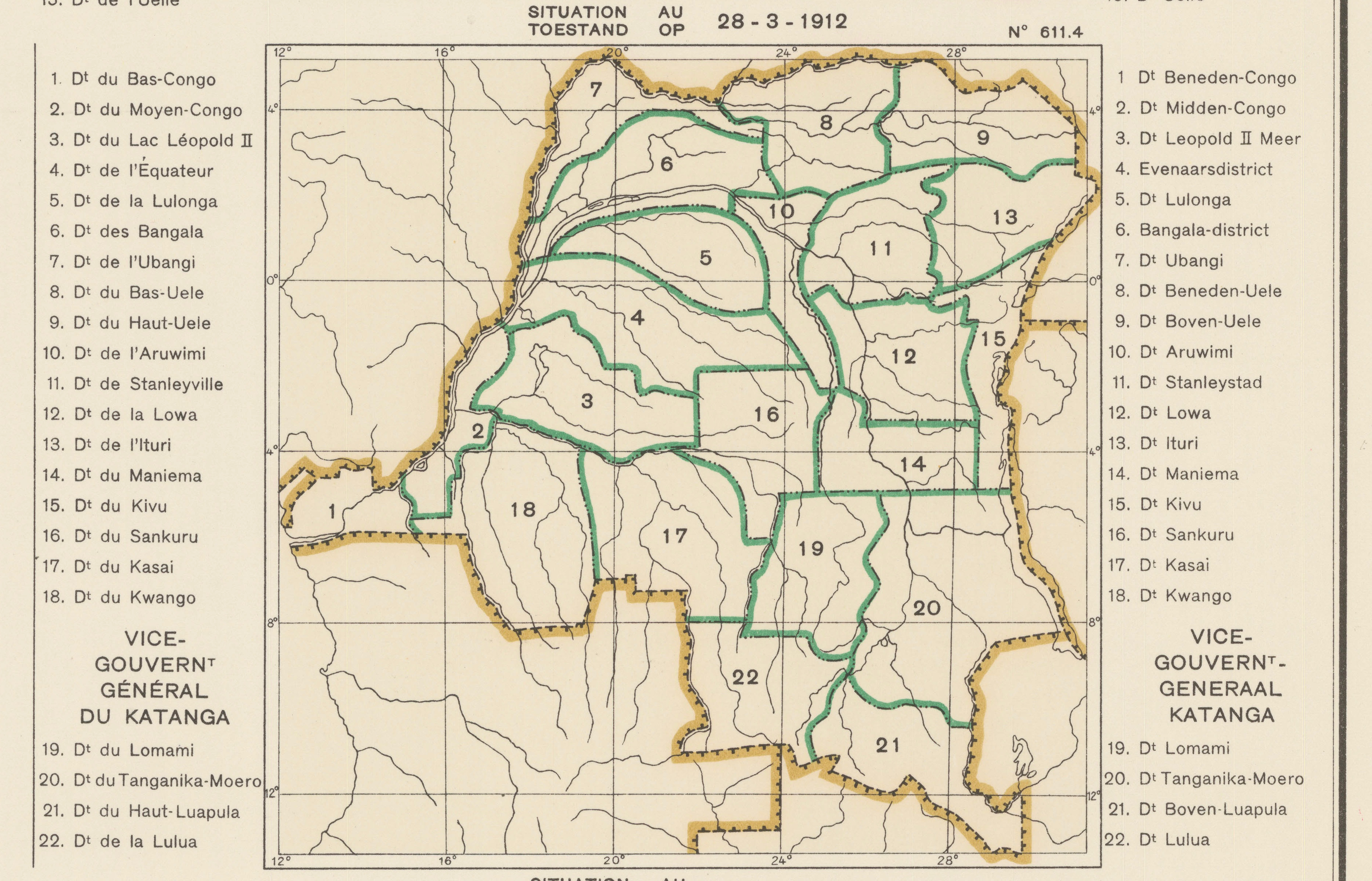
1912 districts including Lomami

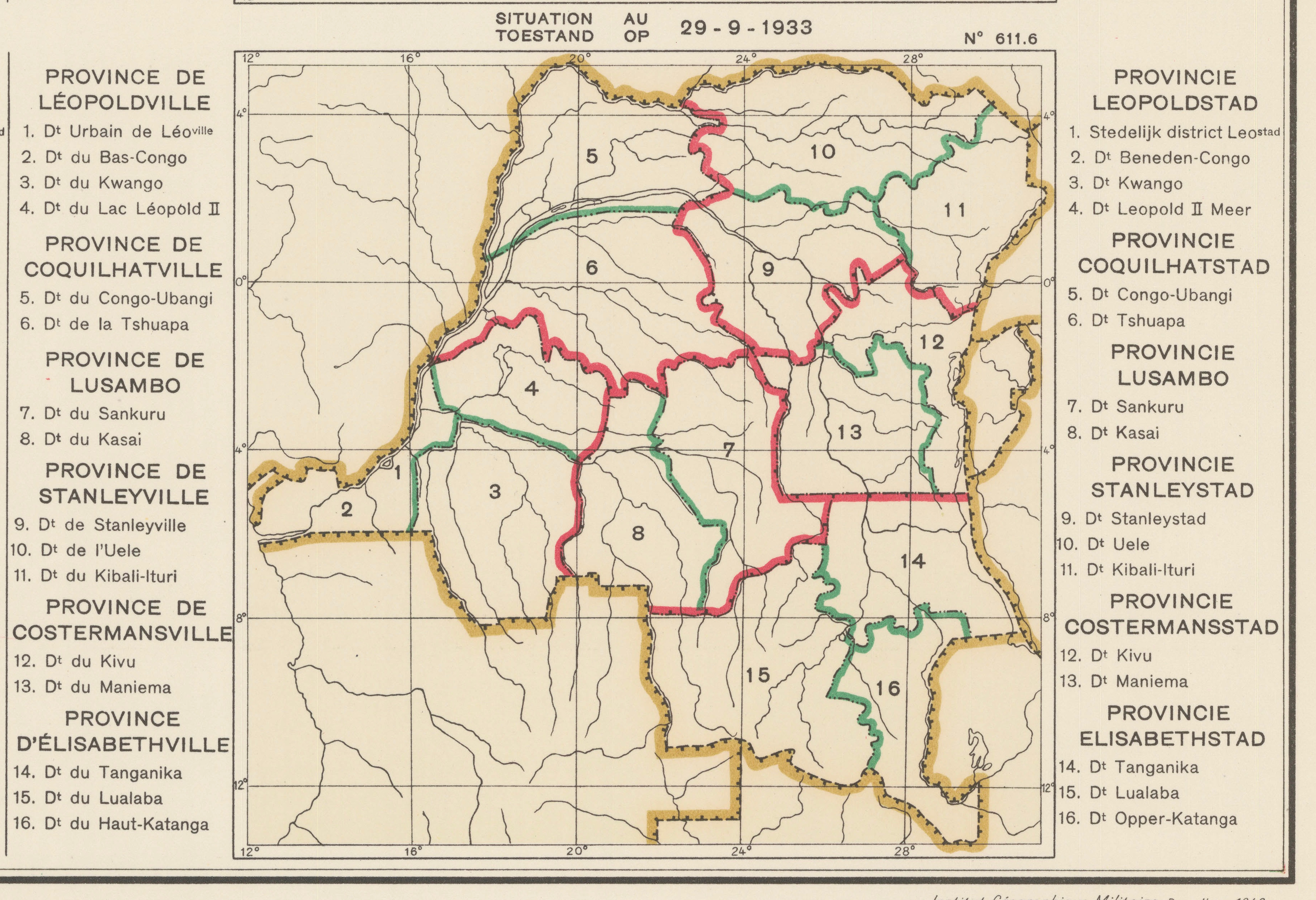
1933 provinces and districts after Lomami was dissolved

The present Lomami Province

The present Haut-Lomami Province

== See also ==
- Districts of the Belgian Congo

== Sources ==
- Atlas général du Congo / Algemene atlas van Congo (in French and Dutch), Belgium: Institut Royal Colonial Belge, 1948–1963, OCLC 681334449
- Bruneau, Jean-Claude (30 June 2009), "Les nouvelles provinces de la République Démocratique du Congo : construction territoriale et ethnicités", L'Espace Politique, 7 (2009–1), doi:10.4000/espacepolitique.1296
- Lemarchand, René (1964), Political Awakening in the Belgian Congo, University of California Press, GGKEY:TQ2J84FWCXN
- "Provinces of the Democratic Republic of Congo". Statiods.com.
