= Lulonga District =

- District
- Location within Democratic Republic of the Congo
- Coordinates: 1.214970°N 19.340849°E
- Country: Belgian Congo
- Province: Orientale
- District: Lulonga

Lulonga District (French: District de la Lulonga, Dutch: District Lulonga) was a district of the Belgian Congo created in 1912 and dissolved in 1933. Today part of Lulonga is in the current province of Équateur, and part in the province of Tshuapa.

== Location ==
Lulonga District was created on 28 March 1912 when an arrêté royal divided the Congo into 22 districts. On this date the Équateur District was divided, with the south becoming a smaller Équateur District and the north becoming Lulonga District. The district is named after the Lulonga River, a left tributary of the Congo River. A map of the colony in 1912 shows Lulonga bordering the smaller Équateur District to the south, Bangala District to the west and north, and Aruwimi District to the east. A map of 1926 shows somewhat different boundaries.

Équateur Province was created in 1917. As of 1926 the province included the districts of Ubangi, Bangala, Lulonga, Équateur and Lac Léopold II. With the reorganization of 1933, Lulonga District was merged into Équateur District to form Tshuapa District in the new Coquilhatville Province. Coquilhatville Province was renamed Équateur Province in 1947.

On 11 July 2015 Équateur Province was divided into the current much smaller Province of Équateur, and the provinces of Mongala, Nord-Ubangi, Sud-Ubangi, and Tshuapa.

== Maps ==
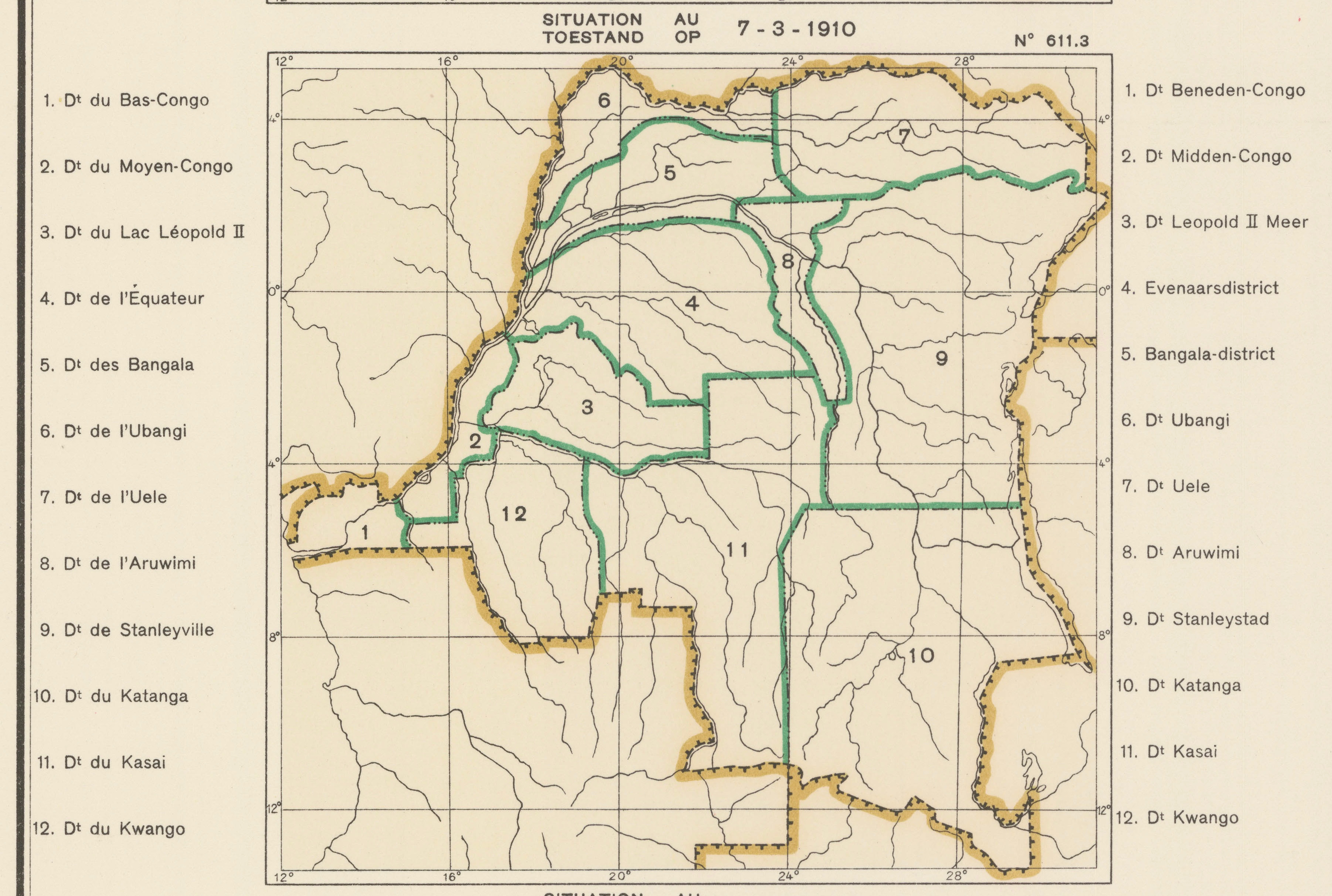
1910 districts

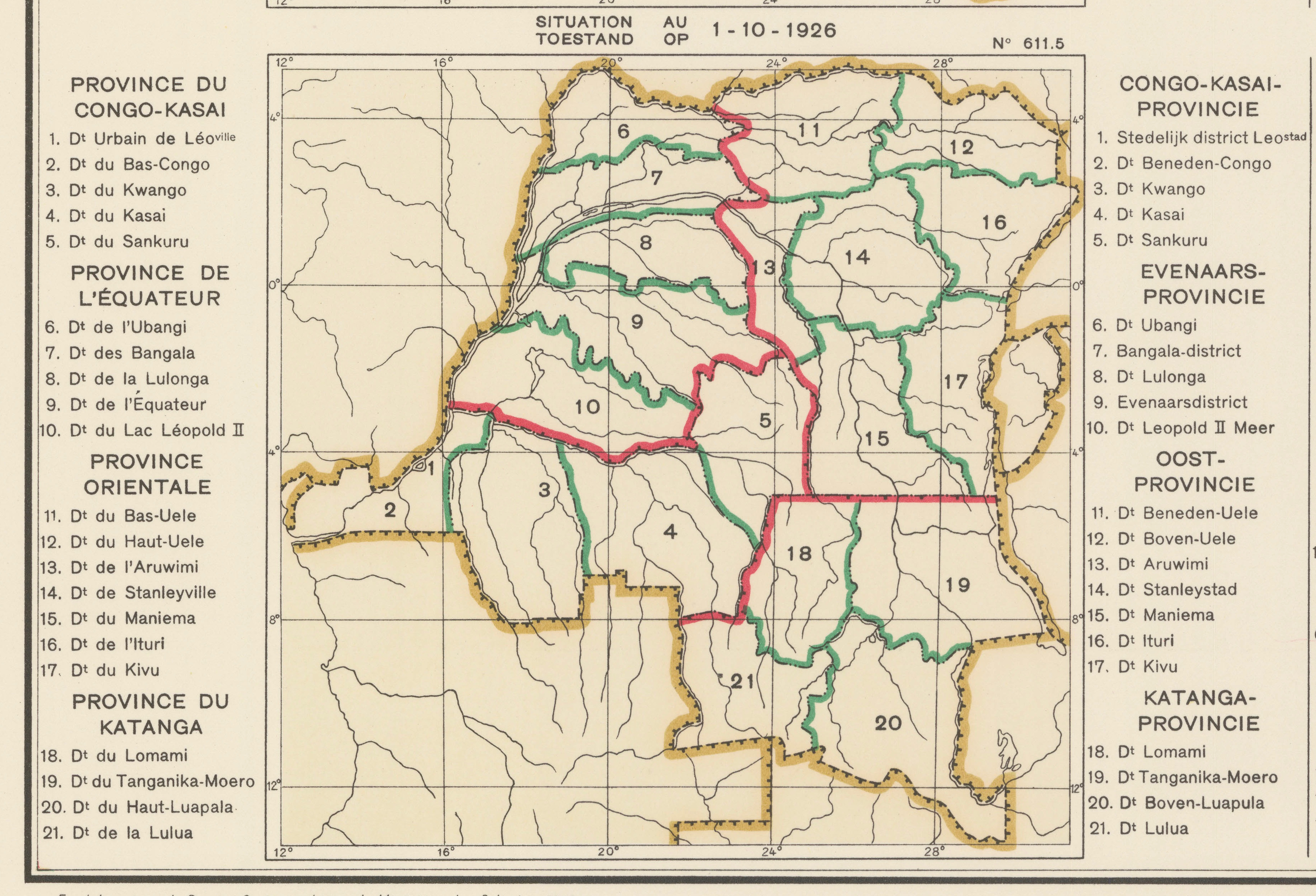
1926 provinces and districts

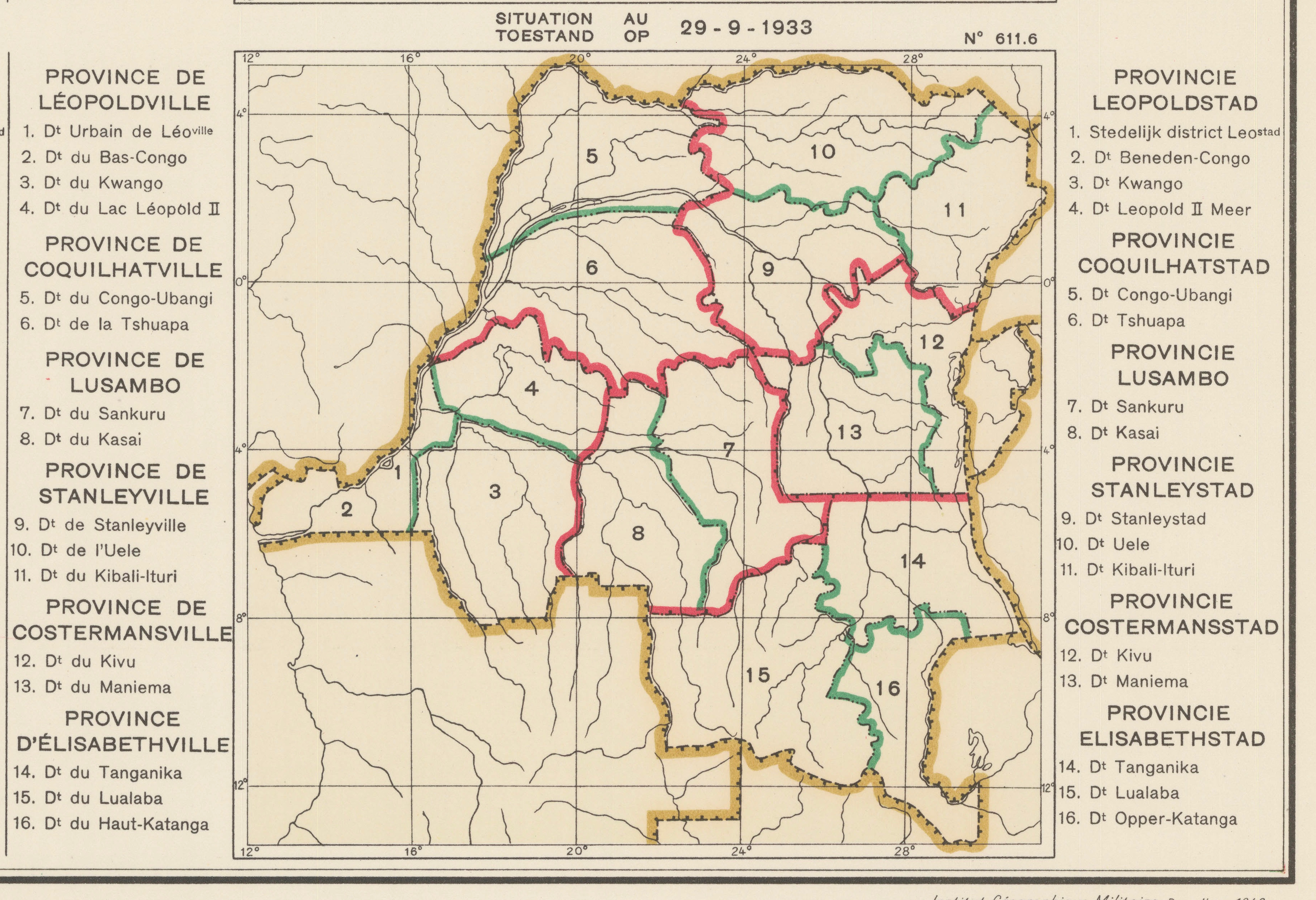
1933 provinces and districts

The current Équateur province

The current Tshuapa province

== See also ==
- Districts of the Belgian Congo

== Sources ==
- Atlas général du Congo / Algemene atlas van Congo (in French and Dutch), Belgium: Institut Royal Colonial Belge, 1948–1963, OCLC 681334449 / http://www.kaowarsom.be/en/online_maps
- "Congo (Kinshasa) Provinces", Rulers.org
- Lemarchand, René (1964), Political Awakening in the Belgian Congo, University of California Press, GGKEY:TQ2J84FWCXN
