= Stanley Pool District =

- District
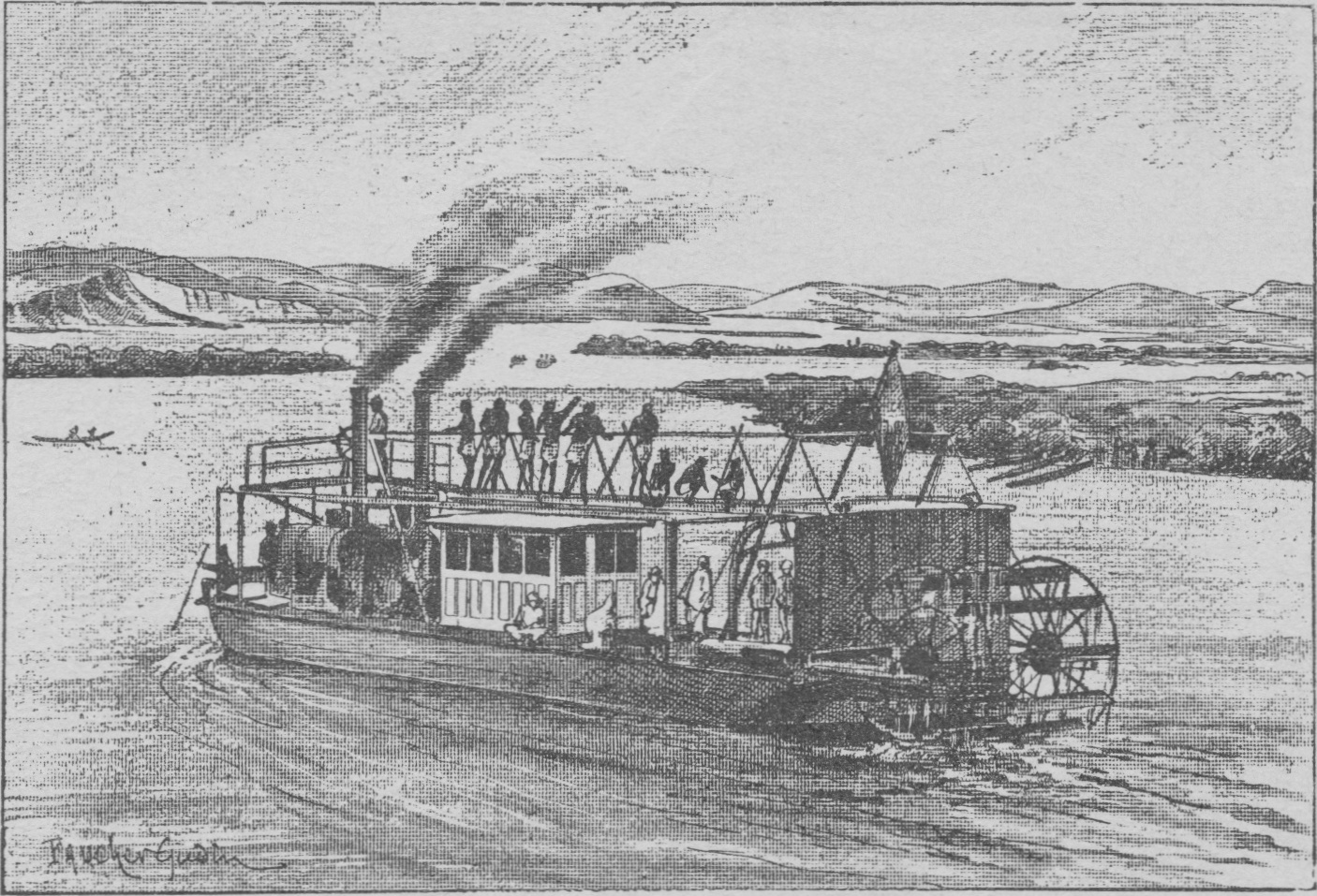
- Steamship "Stanley" on Stanley Pool 1890

- Location within Democratic Republic of the Congo
- Coordinates: 4.331789°S 15.682200°E
- Country: Belgian Congo
- District: Stanley Pool

Stanley Pool District (French: District du Stanley Pool, Dutch: District Stanley Pool), later named Moyen-Congo District was a district of the Congo Free State and Belgian Congo. It disappeared in a reorganization of 1914.

== Congo Free State ==
Article 3 of the decree of 16 April 1887 provided for the Congo Free State to be divided into administrative districts headed by district commissioners, assisted by one or more deputies. The decree of 1 August 1888 divided the Congo Free State into eleven districts, of which the first five were in the lower Congo region, including Stanley Pool District with its headquarters in Léopoldville.

A map of the Congo Free State in 1897 shows the Stanley Pool District stretching along the east bank of the Congo River upstream from the Livingstone Falls past Léopoldville to just south of Lukolela. The district was named after Stanley Pool, a widening of the Congo above Léopoldville. It was bordered to the south by the Cataractes District, to the east by the Kwango, Lualaba Kassai and Lac Léopold II districts, and to the north by Équateur District. The French territories were across the river to the west.

== Belgian Congo ==
The Free State was annexed by Belgium in 1908 as the Belgian Congo. On a 1910 map the Stanley Pool District had been renamed Moyen-Congo District, with various changes to the boundary. It was now bordered by the Bas-Congo District to the south, Kwango and Lac Léopold II districts to the east, and Équateur district to the north. A major reorganization in 1914 adjusted boundaries and grouped the districts into provinces. A 1926 map shows a new urban district of Léopoldville had been created around the capital city, and Moyen-Congo District had been merged into Bas-Congo (south) and Lac Léopold II (north).

== Maps ==
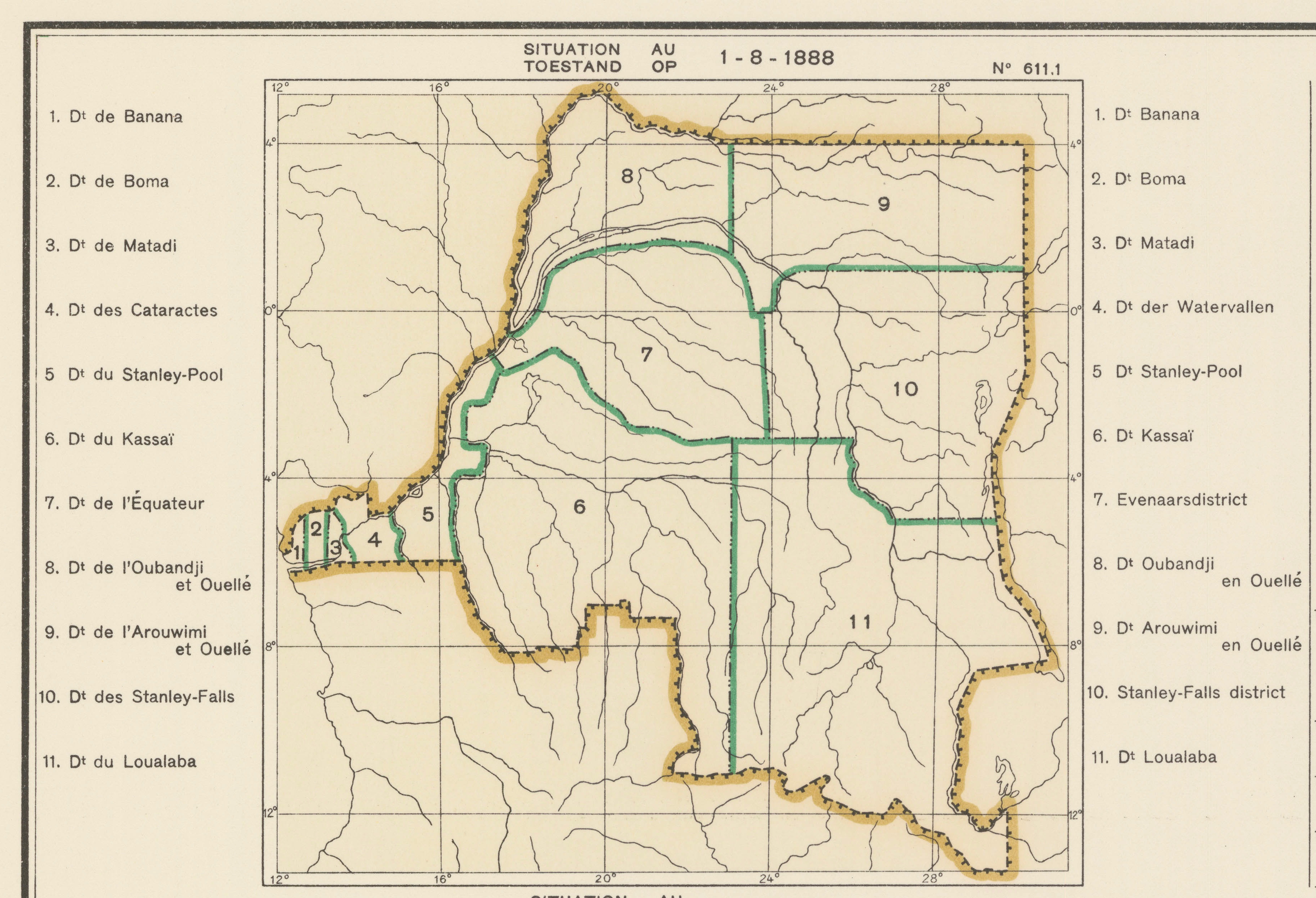
Districts of the Congo Free State in 1888

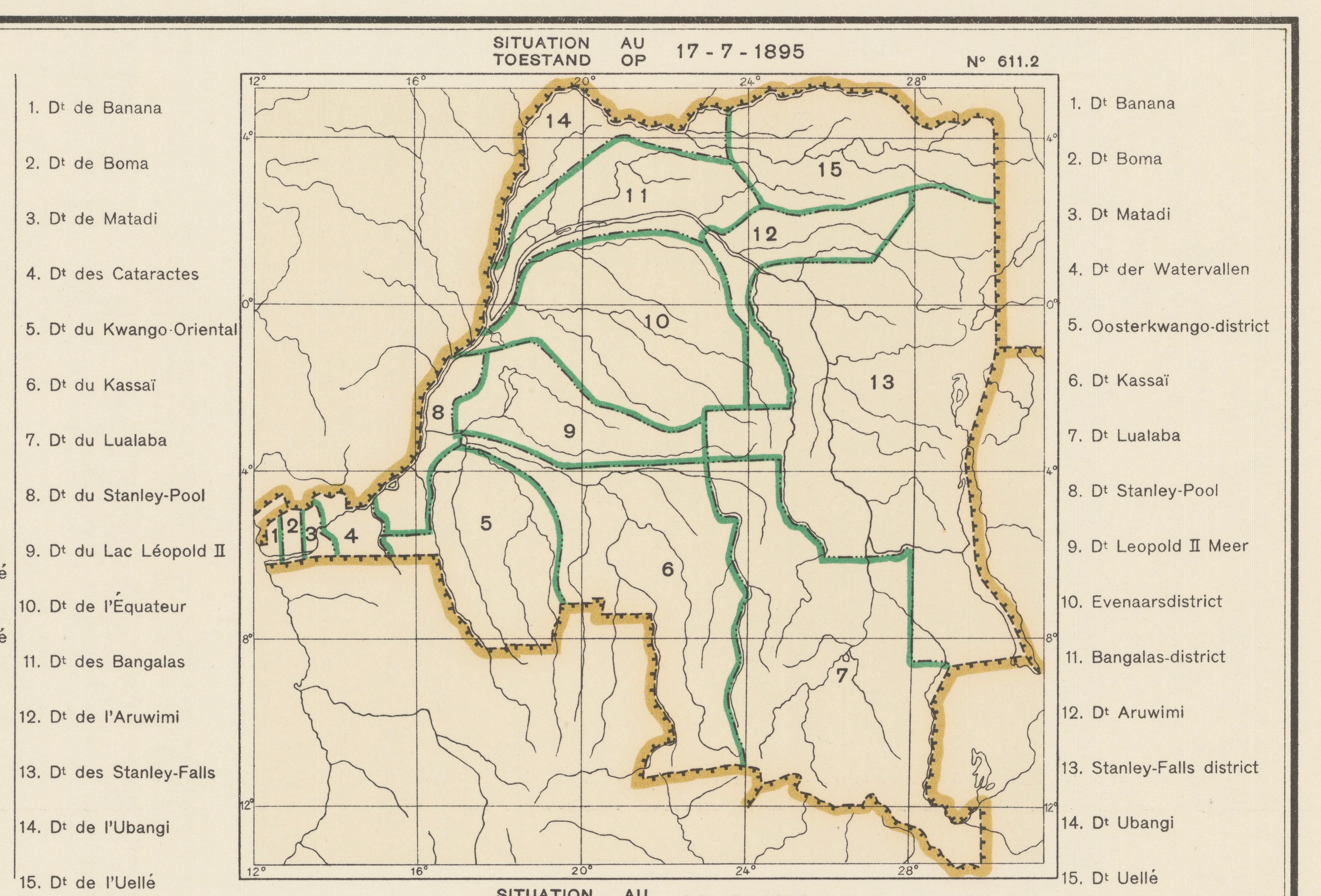
Districts of the Congo Free State in 1895

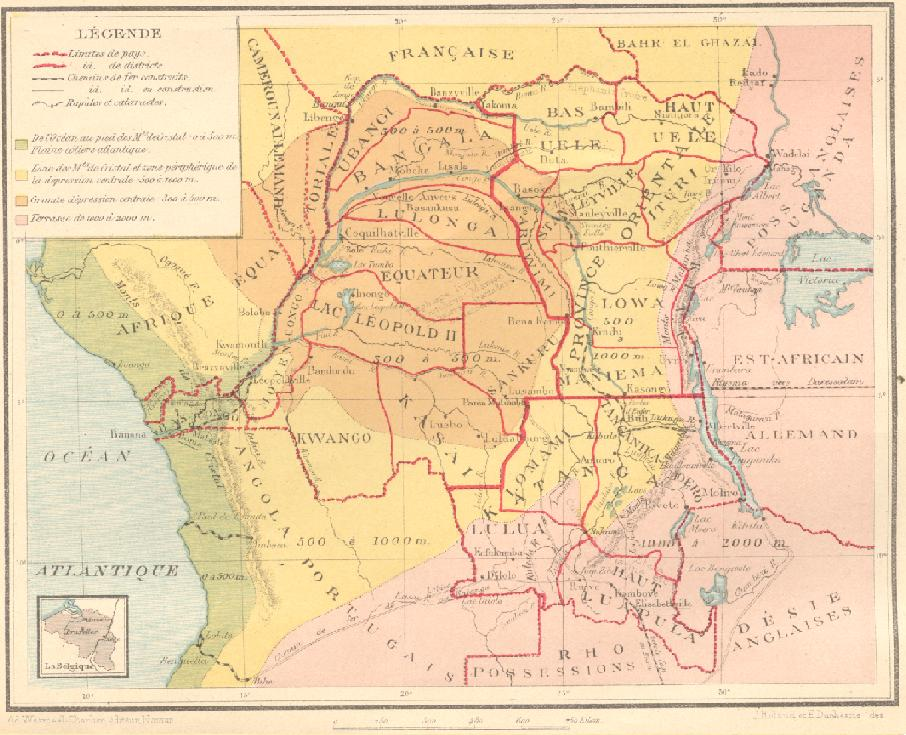
1914 districts. Stanley Pool renamed Moyen Congo

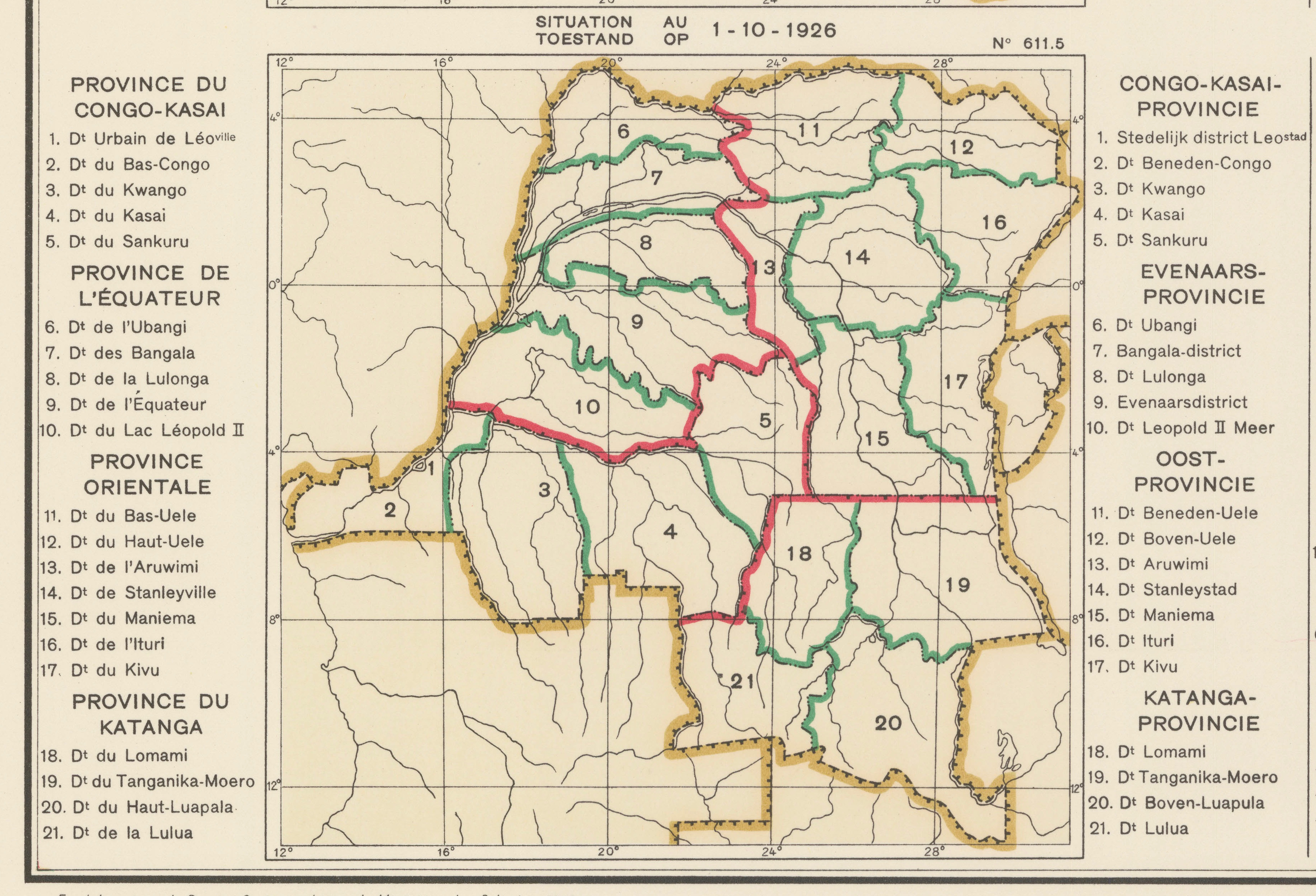
1926 provinces and districts, Moyen Congo dissolved

== See also ==
- Districts of the Congo Free State
- Districts of the Belgian Congo

== Sources ==
- Atlas général du Congo / Algemene atlas van Congo (in French and Dutch), Belgium: Institut Royal Colonial Belge, 1948–1963, OCLC 681334449 / http://www.kaowarsom.be/en/online_maps
- "Congo (Kinshasa) Provinces", Rulers.org
- Lemarchand, René (1964), Political Awakening in the Belgian Congo, University of California Press, GGKEY:TQ2J84FWCXN
- Omasombo Tshonda, Jean (2014), Bas-Uele, Musée royal de l’Afrique centrale, ISBN 978-9-4916-1586-3
- Omasombo Tshonda, Jean (2015), Mongala : Jonction des territoires et bastion d'une identité supra-ethnique (PDF), Musée royal de l’Afrique centrale, ISBN 978-9-4922-4416-1
