= Haut-Luapula District =

- District
- Location within Democratic Republic of the Congo
- Coordinates: 11.666667°S 27.483333°E
- Country: Belgian Congo
- Province: Katanga
- District: Haut-Luapula

Haut-Luapula District (French: District du Haut-Luapula, Dutch: District Boven Luapula) was a district of the Belgian Congo from 1912 to 1933, when it was dissolved. It roughly corresponded to the southern part of the present Haut-Katanga Province.

== Location ==
Parts of the Stanley Falls and Lualaba districts were combined to form Katanga in 1910, which was called a vice-government general. An arrêté royal of 28 March 1912 divided the Congo into 22 districts. A map of the colony after this division shows Haut-Luapula District in the extreme southeast of the province, bordered by British Overseas Territories to the south and east. It was bordered by Tanganika-Moero District to the north and Lulua District to the west. The district was named after the Lualaba River, whose upper reaches flowed northward through the district.

Katanga become a vice-government in 1913. It contained the districts of Lomami, Tanganika-Moero, Lulua and Haut-Luapula. In 1933 the provinces were reorganized into six provinces, named after their capitals, and the central government assumed more control. Katanga became Elisabethville Province. The number of districts in the colony was reduced to 15, with 102 territories. Haut-Luapula was divided between Haut-Katanga District in the east and Lualaba District in the west.

On 11 July 1960, a few days after the Congo Republic had gained independence, the province of Katanga seceded as an independent state. In November 1961 the northern portion was reconquered by the national government and made the province of Nord-Katanga. On 21 January 1963 the remainder of Katanga was reconquered and divided into the provinces of Lualaba and Katanga Oriental. Katanga Oriental corresponded to the Haut-Katanga District. Nord-Katanga, Lualaba and Katanga Oriental were merged back into the province of Katanga on 28 December 1966. In 2015 Haut-Katanga Province was formed from the Haut-Katanga District and the independently administered cities of Likasi and Lubumbashi. Lubumbashi retained its status as a provincial capital.

== Maps ==
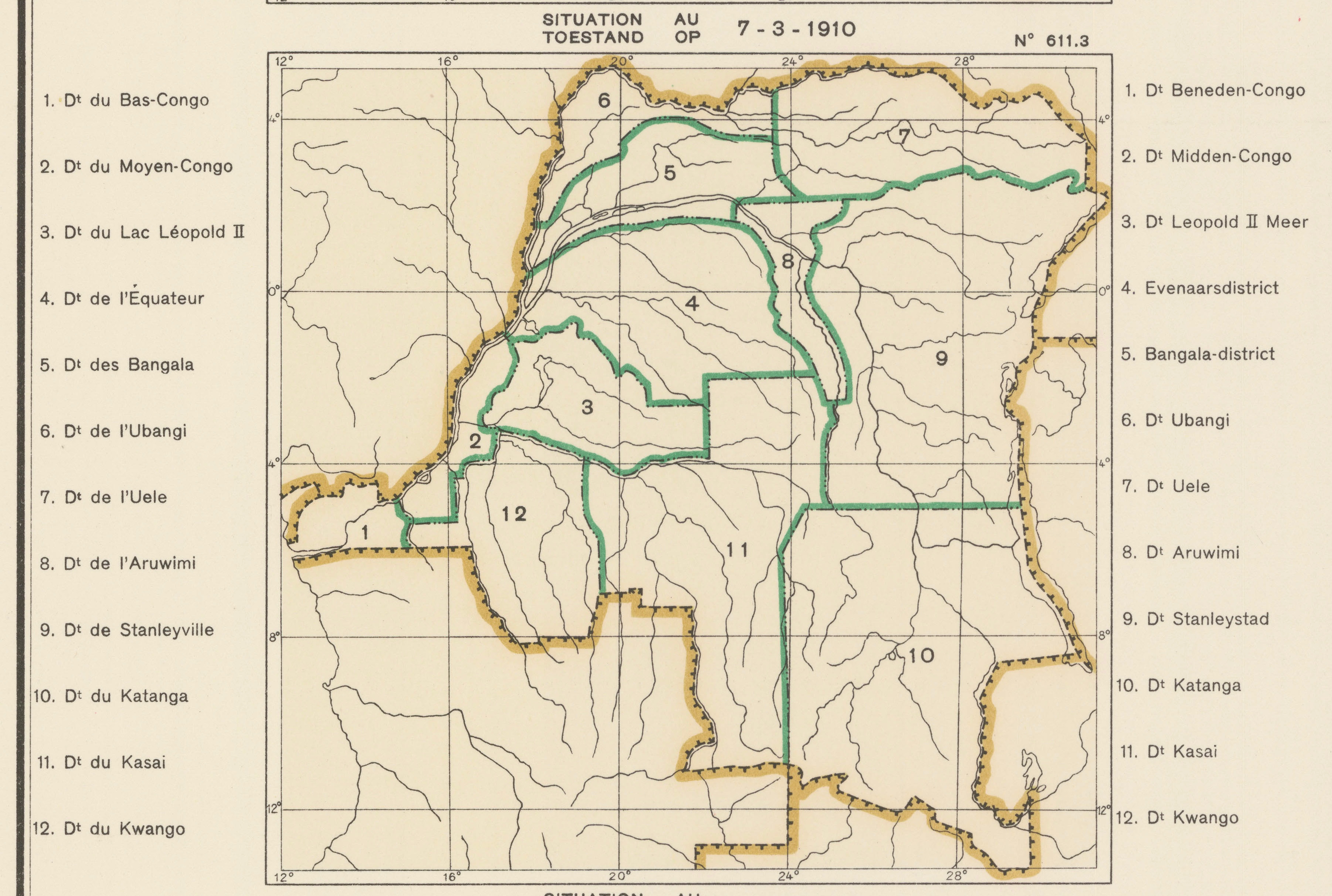
1910 districts after formation of Katanga in the southeast

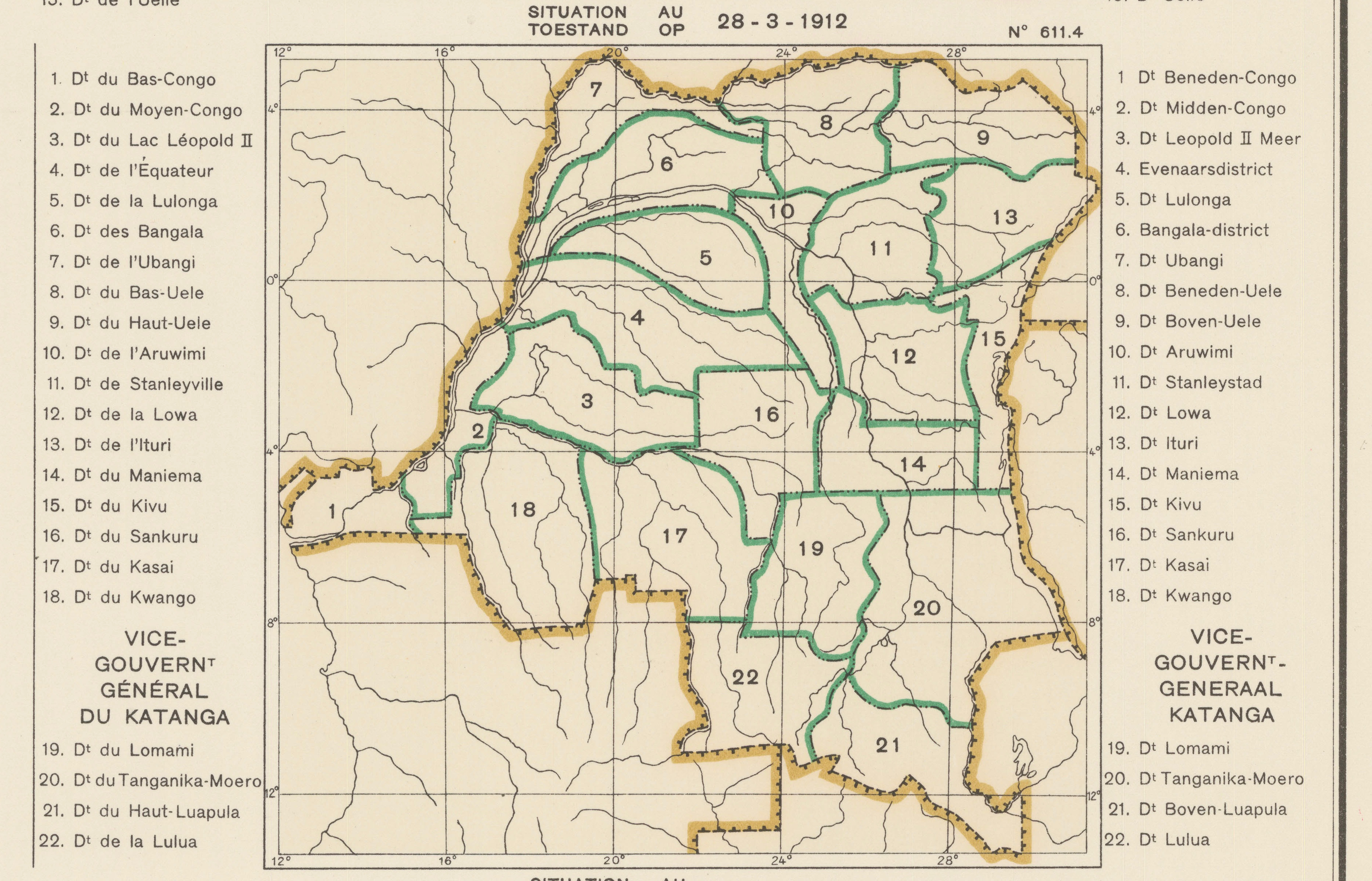
1912 districts including Haut-Luapula in the extreme southeast

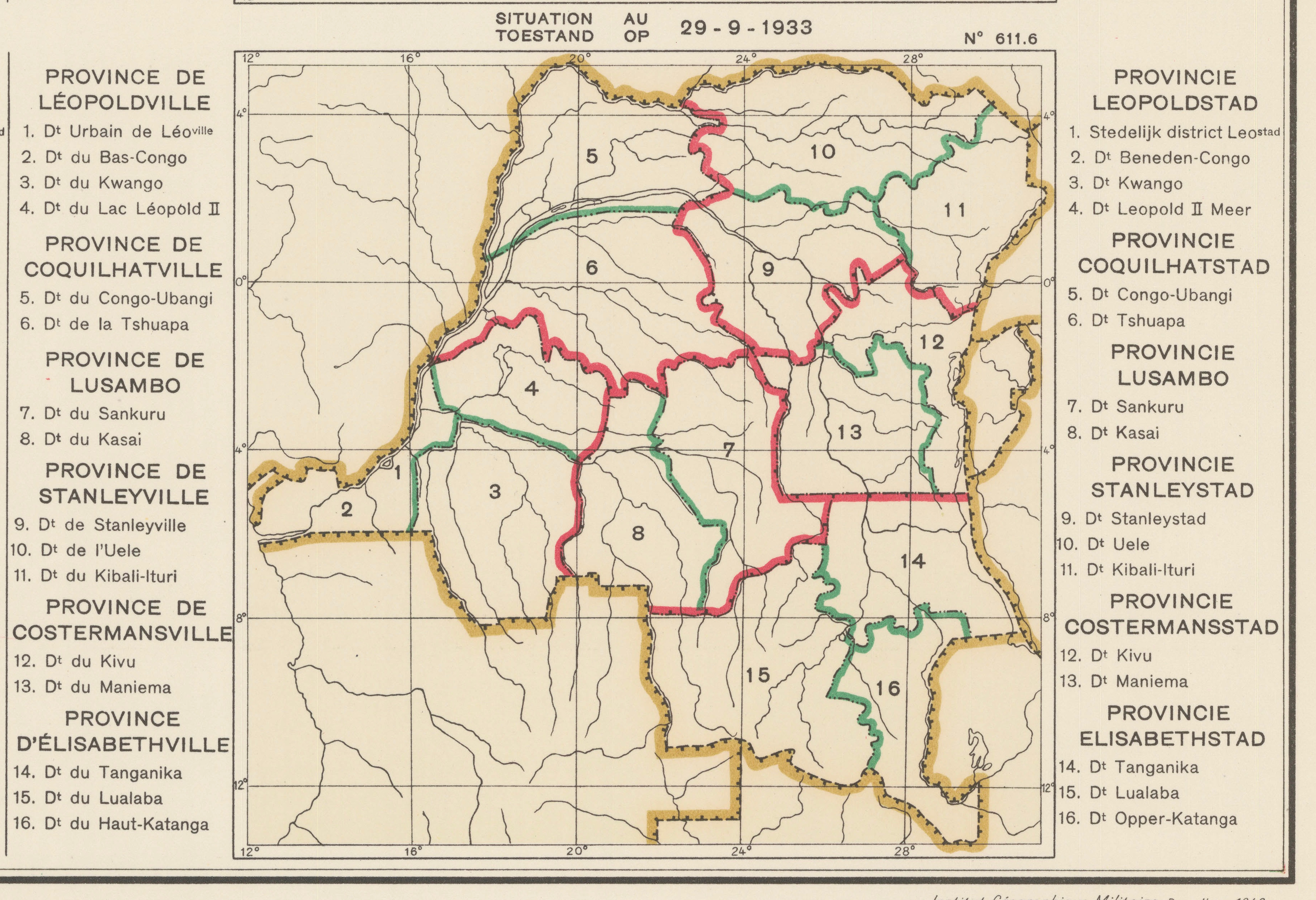
1933 provinces and districts after Haut-Luapula was dissolved

The present Haut-Katanga Province

== See also ==
- Districts of the Belgian Congo

== Sources ==
- Atlas général du Congo / Algemene atlas van Congo (in French and Dutch), Belgium: Institut Royal Colonial Belge, 1948–1963, OCLC 681334449
- Bruneau, Jean-Claude (30 June 2009), "Les nouvelles provinces de la République Démocratique du Congo : construction territoriale et ethnicités", L'Espace Politique, 7 (2009–1), doi:10.4000/espacepolitique.1296
- "Congo (Kinshasa) Provinces", Rulers.org
- Lemarchand, René (1964), Political Awakening in the Belgian Congo, University of California Press, GGKEY:TQ2J84FWCXN
- "Provinces of the Democratic Republic of Congo". Statiods.com.
