= Tanganika-Moero District =

- District
- Location within Democratic Republic of the Congo
- Coordinates: 5.916667°S 29.2°E
- Country: Belgian Congo
- Province: Katanga
- District: Tanganika-Moero

Tanganika-Moero District (French: District du Tanganika-Moero, Dutch: District Tanganika-Moero) was a district of the Belgian Congo from 1912 to 1933, when it was dissolved. It roughly corresponded to the present Tanganyika Province and the northern part of Haut-Katanga Province.

== Location ==
Parts of the Stanley Falls and Lualaba districts were combined to form Katanga in 1910, which was called a vice-government general. An arrêté royal of 28 March 1912 divided the Congo into 22 districts. A map of the colony after this division shows Tanganika-Moero District bordered by British territories and Lake Tanganyika to the east, Kivu and Maniema districts to the north, Lomami and Lulua districts to the west and Haut-Luapula District to the south. The district was named after Lake Tanganyika and Lake Mweru, which bordered the district to the east and south respectively.

Katanga become a vice-government in 1913. It contained the districts of Lomami, Tanganika-Moero, Lulua and Haut-Luapula. In 1933 the provinces were reorganized into six provinces, named after their capitals, and the central government assumed more control. Katanga became Elisabethville Province. The number of districts in the colony was reduced to 15, with 102 territories. The northern part of Tanganika-Moero became Tanganika District, while the southern part was absorbed by Haut-Katanga District.

On 11 July 1960, a few days after the Congo Republic had gained independence, the province of Katanga seceded as an independent state. In November 1961 the northern portion was reconquered by the national government and made the province of Nord-Katanga. On 21 January 1963 the remainder of Katanga was reconquered and divided into the provinces of Lualaba and Katanga Oriental. Nord-Katanga, Lualaba and Katanga Oriental were merged back into the province of Katanga on 28 December 1966. In 2015 Tanganyika Province was formed from the Tanganyika district, whose town of Kalemie was elevated to capital city of the new province.

== Maps ==
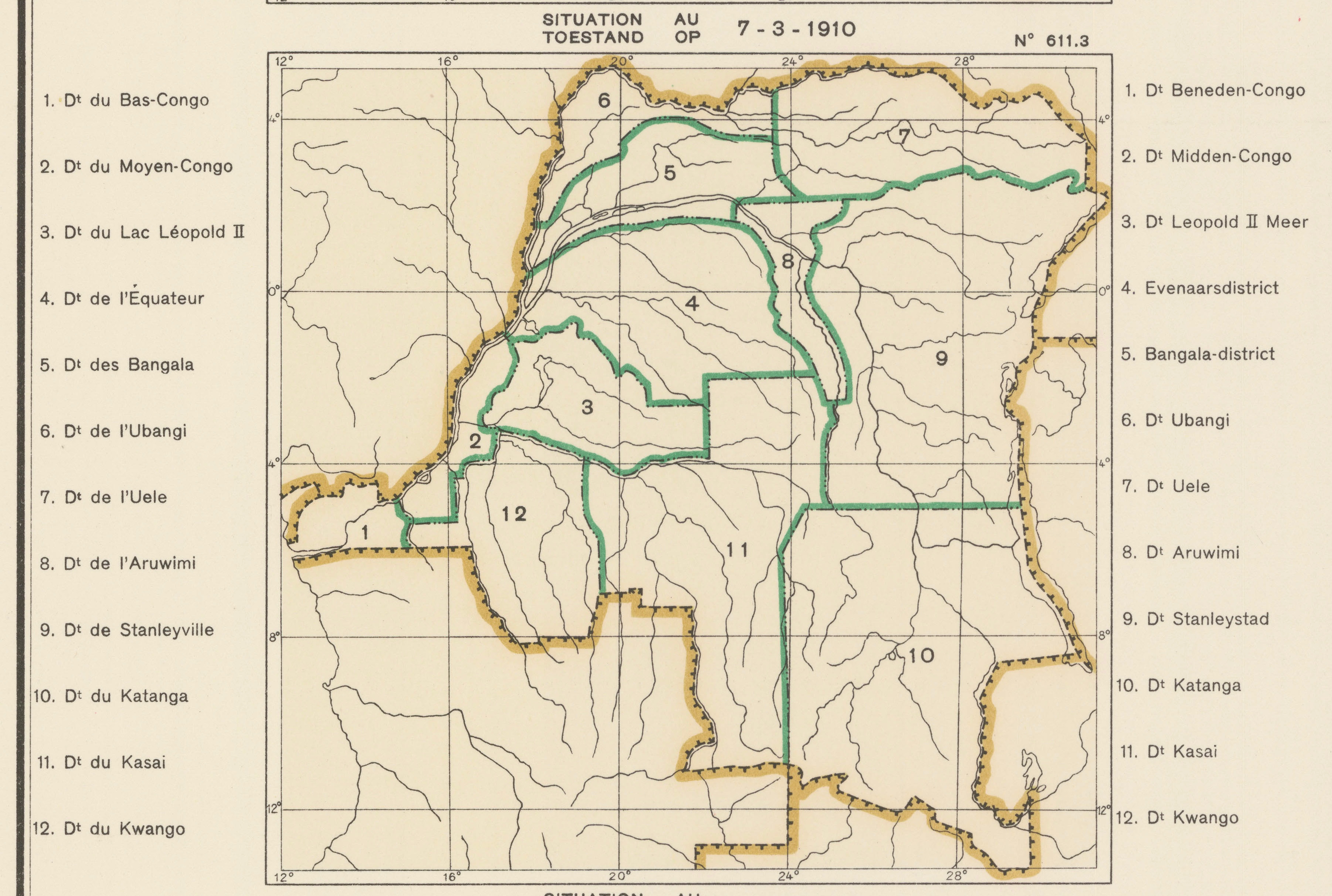
1910 districts after formation of Katanga in the southeast

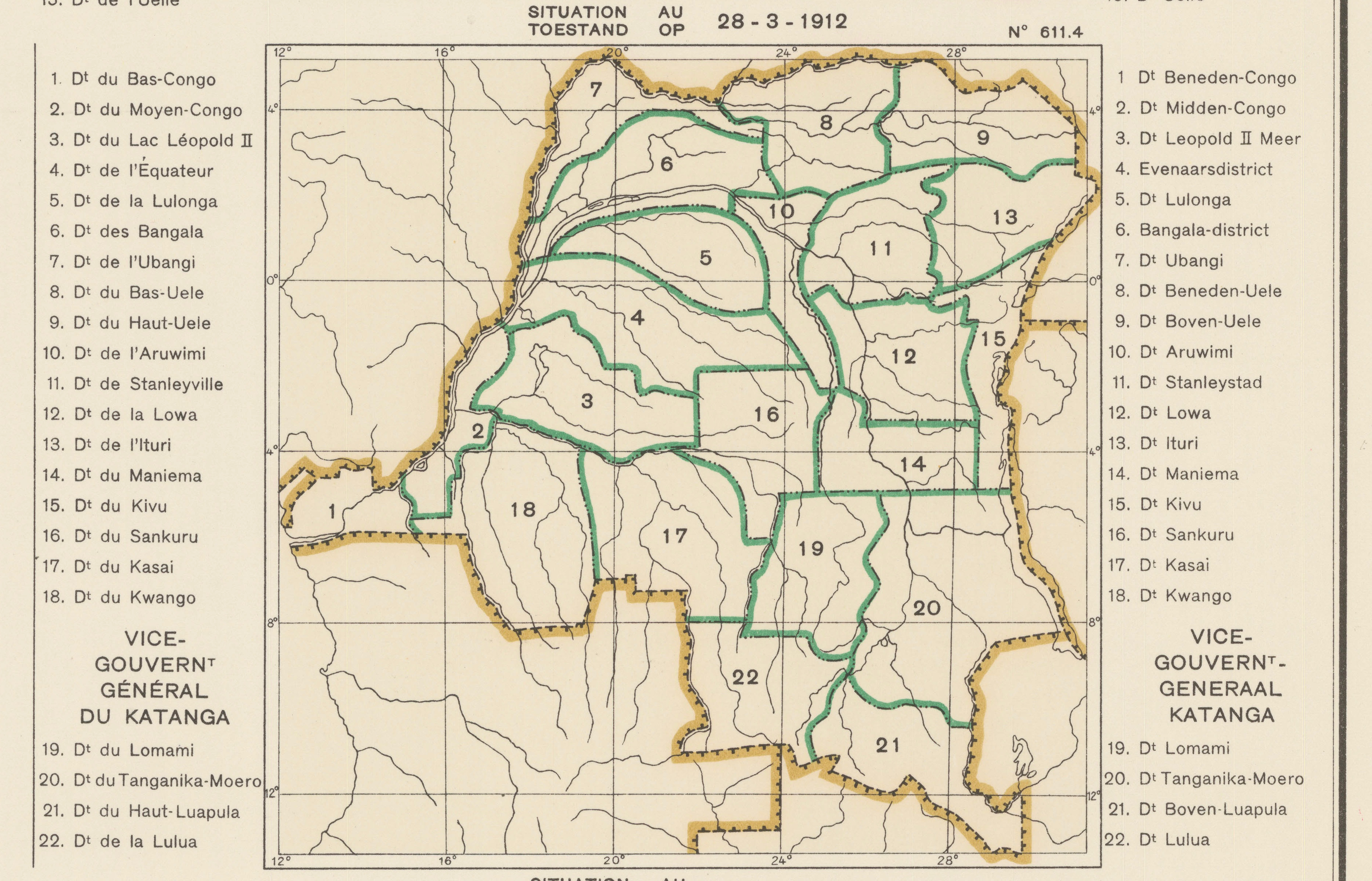
1912 districts including Tanganika-Moero in the northeast of Katanga

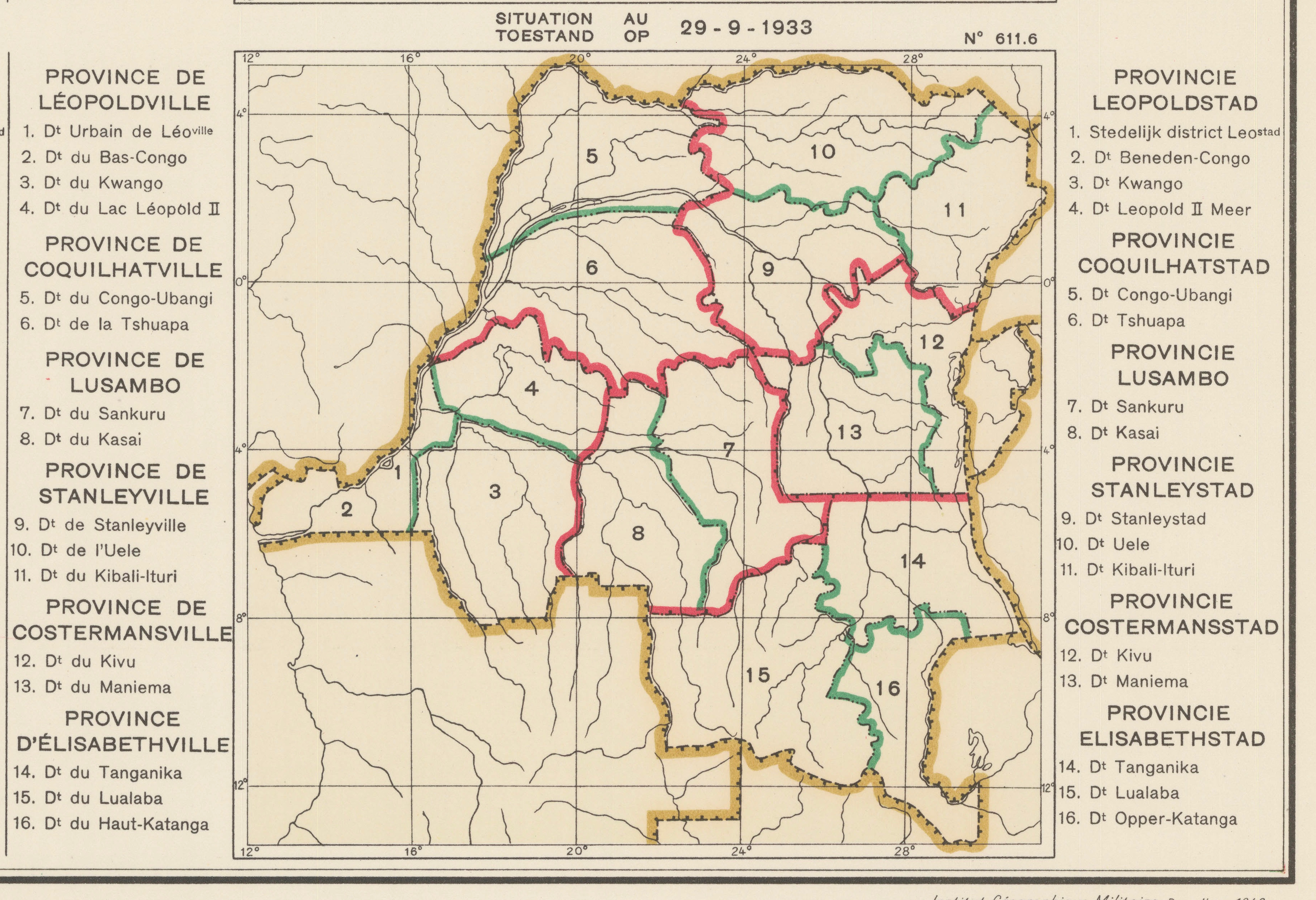
1933 provinces and districts after Haut-Luapula was dissolved

The present Tanganyika Province

The present Haut-Katanga Province

== See also ==
- Districts of the Belgian Congo

== Sources ==
- Atlas général du Congo / Algemene atlas van Congo (in French and Dutch), Belgium: Institut Royal Colonial Belge, 1948–1963, OCLC 681334449
- Bruneau, Jean-Claude (30 June 2009), "Les nouvelles provinces de la République Démocratique du Congo : construction territoriale et ethnicités", L'Espace Politique, 7 (2009–1), doi:10.4000/espacepolitique.1296
- "Congo (Kinshasa) Provinces", Rulers.org
- Lemarchand, René (1964), Political Awakening in the Belgian Congo, University of California Press, GGKEY:TQ2J84FWCXN
