= Cataractes District =

- District
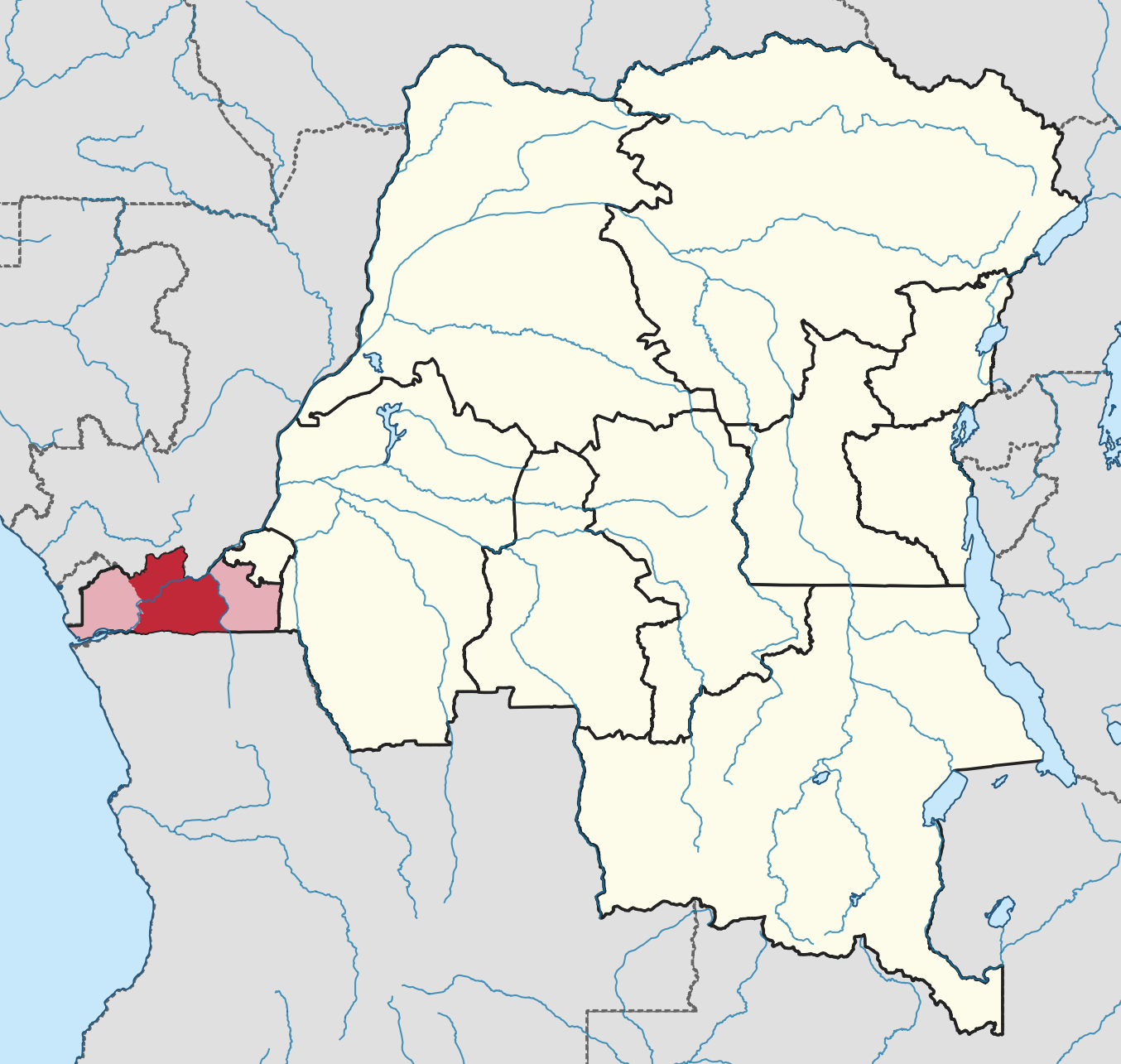
- Cataractes district of Kongo-Central province (2014)
- Coordinates: 5.25°S 14.87°E
- Country: Democratic Republic of the Congo
- Province: Kongo Central
- District: Cataractes

Cataractes District was a district located in the Kongo Central province, in the Democratic Republic of the Congo. It dated back to the days of the Congo Free State and the Belgian Congo.

== History ==
Article 3 of the decree of 16 April 1887 provided for the Congo Free State to be divided into administrative districts headed by district commissioners, assisted by one or more deputies. The decree of 1 August 1888 divided the Congo Free State into eleven districts, of which the first five were in the lower Congo region, including Cataractes District with its headquarters at Lukunga.

Cataractes District is shown on a map of the colony in 1897 as bordered by French possessions to the north and Portuguese possessions to the south. It lay between Matadi District to the west and Stanley Pool District to the east. Other maps show an extension of Kwango-Oriental District reaching the southeast of Cataractes District. In 1910 the districts of Banana, Boma, Matadi and Cataracts were consolidated into the Bas-Congo District.

In 1933 the original four provinces of the Belgian Congo were reorganized into six provinces, named after their capitals, and the central government assumed more control. Congo-Kasaï province was split, with the western part renamed Léopoldville Province. The number of districts was reduced to 15. Léopoldville Province contained the urban district of Léopoldville and the districts of Bas-Congo, Kwango and Lac Léopold II. Some of the districts were later divided up. A 1955-1957 map shows Cataractes District extending east from a greatly reduced Bas-Congo District and northeast along the Congo River past the urban district of Léopoldville up to Lac Léopold II District. It bordered Kwango District and Kwilu District to the east. The area was 44,600 square kilometres (17,200 sq mi) out of a total of 357,700 square kilometres (138,100 sq mi) for Léopoldville province as a whole.

== Maps ==
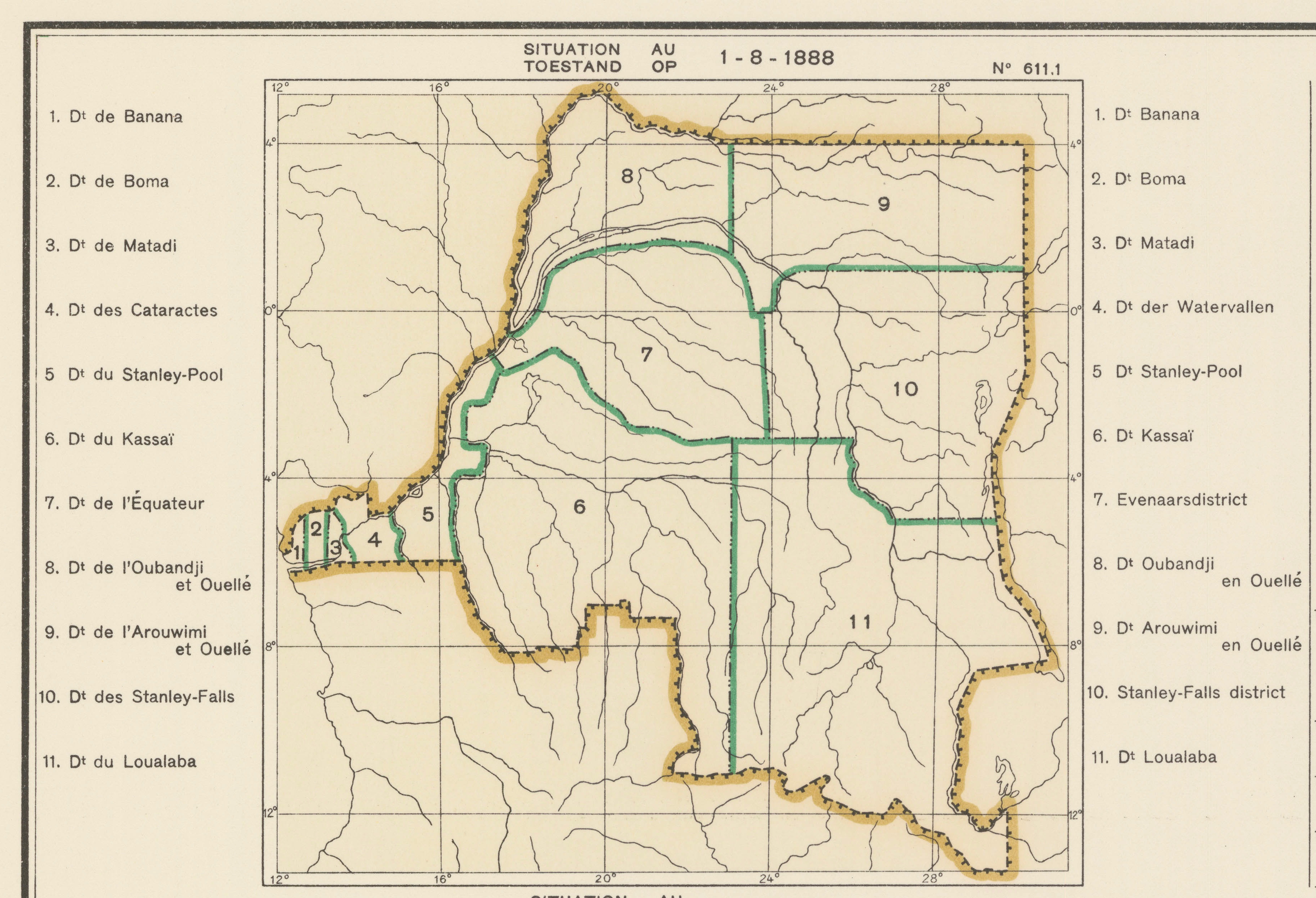
Districts of the Congo Free State in 1888. The small western districts were Banana, Boma, Matadi and Cataractes

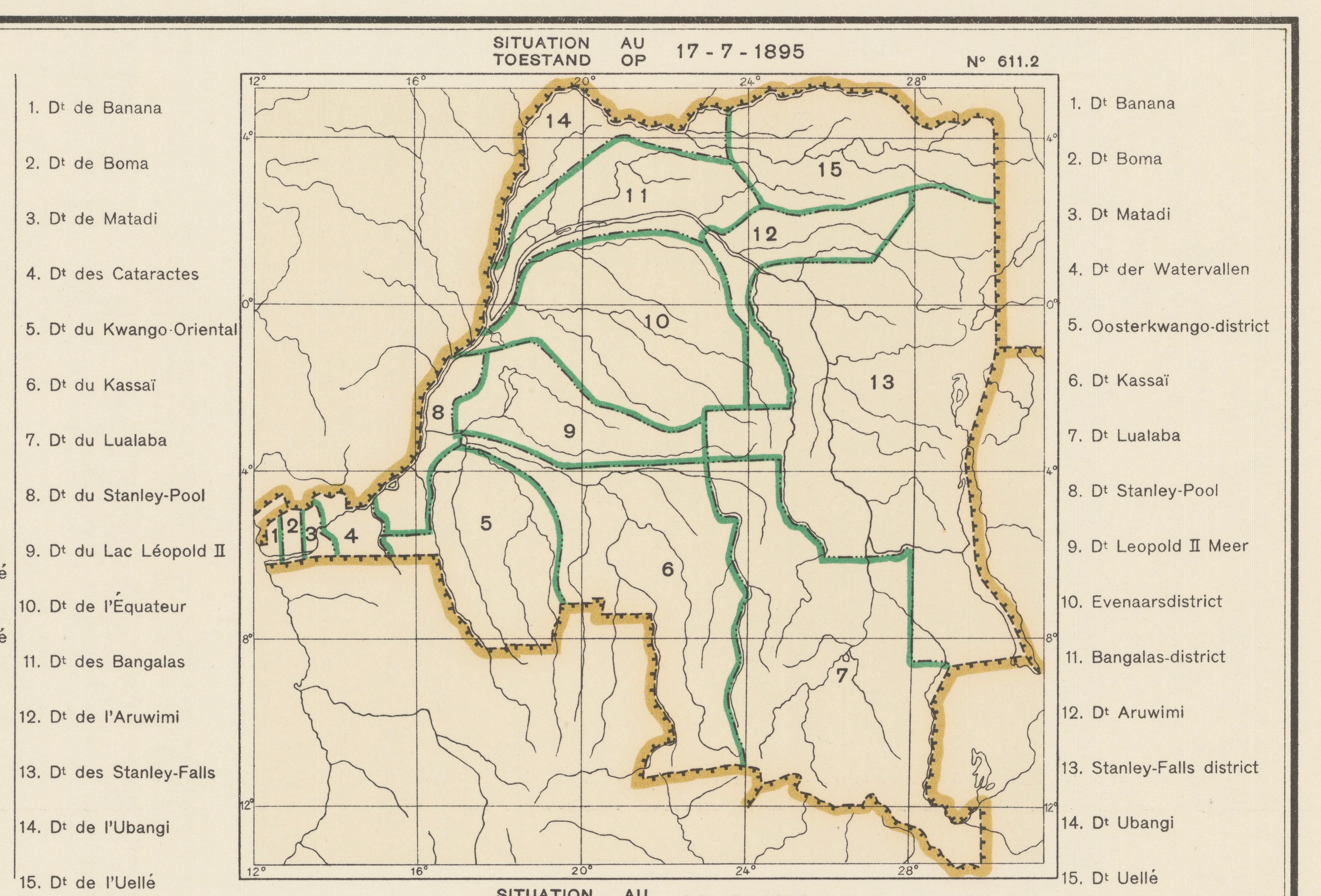
Districts of the Congo Free State in 1895.

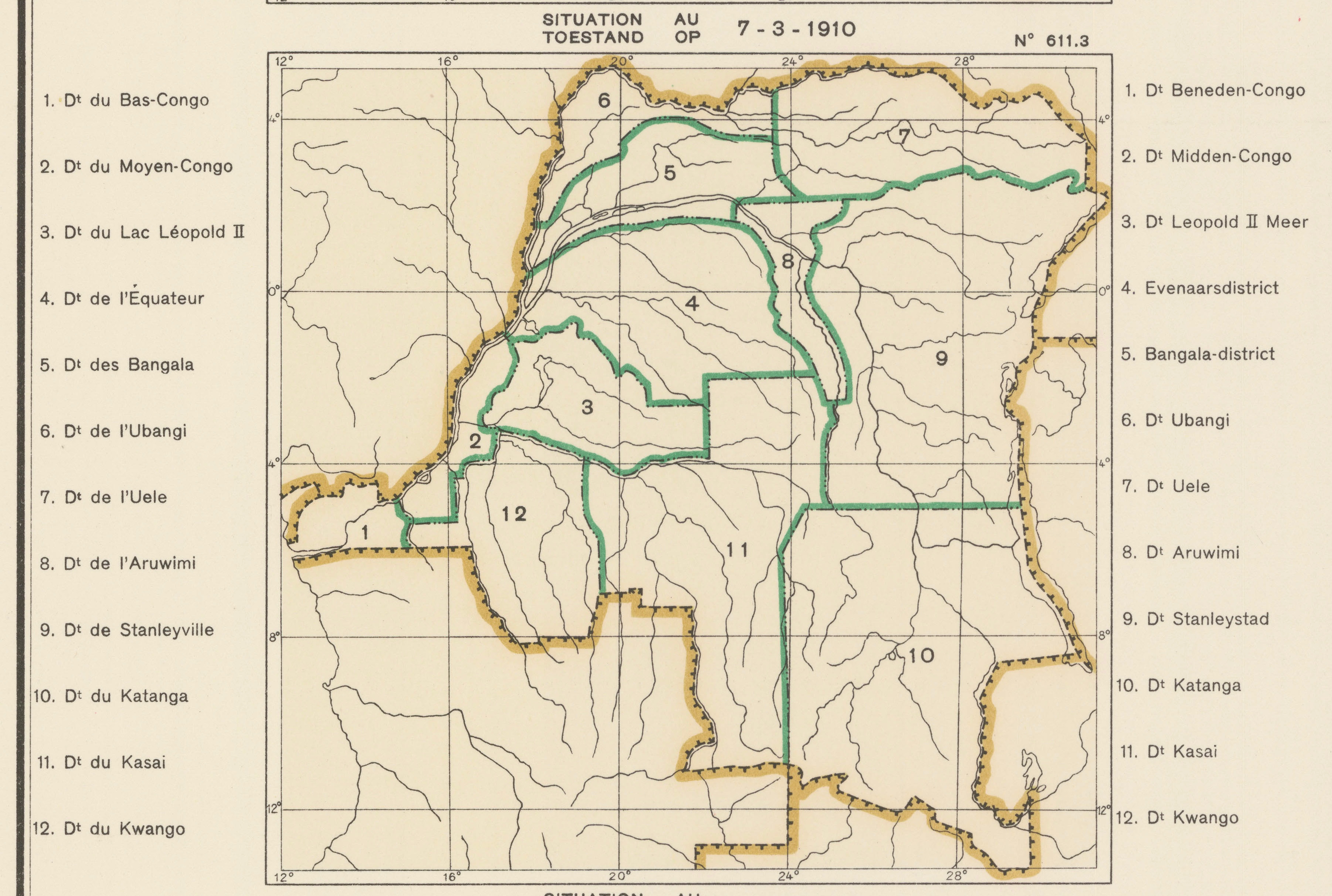
1910 districts

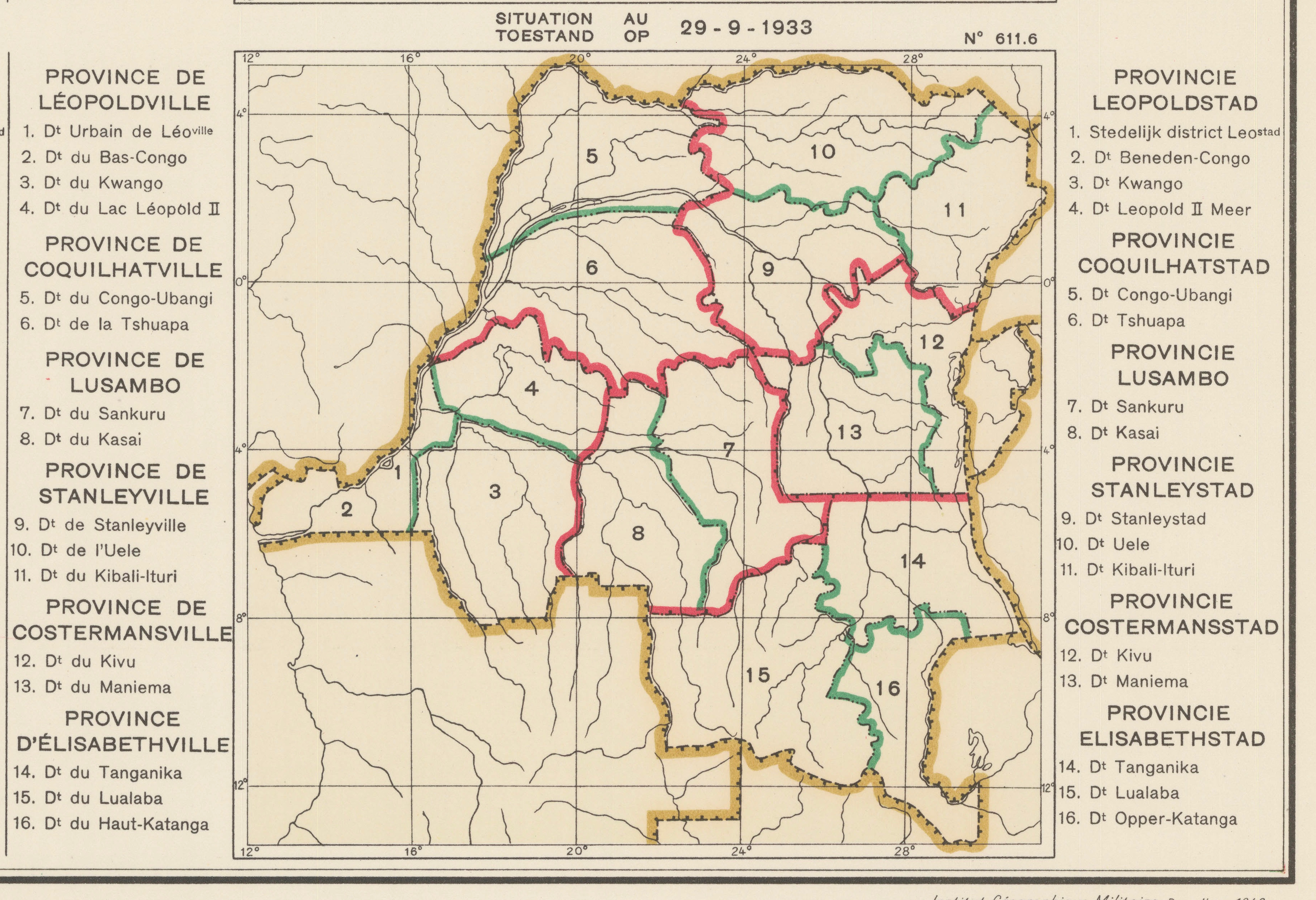
1933 districts. The greater part of Bas Congo district later became Cataracts District.

== See also ==
- Districts of the Congo Free State
- Districts of the Belgian Congo
- Districts of the Democratic Republic of the Congo

== Sources ==
- Atlas général du Congo / Algemene atlas van Congo (in French and Dutch), Belgium: Institut Royal Colonial Belge, 1948–1963, OCLC 681334449
- Brass, William (8 December 2015), Demography of Tropical Africa, Princeton University Press, ISBN 978-1-4008-7714-0
- Bruneau, Jean-Claude (30 June 2009), "Les nouvelles provinces de la République Démocratique du Congo : construction territoriale et ethnicités", L'Espace Politique, 7 (2009–1), doi:10.4000/espacepolitique.1296
- Lemarchand, René (1964), Political Awakening in the Belgian Congo, University of California Press, GGKEY:TQ2J84FWCXN
- Omasombo Tshonda, Jean (2014), Bas-Uele, Musée royal de l’Afrique centrale, ISBN 978-9-4916-1586-3
- Omasombo Tshonda, Jean (2015), Mongala : Jonction des territoires et bastion d'une identité supra-ethnique (PDF), Musée royal de l’Afrique centrale, ISBN 978-9-4922-4416-1
