= Districts of the Belgian Congo =

Belgian Congo c. 1954 showing the main language groups in each region

The Districts of the Belgian Congo were the primary administrative divisions when Belgium annexed the Congo Free State in 1908, each administered by a district commissioner. In 1914 they were distributed among four large provinces, with some boundary changes. In 1933 the provinces were restructured into six, again with boundary changes. The number of districts fluctuated between 12 and 26 through splits and consolidations, first rising, then falling, then rising again.

== History ==
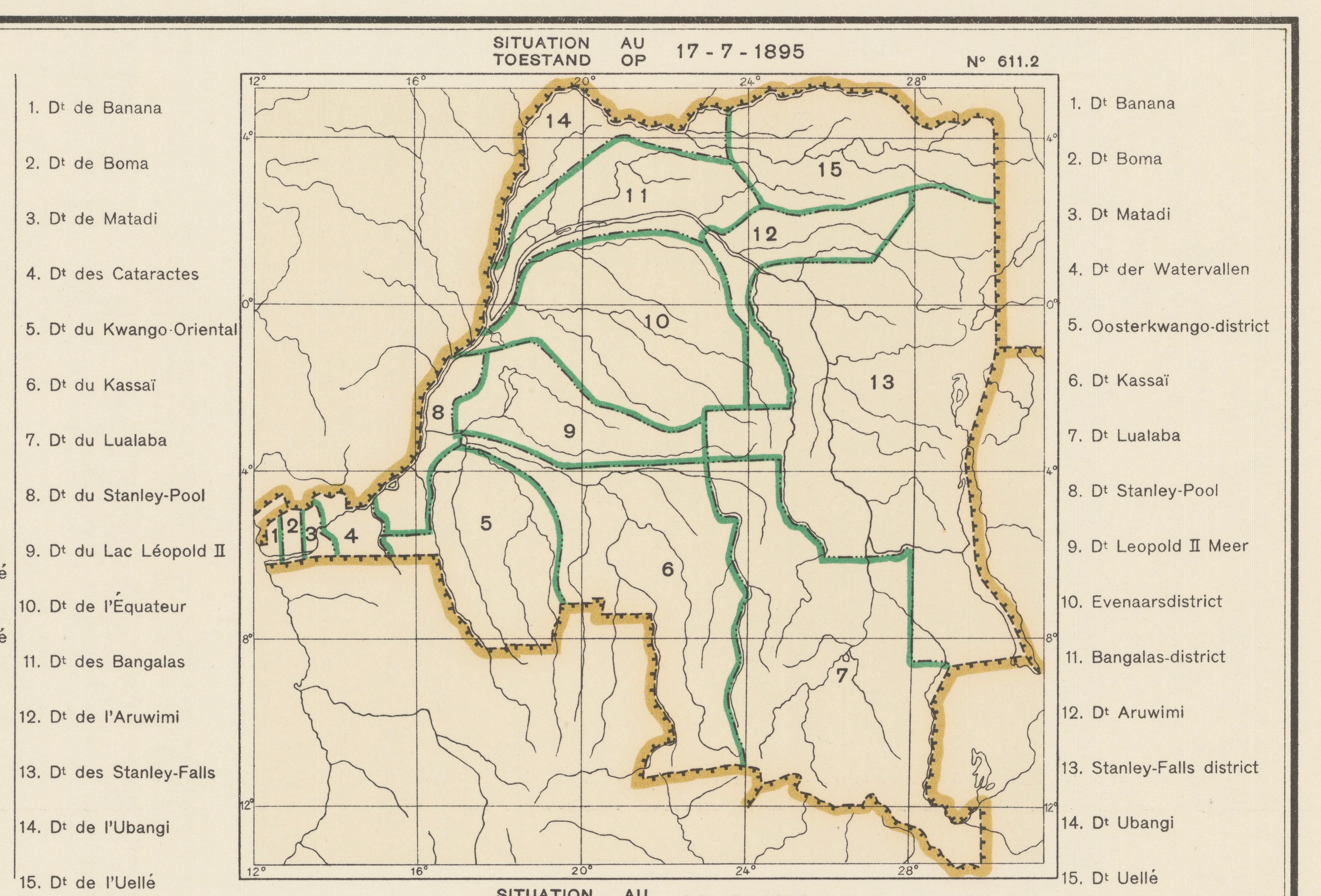
Districts of the Congo Free State in 1895

The Congo Free State was annexed by Belgium in 1908 to become the Belgian Congo. At first the structure of districts was retained. In 1910 the western districts of Banana, Boma, Matadi and Cataractes were consolidated into one administrative unit, Bas-Congo, reducing the number to twelve. Parts of the Stanley Falls and Lualaba districts were combined to form Katanga in 1910, which was called a vice-government general. Otherwise, the Free State districts were maintained until 28 March 1912. An arrêté royal of 28 March 1912 divided the Congo into 22 districts.

An arrêté royal of 28 July 1914 grouped the districts into the provinces of Congo-Kasaï, Équateur, Orientale Province and Katanga, with the objective of improving responsiveness through decentralization. The consolidation had in fact started in Katanga in 1912 and Orientale in 1913, but Congo-Kasai did not formally become a vice-government until 1919. Each of the new provinces was made up of several of the existing districts. The colonial administrators felt the need to assign the many diverse ethnic groups to defined territories, where before they had often been mobile. The districts were divided into territories, which in turn were divided into sectors, and many chiefdoms were recognized. Several of the smallest might be combined into one sector, while the largest chiefdoms were split across sectors.

The original four provinces had considerable autonomy, but in 1933 they were reorganized into six provinces, named after their capitals, and the central government assumed more control. The Congo-Kasaï and Orientale provinces were both split, and some other adjustments were made to form six provinces named after their capitals; Léopoldville, Lusambo (Kasai), Costermansville (Kivu), Elisabethville (Katanga), Stanleyville (Orientale) and Coquilhatville (Équateur). The number of districts was reduced to 15, with 102 territories. Provincial boundaries remained fairly stable until after independence in 1960. There continued to be frequent adjustments to district and territory boundaries, mostly to recognise sectional and tribal divisions. By 1956 there were 26 districts and 135 territories.

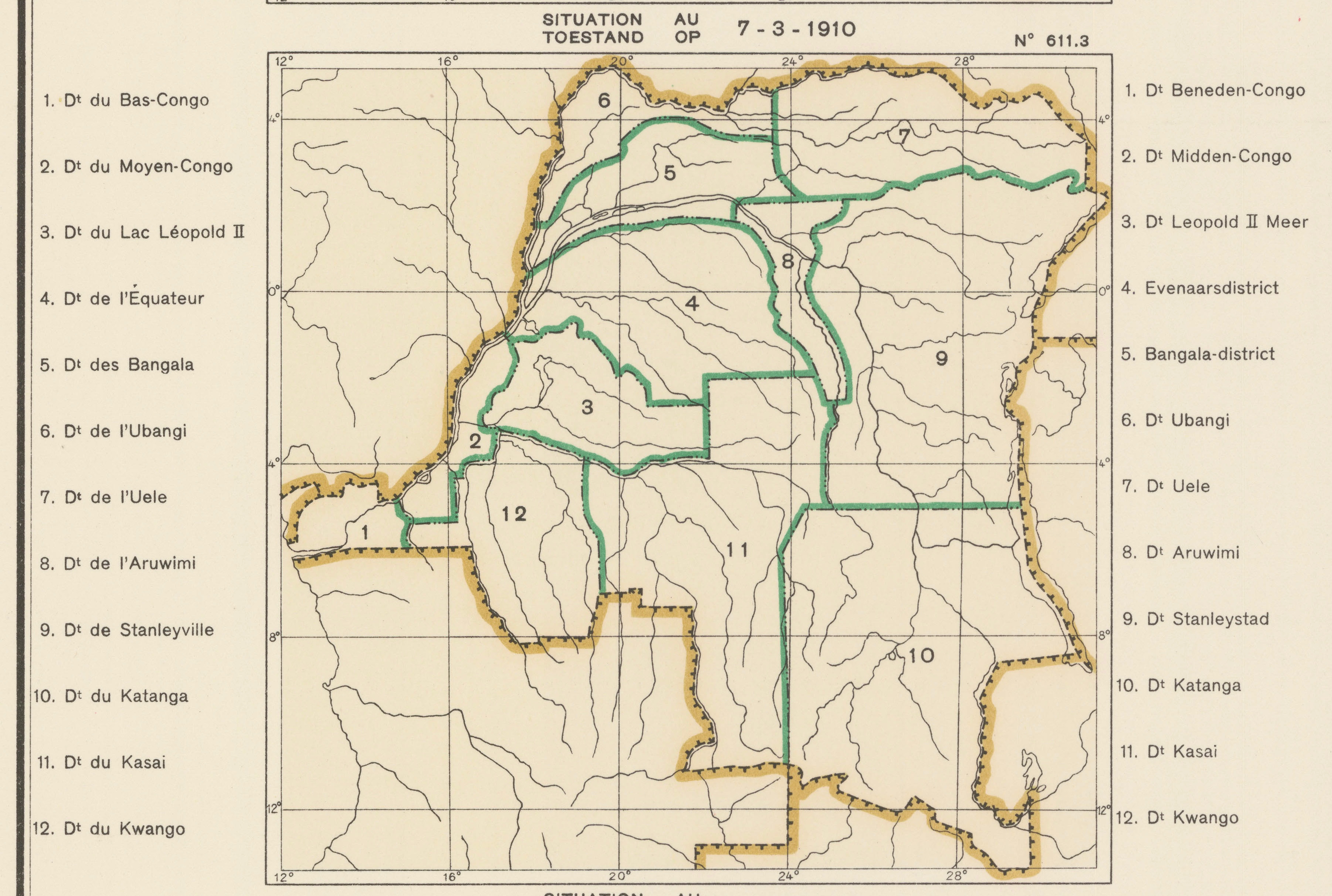
Districts in 1910

== 1910 districts ==
In 1910 there were 12 districts. Clockwise, starting from the mouth of the Congo River, they were:

- Bas-Congo
- Moyen-Congo
- Lac Léopold II
- Équateur
- Bangala
- Ubangi
- Uele
- Aruwimi
- Stanleyville
- Katanga
- Kasai
- Kwango

== 1912 districts ==
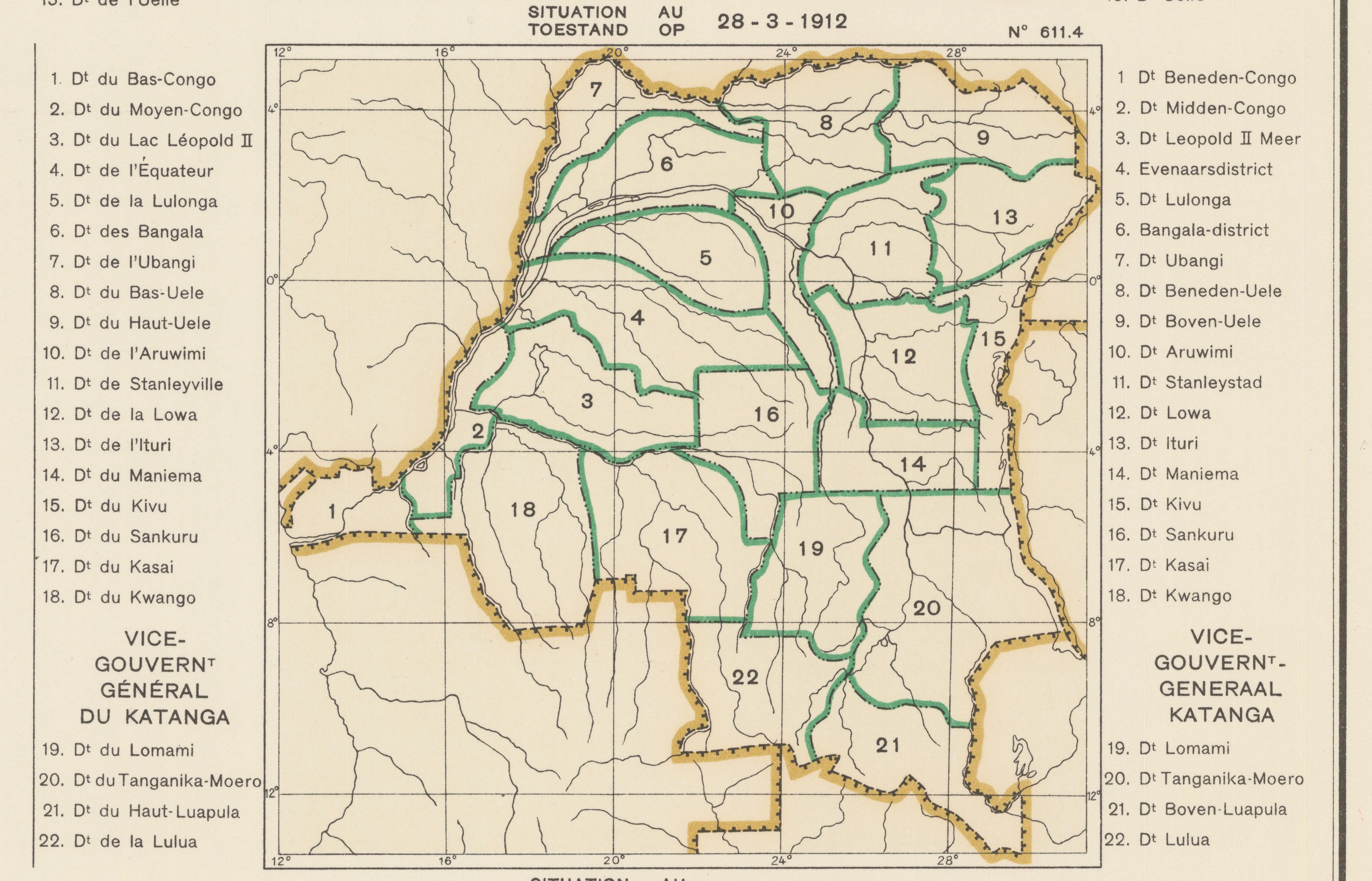
Districts in 1912

In 1912 there were 22 districts. Changes were:

- Équateur had been divided into a smaller Équateur to the south, and Lulonga to the north.
- Uele had been divided into Bas-Uele and Haut-Uele
- Stanleyville had been divided into a smaller Stanleyville, and Lowa, Ituri, Maniema and Kivu
- Kasai had been divided into Sankuru to the north and a smaller Kasai to the south. Part of the district had been reassigned to Katanga
- Katanga had been made into a vice governorship general, and divided into Lomami (including part of the old Kasai), Tanganika-Moero, Haut-Luapula and Lulua (including part of the old Kasai)

The districts in 1912 were:

- Bas-Congo
- Moyen-Congo
- Lac Léopold II
- Équateur
- Lulonga
- Bangala
- Ubangi
- Bas-Uele
- Haut-Uele
- Aruwimi
- Stanleyville
- Lowa
- Ituri
- Maniema
- Kivu
- Sankuru
- Kasai
- Kwango
- Lomami
- Tanganika-Moero
- Haut-Luapula
- Lulua

== Districts in 1926 ==
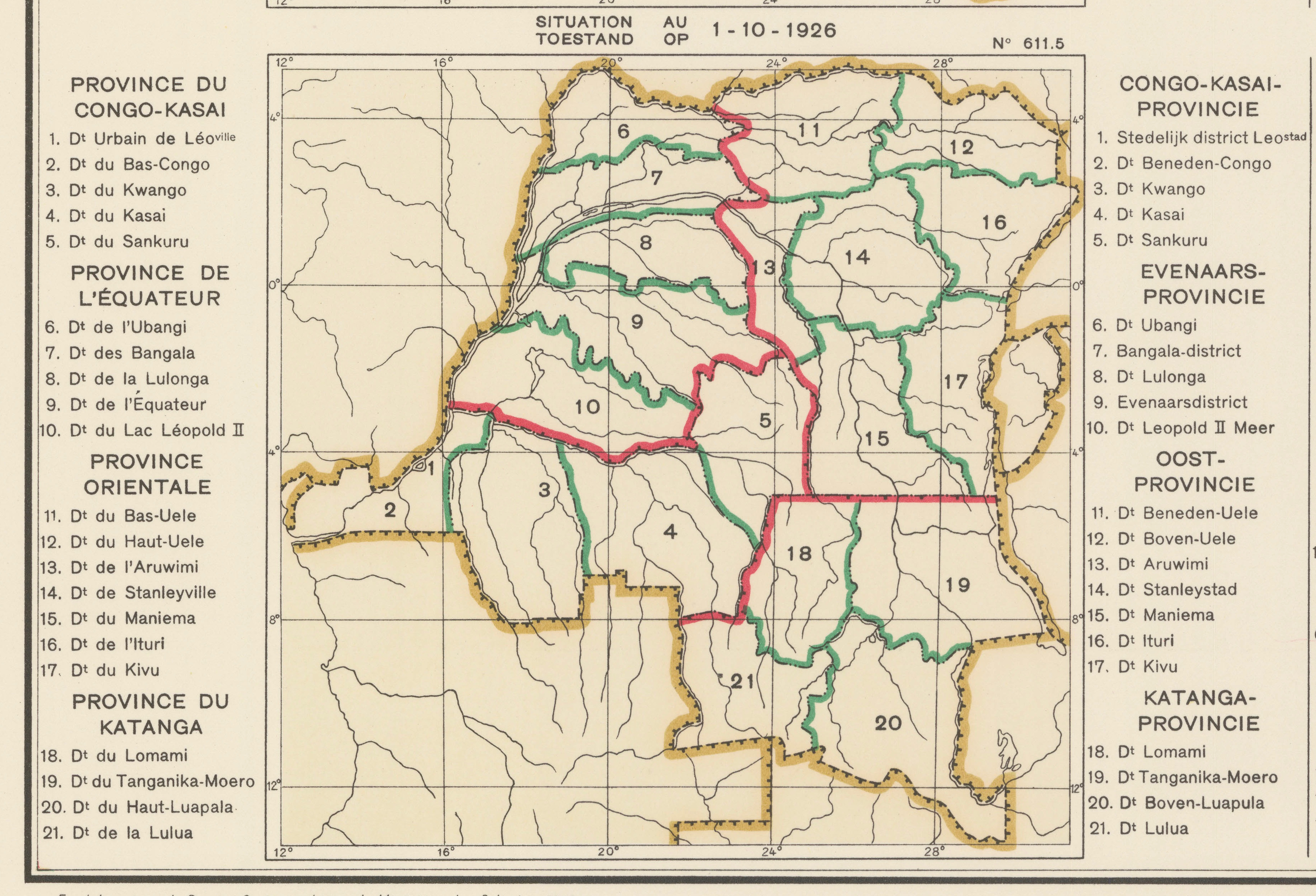
1926 provinces and districts

By 1926 the districts had been organized into four large provinces, with some boundary changes. Apart from boundary adjustments, the district-level changes were:

- A new urban district of Léopoldville had been created around the capital city
- Moyen-Congo had been merged into Bas-Congo (south) and Lac Léopold II (north)
- Lowa and Maniema had been combined into a new Maniema, losing part of their territory to Kivu to the east.

The new organization was¨:

- Congo-Kasaï
  - Léopoldville
  - Bas-Congo
  - Kwango
  - Kasai
  - Sankuru
- Équateur
  - Ubangi
  - Bangala
  - Lulonga
  - Équateur
  - Lac Léopold II
- Orientale
  - Bas-Uele
  - Haut-Uele
  - Aruwimi
  - Stanleyville
  - Maniema
  - Ituri
  - Kivu
- Katanga
  - Lomami
  - Tanganika-Moero
  - Haut-Luapula
  - Lulua

== Districts in 1933 ==
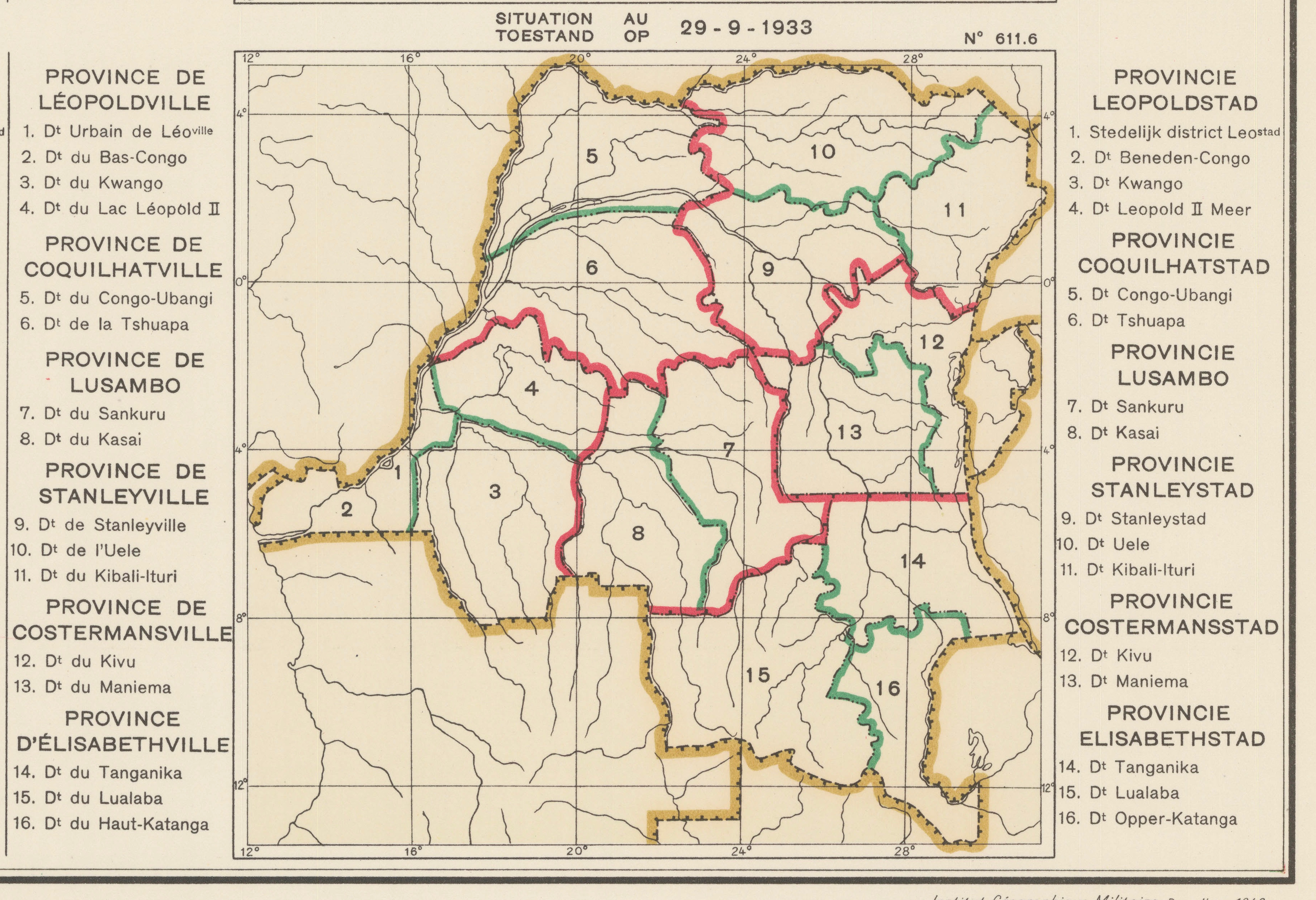
1933 provinces and districts

In 1933 the number of provinces was increased to six, while the number of districts was reduced to 16. This provincial breakdown would last until after the Republic of the Congo (Léopoldville) became independent in 1960. The new organization was:

- Léopoldville
  - Léopoldville
  - Bas-Congo
  - Kwango
  - Lac Léopold II
- Lusambo (Kasai)
  - Sankuru
  - Kasai
- Coquilhatville (Équateur)
  - Congo-Ubangi
  - Tshuapa
- Stanleyville (Orientale)
  - Stanleyville
  - Uele
  - Kibali-Ituri
- Costermansville (Kivu)
  - Kivu
  - Maniema
- Elisabethville (Katanga)
  - Tanganika
  - Lualaba
  - Haut-Katanga

== Districts in 1954 ==
The districts in 1954 were:

- Léopoldville
  - Léopoldville
  - Lac Leopold II
  - Kwilu
  - Kwango
  - Bas-Congo
  - Cataractes
- Kasai
  - Lulua
  - Sankuru
  - Kabinda
  - Kasai
- Equateur
  - Equateur
  - Mongala
  - Ubangi
  - Tshuapa
- Orientale
  - Stanleyville
  - Ituri
  - Bas-Uele
  - Haut-Uele
- Kivu
  - Sud-Kivu
  - Nord-Kivu
  - Maniema
- Katanga
  - Elisabethville
  - Tanganyika
  - Lualaba
  - Haut-Lomami
  - Luapula-Moero

== Post-independence ==
Further changes were made after the Republic of the Congo (Léopoldville) became independent. As of 2008 the provinces and districts were:

- Bandundu
  - Kwango
  - Kwilu
  - Mai-Ndombe
  - Plateaux
- Bas-Congo
  - Bas-Fleuve
  - Cataractes
  - Lukaya
- Kasai-Occidental
  - Kasaï
  - Lulua
- Kasai-Oriental
  - Kabinda
  - Sankuru
  - Tshilenge
- Équateur
  - Équateur
  - Mongala
  - Nord-Ubangi
  - Sud-Ubangi
  - Tshuapa
- Orientale
  - Bas-Uele
  - Haut-Uele
  - Ituri
  - Tshopo
- Nord-Kivu
- Sud-Kivu
- Maniema
- Katanga
  - Haut-Katanga
  - Haut-Lomami
  - Kolwezi
  - Lualaba
  - Tanganyika

== See also ==
- Districts of the Congo Free State
- Districts of the Democratic Republic of the Congo
- Provinces of the Democratic Republic of the Congo

== Sources ==
- Atlas général du Congo / Algemene atlas van Congo (in French and Dutch), Belgium: Institut Royal Colonial Belge, 1948–1963, OCLC 681334449
- Blaes, X. (October 2008). "Découpage administratif de la République Démocratique du Congo" (PDF) (in French). UNOCHA and PNUD. Archived from the original (PDF) on 2010-04-01.
- Brass, William (8 December 2015), Demography of Tropical Africa, Princeton University Press, ISBN 978-1-4008-7714-0
- Bruneau, Jean-Claude (30 June 2009), "Les nouvelles provinces de la République Démocratique du Congo : construction territoriale et ethnicités", L'Espace Politique, 7 (2009–1), doi:10.4000/espacepolitique.1296
- Lemarchand, René (1964), Political Awakening in the Belgian Congo, University of California Press, GGKEY:TQ2J84FWCXN
- Omasombo Tshonda, Jean (2015), Mongala : Jonction des territoires et bastion d'une identité supra-ethnique (PDF), Musée royal de l’Afrique centrale, ISBN 978-9-4922-4416-1
