= Bas-Congo District =

- District
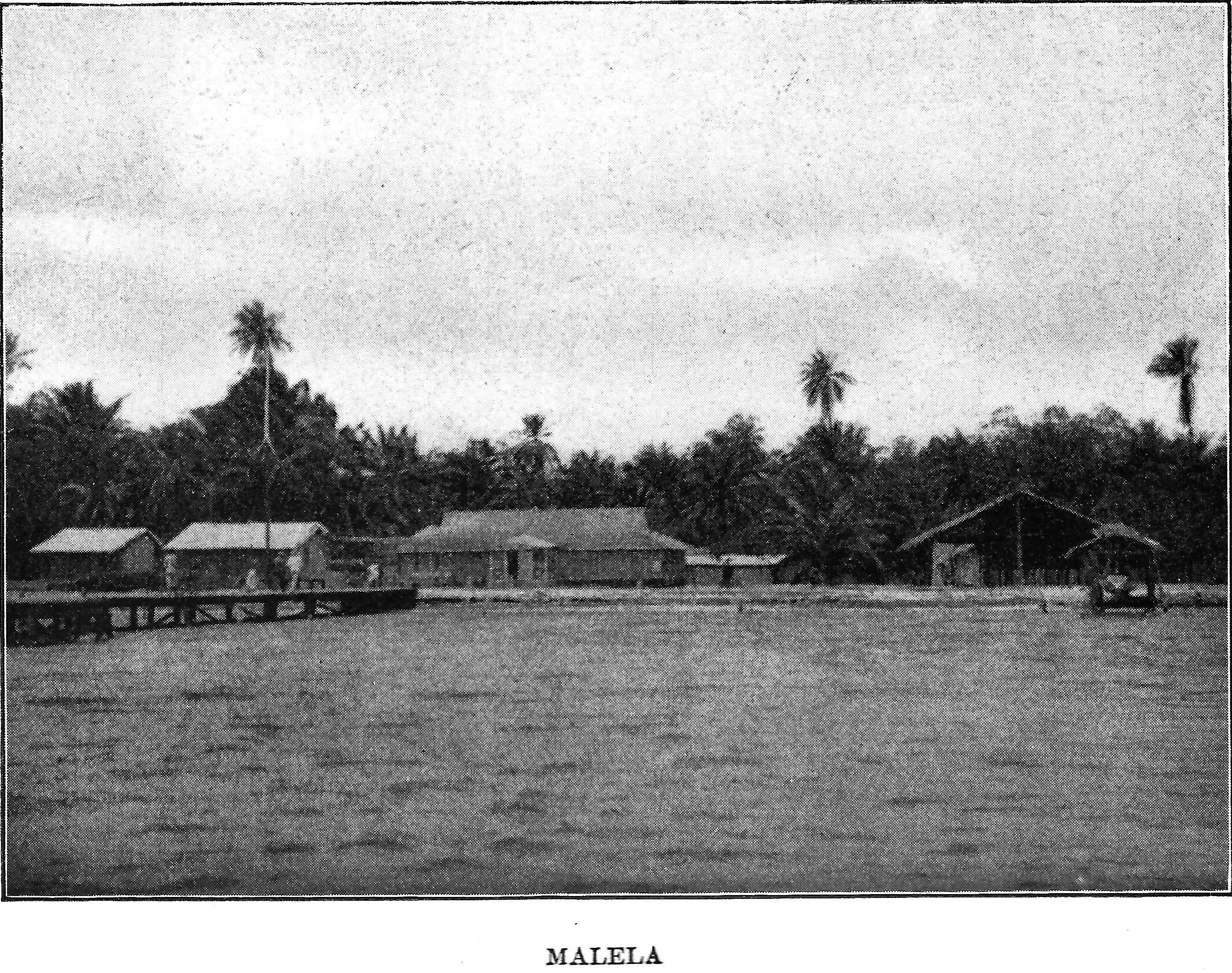
- Malela waterfront on the Atlantic coast c. 1910

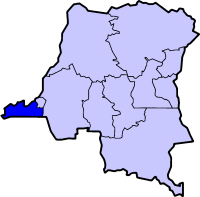
- Coordinates: 5.816667°S 13.483333°E
- Country: Democratic Republic of the Congo
- District: Bas-Congo

Bas-Congo (French: District du Bas-Congo, Dutch: District Beneden-Congo) was a district of the Belgian Congo and the Democratic Republic of the Congo. It went through various significant changes in extent. It roughly corresponds to the present province of Kongo Central.

== Location ==
A map of the Congo Free State in 1897 shows four small districts along the lower reaches of the Congo River. From the sea they were Banana District, Boma District, Matadi District and Cataractes District. Above them Stanley Pool District extended north along the east shore of the Congo River. The Free State was annexed by Belgium in 1908 as the Belgian Congo. In 1910 the districts of Banana, Boma, Matadi and Cataracts were consolidated into the Bas-Congo District.

Bas-Congo contained the port of Boma, the main port of entry to the Belgian Congo. The district was bounded to the south by Portuguese possessions, now Angola, and to the north by a Portuguese enclave of Cabinda and then by the French Congo, now the Republic of the Congo.

Bas-Congo District is shown on maps of 1910, 1912 and 1926 with somewhat different boundaries on each map. In the 1910 and 1912 maps it is bounded by the Moyen-Congo District to the northeast and the Kwango District to the east. Congo-Kasaï formally became a vice-government in 1919. It contained the districts of Bas-Congo, Léopoldville, Kwango, Kasai and Sankuru. A 1926 map shows that Bas-Congo had been extended to the north, absorbing the lower part of Moyen-Congo District, and now bordered Lac Léopold II District to the north.

With the 1933 reorganization Bas-Congo had been extended again to include a section of Lac Léopold II District along the Congo. Bas-Congo, Léopoldville, Kwango and Lac Léopold II were now included in the Léopoldville Province. A 1955-1957 map shows that Bas-Congo had been reduced to a small region at the mouth of the Congo, with Cataractes District now extending east and northeast, surrounding the urban district of Léopoldville. The area was now just 14,400 square kilometres (5,600 sq mi) out of a total of 357,700 square kilometres (138,100 sq mi) for Léopoldville province as a whole.

== Post-independence ==
On 14 August 1962 the province of Congo Central was formed from part of Léopoldville Province. It was renamed Bas-Zaïre from 27 October 1971, Bas-Congo in 1997 and received its current name of Kongo Central in 2015.

== Maps ==
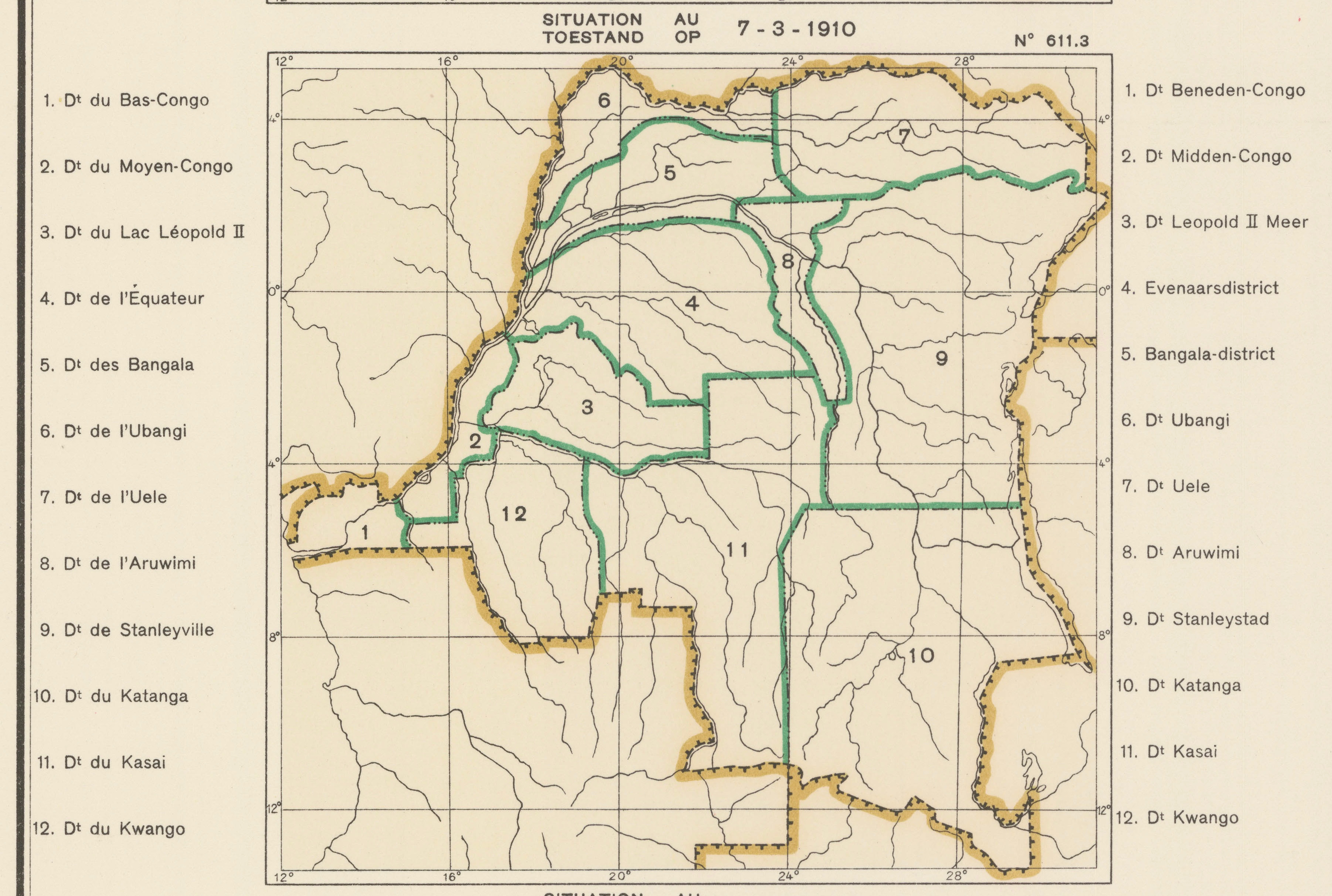
1910 districts

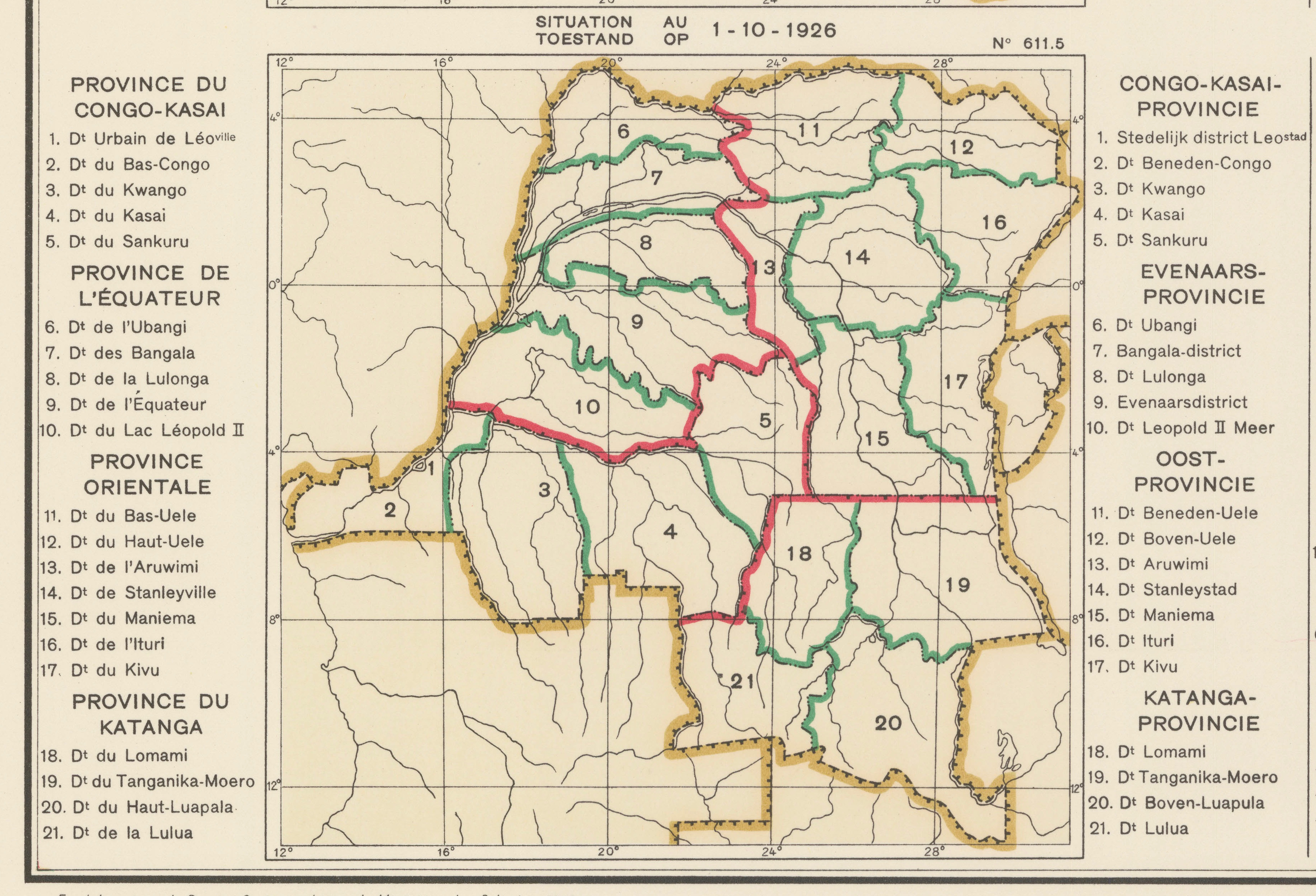
1926 provinces and districts

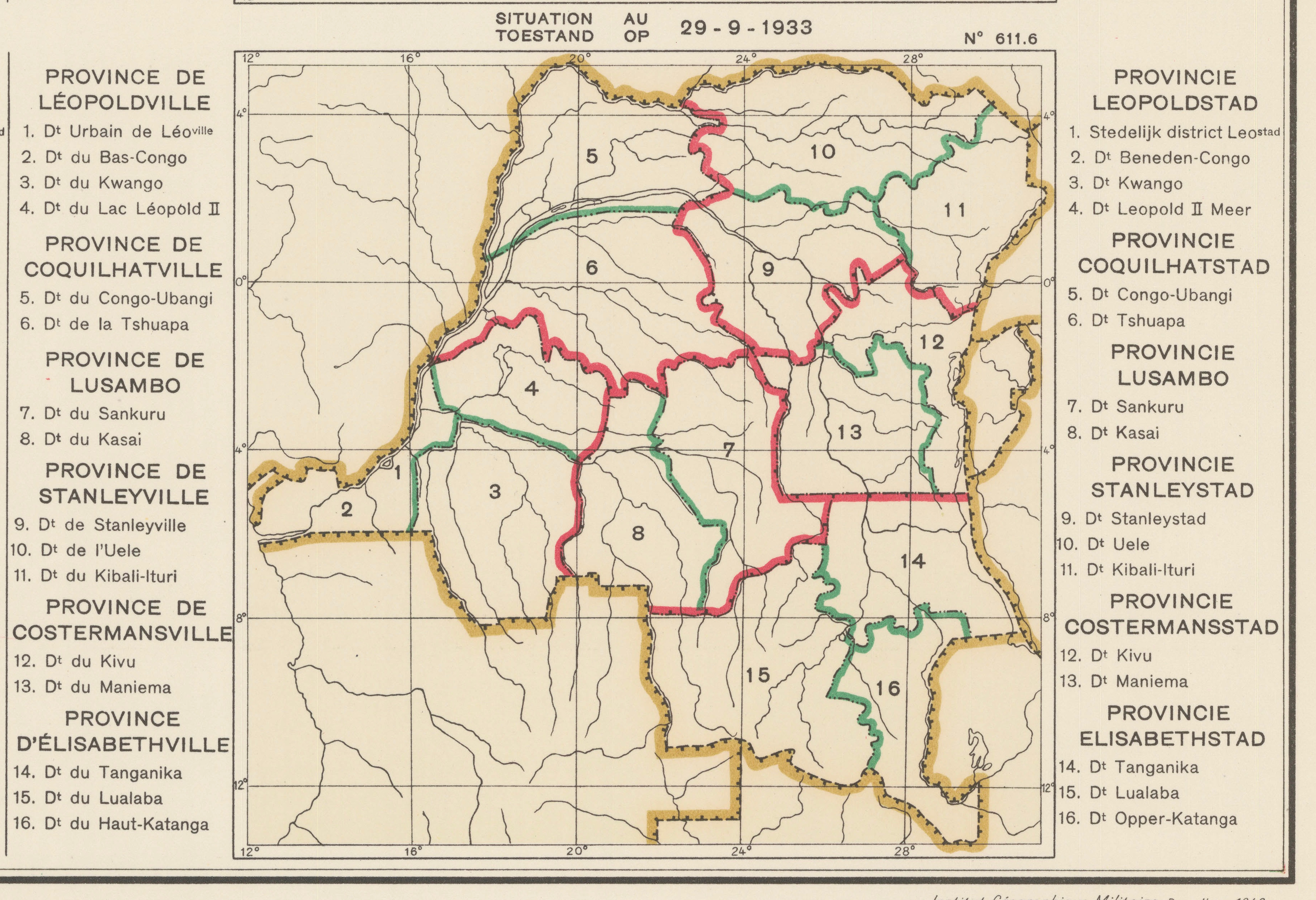
1933 provinces and districts

The present Kongo Central province

== See also ==
- Districts of the Belgian Congo
- Districts of the Democratic Republic of the Congo

== Sources ==
- Atlas général du Congo / Algemene atlas van Congo (in French and Dutch), Belgium: Institut Royal Colonial Belge, 1948–1963, OCLC 681334449
- Brass, William (8 December 2015), Demography of Tropical Africa, Princeton University Press, ISBN 978-1-4008-7714-0
- "Congo (Kinshasa) Provinces", Rulers.org
- Lemarchand, René (1964), Political Awakening in the Belgian Congo, University of California Press, GGKEY:TQ2J84FWCXN
- Omasombo Tshonda, Jean (2015), Mongala : Jonction des territoires et bastion d'une identité supra-ethnique (PDF), Musée royal de l’Afrique centrale, ISBN 978-9-4922-4416-1
