= List of protected areas in the Democratic Republic of the Congo =

The protected areas in the Democratic Republic of the Congo include national parks, biosphere reserves, wildlife reserves, nature reserves, scientific reserves, community reserves, and hunting reserves. These areas total 324,290 km^{2}, or 13.83% of the country's land area. Several of the country's protected areas have been internationally designated as World Heritage Sites or biosphere reserves by UNESCO, or as wetlands of international importance under the Ramsar Convention.

== National parks ==
(IUCN protected area category II)

- Garamba National Park (5000 km^{2})
- Kahuzi-Biega National Park (6689 km^{2})
- Kundelungu National Park (8236 km^{2})
- Lomami National Park (8879 km^{2})
- Maiko National Park (10886 km^{2})
- Mangroves Marine National Park (216 km^{2})
- Salonga National Park (17,140 km^{2})
- Upemba National Park (13674 km^{2})
- Virunga National Park (7769 km^{2})

== City parks ==
- Nsele Valley Park

== Biosphere reserves ==
- Yangambi Biosphere Reserve (2215 km^{2})
- Lufira Biosphere Reserve (687 km^{2})
- Luki Biosphere Reserve (311 km^{2})

== Wildlife reserves ==
- Bomu Wildlife Reserve (6542 km^{2})
- Okapi Wildlife Reserve (13,847 km^{2})

== Nature reserves ==
- Abumonbazi Nature Reserve (5726 km^{2})
- Itombwe Nature Reserve (6009 km^{2})
- Kisimba Ikobo Primate Nature Reserve (963 km^{2})
- Lake Tshangalele Nature Reserve (447 km^{2})
- Lomako-Yokokala Nature Reserve (3602 km^{2})
- Mangai Nature Reserve (1903 km^{2})
- Mangrove Nature Reserve (1000 km^{2})
- Ngiri Triangle Nature Reserve (5500 km^{2})
- N'Sele Nature Reserve (34 km^{2})
- Sankuru Nature Reserve
- Tayna Nature Reserve (893 km^{2})
- Tumba-Lediima Nature Reserve (7412 km^{2})

== Scientific reserves ==
- Luo Scientific Reserve (480 km^{2})

== Community reserves ==
- Lyondji Bonobo Community Reserve (1030 km^{2})
- Kokolopori Bonobo Nature Reserve (4875 sq. kilometer

== Hunting reserves ==
- Bili-Uere Hunting Reserve (32,748 km^{2})
- Bombo Lumene Hunting Reserve (2168 km^{2})
- Bomu Hunting Reserve (4126 km^{2})
- Bushimaie Hunting Reserve (4369 km^{2})
- Gangala-na-Bodio Hunting Reserve (9829 km^{2})
- Luama-Katanga Hunting Reserve (2308 km^{2})
- Luama-Kivu Hunting Reserve (3900 km^{2})
- Lubudi-Sampwe Hunting Reserve (3489 km^{2})
- Maika-Penge Hunting Reserve (1499 km^{2})
- Rubi-Tele Hunting Reserve (6191 km^{2})
- Rutshuru Hunting Reserve (661 km^{2})
- Swa-Kibula Hunting Reserve (1004 km^{2})

== International designations ==
=== UNESCO biosphere reserves ===
- Lufira Valley Biosphere Reserve (147 km^{2})
- Luki Forest Reserve (330 km^{2})
- Yangambi Biosphere Reserve (2350 km^{2})

=== Ramsar sites, wetlands of international importance ===
- Lufira Basin (44,710 km^{2})
- Mangroves National Park (660 km^{2})
- Ngiri-Tumba-Maindombe (65,696 km^{2})
- Virunga National Park (8000 km^{2})

=== World Heritage Sites ===
- Okapi Wildlife Reserve (13726 km^{2})
- Salonga National Park (36,000 km^{2})
- Virunga National Park (7900 km^{2})
- Garamba National Park (4920 km^{2})
- Kahuzi-Biega National Park (6000 km^{2})
