= List of ecoregions in the Democratic Republic of the Congo =

The following is a list of ecoregions in the Democratic Republic of the Congo, as identified by the World Wide Fund for Nature (WWF).

== Terrestrial ecoregions ==
by major habitat type

=== Tropical and subtropical moist broadleaf forests ===
- Albertine Rift montane forests
- Atlantic Equatorial coastal forests
- Central Congolian lowland forests
- Eastern Congolian swamp forests
- Northeastern Congolian lowland forests
- Northwestern Congolian lowland forests
- Western Congolian swamp forests

=== Tropical and subtropical grasslands, savannas, and shrublands ===
- Angolan miombo woodlands
- Central Zambezian miombo woodlands
- East Sudanian savanna
- Itigi–Sumbu thicket
- Northern Congolian forest–savanna mosaic
- Southern Congolian forest–savanna mosaic
- Victoria Basin forest–savanna mosaic
- Western Congolian forest–savanna mosaic

=== Montane grasslands and shrublands ===
- Ruwenzori-Virunga montane moorlands

=== Flooded grasslands and savannas ===
- Zambezian flooded grasslands

=== Mangroves ===
- Central African mangroves

== Freshwater ecoregions ==
by bioregion

=== West Coastal Equatorial ===
- Southern West Coastal Equatorial

=== Congo ===
- Albertine Highlands
- Bangweulu-Mweru
- Central Congo
- Cuvette Centrale
- Kasai
- Lower Congo
- Lower Congo Rapids
- Mai-Ndombe
- Malebo Pool
- Sudanic Congo (Oubangi)
- Thysville Caves
- Tumba
- Uele
- Upemba
- Upper Congo
- Upper Congo Rapids

=== Nilo-Sudan ===
- Upper Nile

=== Great Lakes ===
- Lake Tanganyika
- Lakes Kivu, Edward, George, and Victoria

== Marine ecoregions ==
- Gulf of Guinea South
