= Northeastern Congolian lowland forests =

Ecoregion in the Democratic Republic of the Congo and the Central African Republic

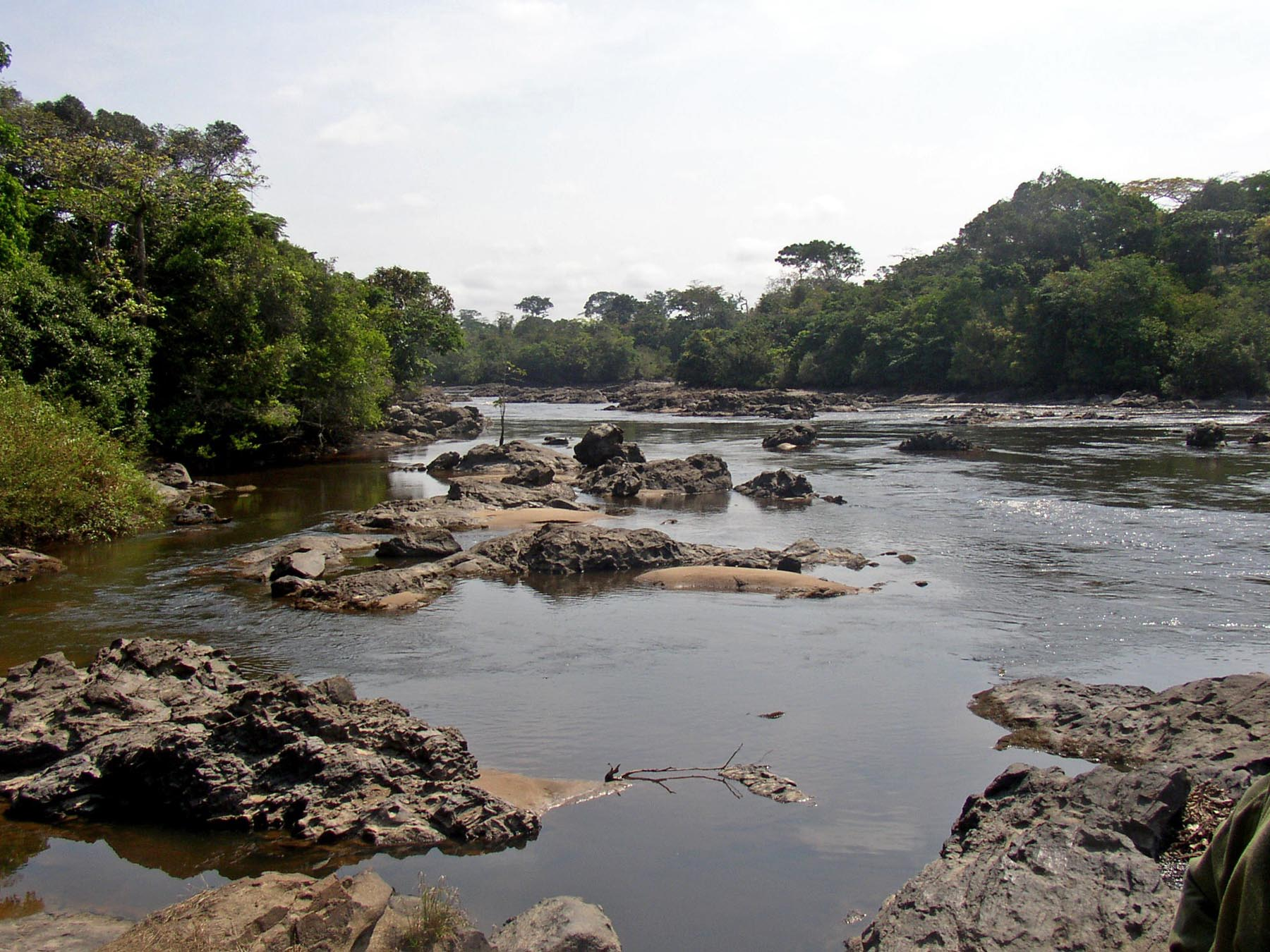
- Okapi Wildlife Reserve

- Northeastern Congolian lowland forests

Ecology
- Realm: Afrotropical
- Biome: Tropical and subtropical moist broadleaf forests
- Borders: List: Albertine Rift montane forests; Eastern Congolian swamp forests; Northern Congolian forest–savanna mosaic; Northwestern Congolian lowland forests; Southern Congolian forest–savanna mosaic; Western Congolian swamp forests

Geography
- Area: 512,304 km^{2} (197,802 sq mi)
- Countries: Democratic Republic of Congo; Central African Republic
- Elevation: 600 m to 1,000 m
- Coordinates: 2.2°N 25.7°E
- Rivers: Bounded by Uele River, Congo River, Elila River, and Bomu River

Conservation
- Conservation status: vulnerable
- Global 200: yes
- Protected: 54,712 km^{2} (11%)

The Northeastern Congolian lowland forests (French: Forêts de plaine du nord-est du Congo) is a tropical moist broadleaf forest ecoregion that spans the Democratic Republic of the Congo and the Central African Republic.

== Geography ==
The Northeastern Congolian lowland forests lie in the northeastern basin of the Congo River. The ecoregion is mostly in the Democratic Republic of the Congo, with a portion extending into the southern Central African Republic. It is the easternmost portion of the Guineo-Congolian region, a belt of tropical rain forests that extends through western and central Africa.

The Ituri Rainforest is in the ecoregion.

The ecoregion lies north and east of Congo River, and other rainforest ecoregions bound it on the west and southwest. It is bounded on the north by the Northern Congolian forest–savanna mosaic, and on the southwest by the Southern Congolian forest–savanna mosaic across the Congo River. The Albertine Rift mountains bound the Congo Basin on the east, and are home to the neighboring Albertine Rift montane forests ecoregion above 1500 meters elevation.

== Climate ==
The climate is humid and tropical. Average annual rainfall ranges from 1,500 mm to 2,000 mm, and is generally lower in the east. There is a distinct dry season from January to March.

== Flora ==
The predominant plant community is lowland moist forest. The forests are principally evergreen, with areas of semi-evergreen forest where some trees lose their leaves during the winter dry season. The forests are mostly a mix of species, although there are some single-species stands, notably Gilbertiodendron dewevrei.

Transitional submontane forest is found at the eastern edge of the ecoregion on the lower slopes of the Albertine Rift mountains, and drier transitional forest is found along the ecoregion's northern edge.

== Fauna ==
Sixteen mammals are endemic to the ecoregion, including the okapi (Okapia johnstoni), giant genet (Genetta victoriae), aquatic genet (Genetta piscivora), lesser forest shrew (Sylvisorex oriundus), African foggy shrew (Crocidura caliginea), fuscous shrew (Crocidura polia), owl-faced monkey (Cercopithecus hamlyni), and L'Hoest's monkey (Allochrocebus lhoesti). It is important habitat for the eastern lowland gorilla (Gorilla beringei graueri). Limited-range mammals include the pied bat (Glauconycteris superba) Allen's striped bat (Glauconycteris alboguttata), Misonne's soft-furred mouse (Praomys misonnei), and Verschuren's swamp rat (Congomys verschureni).

Endemic birds include Neumann's coucal (Centropus neumanni) and golden-naped weaver (Ploceus aureonucha). Nahan's francolin (Ptilopachus nahani), Ituri batis (Batis ituriensis), Turner's eremomela (Eremomela turneri), Congo peacock (Afropavo congensis), Sassi's greenbul (Phyllastrephus lorenzi), Bedford's paradise-flycatcher (Terpsiphone bedfordi), and Chapin's mountain-babbler (Turdoides chapini) are considered near-endemic.

There are seven endemic amphibians, including the olive shovelnose (Hemisus olivaceus), Kigulube reed frog (Hyperolius diaphanus), Kunungu reed frog (H. schoutendeni), Mertens' running frog (Kassina mertensi), Buta River frog (Phrynobatrachus gastoni), Christy's grassland frog (Ptychadena christyi), and Pangi Territory frog (Amietia chapini). There are five endemic reptiles, including the Zaire dwarf gecko.

== People ==
The eastern edge of the ecoregion along the Albertine Rift is the most densely populated. The central part of the ecoregion, including the Ituri Forest, is sparsely populated, and is home to the Mbuti people, an indigenous pygmy people who live by hunting and gathering in the forest.

== Protected areas ==
A 2017 assessment found that 54,712 km^{2}, or 11%, of the ecoregion is in protected areas. 34% of the unprotected area is still forested. Protected areas include:

- Abumonbazi Nature Reserve
- Bangassou Forest Reserve
- Bili-Uere Hunting Reserve
- Bomu Wildlife Reserve
- Gangala-na-Bodio Hunting Reserve
- Kahuzi-Biega National Park
- Kisimba Ikobo Primate Nature Reserve
- Maika-Penge Hunting Reserve
- Maïko National Park
- Okapi Wildlife Reserve
- Rubi-Tele Hunting Reserve
- Tayna Nature Reserve
- Virunga National Park
- Yangambi Biosphere Reserve
