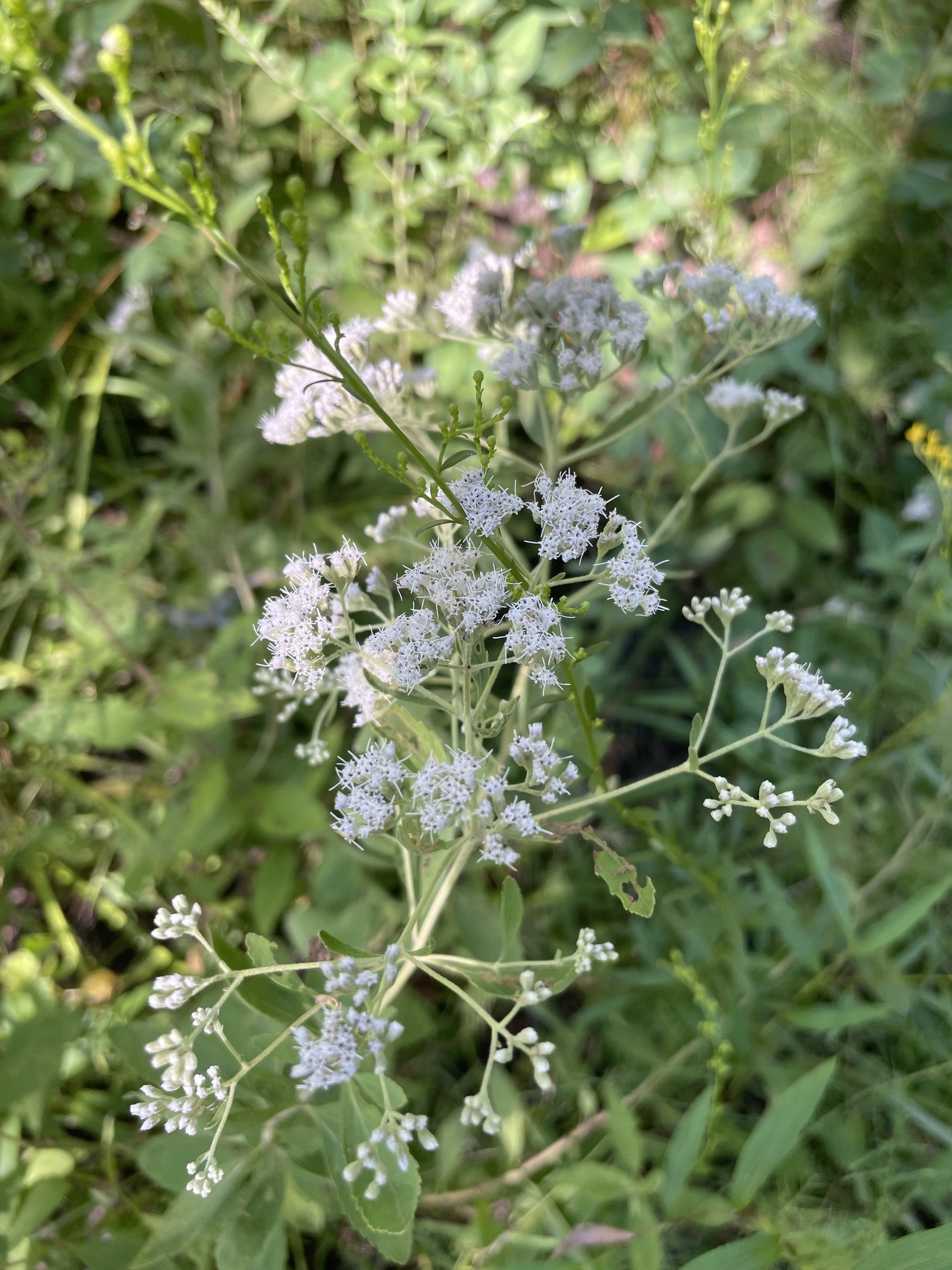

Conservation status
- Secure (NatureServe)

Scientific classification
- Kingdom: Plantae
- Clade: Tracheophytes
- Clade: Angiosperms
- Clade: Eudicots
- Clade: Asterids
- Order: Asterales
- Family: Asteraceae
- Genus: Eupatorium
- Species: E. semiserratum

Binomial name
- Eupatorium semiserratum DC.

Synonyms
- Eupatorium cuneifolium var. semiserratum (DC.) Fernald & Griscom; Uncasia semiserrata (DC.) Greene; Eupatorium parviflorum Elliott 1823 not Aubl. 1775

= Eupatorium semiserratum =

Species of flowering plant

Eupatorium semiserratum, commonly called smallflower thoroughwort, is a North American plant species in the family Asteraceae. It is native to the southeastern and south-central United States, found in all the coastal states from Maryland to Texas and inland as far as Missouri and Kentucky.

Eupatorium semiserratum stems sometimes more than 100 cm (40 inches) tall and are produced from short rhizomes. The inflorescences, which can be present from late July-October, are composed of a large number of small white flower heads with 5 disc florets but no ray florets. This species is similar to Eupatorium linearifolium but has smaller heads of flowers and stems which branch near the tips rather than near the base. The plants previously known as Eupatorium glaucescens or Eupatorium cuneifolium are now classified as E. semiserratum or E. linearifolium.

Another related species is Eupatorium lancifolium, which is found in Alabama, Arkansas, Louisiana, and Texas, and which has sometimes been classified as part of E. semiserratum.

== Distribution and habitat ==
Eupatorium semiserratum is found the southeastern United States, from southeast Virginia south to northern Florida, west to Texas and Arkansas, with a disjunct population found in Tennessee.

Generally, it can be found in wetlands such as swamp forests, seepage bogs, clay-based Carolina bays. It is also found in savannas.

== Uses ==
E. semiserratum has anticancer properties against various human cancer cell lines.
