= Northern Congolian forest–savanna mosaic =

Forest and savanna ecoregion of Central Africa

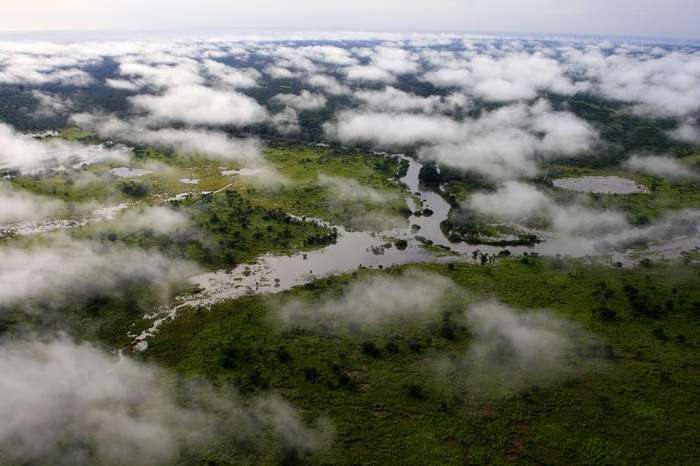
- Garamba National Park, Democratic Republic of the Congo

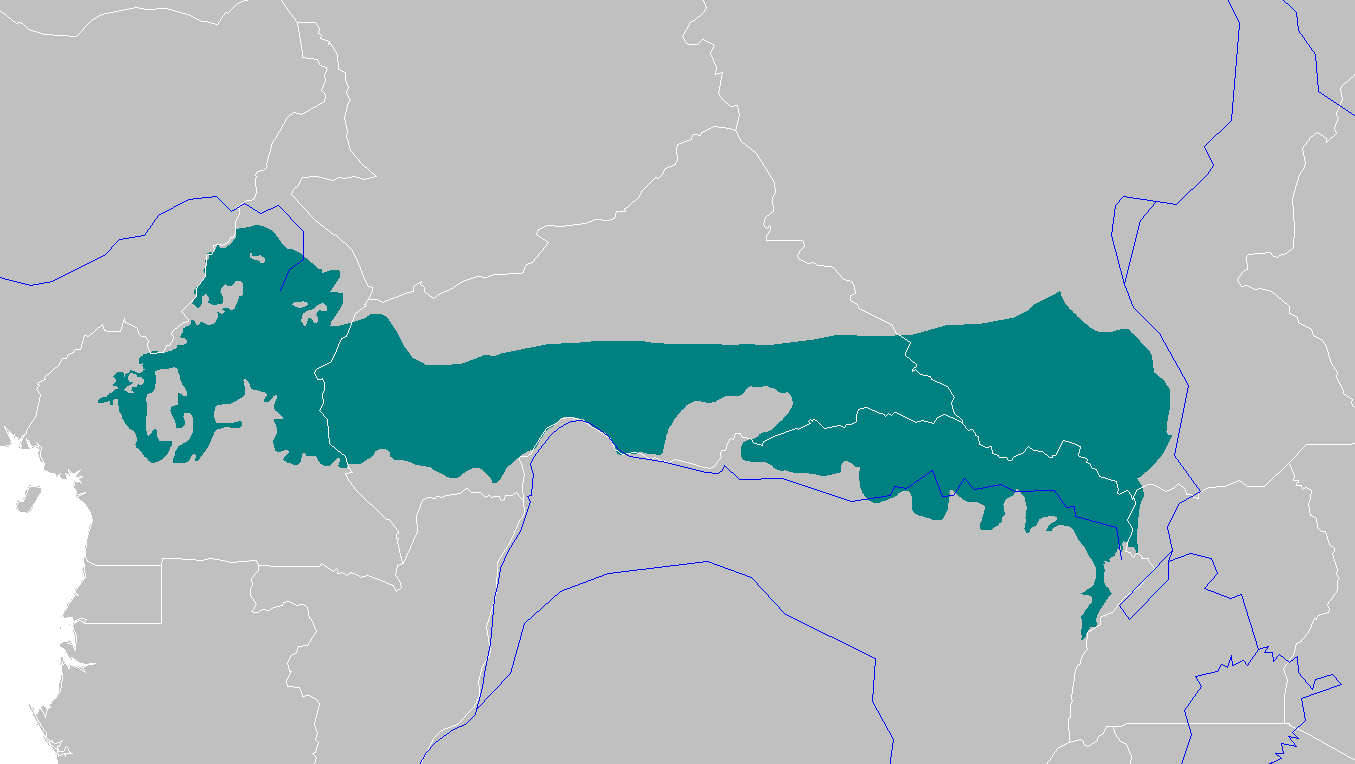
- Map of the Northern Congolian forest–savanna mosaic ecoregion

Ecology
- Realm: Afrotropical
- Biome: tropical and subtropical moist broadleaf forests
- Borders: List: Albertine Rift montane forests; Cameroon Highlands forests; Cross–Sanaga–Bioko coastal forests; East Sudanian savanna; Guinean forest–savanna mosaic; Northeastern Congolian lowland forests; Northwestern Congolian lowland forests

Geography
- Area: 703,010 km^{2} (271,430 sq mi)
- Countries: Cameroon; Central African Republic; Democratic Republic of the Congo; South Sudan

Conservation
- Conservation status: Critical/endangered
- Protected: 104,288 km^{2} (15%)

The Northern Congolian forest–savanna mosaic is a forest and savanna ecoregion of central Africa. It extends east and west across central Africa, covering parts of Cameroon, Central African Republic, Democratic Republic of the Congo, South Sudan, and Uganda. It is part of the belt of transitional forest-savanna mosaic that lie between Africa's moist equatorial Guineo-Congolian forests and the tropical dry forests, savannas, and grasslands to the north and south.

== Geography ==
The Northern Congolian forest–savanna mosaic lies between the equatorial Congolian forests to the south and the drier East Sudanian savanna to the north. It extends from the Cameroon Highlands in the west, across central Cameroon and the southern Central African Republic to southwestern South Sudan and northeastern Democratic Republic of the Congo, where it is bounded on the east by flooded grasslands of the Sudd, the eastern block of the East Sudanian savanna, and the Albertine Rift montane forests.

The ecoregion lies on a dissected plateau composed of ancient precambrian rocks. Elevations range from 500 to 700 meters. Most of the plateau is drained by the northern tributaries of the Congo River, except the easternmost portion which is drained by the Nile River.

== Climate ==
The ecoregion has a tropical savanna climate. Average annual rainfall ranges from 1200 to 1600 mm. Rainfall is generally higher in the south, in the transition to the Congolian forests, and lower in the north at the edge of the Sudanian savanna. There is a summer rainy season and winter dry season. Temperatures range from 34 °C in the summer wet season to 13 °C in the cooler winter dry season.

== Flora ==
The ecoregion is a mosaic of forest, open woodland, and grassland.

Gallery forests occur along year-round rivers and in areas with year-round groundwater. Typical gallery forest trees include Berlinia grandiflora, Cola laurifolia, Cynometra vogelii, Diospyros elliotii, Parinari congensis, and Pterocarpus santalinoides. Remnants of semi-evergreen forest are found in the south, composed mostly of typical Congolian species like Afzelia africana, Aningeria altissima, Gambeya perpulchra, Cola gigantea, Morus mesozygia, and Khaya grandifoliola.

Wooded and open grasslands are widespread. The ground is thickly covered by perennial grasses, including species of Andropogon, Hyparrhenia, and Loudetia. Trees, including Annona senegalensis, Burkea africana, Combretum collinum, Hymenocardia acida, Parinari curatellifolia, Stereospermum kunthianum, and species of Vitex and Strychnos, form open-canopied woodlands or are scattered in grassy savannas. Frequent human-caused fires have allowed grasslands to spread into areas formerly covered with forest or woodland.

Isolated patches of dry forest are found in areas with sparse human population and few human-caused fires, particularly in the Central African Republic and central Cameroon. Isoberlinia doka is the dominant tree, with Afzelia africana, Burkea africana, Anogeissus leiocarpus, Borassus aethiopum, and species of Terminalia.

== Fauna ==
The ecoregion is home to various large mammals, including both forest- and grassland-adapted species. Grazing mammals include the African bush elephant (Loxodonta africana) and African forest elephant (Loxodonta cyclotis), Kordofan giraffe (Giraffa camelopardalis antiquorum), African buffalo (Syncerus caffer), eastern giant eland (Taurotragus derbianus gigas), lowland bongo (Tragelaphus eurycerus eurycerus), waterbuck (Kobus ellipsiprymnus), Buffon's kob (Kobus kob kob), roan antelope (Hippotragus equinus), and red-flanked duiker (Cephalophus rufilatus). Lions (Panthera leo) and leopards (Panthera pardus) are the top predators in the ecoregion. Hippopotamus (Hippopotamus amphibius) live in and near rivers and streams. Native primates include the patas monkey (Erythrocebus patas) and olive baboon (Papio anubis). The western black rhinoceros (Diceros bicornis longipes) once ranged across the ecoregion, but is now thought to be extinct. The northern white rhinoceros (Ceratotherium simum cottoni) once inhabited the eastern portion of the ecoregion, but is now extinct in the wild.

Near-endemic mammals include Pousargues's mongoose (Dologale dybowskii), which also inhabits the Victoria Basin forest–savanna mosaic to the east, and the ochre mole-rat (Fukomys ochraceocinereus).

Common birds include the red-headed lovebird (Agapornis pullarius) and little greenbul (Eurillas virens). The forest ground-thrush (Geokichla oberlaenderi) is a near-endemic species.

Endemic frogs include the Mauda River frog (Phrynobatrachus albomarginatus), Buta River frog (P. scapularis), eastern dwarf clawed frog (Hymenochirus boulengeri), and Ptychadena ingeri. The Sudan beaked snake (Letheobia sudanensis) and the lizard Ichnotropis chapini are endemic reptiles.

== Protected areas ==
A 2017 assessment found that 104,288 km^{2}, or 15%, of the ecoregion is in protected areas. Protected areas include Bénoué, Deng Deng, Faro, Mbam Djerem, Mbéré Valley, and Mpem and Djim national parks in Cameroon, Gashaka-Gumti National Park in Nigeria, Garamba National Park, Virunga National Park, Bili-Uere Hunting Reserve, and Gangala-na-Bodio Hunting Reserve in the Democratic Republic of Congo, Lantoto, Shambe, and Southern national parks in South Sudan, and Chinko Nature Reserve and Zemongo Faunal Reserve in the Central African Republic.
