= Southern Congolian forest–savanna mosaic =

Ecoregion in the Democratic Republic of the Congo and Angola

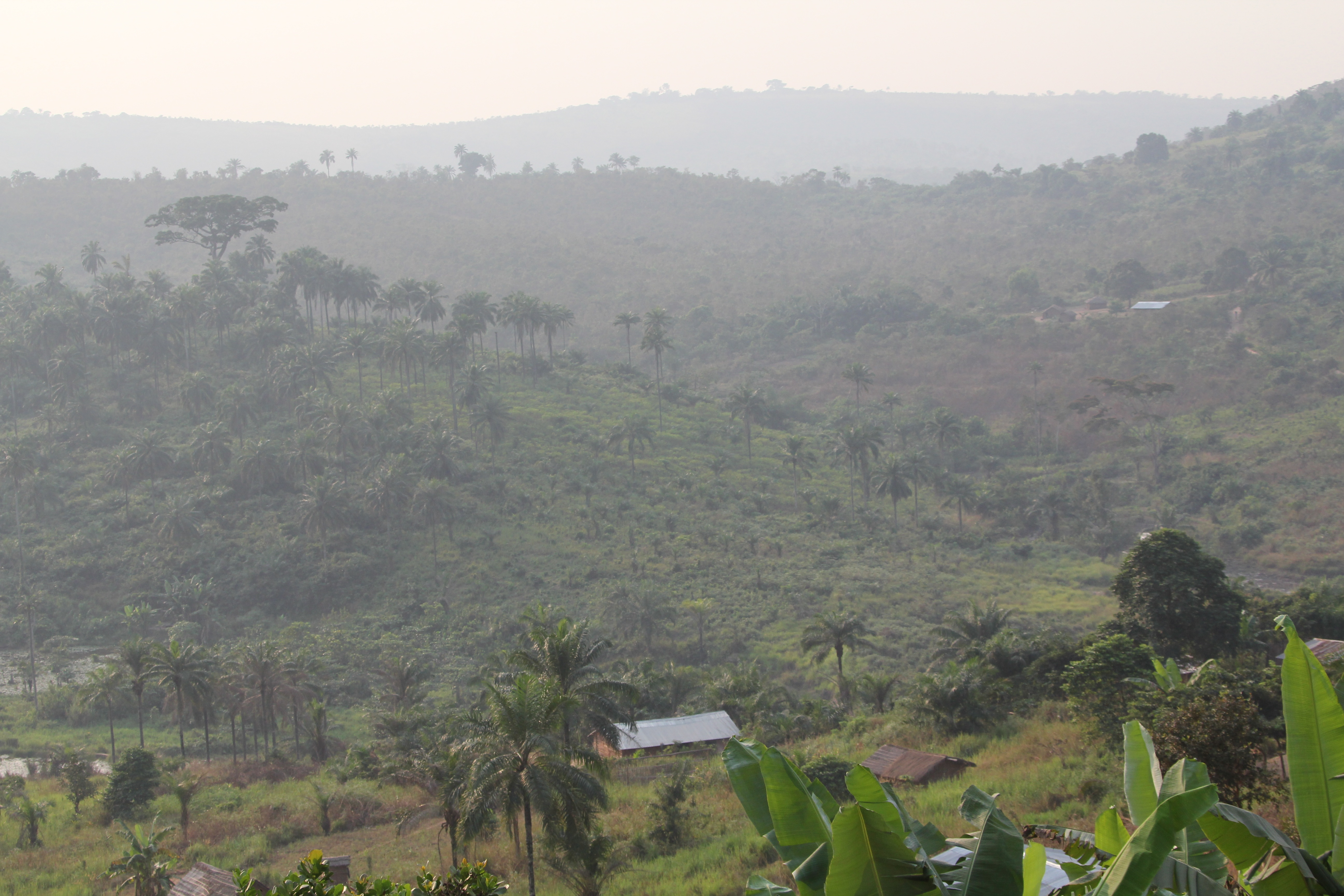
- Near Masi-Manimba, Democratic Republic of Congo

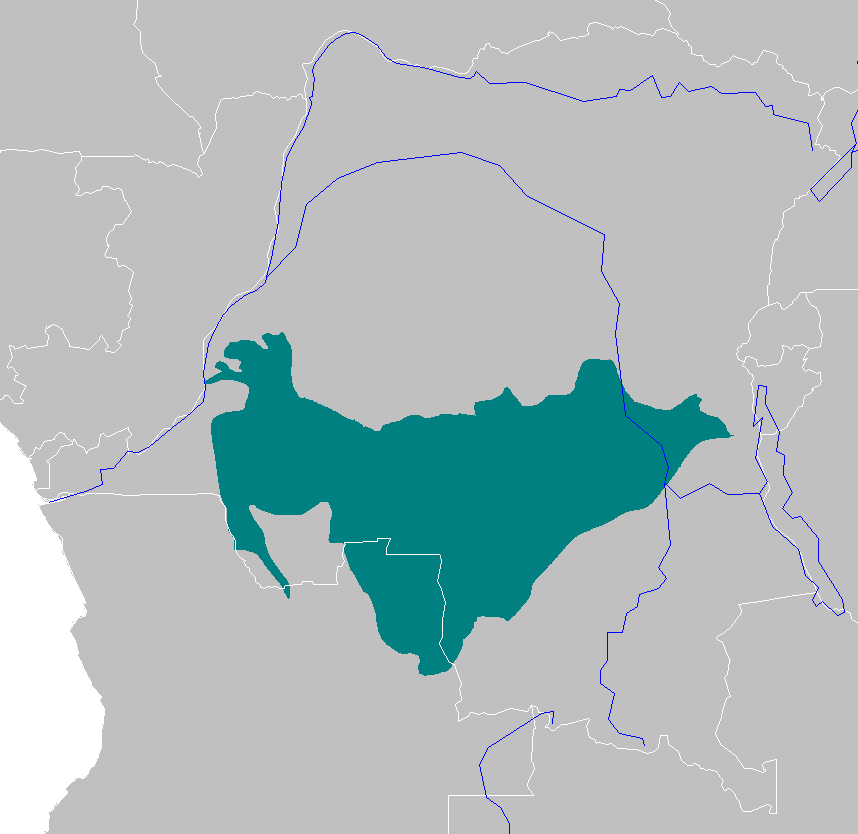
- geographic extent of the Southern Congolian forest–savanna mosaic

Ecology
- Realm: Afrotropical
- Biome: tropical and subtropical grasslands, savannas, and shrublands
- Borders: List: Albertine Rift montane forests; Angolan miombo woodlands; Central Congolian lowland forests; Central Zambezian miombo woodlands; Northeastern Congolian lowland forests; Western Congolian forest–savanna mosaic

Geography
- Area: 565,812 km^{2} (218,461 sq mi)
- Countries: Democratic Republic of Congo; Angola

Conservation
- Conservation status: Vulnerable
- Protected: 19,841 km^{2} (4%)

The southern Congolian forest–savanna mosaic is an ecoregion that covers a large area of the southern Democratic Republic of the Congo and northeastern Angola. Its rich blend of habitats provides key insights into the biogeography of central Africa with the extensive climatic variation that it has been experiencing for the last 10 million years. The human population is not high.

== Geography ==
The Southern Congolian forest–savanna mosaic is a transitional region between the equatorial Congolian forests region to the north and the woodlands and savannas of the Zambezian region to the south. The Central Congolian lowland forests lie to the north, west of the Congo River, and the Northeastern Congolian lowland forests are east of the Congo. In the highlands to the east are the Albertine Rift montane forests. The Central Zambezian miombo woodlands lie to the southeast, and the Angolan miombo woodlands to the southwest. To the west across the Kwango River is the Western Congolian forest–savanna mosaic.

Elevations range from 300 to 400 m in the southern Congo Basin to plateaus of 1000 meters or more.

Central Africa is familiar with repeated climatic variation that have caused rain forest and savanna expansion and deflation in consideration of the late Pleistocene tectonics defined the Congo Basin. Important climatic shifts have occurred more than 20 times in less than 10 million years. Plants and animals adapt, change, and go extinct with any climatic oscillation. Widespread and immensely resilient organisms that lived through in islands of habitat and accustomed to spatial fluidity were favored. During dry periods, savanna communities breached far into the Congo Basin. The relatively moist riparian forests become detached from one another and compose forest island localities in the savanna matrix.

== Climate ==
The climate is tropical. Mean maximum temperature ranges from 27º to 30 °C, and annual mean minimum temperature ranges from 18º to 21 °C. Average annual rainfall is 1400 mm across most of the ecoregion, decreasing to 1200 mm in the drier southeast and increasing to 1600 mm along the northern boundary with the Congolian rainforests.

== Flora ==
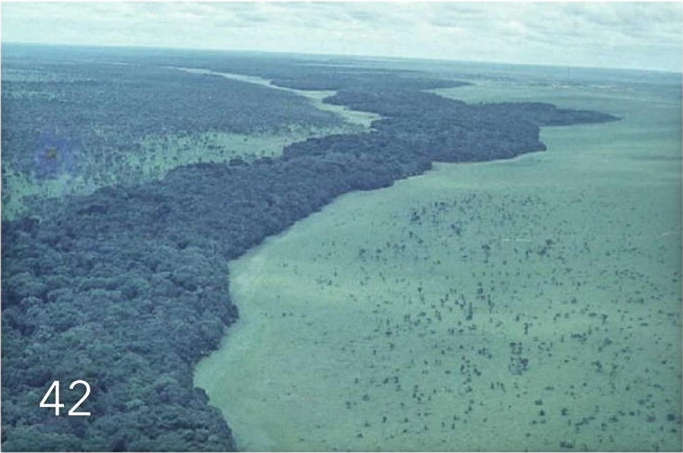
Mosaic of Congolian gallery forest, moist miombo woodland and savanna grassland in Lunda-Norte, northern Angola — Huntley (2019)

The ecoregion is a mosaic of forest, savanna, and grassland. Semi-evergreen rainforest is found along the rivers that drain northwards into the Congo Basin, with open woodland, savanna, and grassland in the uplands. Rainforest flora is typically Guineo-Congolian species, while the woodland, savanna, and grassland species are mostly Zambezian.

== Fauna ==
Large forest mammals include the lowland bongo (Tragelaphus eurycerus eurycerus), blue duiker (Philantomba monticola), and yellow-backed duiker (Cephalophus silvicultor). Large mammals of the savannas and grasslands include African bush elephant (Loxodonta africana), African buffalo (Syncerus caffer), waterbuck (Kobus ellipsiprymnus), and southern reedbuck (Redunca arundinum). Hippopotamus (Hippopotamus amphibius) are found along rivers. Lions (Panthera leo) are the ecoregion's top predators. Bonobos (Pan paniscus) are found in the northern part of the ecoregion, including Lukuru area.

Several small mammals are endemic to the ecoregion, including Gallagher's free-tailed bat (Chaerephon gallagheri), greater Congo shrew (Congosorex polli), Lukolela swamp rat (Malacomys lukolelae), and least soft-furred mouse (Praomys minor).

Endemic and near-endemic reptiles include the African bighead snake (Hypotophis wilsonii), Kabinda worm lizard (Monopeltis kabindae) and the skink Feylinia macrolepis. The Tshimbulu reed frog (Hyperolius polli) is endemic, and the reed frog Hyperolius obscurus is a near-endemic. The Lomami screeching frog (Arthroleptis phrynoides) is a near-endemic which is also found in the Western Congolian forest–savanna mosaic.

== Conservation and threats ==
The political situation in the Democratic Republic of the Congo is unstable; until the country is stable, no important conservation work is likely.

=== Protected areas ===
A 2017 assessment found that 19,841 km^{2}, or 4%, of the ecoregion is in protected areas. Protected areas include Lomami National Park, Mangai Nature Reserve (1903.33 km^{2}), Bushimaie Hunting Reserve (4368.7 km^{2}), and Luama-Kivu Hunting Area (3,900.28 km^{2}).
