= Eastern Congolian swamp forests =

Ecoregion within the Democratic Republic of the Congo

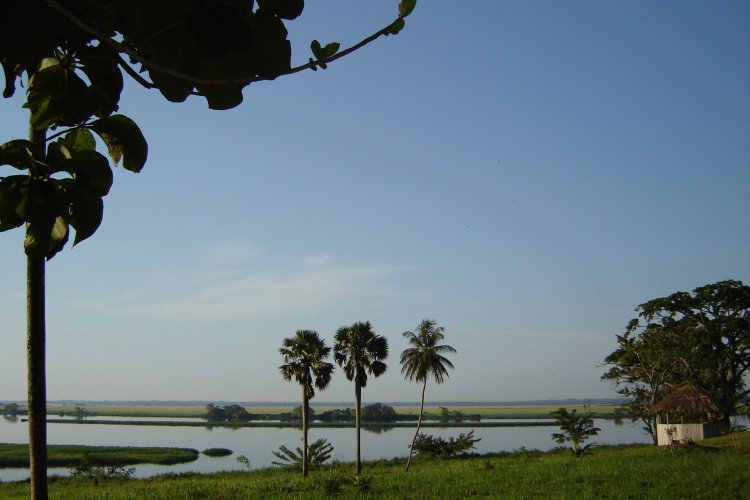
- Tumba-Ngiri-Maindombe, the largest RAMSAR wetland in the world

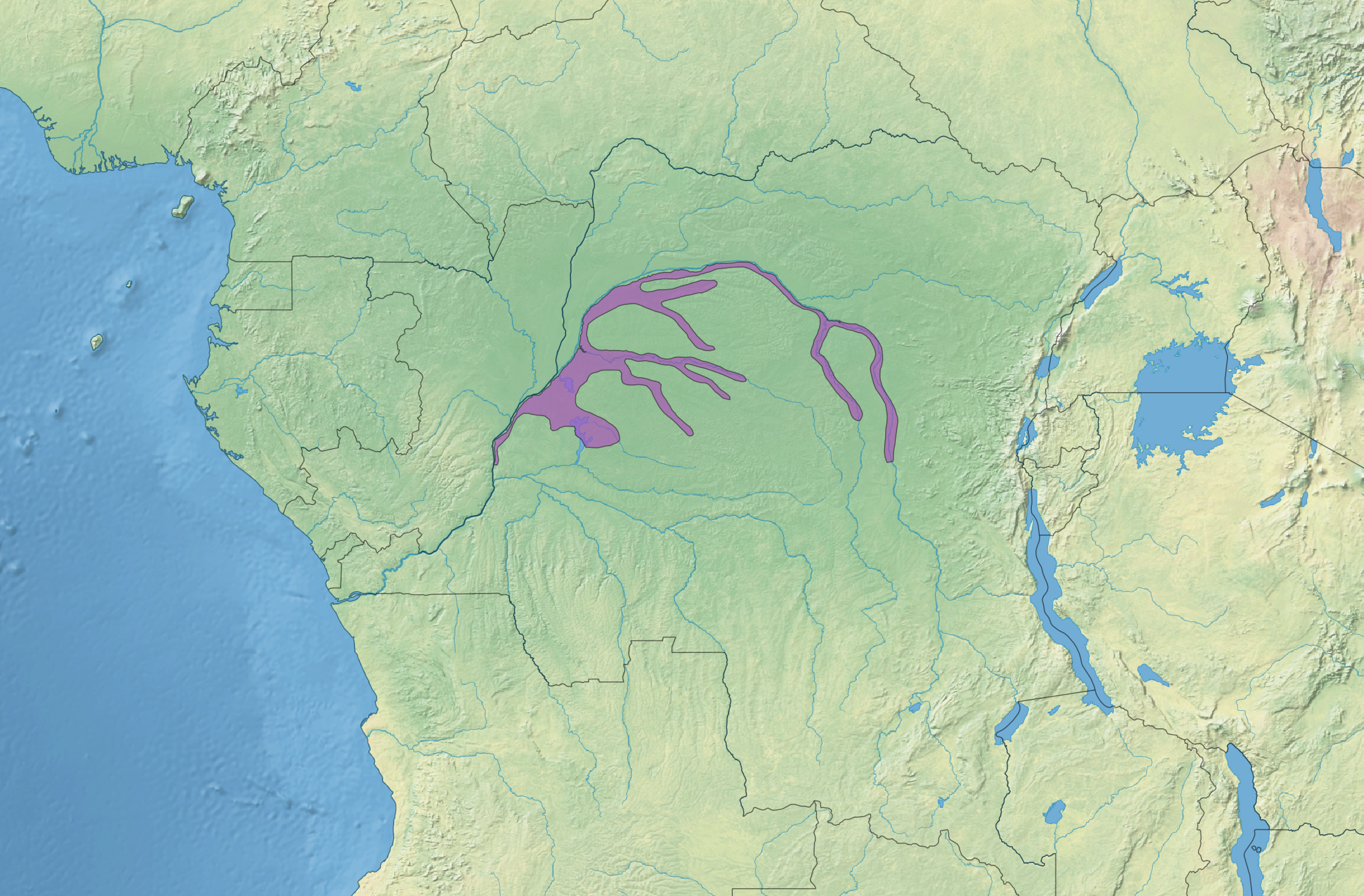
- Map of the Eastern Congolian swamp forests

Ecology
- Realm: Afrotropical
- Biome: Tropical and subtropical moist broadleaf forests
- Borders: List: Central Congolian lowland forests; Northeast Congolian lowland forests; Southern Congolian forest–savanna mosaic; Western Congolian forest–savanna mosaic; Western Congolian swamp forests

Geography
- Area: 92,315 km^{2} (35,643 sq mi)
- Country: Democratic Republic of the Congo
- Coordinates: .7°S 18.2°E

Conservation
- Conservation status: relatively stable
- Protected: 23,092 km^{2} (25%)

The Eastern Congolian swamp forests (French: Forêts marécageuses de l'est du Congo) are a fairly intact but underresearched ecoregion of the tropical and subtropical moist broadleaf forests biome. It is located within the Democratic Republic of the Congo. This is the eastern half of one of the largest areas of swamps in the world.

== Setting ==
The swamp forest is flat, wet forest between 300–400 metres (980–1,310 ft) in elevation on the left bank of the Congo River, and spreading across a swathe of the Congo Basin, including some of the Congo's largest tributaries and the Stanley Falls area near Kisangani.

== Climate ==
The climate is tropical and humid, with little seasonal variation. Average annual rainfall exceeds 2000 mm.

== Flora ==
The forest is a mixture of habitats including wetlands and swamps, with drier forest and savanna slightly higher and flooded seasonally by the Congo and its tributaries.

== Fauna ==
The region has been insufficiently researched by zoologists but is known to be home to forest elephants (Loxodonta africana cyclotis) (which may have been reduced by poaching, especially near the larger rivers), and several primates, including the rare bonobo (Pan paniscus). The Congo is a natural barrier to movement of wildlife and many species only occur on this eastern side of the river, including many primates: the bonobo and also Angolan colobus (Colobus angolensis), Wolf's mona monkey (Cercopithecus wolfi), golden-bellied mangabey (Cercocebus galeritus chrysogaster), black mangabey (Lophocebus atterimus aterrimus), southern talapoin (Miopithecus talapoin) and the Dryas monkey (Cercopithecus dryas).

Near-endemic mammals include Hutterer's brush-furred mouse (Lophuromys huttereri), Allen's striped bat (Chalinolobus alboguttatus), and Muton's soft-furred mouse (Praomys mutoni).

These rainforests are rich in birdlife including the Congo sunbird (Cinnyris congensis), African river martin (Pseudochelidon eurystomina) and Congo martin (Riparia congica).

Endemic amphibians and reptiles include a small frog (Cryptothylax minutus), Chapin's chameleon (Trioceros chapini), a wall lizard (Gastropholis tropidopholis), the Zaire snake-eater (Polemon robustus), and a worm lizard (Zygaspis dolichomenta).

== Threats and conservation ==
The Congo River allows access to these forests with subsequent logging and poaching of wildlife, particularly of forest elephants.

=== Protected areas ===
25.65% of the ecoregion is in protected areas. Protected areas include the huge Salonga National Park, Lomami National Park, Yangambi Biosphere Reserve, Lomako-Yokokala Nature Reserve, and Tumba-Lediima Nature Reserve. Salonga National Park is also designated a World Heritage Site. The Ngiri Ramsar Site, a designated wetland of international importance, covers a portion of the ecoregion.

== See also ==
- Congolian forests
- Flora of West-Central Tropical Africa
