= Bomu =

Bomu may refer to:

- Bomu language, a language of West Africa
  - Distinct from the standard variety of the Dogon language of West Africa, known Toro so and as Bomu Tegu or just Bomu in the plains languages; see Escarpment Dogon
- The Mbomou River, also called the Bomu river, a river forming part of the Central African Republic—Democratic Republic of the Congo border
- Domaine Chasse Bomu, a nature reserve in the Democratic Republic of the Congo whose name translates as Bomu Strict Nature Reserve
- Bomu or baimu refers to the wood of several species of Cupressaceae used in China for furniture
- Botswana Music Union, the Recording Industry of Botswana's music industry awards

== See also ==
- Mwachirunge Bomu, a settlement in Kenya's Coastal Province
