= Forest–savanna mosaic =

Forest in dry regions

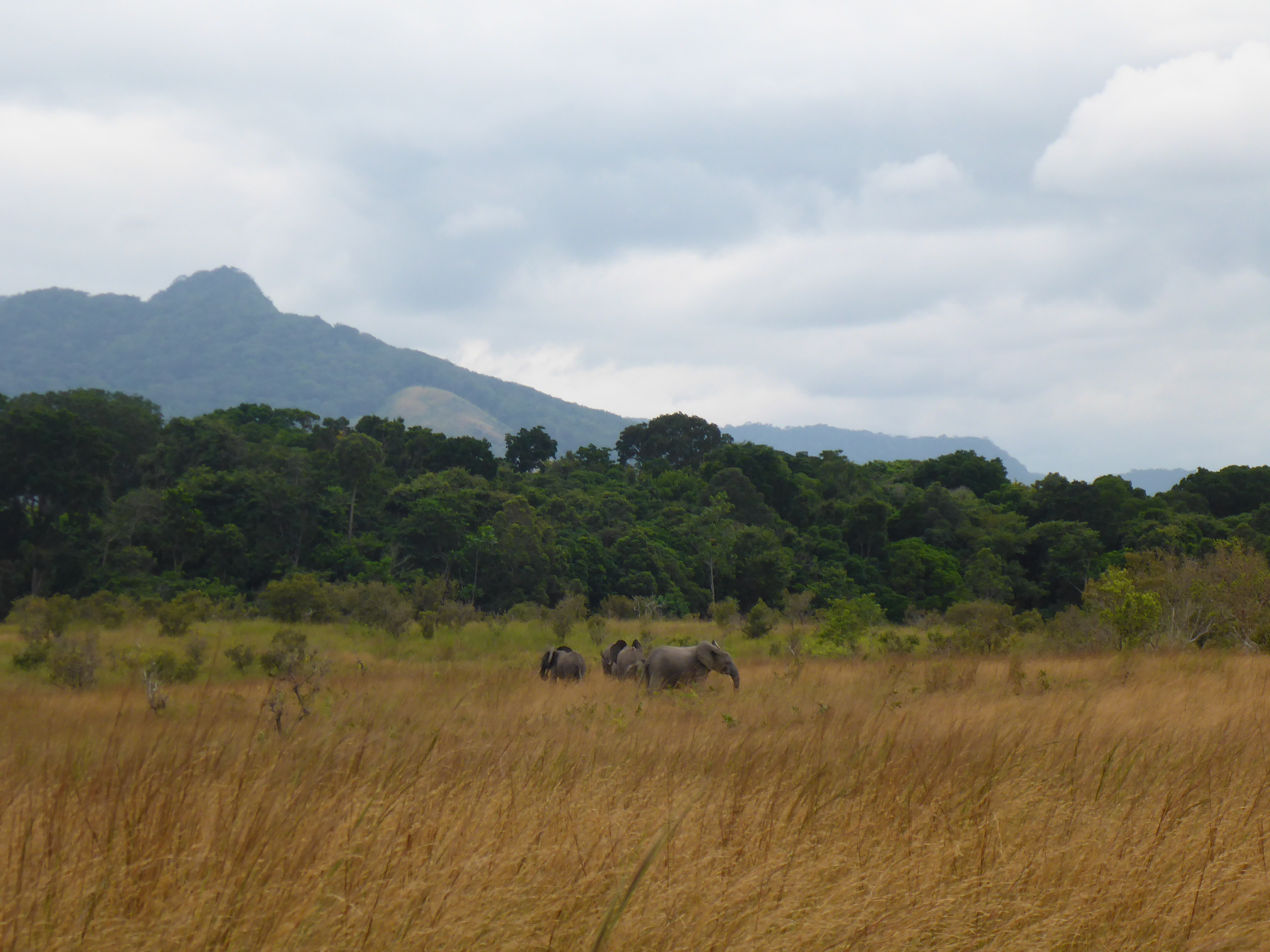
Elephants forage In a forest-savanna mosaic in Lopé National Park.

Forest–savanna mosaic is a transitory ecotone between the tropical moist broadleaf forests of Equatorial Africa and the drier savannas and open woodlands to the north and south of the forest belt. The forest–savanna mosaic consists of drier forests, often gallery forest, interspersed with savannas and open grasslands.

== Flora ==
This band of marginal savannas bordering the dense dry forest extends from the Atlantic coast of Guinea to South Sudan, corresponding to a climatic zone with relatively high rainfall, between 800 and 1400 mm. It is an often unresolvable, complex of secondary forests and mixed savannas, resulting from intense erosion of primary forests by fire and clearing. The vegetation ceases to have an evergreen character, and becomes more and more seasonal. A species of acacia, Faidherbia albida, marks, with its geographical distribution, the Guinean area of the savannas together with the area of the forest-savanna, arboreal and shrub, and a good part of the dense dry forest with prevalently deciduous trees.

== Ecoregions ==
The World Wildlife Fund recognizes several distinct forest-savanna mosaic ecoregions:

- The Guinean forest–savanna mosaic is the transition between the Upper and Lower Guinean forests of West Africa and the West Sudanian savanna. The ecoregion extends from Senegal on the west to the Cameroon Highlands on the east. The Dahomey Gap is a region of Togo and Benin where the forest-savanna mosaic extends to the coast, separating the Upper and Lower Guinean forests.
- The Northern Congolian forest–savanna mosaic lies between the Congolian forests of Central Africa and the East Sudanian savanna. It extends from the Cameroon Highlands in the west to the East African Rift in the east, encompassing portions of Cameroon, Central African Republic, Democratic Republic of the Congo, and southwestern Sudan.
- The Western Congolian forest–savanna mosaic lies southwest of the Congolian forest belt, covering portions of southern Gabon, southern Republic of the Congo, western Democratic Republic of the Congo, and northwestern Angola.
- The Southern Congolian forest–savanna mosaic lies east of the Western Congolian forest savanna mosaic in the Democratic Republic of the Congo, separating the Congolian forests to the north from the Miombo woodlands to the south.
- The Victoria Basin forest–savanna mosaic lies to the east and north of Lake Victoria in East Africa, and is surrounded on the east and west by the montane forests of the East African Rift's Western and Eastern arcs. The ecoregion covers much of Uganda, extending into portions of eastern Kenya, northwestern Tanzania, and eastern Rwanda.
