= Congolian rainforests =

Broad belt of rainforest in Central Africa

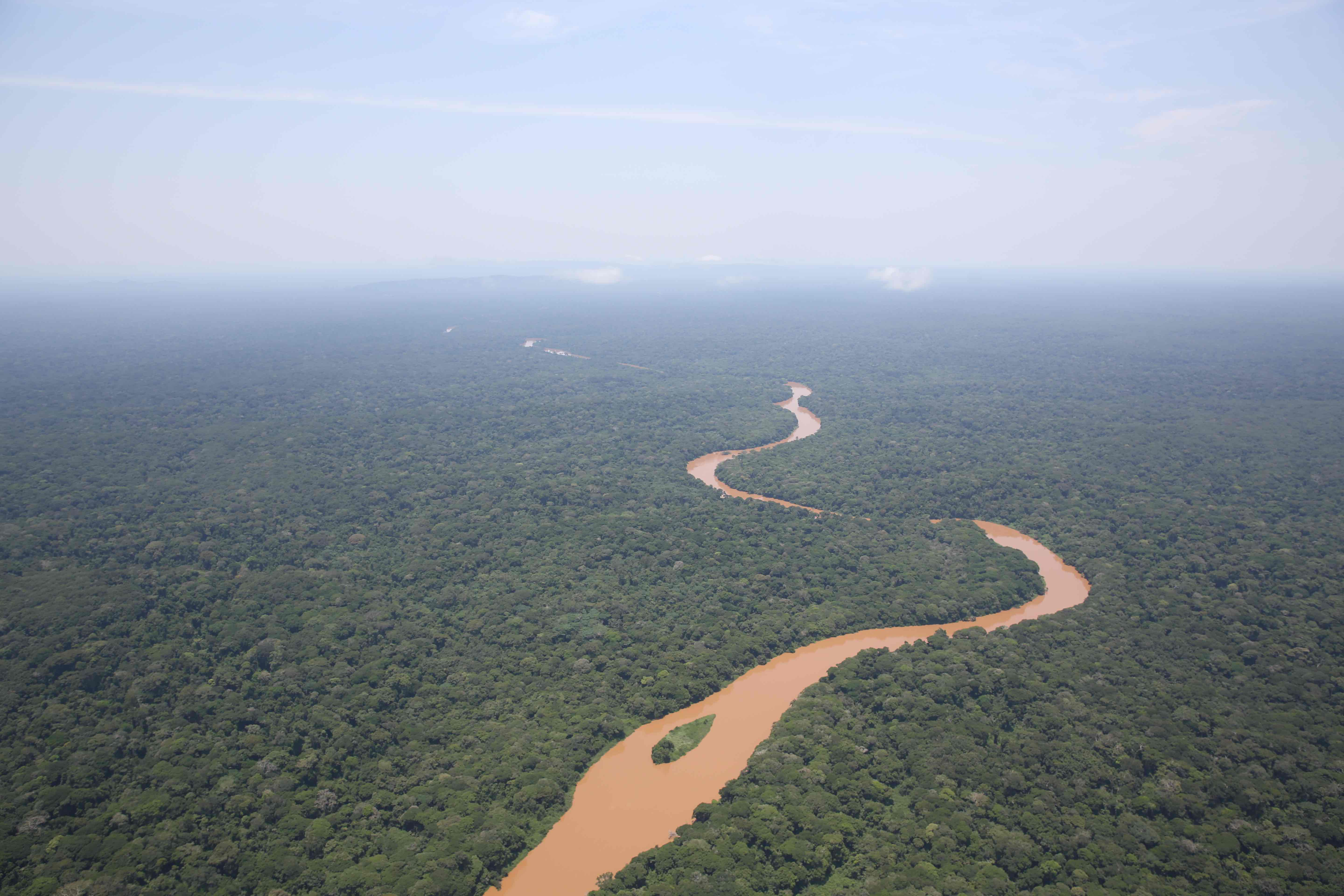
- Aerial view of the Okapi Wildlife Reserve

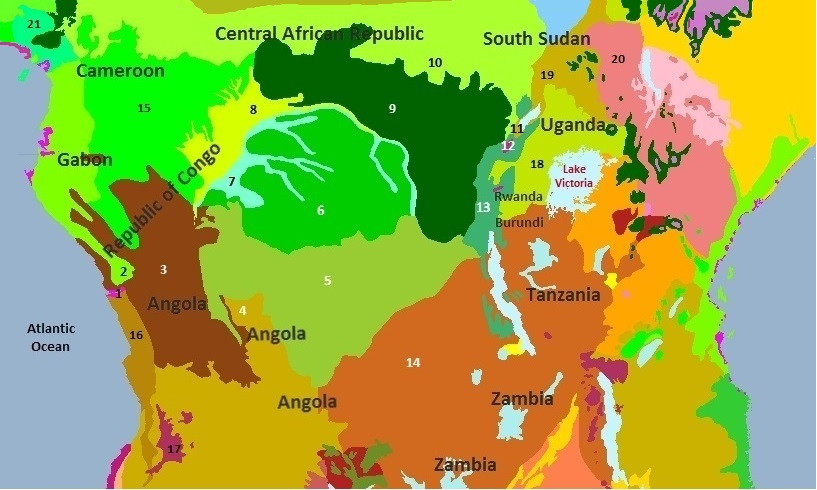
- Congolian rainforest ecoregions: 2. Atlantic Equatorial coastal forests, 6. Central Congolian lowland forests 7. Eastern Congolian swamp forests, 8. Western Congolian swamp forests, 9. Northeastern Congolian lowland forests, 15. Northwestern Congolian lowland forests

Ecology
- Realm: Afrotropical
- Biome: Tropical and subtropical moist broadleaf forests

Geography
- Countries: List: Angola (Cabinda); Cameroon; Central African Republic; Democratic Republic of the Congo; Republic of the Congo; Equatorial Guinea; Gabon

The Congolian rainforests (French: Forêts tropicales congolaises) are a broad belt of lowland tropical moist broadleaf forests which extend across the basin of the Congo River and its tributaries in Central Africa.

== Description ==
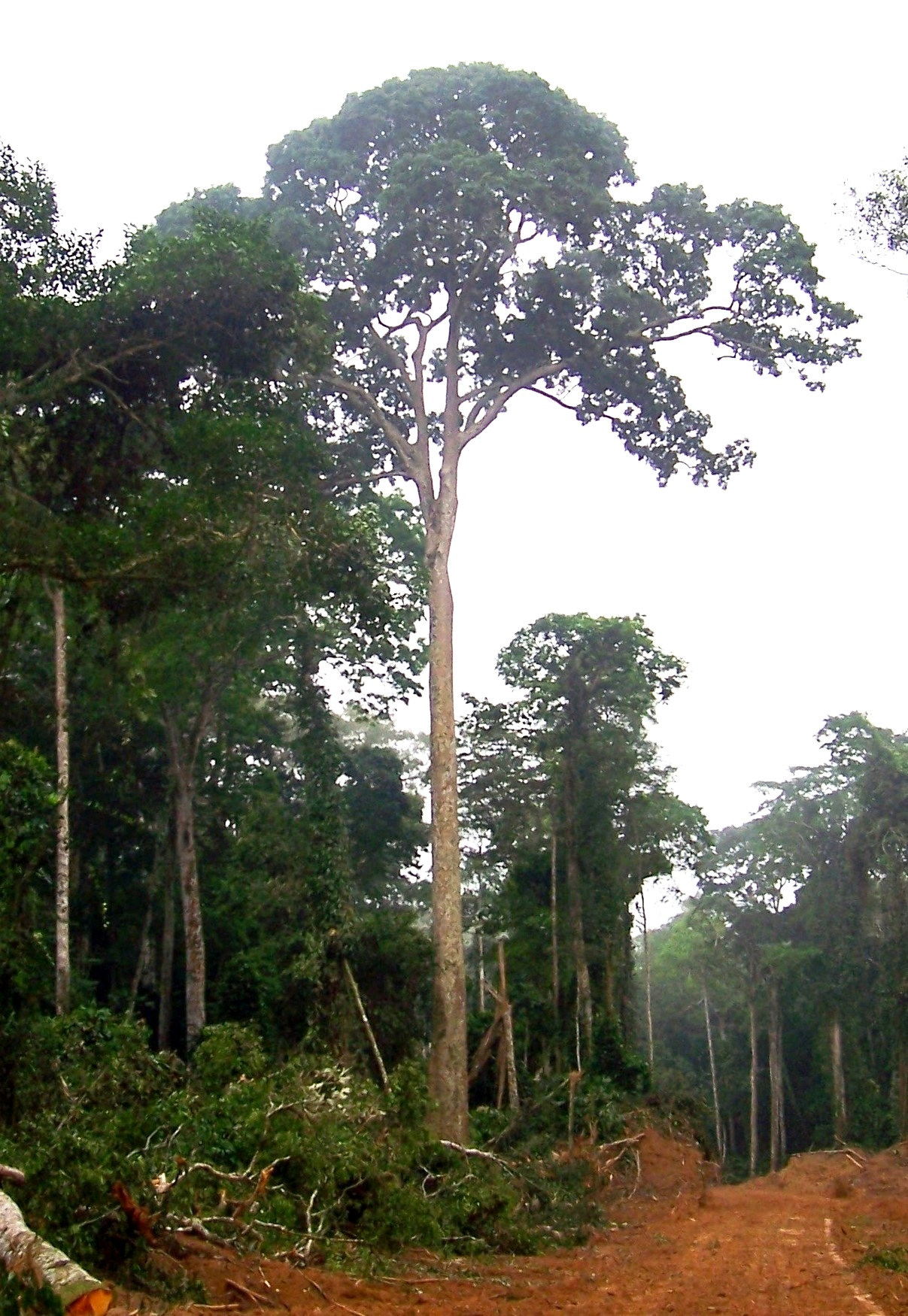
A Sapele tree in the Republic of the Congo

The Congolian rainforest is the world's second-largest tropical forest, after the Amazon rainforest. It covers over 500,000,000 acres (2,000,000 km^{2}) across six countries and contains a quarter of the world's remaining tropical forest. The Congolian forests cover southeastern Cameroon, Gabon, Republic of the Congo, the northern and central Democratic Republic of the Congo, and portions of southern and central Africa. The Congolian rainforest is home to a large number of flora and fauna, including more than 10,000 species of plants and over 10,000 species of animals. It is estimated that the region contains more than a quarter of the world's plant species and is home to one of the world's most threatened primate species, the western lowland gorilla. There are also a number of other species of primates, including the chimpanzee, black colobus monkey, red colobus monkey, and olive baboon.

The central Congo Basin is home to one of the world's largest tropical peatlands, extending along both sides of the Congo River and its tributaries. The peat swamp forests in the Congo Basin store approximately 29 billion tons of carbon - equivalent to about three years worth of global greenhouse gas emissions.

To the north, south, and southwest, the forests transition to drier forest-savanna mosaic, a mosaic of drier forests, savannas, and grasslands. To the west, the Congolian forests transition to the coastal Lower Guinean forests, which extend from southwestern Cameroon into southern Nigeria and Benin; these forest zones share many similarities and are sometimes known as the Lower Guinean-Congolian forests. To the east, the lowland Congolian forests transition to the highland Albertine Rift montane forests, which cover the mountains lining the Albertine Rift, a branch of the East African Rift system.

=== Ecoregions ===
The World Wide Fund for Nature divides the Congolian forests into six distinct ecoregions:

- Atlantic Equatorial coastal forests (Angola, Cameroon, Republic of the Congo, Democratic Republic of the Congo, Equatorial Guinea, and Gabon)
- Central Congolian lowland forests (Democratic Republic of the Congo)
- Eastern Congolian swamp forests (Democratic Republic of the Congo)
- Northeastern Congolian lowland forests (Central African Republic and Democratic Republic of the Congo)
- Northwestern Congolian lowland forests (Cameroon, Central African Republic, Gabon, and Republic of the Congo)
- Western Congolian swamp forests (Republic of the Congo and Democratic Republic of the Congo)

== Flora and fauna ==
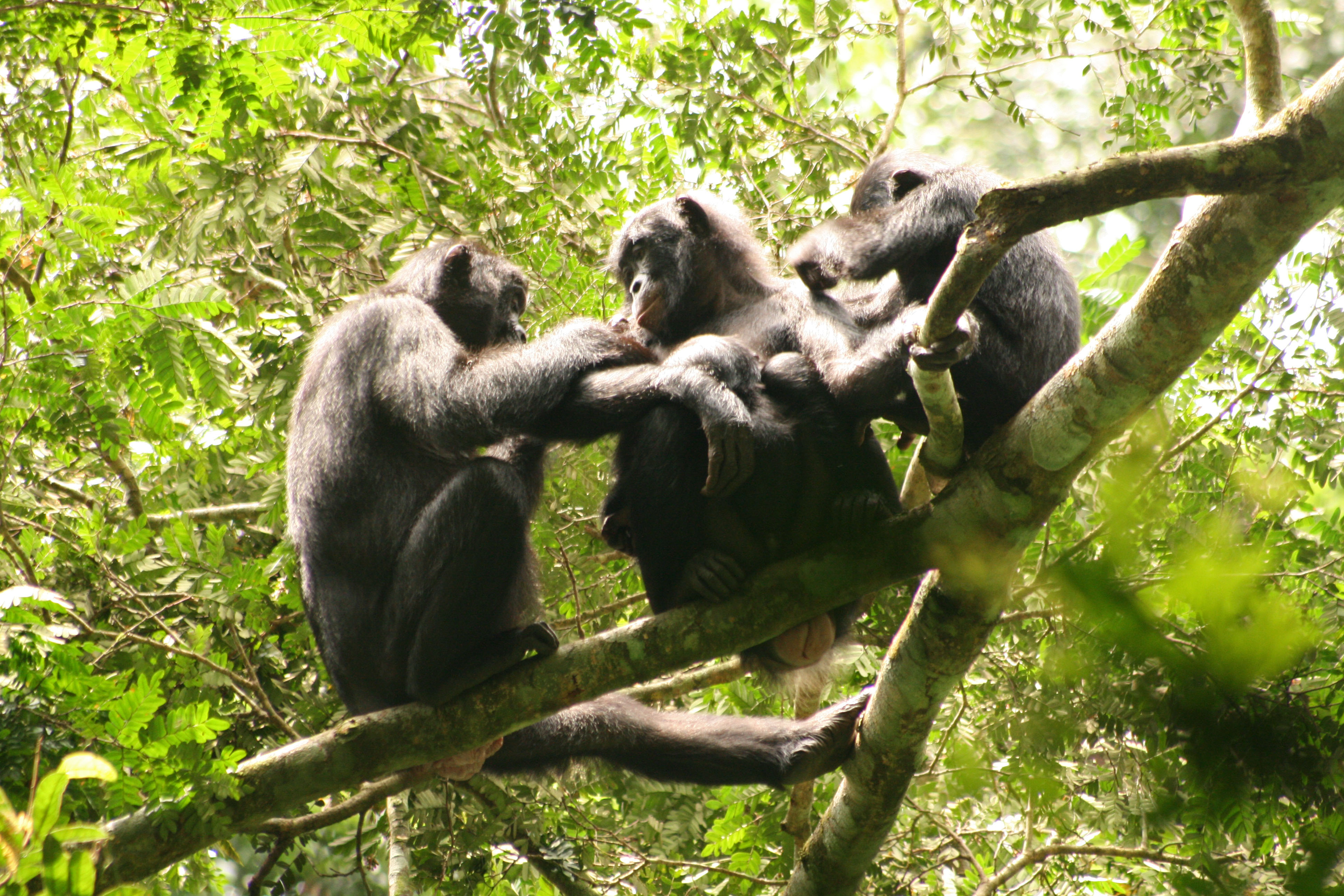
Bonobos live south of the Congo River

The Congolian rainforests are home to over 10,000 species of plants of which 30% are endemic. The Congolian rainforests are less biodiverse than the Amazon's and Southeast Asian's rainforests. However, its plant and animal life is still more rich and varied than most other places on Earth. The Congolian Forests are a global 200 ecoregion.

There are over 400 species of mammals in the rainforest, including African forest elephants, African bush elephants, leopards, bongos, red river hogs, chimpanzees, bonobos, mountain gorillas, and lowland gorillas. The okapi is endemic to the northeastern Congolian rainforests.

The rainforests have 1,000 native species of birds like the grey parrot, brown nightjar and the bat hawk, and 700 species of fish like the Nile tilapia, Nile perch and the giraffe catfish.

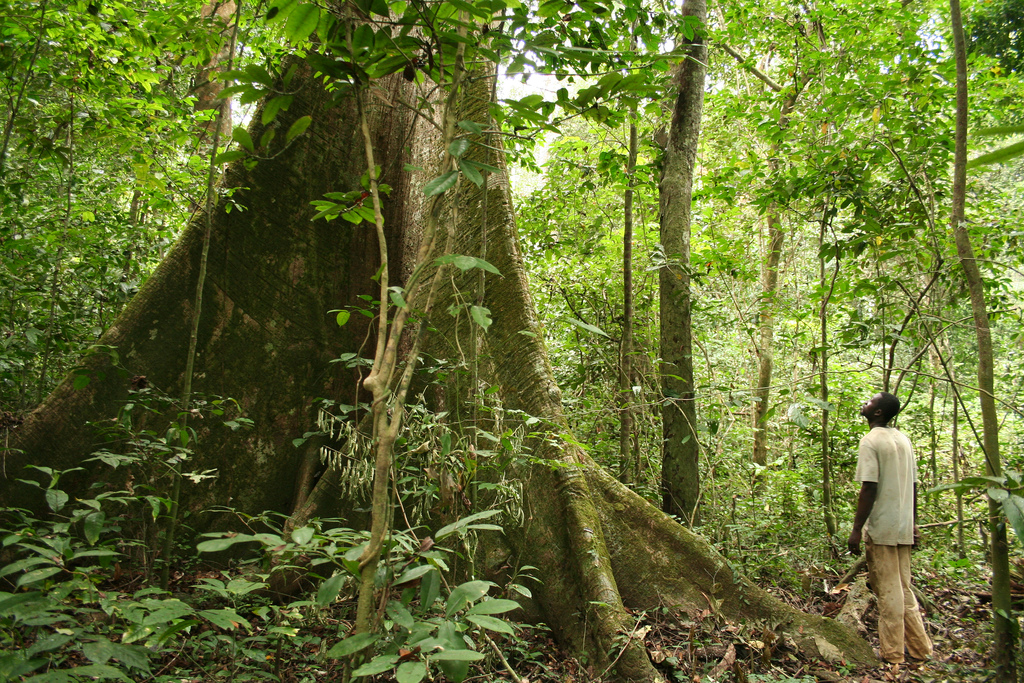
Rainforest in Gabon

== Conservation ==
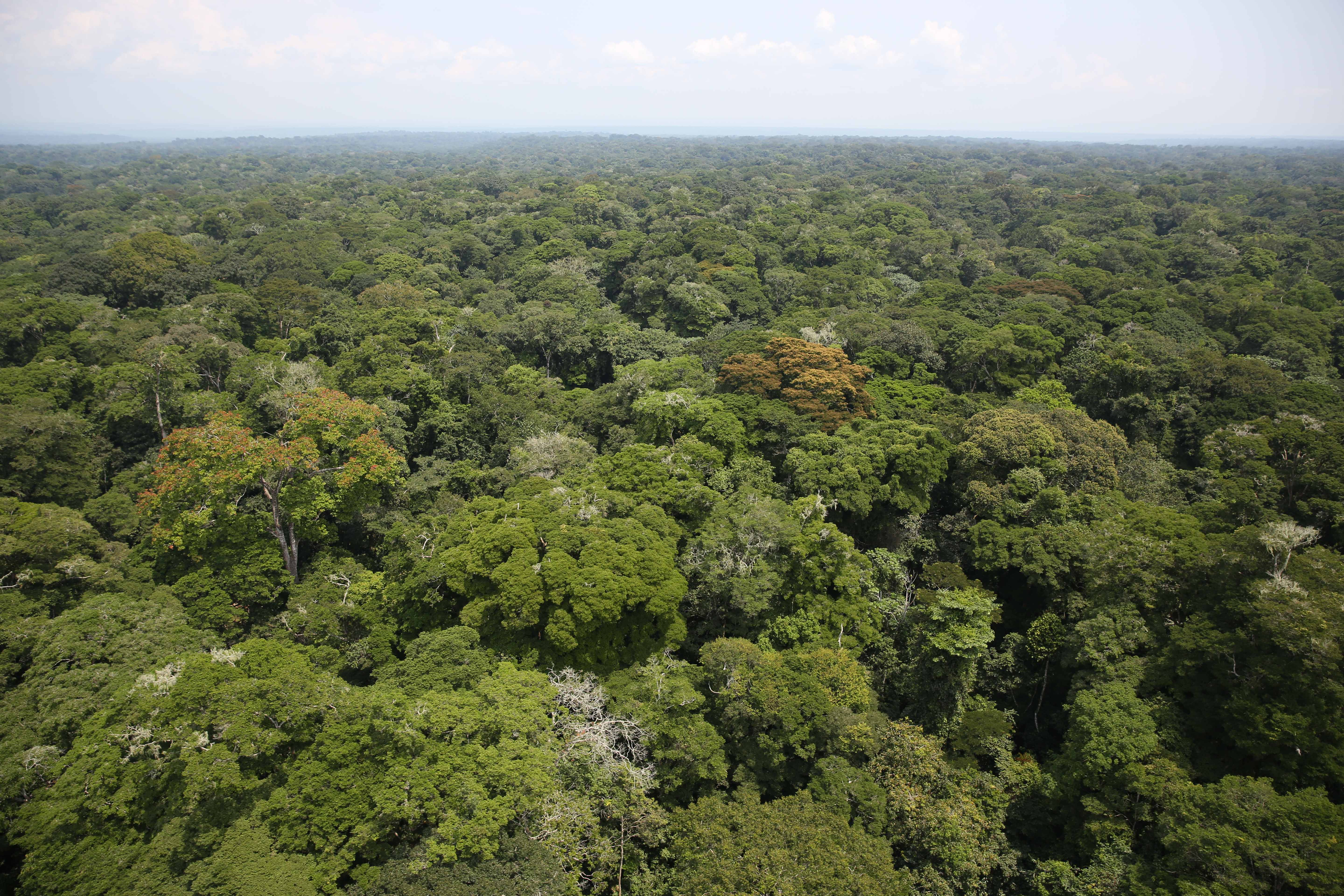
The rainforest from above

Threats to the rainforests include destruction and fragmentation of forests by commercial logging, oil palm plantations, and mining. The bushmeat trade and poaching is depleting the rainforests of wildlife. With annual forest loss of 0.3% during the 2000s, the region had the lowest deforestation rate of any major tropical forest zone. From 2015 to 2019, the rate of deforestation in the Democratic Republic of the Congo doubled. In 2021, deforestation of the Congolese rainforest increased by 5%. Over the past 20 years, 17.1 million hectares of forest have been cut down.
