= Eupatorium lancifolium =

Lanceleaf thoroughwort

Conservation status
- Vulnerable (NatureServe)

Scientific classification
- Kingdom: Plantae
- Clade: Tracheophytes
- Clade: Angiosperms
- Clade: Eudicots
- Clade: Asterids
- Order: Asterales
- Family: Asteraceae
- Genus: Eupatorium
- Species: E. lancifolium

Binomial name
- Eupatorium lancifolium (Torr. & A.Gray) Small

Synonyms
- Eupatorium parviflorum var. lancifolium Torr. & A. Gray 1841; Eupatorium semiserratum var. lancifolium (Torr. & A. Gray) A. Gray

Species of flowering plant

Eupatorium lancifolium, commonly called lanceleaf thoroughwort or lanceleaf eupatorium, is a North American herbaceous perennial plant in the family Asteraceae native to the south-central United States (Mississippi, Alabama, Arkansas, Louisiana and Texas).

It is related to Eupatorium semiserratum and has sometimes been considered to be part of that species, but can be distinguished by the size and color of the leaves and because it grows in wetter areas.
