= Tumba-Lediima Nature Reserve =

Protected area in the Democratic Republic of the Congo

- Réserve naturelle de Tumba-Lediima
- Location within Democratic Republic of the Congo
- Location: Mai-Ndombe and Équateur provinces, Democratic Republic of the Congo
- Coordinates: 1°30′S 17°18′E
- Area: 7,411.77 km^{2} (2,861.70 sq mi)
- Designation: Nature reserve
- Designated: 2006
- Governing body: Institut Congolais pour la Conservation de la Nature

Tumba-Lediima Nature Reserve is a protected area in the Democratic Republic of the Congo. It lies immediately east of the Congo River, in Mai-Ndombe and Équateur provinces, and extends from east of the town of Yumbi to just south of the town of Liranga.

It protects a portion of the eastern Congolian swamp forests.

The reserve was designated in 2006, and covers an area of 7411.77 km^{2}.

The reserve, along with Ngiri Triangle Nature Reserve to the northeast, is part of the Triangle de la Ngiri Ramsar Site, a designated wetland of international importance covering 65,696.24 km^{2}.
