= Bushimaie Hunting Reserve =

- IUCN category VI (protected area with sustainable use of natural resources)
- Location: Kasai-Central, Democratic Republic of the Congo
- Area: 4,368.7 km^{2} (1,686.8 sq mi)
- Designation: Hunting area
- Designated: 1958
- Governing body: Institut Congolais pour la Conservation de la Nature

Bushimaie Hunting Reserve is a protected area in Kasai-Central Province of the Democratic Republic of the Congo. It was established in 1958, and has an area is 4,368.7 square kilometres (1,686.8 sq mi).

The reserve is in the Southern Congolian forest–savanna mosaic ecoregion.
