= Western Congolian swamp forests =

Ecoregion in Africa

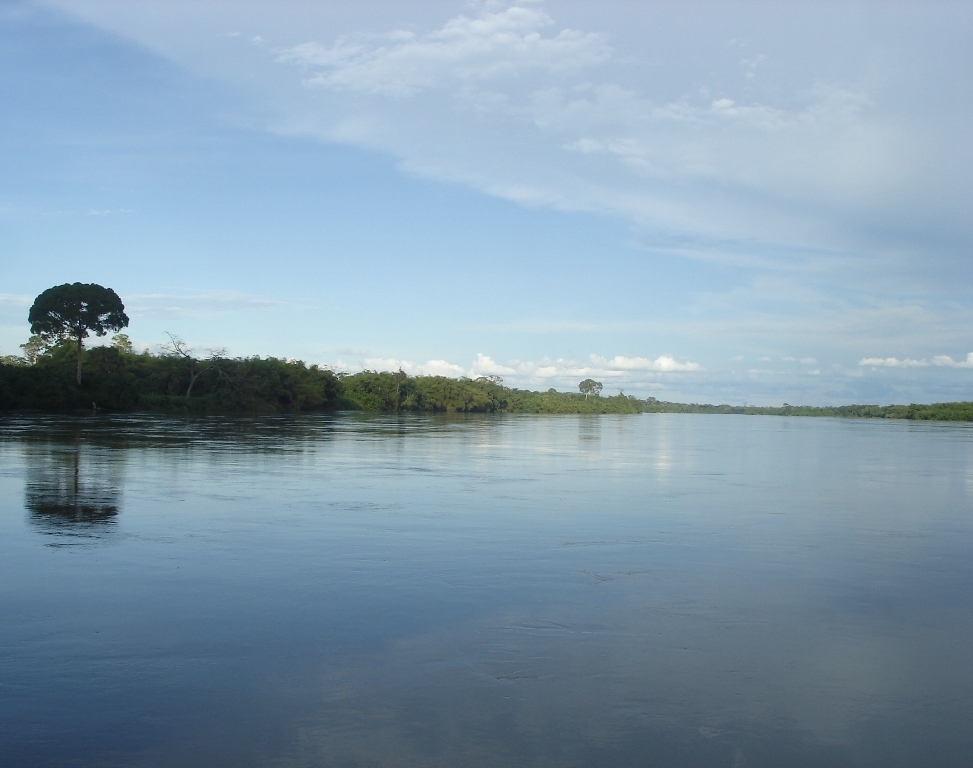
- Congo River near Kisangani

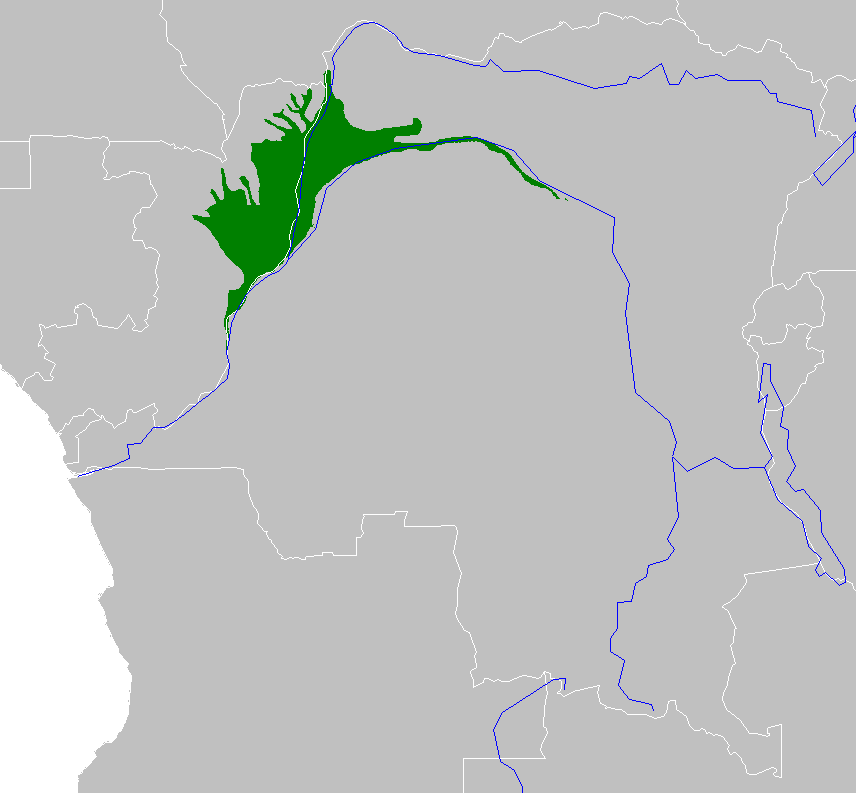
- Map of the Western Congolian swamp forests

Ecology
- Realm: Afrotropical
- Biome: Tropical and subtropical moist broadleaf forests
- Borders: Eastern Congolian swamp forests; Northeast Congolian lowland forests; Northwest Congolian lowland forests; Western Congolian forest–savanna mosaic

Geography
- Area: 128,060 km^{2} (49,440 mi^{2})
- Countries: Democratic Republic of the Congo; Republic of the Congo; Central African Republic
- Coordinates: 1.25°N 18.10°E

Conservation
- Conservation status: relatively stable
- Protected: 52,662 km^{2} (41%)

The Western Congolian swamp forests (French: Forêts marécageuses de l'ouest du Congo) are an ecoregion of the Republic of the Congo, Democratic Republic of the Congo and adjoining Central African Republic. Together with the adjacent Eastern Congolian swamp forests, it forms one of the largest continuous areas of freshwater swamp forest in the world. It is a flooded forest with a high canopy, dense undergrowth and has a muddy floor. It has not been disturbed very much by outside influences and so remains largely pristine as getting through this forest is said to be "almost impossible".

== Location and description ==
This ecoregion stretches for 1,200 km along the west bank of the Congo River, from the town of Bolobo in the southwest to Yangambi in the east, both in the Democratic Republic of the Congo. The bulk of the territory is on the western half of this stretch; the eastern river portion is only a thin strip of group along the river. Mean elevation is 338 meters, ranging from 258 meters to 497 meters. Much of the terrain sits on flooded and saturated soils classified as gleysols. The region is heavily forested and sparsely populated.

The Congo River separates this ecoregion from the Eastern Congolian swamp forests to the south. The river can be quite wide (up to15 km) and braided through alluvial islands. The swamp forest follows the tributaries of the Congo River, including the Likouala-Mossaka, Likouala-aux-Herbes, the Ubangi River (which is the main river flowing north-south through the center of the region before it meets the Congo), and the Kouyou River. To the northwest are the Northwest Congolian lowland forests, and to the east the Northeast Congolian lowland forests.

== Climate ==
The climate of the ecoregion is Tropical rainforest climate (Köppen climate classification (Af)). This climate is characterized as hot, humid, and having at least 60 mm of precipitation every month. The rainy season is August to February.

== Flora and fauna ==
The ecoregion contains areas of permanently flooded swamp forest, seasonally flooded swamp forest, and flooded grassland. The permanently flooded swamp forests are home to extensive stands of Raphia palm. 89% of the ecoregion is closed canopy forest of broadleaf evergreen, another 3% is open forest, 3% is herbaceous cover and the remainder is Trees in the seasonally flooded forests include species of Garcinia and Manilkara.

The ecoregion is home to the endangered western lowland gorilla (Gorilla gorilla gorilla) and African forest elephant (Loxodonta cyclotis).

== Protected areas ==
59.4% of the ecoregion is in protected areas. They include:

- Ngiri Triangle Nature Reserve
- Léfini Wildlife Reserve – Léfini Area of Absolute Protection
- Yangambi Biosphere Reserve
- Lac Télé Community Reserve
- Ntokou-Pikounda National Park

Seven areas are designated Ramsar Sites (wetlands of international importance). Three of them – Ngiri, Lac Télé, and Ntokou-Pikounda, are also nationally designated protected areas.

- Grands affluents
- Libenga
- Lac Télé/Likouala-aux-Herbes
- Ngiri
- Sangha-Nouabalé-Ndoki
- Ntokou-Pikounda
- Tchicapika-Owando

== See also ==
- Congolian forests
