= Eupatorium linearifolium =

Scientific classification
- Kingdom: Plantae
- Clade: Tracheophytes
- Clade: Angiosperms
- Clade: Eudicots
- Clade: Asterids
- Order: Asterales
- Family: Asteraceae
- Genus: Eupatorium
- Species: E. linearifolium

Binomial name
- Eupatorium linearifolium Walter 1788 not Michx. 1803

Synonyms
- Eupatorium hyssopifolium var. linearifolium (Walter) Fernald; Uncasia linearifolia (Walter) Greene; Eupatorium cuneifolium Willdenow; Eupatorium glaucescens Elliott; Eupatorium tortifolium Chapman

Species of flowering plant

Eupatorium linearifolium, known as narrowleaf bushy eupatorium, is a fall-blooming herbaceous plant native to North America.

Like other members of the genus Eupatorium it has inflorescences containing a large number of small white flower heads, each with 5 disc florets but no ray florets.

Works such as Flora of North America define E. linearifolium to include all the plants which in the past were treated as E. cuneifolium. The most distinctive feature of E. linearifolium, compared with other Eupatorium species, is that the stems branch near the ground.

Eupatorium linearifolium is found in the southeastern and south-central United States, found in all the coastal states from Texas to Virginia, through probably extirpated from Virginia.
