= Bomu Wildlife Reserve =

Wildlife reserve in the Democratic Republic of the Congo

- IUCN category Ib (wilderness area)
- Location: Bas-Uele, Democratic Republic of the Congo
- Area: 6,541.5 km^{2} (2,525.7 sq mi)
- Designation: Wildlife reserve
- Designated: 1974

The Bomu Wildlife Reserve is a wildlife reserve (IUCN Category Ib) in the Democratic Republic of the Congo. The reserve covers an area of 4,125.6 km^{2} in Bas-Uélé Province. It extends along the south bank of the Mbomou River, which forms the border with the Central African Republic. It adjoins Bili-Uere Hunting Reserve on the south. Bomu Hunting Reserve is upriver to the east.
