= Northwestern Congolian lowland forests =

Tropical forest ecoregion in Central Africa

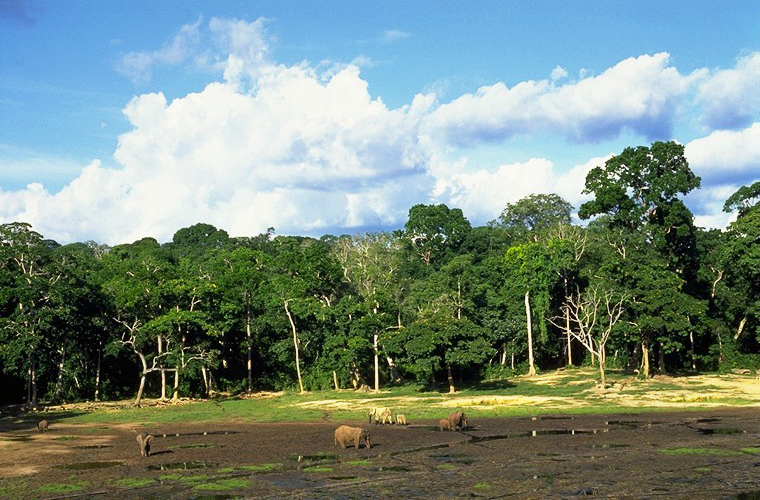
- Elephants in Dzanga-Sangha Special Reserve in the Central African Republic

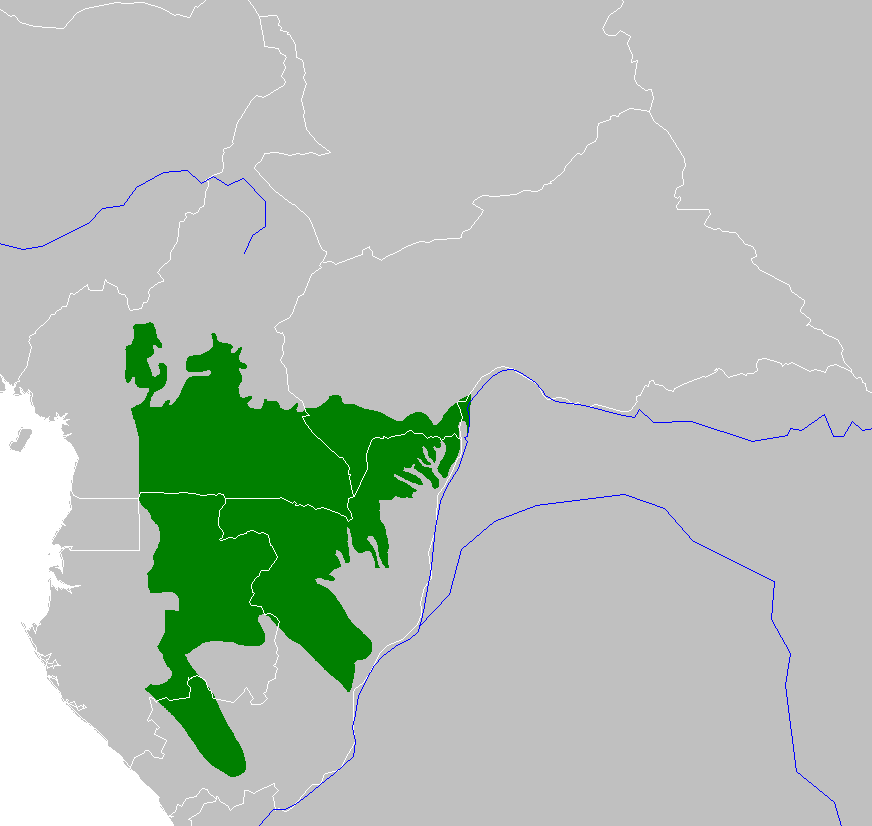
- AT0126. Northwestern Congolian lowland forests

Ecology
- Realm: Afrotropical
- Biome: tropical and subtropical moist broadleaf forests
- Borders: List: Atlantic Equatorial coastal forests; Northeastern Congolian lowland forests; Northern Congolian forest–savanna mosaic; Western Congolian forest–savanna mosaic; Western Congolian swamp forests
- Animals: Western lowland gorilla

Geography
- Area: 434,082 km^{2} (167,600 sq mi)
- Countries: List: Cameroon; Central African Republic; Gabon; Republic of the Congo; Democratic Republic of the Congo
- Elevation: 80 m to 1,450 m
- Coordinates: 1.60°N 12.30°E

Conservation
- Conservation status: vulnerable
- Global 200: yes
- Protected: 91,395 square kilometres (35,288 sq mi)%

The Northwestern Congolian lowland forests (French: Forêts de plaine du nord-ouest du Congo) is a tropical moist broadleaf forest ecoregion that spans Cameroon, Gabon, the Republic of Congo, the Central African Republic and a minuscule part of the Democratic Republic of the Congo. It forms part of the larger Congolian rainforests region in Central Africa. The region is noteworthy for very high levels of species richness and endemism. It is home to a core population of the critically endangered Western lowland gorilla (Gorilla gorilla gorilla). There are also large populations of forest elephants.

== Location and description ==
The ecoregion is located in western central Africa, across the meeting of Cameroon, Gabon, Republic of Congo, and the Central African Republic (CAR). It stretches 500 km west-to-east and 700 km north-to south, set back 250 km from the Gulf of Guinea. Mean elevation is 530 meters, ranging from 79 meters to 1,451 meters. The highest areas are in the Chaillu Mountains of south Gabon and the Republic of Congo in the south. Much of the terrain sits on a heavily leached red oxisols. The region is heavily forested and sparsely populated.

The surrounding ecoregions are the Congolian coastal forests to the west, the Northern Congolian forest–savanna mosaic to the north, the Western Congolian forest–savanna mosaic to the south, and the Western Congolian swamp forests to the east.

== Climate ==
The climate of the ecoregion is Tropical monsoon climate (Köppen climate classification (Am)). This climate is characterized by relatively even temperatures throughout the year (all months being greater than 18 °C (64 °F) average temperature). This climate is mid-way between a tropical rainforest and a tropical savannah. Minimum temperatures range from 18 to 21 degrees (C) to 27 to 30 degrees (C). Precipitation ranges from 1,400 mm/year to 2,000 mm/year in the center of the ecoregion.

== Flora and fauna ==
Over 90% of the ecoregion is closed forest of broadleaf evergreen. Another 6% is other types of open or closed forest, and 3% is herbaceous cover. Characteristic tree species are Entandrophragma congoense, Pentaclethera eetveldeana, Pericopsis elata (also known as African teak), and Gilbertiodendron dewevrei. Raffia palm is found along the rivers.

Primates richness is the highest in Africa; Cameroon alone has 29 species of primate, including the Western lowland gorilla, the vulnerable mandrill (Mandrillus sphinx), and the endangered Chimpanzee (Pan troglodytes).

== Protected areas ==
A 2017 assessment found that 91,395 km^{2}, or 21%, of the ecoregion is within protected areas. 40% of the unprotected area is still forested. Protected areas include:

- Boumba Bek National Park, (Cameroon)
- Dja Faunal Reserve, (Cameroon)
- Lobéké National Park, (Cameroon)
- Nki National Park (Cameroon),
- Dzanga-Ndoki National Park (Central African Republic),
- Dzanga-Sangha Special Reserve, (Central African Republic)
- Nouabale-Ndoki National Park, (Central African Republic)
- Odzala-Kokoua National Park (Republic of the Congo), and
- Ivindo National Park, (Gabon)
- Minkébé National Park, (Gabon)
- Mwangne National Park (Gabon).

Dzanga-Sanga, Dzanga-Ndoki, Nouabale-Ndoki, and Lobéké national parks and the Dzanga Sangha Special Reserve form the transboundary Dzanga-Sangha Complex of Protected Areas that extends across 4,589 km^{2} of Cameroon, Central African Republic, and Republic of the Congo.
