= Western Congolian forest–savanna mosaic =

Ecoregion in Africa

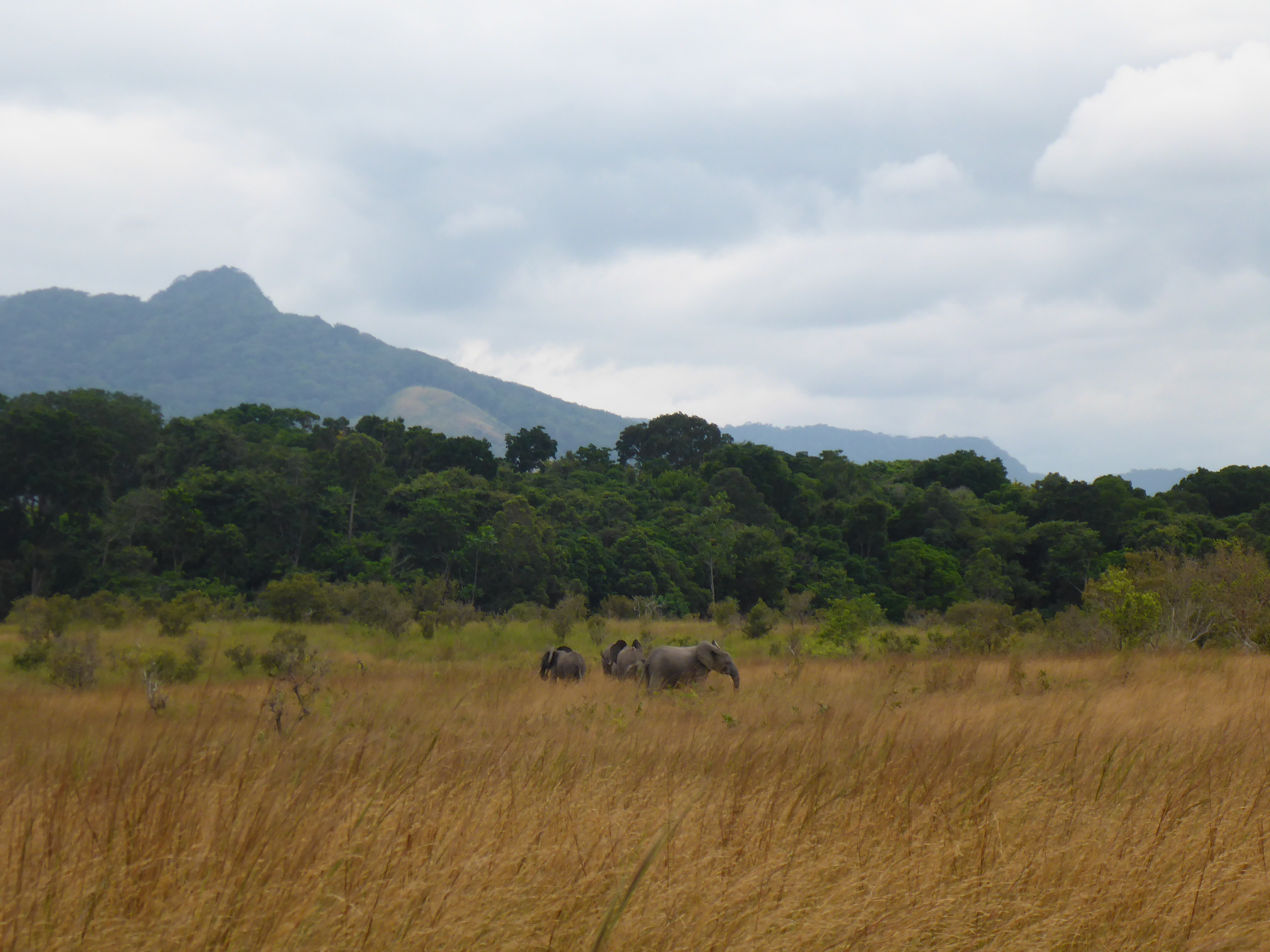
- Elephants in Lopé National Park, Gabon

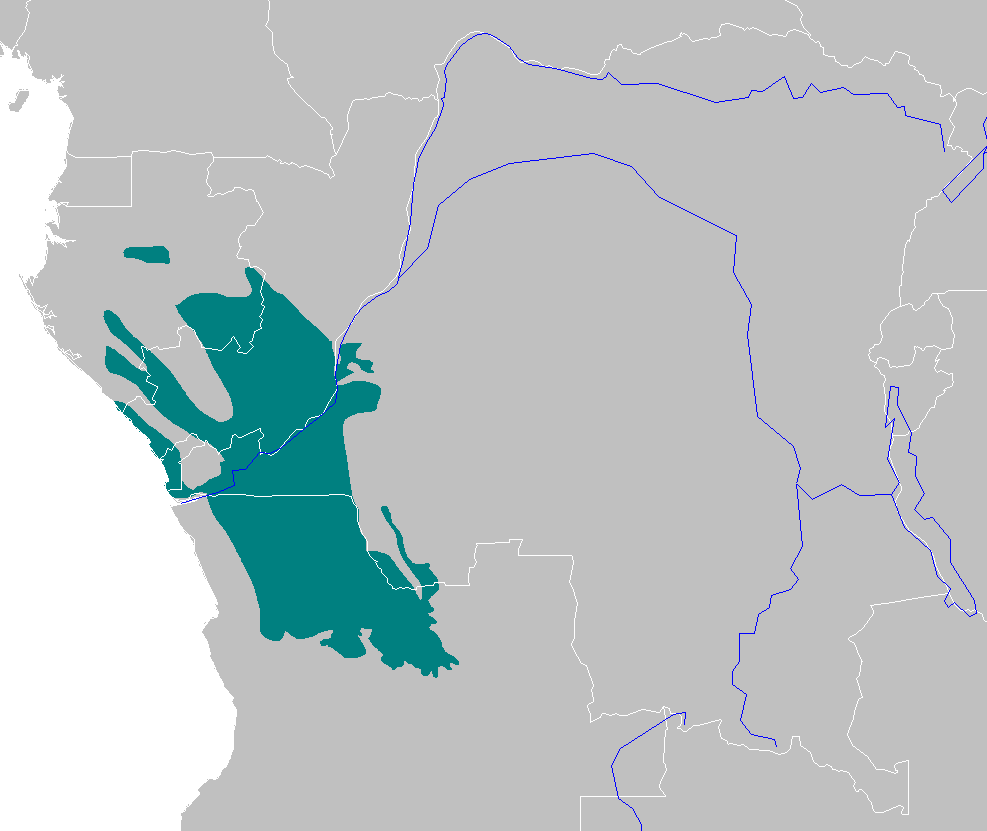
- Map of the Western Congolian forest–savanna mosaic

Ecology
- Realm: Afrotropical
- Biome: Tropical and subtropical grasslands, savannas, and shrublands
- Borders: List: Angolan miombo woodlands; Angolan Scarp savanna and woodlands; Atlantic Equatorial coastal forests; Central African mangroves; Central Congolian lowland forests; Eastern Congolian swamp forests; Northwestern Congolian lowland forests; Southern Congolian forest–savanna mosaic; Western Congolian swamp forests

Geography
- Area: 413,400 km^{2} (159,600 sq mi)
- Countries: Angola; Democratic Republic of the Congo; Republic of the Congo, Gabon
- Elevation: 0–900 meters

Conservation
- Conservation status: relatively stable
- Protected: 6.42%

The Western Congolian forest–savanna mosaic is an ecoregion of Angola, Democratic Republic of the Congo, Republic of the Congo, and Gabon.

== Geography ==
The forest–savanna mosaic covers a region of dissected plateaus lying between the Congo Basin on the east and the Atlantic Ocean to the west. The lower Congo River passes through the ecoregion.

The ecoregion is bounded on the northwest by the humid Atlantic Equatorial coastal forests, which extend north from the Congo River along the Atlantic coast. The Northwestern Congolian lowland forests lie to the north and northeast. The Southern Congolian forest–savanna mosaic bounds the ecoregion on the east, south of the Congo River. The Angolan miombo woodlands lie to the southeast and south. The Angolan Scarp savanna and woodlands lies to the southwest along the Atlantic coast, extending south from the Congo River's mouth.

The cities of Kinshasa and Brazzaville, capitals of the two Congo republics, are in the ecoregion, located opposite one another on the Congo River. Other cities in the ecoregion include Matadi and Cabinda.

== Climate ==
The climate is tropical, with little seasonal variation. Mean maximum temperatures range from 30 °C in the lowlands to 21 °C on the high plateaus, and mean minimum temperatures range from 21º to 15 °C. Rainfall averages 1200 mm per year, increasing to 1400 mm at the transition to the coastal and Congolian rainforests.

== Flora ==
The ecoregion is a mosaic of wooded grassland with patches of forest. It includes areas of dry evergreen forest on the Bateke Plateau in the Republic of the Congo, and gallery forests along rivers, particularly the Congo. The species composition of the gallery forest is similar to the Congolian forests to the east.

Mabwati is a dense dry forest community which grows on deposits of Kalahari sand in the eastern portion of the ecoregion, and extend into the adjacent Southern Congolian forest–savanna. The trees Marquesia macroura, Marquesia acuminata, Daniellia alsteeniana, and Berlinia giorgii are characteristic of mabwati's dense canopy.

== Fauna ==
The ecoregion is home to several large mammal species. African buffalo (Syncerus caffer), waterbuck (Kobus ellipsiprymnus), bushbuck (Tragelaphus scriptus), southern reedbuck (Redunca arundinum), yellow-backed duiker (Cephalophus silvicultor) and common duiker (Sylvicapra grimmia) are widespread. Lions (Panthera leo) are the top predator. The African forest elephant (Loxodonta cylcotis) was once widespread but is now threatened and limited in range. The critically endangered western lowland gorilla (Gorilla gorilla gorilla), and endangered central chimpanzee (Pan troglodytes troglodytes) are found north of the Congo River.

Adam's horseshoe bat (Rhinolophus adami) and the velvet climbing mouse (Dendroprionomys rousseloti) are endemic to the ecoregion. The forest horseshoe bat (Rhinolophus silvestris) is a limited-range species, that lives in the forest-savanna and the rainforests north of the Congo River.

There are two endemic bird species, the white-headed robin-chat (Cossypha heinrichi) and orange-breasted bush shrike (Laniarius brauni).

The western Congo worm lizard (Monopeltis guentheri) and Cambondo screeching frog (Arthroleptis carquejai) are endemic to the ecoregion.

== Protected areas ==
6.42% of the ecoregion is in protected areas. Protected areas in the ecoregion include Cangandala National Park, Mayumba National Park, Lopé National Park, Moukalaba-Doudou National Park, Batéké Plateau National Park, Conkouati-Douli National Park, Mangroves Marine Park, Ogooué-Lékéti National Park, Luki Biosphere Reserve, Bombo-Lumene Hunting Area, Léfini Wildlife Reserve, N'Sele Nature Reserve, Tsoulou Wildlife Reserve, Ngyanga Nord Wildlife Reserve, Mont Fouari Wildlife Reserve, Tchimpounga Wildlife Sanctuary, and Lessio-Louna Wildlife Sanctuary.
