= Atlantic Equatorial coastal forests =

Ecoregion of Central Africa

Atlantic Equatorial coastal forests Forêts côtières congolaises Bosques costeros del Congo Florestas costeiras congolesas
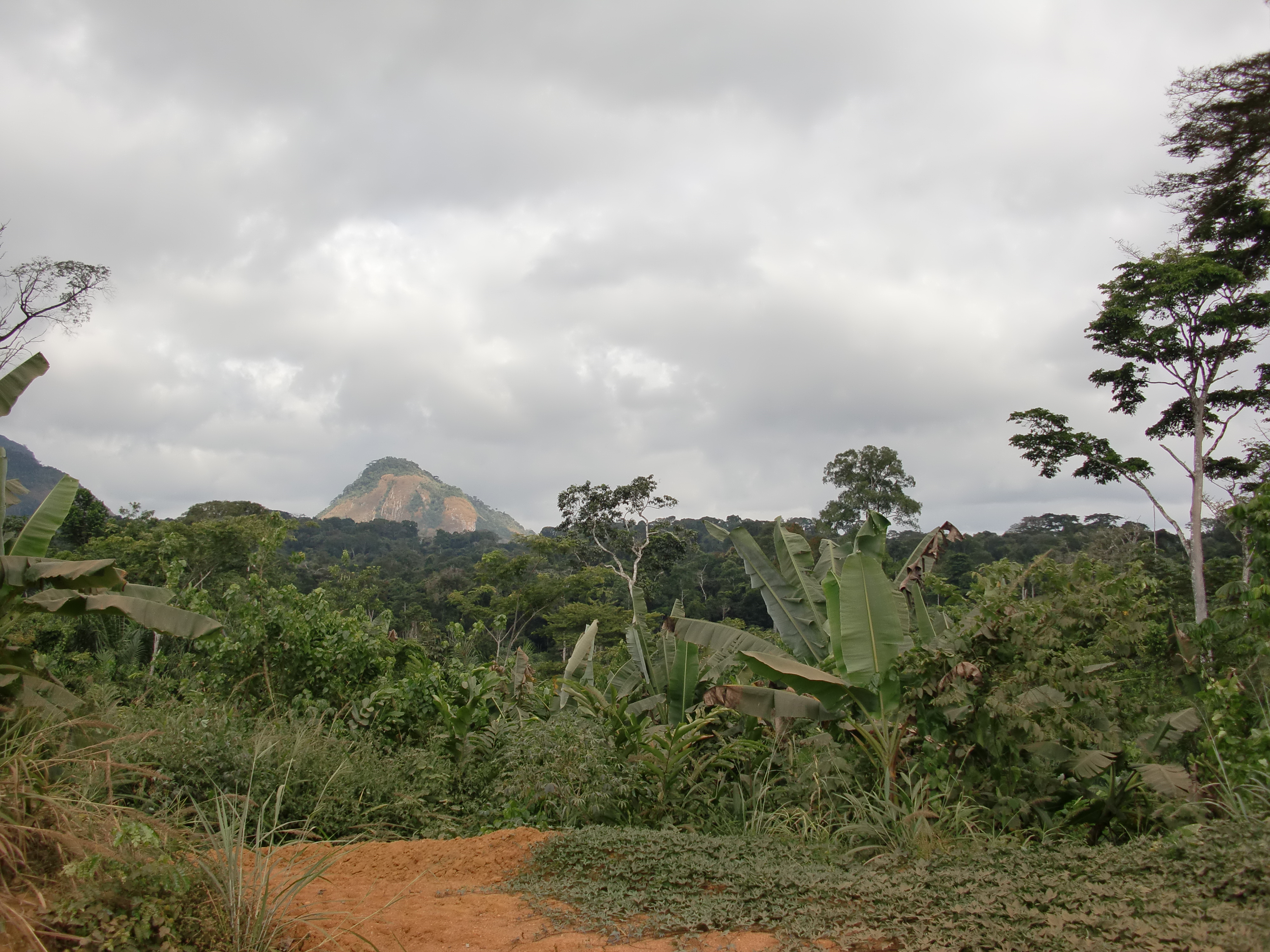
- Jungle near Oyala in Equatorial Guinea

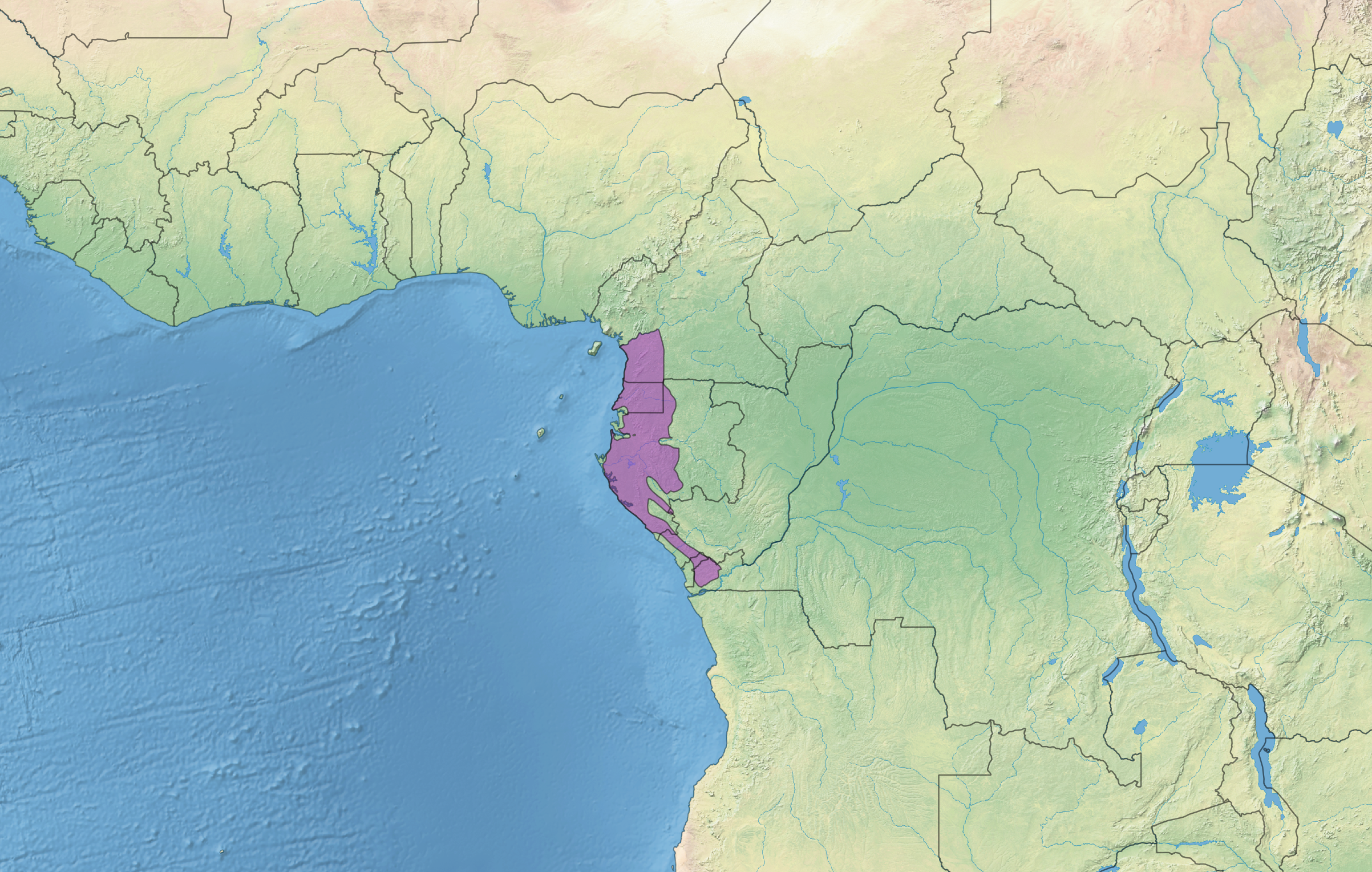
- Map of Congolian Coastal Forests Ecoregion

Ecology
- Realm: Afrotropical
- Biome: Tropical and subtropical moist broadleaf forests
- Borders: Central African mangroves; Cross–Sanaga–Bioko coastal forests; Northwestern Congolian lowland forests; Western Congolian forest–savanna mosaic

Geography
- Area: 189,700 km^{2} (73,200 mi^{2})
- Countries: List: Angola; Cameroon; Republic of the Congo; Democratic Republic of the Congo; Equatorial Guinea; Gabon
- Coordinates: 0.15°N 10.62°E

Conservation
- Conservation status: relatively stable
- Protected: 43,768 km^{2} (23)%

The Atlantic Equatorial coastal forests, also known as the Congolian coastal forests (French: Forêts côtières équatoriales atlantiques, Spanish: Bosques costeros atlánticos ecuatoriales, Portuguese: Florestas costeiras atlânticas equatoriais), are a tropical moist broadleaf forest ecoregion of Central Africa, covering hills, plains, and mountains of the Atlantic coast of Cameroon, Equatorial Guinea, Gabon, Republic of the Congo, Angola, and Democratic Republic the of Congo.

This is rich forest home to large mammals such as western gorillas, chimpanzees, forest elephants and African buffalo, as well as many small mammals, birds, amphibians, reptiles, and invertebrates. Other primates include black colobus monkeys and mandrills.

== Description ==
The Atlantic Equatorial coastal forests cover an area of 189,700 square kilometers (73,200 sq mi), extending along the Atlantic coast from low hills in the north to mountains further south and east. The forests cover Cameroon's southwest corner, mainland Equatorial Guinea (Río Muni) and the coastal plains of Gabon. A narrow strip extends southeast through Republic of the Congo and the eastern portion the Cabinda enclave of Angola to just north of the Congo River in the Kongo Central province of Democratic Republic of the Congo.

The Atlantic Equatorial coastal forests form the southernmost part of the Lower Guinean forests complex, a region of coastal moist broadleaf forests that extend north and west into southwestern Cameroon and southern Nigeria. The Atlantic Ocean lies to the west, and pockets of the Central African mangroves can be found along the brackish river mouths and estuaries along the coast. The region extends south from the Sanaga River in Cameroon down to just north of the Congo River, with several other large rivers running through. To the east, the coastal forests transition to the Northwestern Congolian lowland forests, part of the vast Congolian rainforests complex that covers the Congo Basin. The Western Congolian forest–savanna mosaic bounds the Atlantic Equatorial coastal forests to the southeast.

This is a tropical ecoregion receiving high rainfall throughout the year.

== Flora and fauna ==
Along with the neighbouring Cross–Sanaga–Bioko coastal forests ecoregion, the area holds about 50% of the endemic plant life of tropical West Africa. Particularly important areas for plant life include the Monts de Cristal in Gabon and the Mayombe area on the borders of Republic of the Congo, Angola, and Democratic Republic of the Congo.

The area contains numerous endemic forest mammals including sun-tailed monkey, long-footed shrew, lesser Angolan epauletted fruit bat, and African smoky mouse as well as the forest elephant and gorillas, chimpanzees and other primates. The forests are also rich in bird life.

Endemic amphibians include the Apouh night frog (Astylosternus schioetzi), Perret's snout-burrower, Gabon dwarf clawed frog (Hymenochirus feae), Ogowe River frog (Phrynobatrachus ogoensis), and Andre's clawed frog.

== Conservation ==
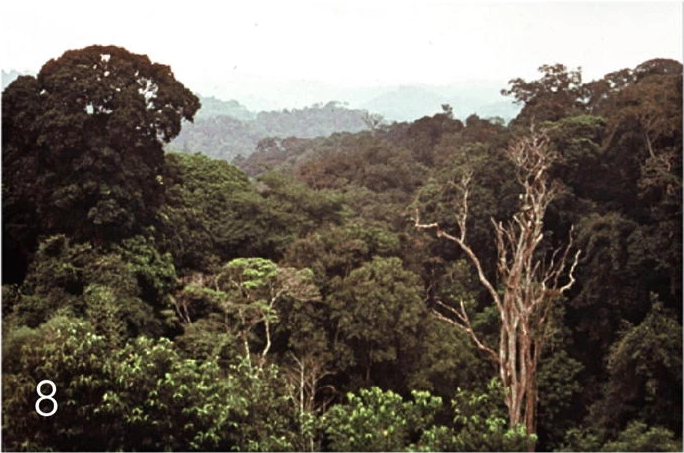
Maiombo Forest in Cabinda, Angola — Huntley (2019)

Many of the animals here, including the primates, are endangered by hunting for meat or as prizes, while elephants are poached for meat and for the ivory trade. Logging is a continuing threat in Cameroon, Gabon, the Republic of Congo and particularly in Equatorial Guinea. However extensive areas of forest remain and the fauna is still especially rich in the southern parts of Equatorial Guinea and in Gabon, which has designated large areas as national parkland, including Loango National Park in this ecoregion.

A 2017 assessment found that 43,768 km^{2}, or 23%, of the ecoregion is in protected areas. Protected areas include Douala Edéa National Park and Campo Ma'an National Park in Cameroon; Monte Alen National Park and Monte Temelón Nature Reserve in Equatorial Guinea; Crystal Mountains National Park, Loango National Park, Lope National Park, Moukalaba-Doudau National Park, Waka National Park, and Wonga Wongue National Park in Gabon.

== Urban areas and settlements ==
This is a thinly-populated region. South Region (Cameroon) is heavily forested and contains the coastal resort of Kribi and the Campo Ma'an National Park. All of mainland Equatorial Guinea (Río Muni) is in this region including the port of Bata. In Gabon, as well as logging camps, the forests are inhabited by small groups of agricultural and fishing people including traditional forest dwellers such as the Bakola and Bagyeli. Gabonese towns among the coastal forests include Lambaréné, home of the Albert Schweitzer Hospital, the logging base of Ndjolé, Fougamou base for visiting the Waka National Park and Gamba, oil hub but also base for visiting Loango National Park.
