= Rubi-Tele Hunting Reserve =

Location in the Democratic Republic of the Congo

- Rubi-Tele Hunting Zone; Domaine de chasse de Rubi-Tele
- IUCN category VI (protected area with sustainable use of natural resources)
- Location within Democratic Republic of the Congo
- Coordinates: 2°28′48″N 25°19′48″E
- Area: 6,191.43 km^{2} (2,390.52 sq mi)
- Established: 1930

The Rubi-Tele Hunting Reserve is found in Democratic Republic of the Congo. It was established in 1930. It has an area of 6191.43 km^{2}.
