= Mangai Nature Reserve =

- IUCN category VI (protected area with sustainable use of natural resources)
- Interactive map of Mangai Nature Reserve
- Location: Kwilu Province, Democratic Republic of the Congo
- Area: 1,903.33 km^{2} (734.88 sq mi)
- Designation: Nature reserve

Mangai Nature Reserve is a protected area in the Democratic Republic of the Congo. It covers 1,903.33 square kilometres (734.88 sq mi) in eastern Kwilu Province. The International Union for Conservation of Nature list the reserve as a protected area with sustainable use of natural resources (category VI).
