= Abumonbazi Nature Reserve =

Protected area in the Democratic Republic of the Congo

- Location: Nord-Ubangi, Democratic Republic of the Congo
- Area: 5,726.1 km^{2} (2,210.9 sq mi)
- Designation: Nature reserve

The Abumonbazi Nature Reserve is a protected area situated in the Democratic Republic of the Congo, with a total area of 5,726.10 km^{2}.
