= Bomu Hunting Reserve =

Protected area in the Democratic Republic of the Congo

- Domaine de Chasse Bomu
- IUCN category II (national park)
- Location: Bas-Uele, Democratic Republic of the Congo
- Area: 4,125.6 km^{2} (1,592.9 sq mi)
- Designation: Hunting area

The Bomu Hunting Reserve (French: Domaine de Chasse Bomu) is a hunting reserve (IUCN Category II) in the Democratic Republic of the Congo. The reserve covers an area of 4,125.6 km^{2}. It is bounded by the Mbomou River on the north, which forms the border with the Central African Republic. It adjoins Bili-Uere Hunting Reserve to the south.
