= Bili-Uere Hunting Reserve =

- Domaine de Chasse Bili-Uere
- IUCN category VI (protected area with sustainable use of natural resources)
- Location: Bas-Uele, Democratic Republic of the Congo
- Area: 32,748.38 km^{2} (12,644.22 sq mi)
- Designation: Hunting area
- Designated: 1974
- Governing body: Institut Congolais pour la Conservation de la Nature

Bili-Uere Hunting Reserve (French: Domaine de Chasse Bili-Uere) is a hunting reserve in the Democratic Republic of the Congo, covering 32,748.38 km^{2} (12,644.22 sq mi). It is bounded on the north by Bomu Hunting Reserve, Bomu Wildlife Reserve, and the Mbomou River, which forms the border with the Central African Republic.

Since 2005, the protected area is considered a Lion Conservation Unit together with Garamba National Park.

More than 100,000 forest elephants lived in this vast landscape in the early 1970s. Today, this area faces major problems, such as wildlife conservation, illegal mining and bushmeat hunting.
