= Gangala-na-Bodio Hunting Reserve =

Hunting reserve in the Democratic Republic of the Congo

- Domaine Chasse Gangala-na-Bodio
- IUCN category VI (protected area with sustainable use of natural resources)
- Location within Democratic Republic of the Congo
- Location: Haut-Uele, Democratic Republic of the Congo
- Coordinates: 3.4900°N 29.4700°E
- Area: 9,829.32 km^{2} (3,795.12 sq mi)
- Designation: Hunting area
- Designated: 1974

The Gangala-na-Bodio Hunting Reserve is a hunting reserve in the Democratic Republic of the Congo. The reserve was established in 1974, and covers an area of 9,829 square kilometres (3,795 sq mi). The reserve adjoins Garamba National Park.

During the study of the condition of elephants in the reserve, 1202 were counted.
