= Yangambi Biosphere Reserve =

Reserve in the Democratic Republic of Congo

- IUCN category Ia (strict nature reserve)
- Interactive map of Yangambi Biosphere Reserve
- Location: Tshopo Province, Democratic Republic of the Congo
- Nearest city: Yangambi
- Area: 2,350 km^{2} (910 sq mi)
- Designation: Biosphere reserve (national) UNESCO-MAB Biosphere Reserve (international)
- Designated: 1976 (international)

Yangambi Biosphere Reserve is a protected area in the Democratic Republic of the Congo. It is located in Tshopo province.

== Geography ==
Yangambi Biosphere Reserve lies north of the Congo River within the Congo River Basin. It is west of the city of Kisangani.

== Flora and fauna ==
Plant communities within the Yangambi Biosphere Reserve vary based on rainfall, soils, and human disturbance. They include secondary forests with Pycnanthus angolensis and Fagara macrophylla, semi-deciduous secondary rain forests, rain forests with Gilbertiodendron dewevrei, climax forests with Brachystegia laurentii and swamp forests.

The reserve is important for its biodiversity It is home to 32,000 tree species. Endangered and threatened tree species in the reserve include afrormosia (Pericopsis elata), iroko (Milicia excelsa), ilomba (Pycnanthus angolensis), and sapelli (Entandrophragma cylindricum).

It was also once home to African forest elephants (Loxodonta cyclotis), but they have now disappeared locally. In 2018, a study confirmed the presence of common chimpanzees (Pan troglodytes) in the area.

== Conservation ==
The protected area was designated in 1939, covering 235,000 hectares. Yangambi was declared a Biosphere Reserve in 1976, part of UNESCO’s Man and the Biosphere Programme (MAB).

Human activities in the reserve include agriculture, hunting, fishing, making canoes, and gold mining. The forest is used for research and experiments in forestry and forest regeneration. Illegal activities, including logging and resource extraction, also take place in the reserve, and illegal hunting has depleted much of the local wildlife.
