= Central Congolian lowland forests =

Ecoregion within the Democratic Republic of the Congo

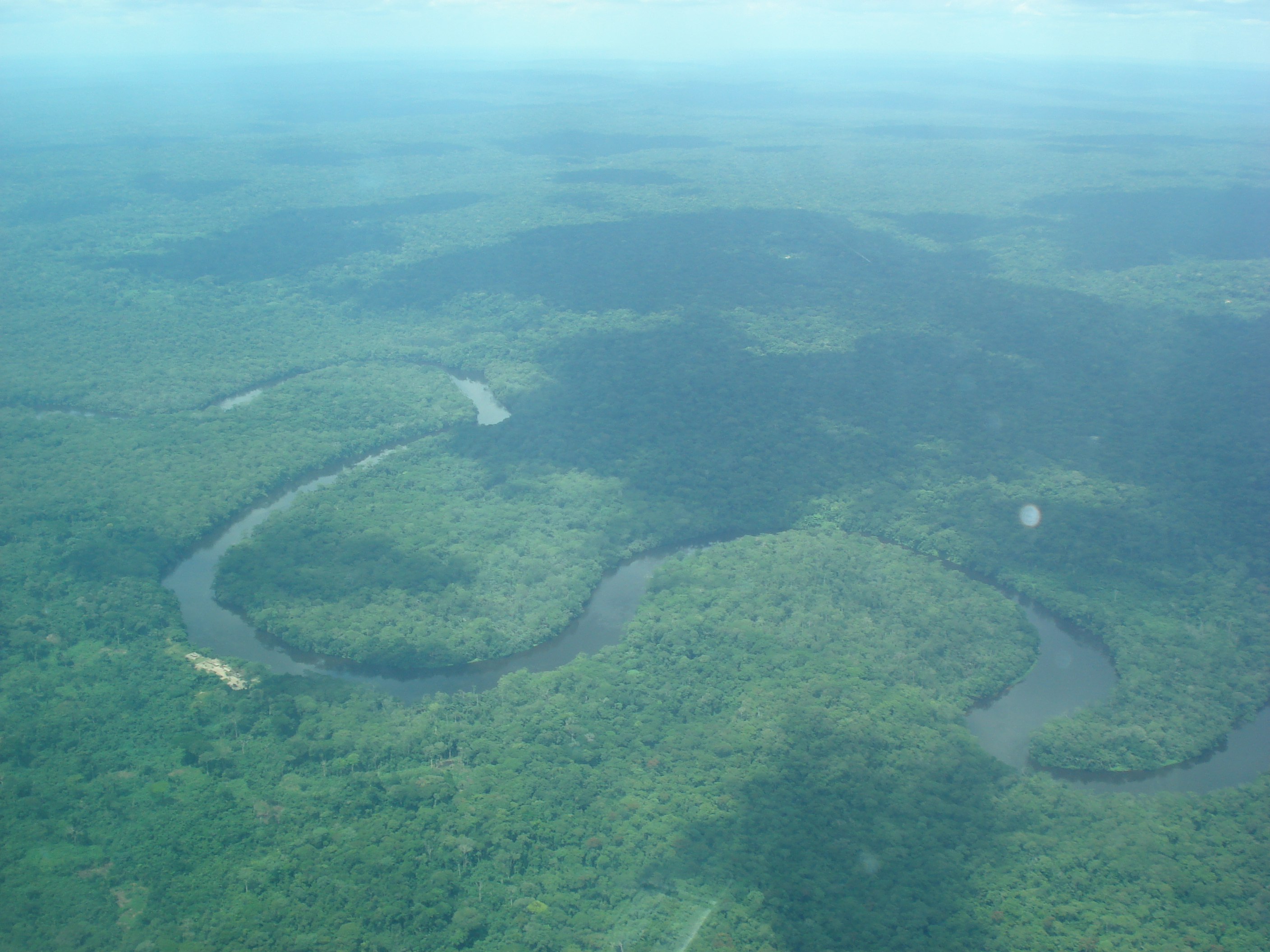
- Aerial view of the Lukenie River as it meanders through the Central Congolese lowland forests of the DRC.

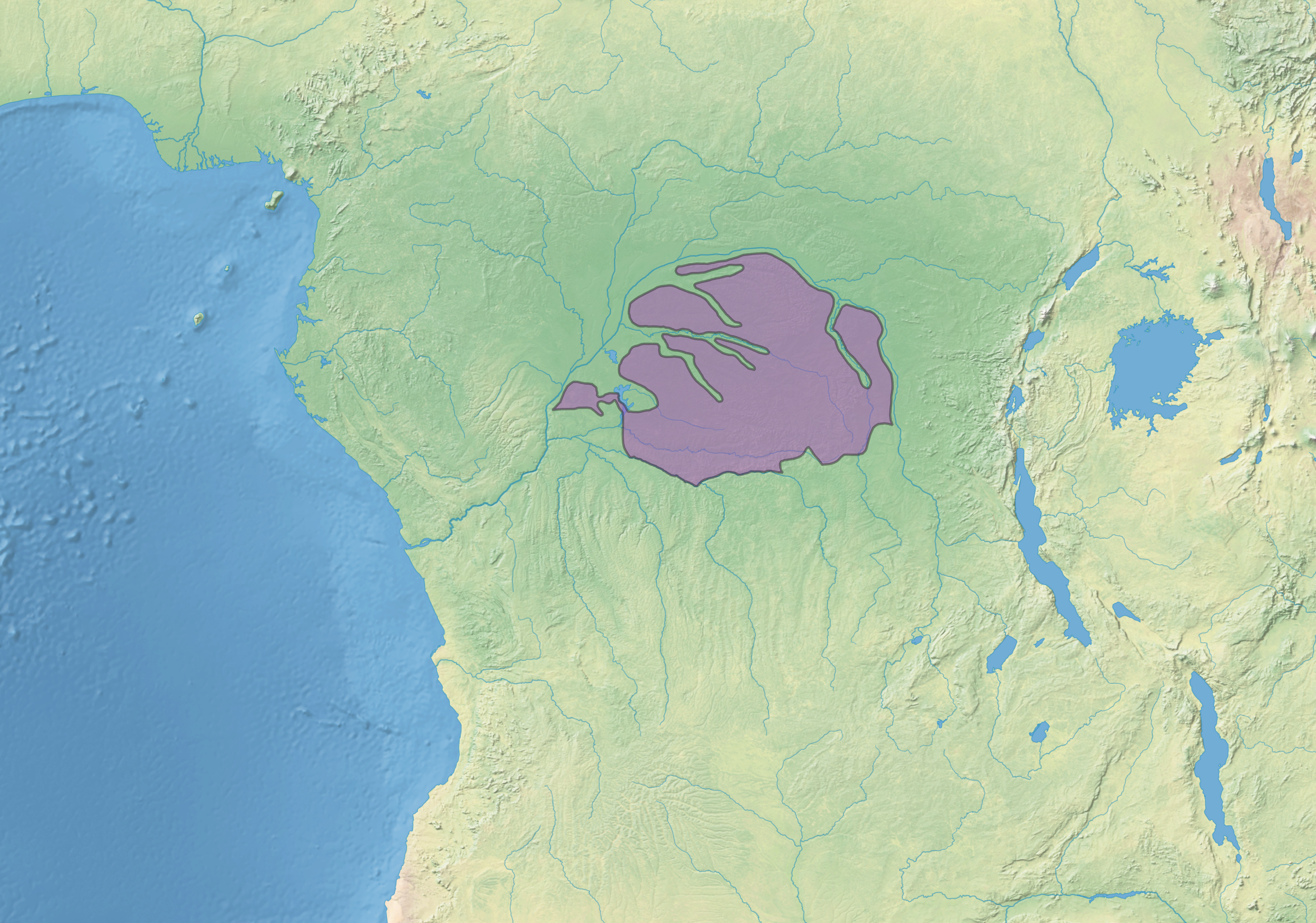
- Map of Central Congolian Lowland Forests

Ecology
- Realm: Afrotropical
- Biome: Tropical and subtropical moist broadleaf forests

Geography
- Area: 414,800 km^{2} (160,200 sq mi)
- Country: Democratic Republic of the Congo
- Coordinates: 1.5°S 22.6°E

Conservation
- Conservation status: relatively intact

The Central Congolian lowland forests (French: Forêts de plaine du centre du Congo) are an ecoregion within the Democratic Republic of the Congo. This is a remote, inaccessible area of low-lying dense wet forest, undergrowth and swamp in the Cuvette Centrale region of the Congo Basin south of the arc of the River Congo.

== Fauna ==
The region has been insufficiently researched by zoologists but is known to be home to antelopes, forest elephants, and several primates, including the rare bonobo (Pan paniscus), De Brazza's monkey, crested mangabey and the lowland gorilla. There is only one known strictly endemic mammal, the Dryas monkey (Cercopithecus dryas). Other near-endemic mammals include the golden-bellied mangabey (Cercocebus chrysogaster), okapi (Okapia johnstoni), Allen's swamp monkey (Allenopithecus nigroviridis), Angolan kusimanse (Crossarchus ansorgei), Thollon's red colobus (Procolobus tholloni) and Wolf's mona monkey (Cercopithecus wolfi).

There are two birds that are near-endemic in the region: the Congo peafowl (Afropavo congensis, VU) and the yellow-legged weaver (Malimbus flavipes).

== Threats and conservation ==
The forest remains largely unspoilt as human population is limited to small communities who hunt and fish along the many rivers that cross this remote, swampy region. However many animals are vulnerable to poaching, and their movements are restricted by the network of waterways. Meanwhile Salonga National Park is a huge protected area within the region, one of the largest national parks in the world, and the second largest tropical forest national park in the world.

== Urban areas and settlements ==
The Cuvette Centrale is remote and sparsely populated, there are some riverside markets and villages such as Ikela but access to this area is difficult (by dugout canoe) and/or expensive (there are airstrips near Salonga Park).
