= Tourism in the Democratic Republic of the Congo =

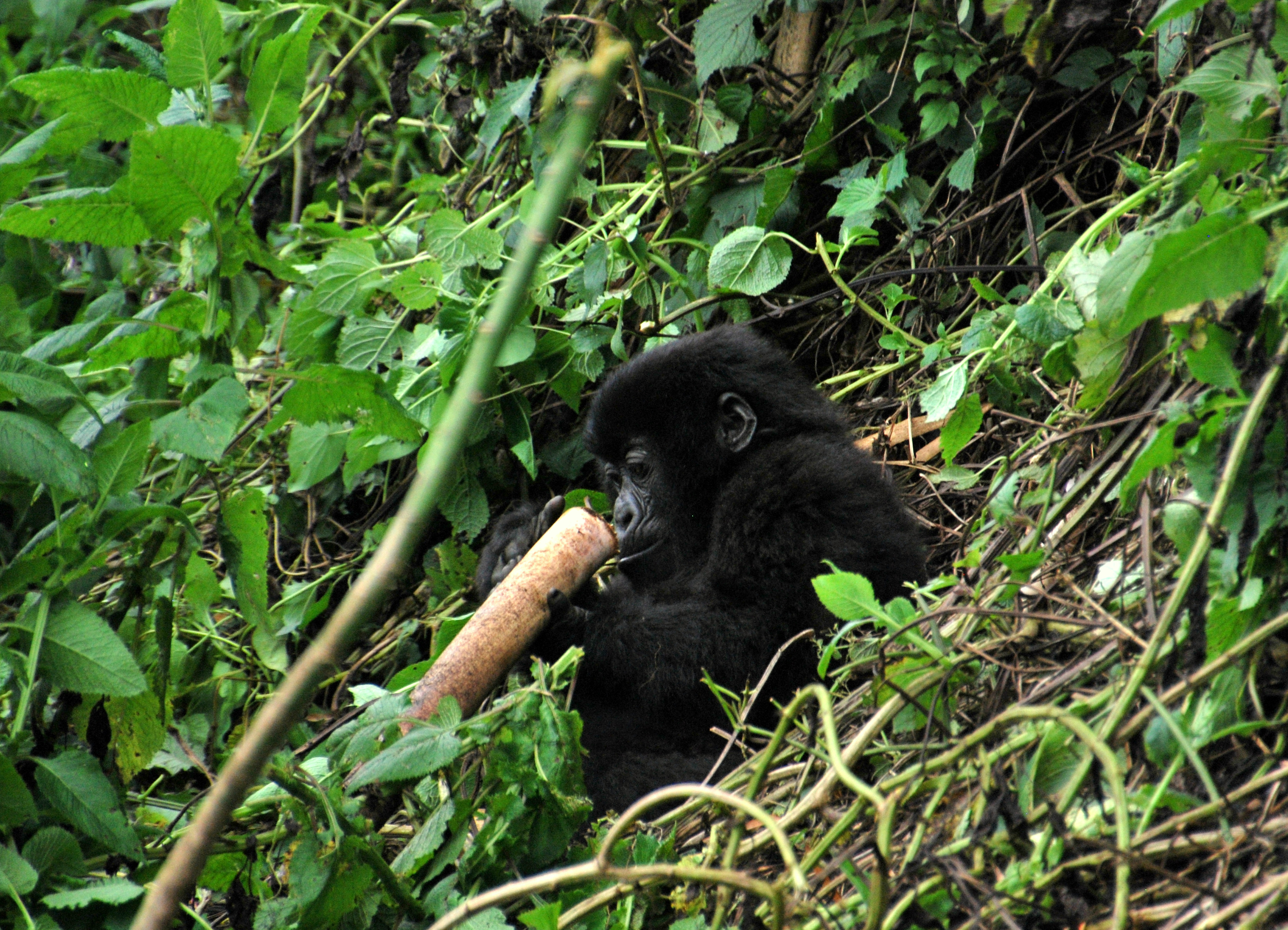
A young mountain gorilla in Volcanoes National Park. DRC's wildlife is a tourist attraction

Tourism in the Democratic Republic of the Congo is a growing industry that is becoming a significant part of the Congolese economy. The country has a wide range of tourist attractions throughout its provinces, including wildlife and dense vegetation; numerous national parks, nature reserves, and hunting zones; a wide variety of natural landscapes such as waterfalls, lakes, islands, and mountains; as well as many constructed and cultural sites like monuments, religious structures, museums, and art markets. The country is home to seven national parks and 57 reserves and hunting areas. Among these, Virunga National Park, Kahuzi-Biéga National Park, Garamba National Park, and Salonga National Park are recognized as UNESCO World Heritage Sites. Protected areas overseen by the Institut Congolais pour la Conservation de la Nature (ICCN) span 25 million hectares, accounting for 10.47% of the country's territory and 17.24% of its total forest area.

== Tourist flow ==
Tourist arrivals reached 186,652 in 2011 and 167,220 in 2012, while the average annual number of visitors between 2000 and 2012 stood at 72,441. The average hotel occupancy rate is estimated at 56%, with tourists staying for an average duration of 7 days. On average, each visitor spends around $400, and the country's total hotel capacity is approximately 27,973 rooms.

== Protected areas ==
List of protected areas:

No.	Protected areas
National Parks	
1	Garamba National Park
2	Kahuzi-Biéga National Park
3	Kundelungu National Park
4	Maiko National Park
5	Salonga National Park
6	Virunga National Park
7	Upemba National Park
Hunting areas and reserves	
8	Mangai Hunting Area and Reserve (Domaine de chasse et réserve de Mangai)
9	Bili-Uere Hunting Reserve
10	Bombo-Lumene Hunting Reserve (Domaine de chasse de Bombo Lumene; DCBL))
11	Bushimaie Hunting Area and Reserve (Domaine de chasse et réserve de Bushimaie)
12	Basse Kando Hunting Area and Reserve (Domaine de chasse et réserve de Basse Kando)
Other protected areas	
13	Itombwe Natural Reserve
14	Lomako Fauna Reserve (Réserve de faune de Lomako; RFL)
15	Mangrove Marine Park (Parc marin des Mangroves; PMM)
16	Mount Hoyo Strict Nature Reserve (Réserve intégrale du Mont Hoyo)
17	Nsele Valley Park
18	Okapi Wildlife Reserve (Réserve de faune d'Okapi; RFO)
19	Tumba-Ledima Natural Reserve (Réserve naturelle de Tumba- Ledîma; RTL)

=== Virunga National Park ===
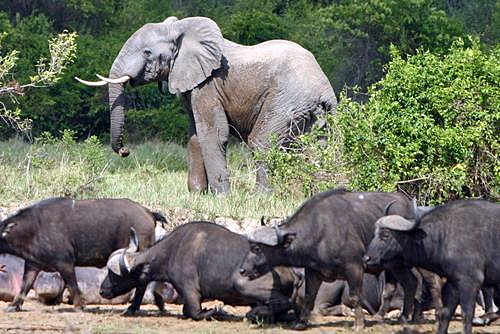
African bush elephant and African buffaloes

Created on 21 April 1925, Virunga National Park (Parc national des Virunga; PNVi), then called Albert National Park, originally encompassed the dormant volcanoes of the Virunga Massif and was established primarily to protect the mountain gorilla. In June 1960, at the independence, the Volcanoes National Park was divided into two parts, giving the Congolese portion its current size of 784,368 ha. PNVi is characterized by unique biodiversity across a wide variety of habitats, ranging from the glaciers of Rwenzori Mountains to grassy savannas, from Rwindi through the vast humid forest of the middle Semliki, montane forests, the dry Tongo forests, and a variety of aquatic habitats (high-altitude marshes, lakes, swamps, hot springs), as well as lava fields of active volcanoes. The park contains 218 mammal species, 21 of which are endemic to the Albertine Rift. In general, although it hosts species such as the lion, buffalo, and elephant, PNVi is relatively low in savanna megafauna diversity. However, their abundance under normal conditions is unmatched. The main reason for this high biomass was the presence of the world's largest population of hippopotamuses, though this population has been severely reduced in recent years during the Kivu conflict. One carnivore species, the African wild dog, is believed to have disappeared in the 1950s. The park is home to 22 primate species.

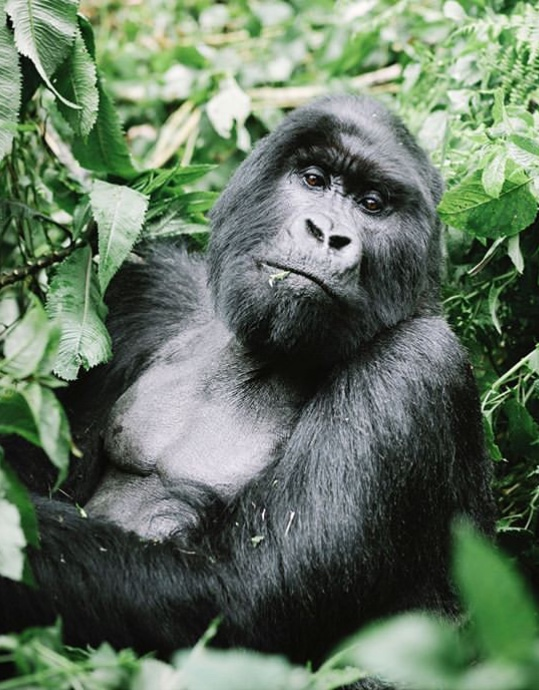
A 26 year old mountain gorilla

PNVi is also the only park in the world to host three taxa of great apes: the mountain gorilla, eastern lowland gorilla, and the eastern chimpanzee. The park also supports several ungulate species and a significant number of bird species. Reptiles and amphibians show particularly high endemism, with 119 reptile species (11 endemic) and 78 amphibian species (21 endemic). Among reptiles, turtles are poorly represented. PNVi has a high floristic richness due to its wide diversity of biotopes and natural habitats, as well as its phytogeographical position at the confluence of three regions: the Guineo-Congolian, Afro-montane, and Central African Lakes regions. Among flowering plants alone, 2,077 species have been recorded, including at least 230 endemic species. This high species diversity is accompanied by a high rate of endemism. For example, of 584 species recorded in the Rwenzori Mountains, 75 are found only in this massif, representing a high endemism rate of 13%.

=== Garamba National Park ===
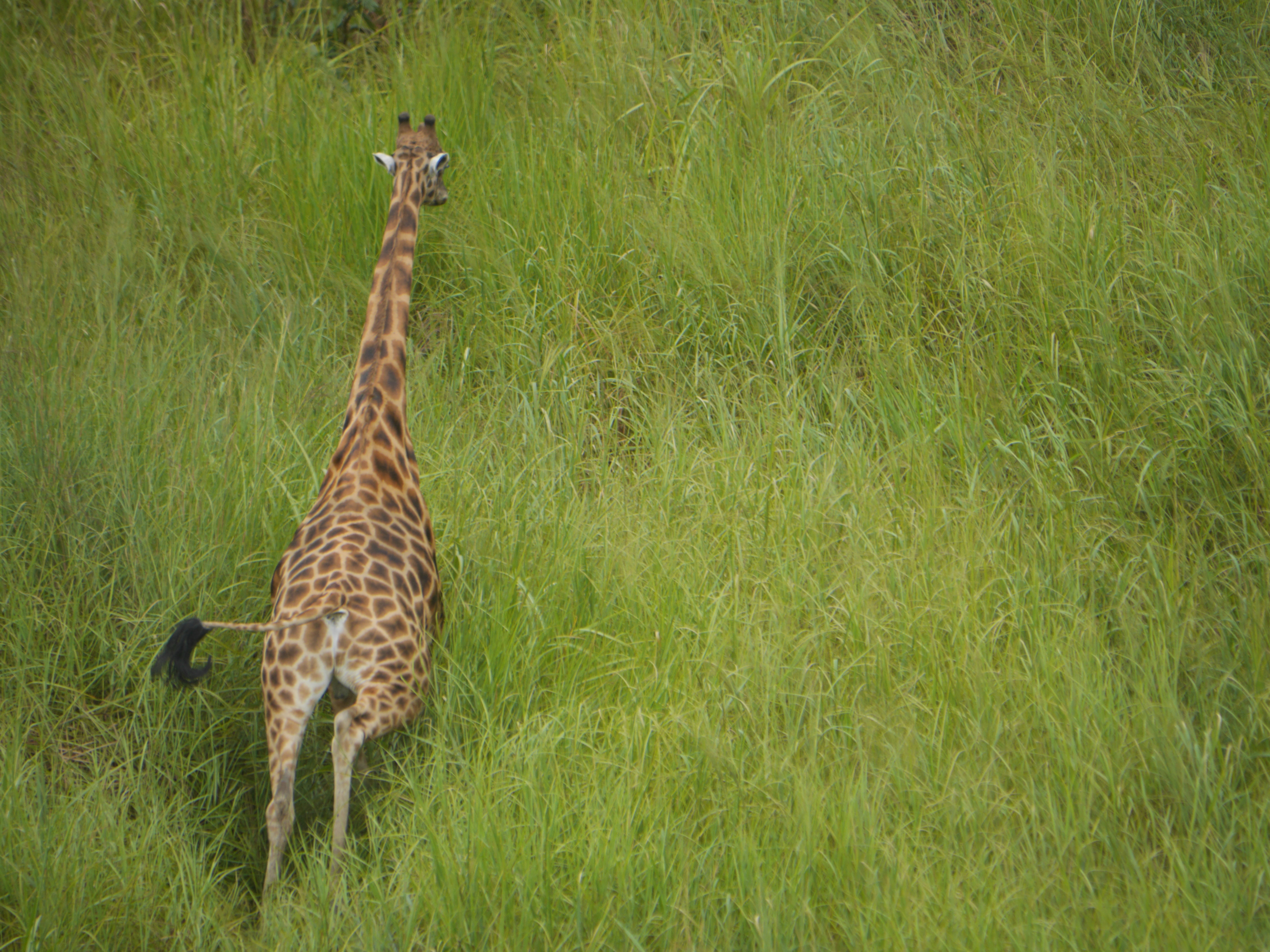
Kordofan giraffe in the Garamba National Park

Located in Haut-Uélé, Garamba National Park (Parc national de Garamba; PNG) was established by royal decree on 17 March 1938. It is surrounded by three hunting domains forming a larger block of 12,500 square kilometers. Its northern boundary coincides with the border with South Sudan, where it is contiguous with the Lantoto National Park. The PNG is rich and diverse in terms of mammalian fauna, represented by primates, scaly anteaters, carnivores, artiodactyls, and the aardvark, among others. The number of small mammals (rodents, bats, insectivores) is very high. The total number of mammal species is estimated at 130. The most notable subspecies are the okapi (possibly the last subspecies still present in the country) and the elephant. The northern white rhinoceros is now extinct; its population was estimated at four individuals in 2007. The PNG is also home to a rich bird fauna.

=== Kahuzi-Biéga National Park ===
The first protected area created in South Kivu in 1937 was the Kahuzi-Biéga National Park (Parc national de Kahuzi Biéga; PNKB), covering an area of 75,000 ha. On 30 November 1970, the strict reserve was designated as a national park by Ordinance No. 70/316, which reduced its area to 60,000 ha. Measures were again taken to relocate populations that had effectively found themselves within the park's boundaries, and in 1975, to connect high-altitude gorilla populations with those in the lowland forest, which was not yet part of the park, the PNKB area was expanded to 600,000 ha by Ordinance No. 75/238 of 22 July 1975. This extension was carried out without prior consultation with the affected populations.

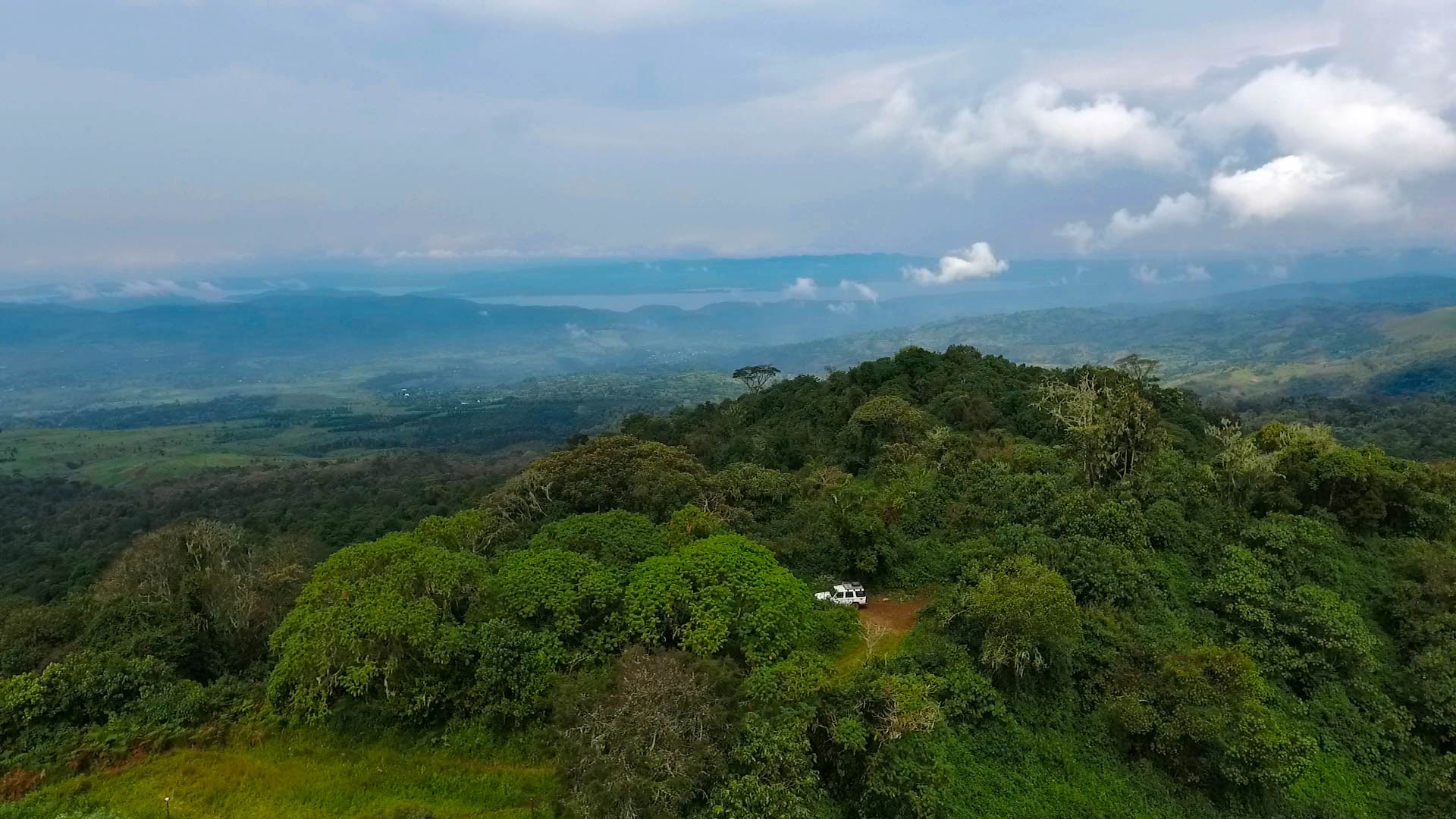
Ariel view of Kahuzi-Biéga National Park

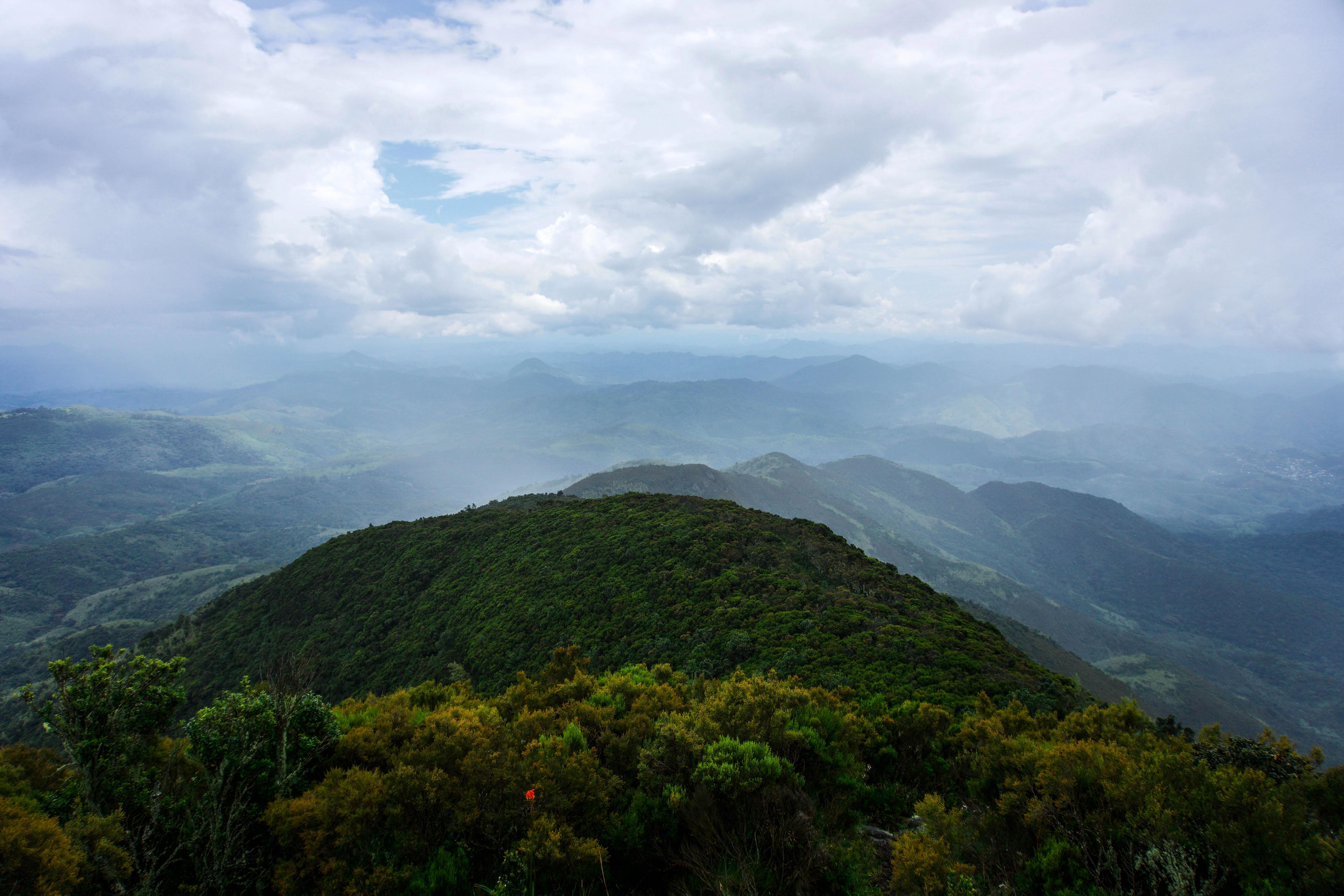
Mount Kahuzi

The PNKB is thus composed of two distinct parts:

- the high-altitude zone, which includes the former reserve area and an afro-montane rainforest center of endemism, whose highest point is Mount Kahuzi (3,308 m);
- the low-altitude zone, consisting of Guineo-Congolian rainforest, with elevations ranging from 700 m to 1,700 m.

These two parts are connected by a narrow ecological corridor. The PNKB is the second most important site in the region for endemic species and in terms of species richness. The park contains 136 mammal species. It is home to 11 species of diurnal primates and three nocturnal species, including eastern lowland gorilla and the chimpanzee, as well as several endemic primate subspecies. Other endemic and extremely rare species from eastern DRC forests are also present, such as the giant genet and the aquatic genet. Mammals characteristic of Central African forests also inhabit the park, including the forest elephant, forest buffalo, giant forest hog, bongo, and eight species of small ungulates, including six duikers.

The reserve lies within an important Endemic Bird Area, with 349 bird species identified, including 32 endemic species. The PNKB is also located within a center of plant endemism: 1,178 species have been recorded in the high-altitude zone.

The PNKB is one of the rare sites in sub-Saharan Africa where a full transition of flora and fauna from low to high altitude exists. The park includes all stages of forest vegetation from 600 m to over 2,600 m: dense humid forests of low and mid-altitudes, submontane and montane forests, and bamboo forests dominated by Sinarundinaria alpina. Above 2,600 m, up to the summits of Mounts Kahuzi and Biéga, subalpine heath vegetation has developed, hosting the endemic species Senecio kahuzicus. The park also contains rare vegetation types such as high-altitude marshes and peat bogs, as well as swamp and riparian forests on hydromorphic soils at all elevations.

=== Kundelungu National Park ===
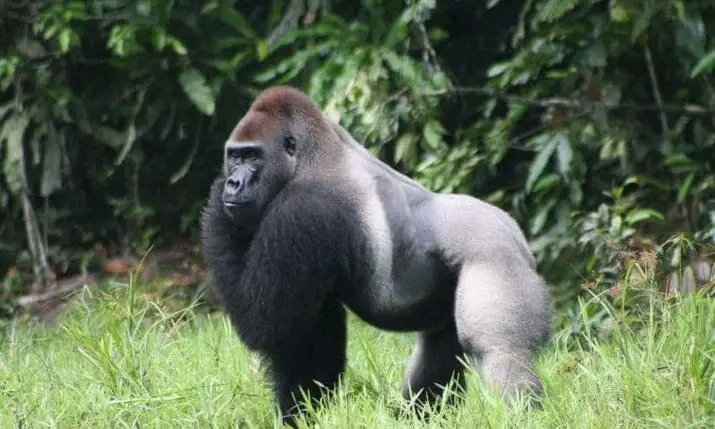
A silverback gorilla standing in the greenery of Kundelungu National Park.

Kundelungu National Park (Le Parc National des Kundelungu; PNKL) was established by Ordinance Law No. 70-317 on 30 November 1970, and later amended by Ordinance No. 75-097 on 1 March 1975, which increased its area from 120,000 hectares to 760,000 hectares, comprising 220,000 hectares of Strict Nature Reserve (Réserve Naturelle Intégrale, entirely on the plateau) and 540,000 hectares of an annexed zone. In addition to the annexed zone, the PNKL manages the Tshangalele Partial Reserve (Réserve partielle de Tshangalele), created by Decree No. 52/72 on 28 July 1955, for the protection of birds, specifically the white-backed duck. The PNKL is located north of the city of Lubumbashi, 180 km along the Kasenga road (according to Ordinance No. 70-317 of 30 November 1970).

The PNKL is home to at least 33 animal species, including the black antelope, harnessed guib, greater kudu, cheetah, bushpig, common warthog, oribi, hippopotamus, buffalo, and others. The zebra appears to have disappeared from this protected area. The park's habitats are mainly composed of open forests, grassy savannas, wooded savannas, and forest galleries, which remain largely intact.

=== Maïko National Park ===
Maïko National Park (Parc National de la Maiko; PNM) was established in 1970 by Ordinance No. 70-312 of 20 November 1970. It covers an area of 1,083,000 hectares and spans three provinces: the former Orientale Province (45%), Maniema Province (40%), and North Kivu Province (15%). The wildlife is very rich and diverse, with at least 31 mammal species, including elephants, buffalos, chimpanzees, duikers, and other primates, as well as endemic species such as the eastern lowland gorilla. The avifauna is also rich and diverse, and the Congolese peafowl is present in the park. The most common vegetation formations include mixed primary forests, Gilbertiodendron dewevrei-dominated forests, Uapaca guineensis-dominated forests, montane forests, and secondary forests.

=== Salonga National Park ===
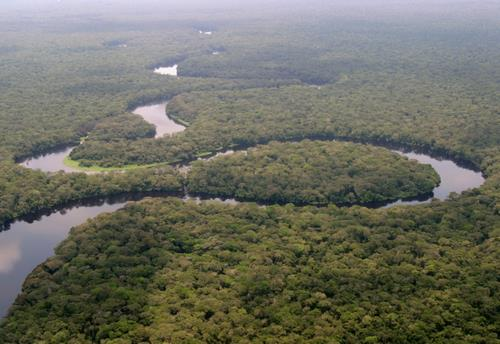
View of a river in the Salonga National Park

Covering an area of 3,600,000 ha, Salonga National Park (Parc national de la Salonga; PNS) is located in the heart of the central basin of the Congo River. It was formally established by Ordinance Law No. 70-318 on 30 November 1970. The PNS encompasses vast forest blocks representative of the lowland Guineo-Congolian rainforest. The forest is interspersed with marshy clearings rich in mineral salts, which provide very important habitats for wildlife, particularly elephants. The mixed terra firma forest is generally untouched by exploitation or clearing, although small patches of degraded forest are visible in areas of former relocated villages. Secondary forests and forest fallows are found along roads and in inhabited areas. PNS was created in the mid-20th century to protect its forest elephant population, which was considered impressive in the 1950s but is now severely threatened by poaching. In 2004, the population was estimated at 1,200. The park is also home to the bonobo, an endemic species of the central Congo basin forest ecoregion. Its population is estimated at around 14,000, but data on population size and distribution remain limited and should be interpreted with caution. Eight other species of diurnal primates are also present, including the swamp monkey in riparian forests.

The park hosts nine carnivore species, including the leopard and the white-cheeked otter, and nine antelope species, including the bongo, the aquatic duiker, and five duiker species. Other notable mammals include the hippopotamus, which is difficult to observe except along the Lomela River (its presence was reported in 2006 along the Salonga), forest buffalo, and giant pangolin. Many villages located within the future park boundaries were relocated along roads, in the corridor separating the two blocks and along the Ekombé–Mundja axis west of the southern block. Exceptions are two groups that reside partially or entirely within the park boundaries:

- The Kitawalists, part of whom moved into the park in 1970. They are located in the northeastern part of the northern block, south of the Lomela River. The Kitawalists do not recognize the authority of the state, and therefore do not recognize the existence of the park. They practice agriculture and hunting.
- The Lyaelima, who are not present outside the park. Estimated at around 2,500 individuals, they occupy eight villages along the Anga–Mundja trail in the southern block. They live on their ancestral lands and did not accept leaving the park when it was created.

=== Upemba National Park ===
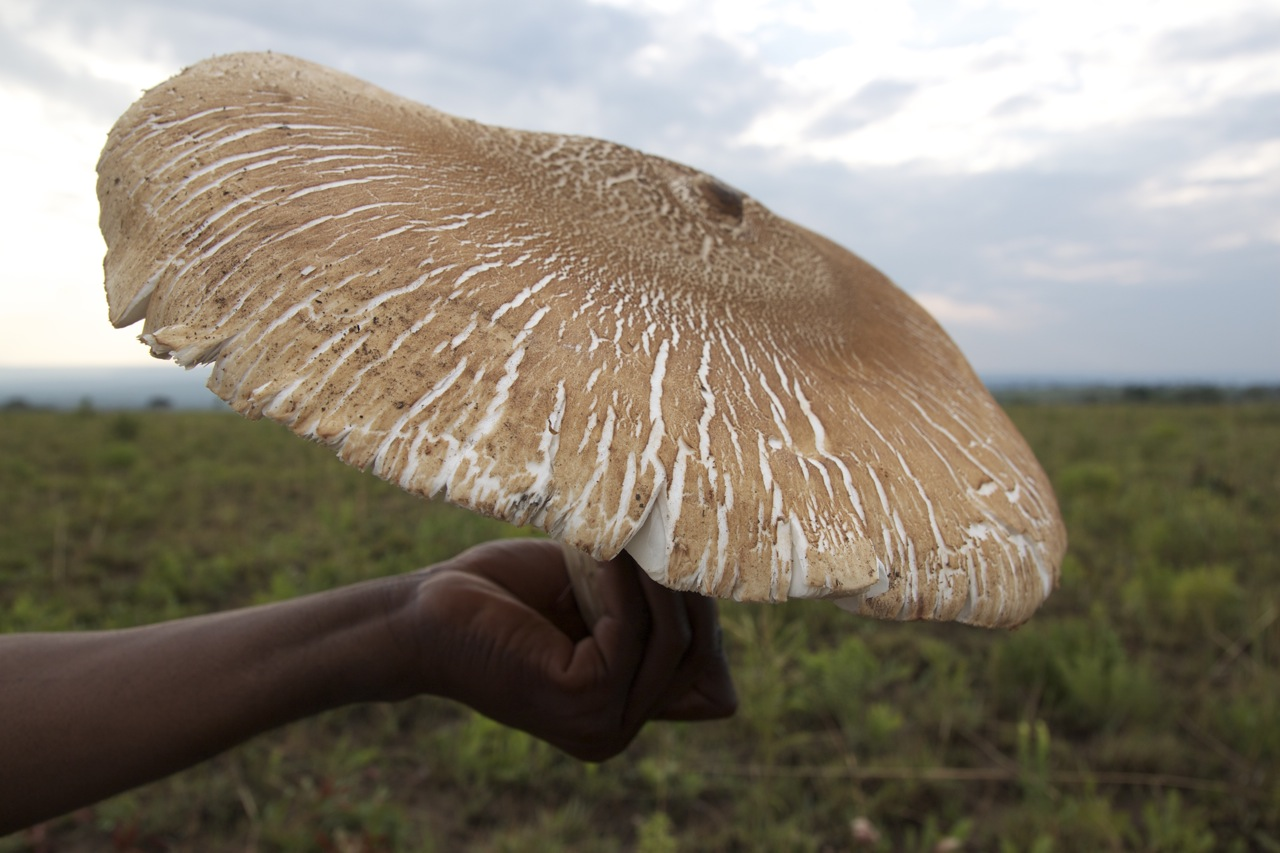
A Termitomyces titanicus found in a village outside Upemba National Park

Upemba National Park (Parc National de l'Upemba; PNU) was established by royal decree on 15 May 1939, covering an area of 1,773,000 hectares. Its boundaries were modified several times following land claims and were finally fixed in their current configuration by Ordinance Law 75-241 of 22 July 1975.

The PNU includes a strict nature reserve of 10,000 square kilometers and an annexed zone of approximately 3,000 square kilometers. Together with the Lubudi–Sampwe Reserved Hunting Domain and the Kundelungu annex zone, it formed an ecological corridor that facilitated significant elephant migrations. The PNU consists of extensive regions of grassy and swampy savannas, high plateaus, and scattered forest galleries that develop along the banks of numerous waterways. Around these grassy savannas is a first belt of shrub vegetation, followed by wooded savanna. It is rich in wildlife, with at least 37 mammal species observed in the northern and southern parts of the park. These include elephants (a herd of about 700 individuals was observed in June 2005 in the annexed zone and the Lufira Valley), buffalo, zebra, duikers, hippopotamus, lion, Cape eland, lechwe cob, sitatunga, and others. Due to poaching pressure, wildlife is now concentrated only in certain areas of the park.

== See also ==
- Economy of the Democratic Republic of the Congo
