= Institut Congolais pour la Conservation de la Nature =

Congolese governmental partner for natural conservation

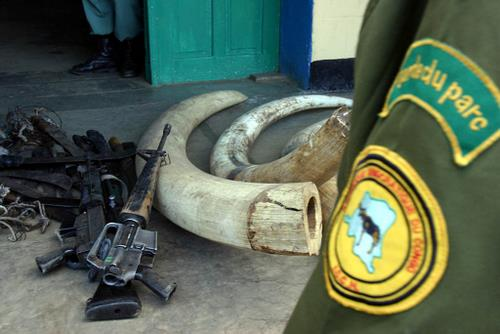

Agency overview
- Formed: 1929; 97 years ago
- Jurisdiction: Government of the Democratic Republic of the Congo
- Headquarters: Gombe, Kinshasa

The Institut Congolais pour la Conservation de la Nature (ICCN), meaning "Congolese Institute for Nature Conservation", is the institution responsible for managing protected areas in the Democratic Republic of the Congo. Its mandate is established by Ordinance-Law No. 75-023 of 22 July 1975, as revised by Law No. 78-190 of 5 May 1978. Headquartered in Gombe, Kinshasa, the ICCN operates as a public institution with a technical and scientific mandate, working under a paramilitary structure while having legal personality and administrative independence. Its organization is governed by Law No. 08/099 of 7 July 2008 and Decree No. 09/012 of 24 April 2009, and it operates under the authority of the Ministry of Environment, Sustainable Development, and the New Climate Economy (Ministère de l'Environnement, Développement durable et de la Nouvelle économie du climat; MEDD-NEC), as well as the Ministry of Tourism.

The ICCN's primary mission is to guarantee the coordinated and effective management of protected areas to preserve biodiversity in the DRC. Key responsibilities include the conservation and management of ecosystems and biodiversity within protected areas such as national parks, nature reserves, and hunting domains; the promotion of biodiversity through scientific research and tourism in strict compliance with conservation principles; and the management of wildlife breeding and capture facilities located within and outside protected areas. The ICCN works with various national and international NGO partners.

== History ==
=== Early conservation effort and Commission of Albert National Park ===
From the very outset of the Congo Free State in 1885, King Leopold II recognized that the preservation of nature was important to the sustainable development of a tropical colony, and the early colonial policy quickly reflected this awareness. The first measures appeared in 1887, when restrictions were introduced on the cutting of trees, followed in 1888 by regulations governing hunting practices and the prohibition of hunting in Boma. By 25 July 1889, the administration had gone further by establishing designated hunting reserves to prevent the large-scale destruction of elephant populations.

After the Convention for the Preservation of Wild Animals, Birds and Fish in Africa in 1900, a decree issued on 29 April 1901 introduced a structured framework for wildlife protection, which classified vertebrate species into five categories based on their level of protection. This legislation also led to the creation of some of the earliest large-scale reserves, including territories across the Aruwimi basin and parts of the former Katanga Province. These regulations were later expanded by the royal decree of 29 July 1910 and further refined in 1937 with comprehensive laws governing hunting and fishing across the Belgian Congo and Ruanda-Urundi. Forest conservation simultaneously became an increasing priority for colonial administrations, beginning in 1893, when wildfire were prohibited in areas considered suitable for natural forest regeneration, and by 1903, officials were warning against the dangers of uncontrolled and irrational deforestation. The first formal forest reserves were established in 1910, which covered approximately 600,000 hectares around key administrative posts such as Loto, Lodja, Dekese, Belo, and Nepoko. Over time, this network expanded significantly to preserve timber resources and maintain the natural landscape.

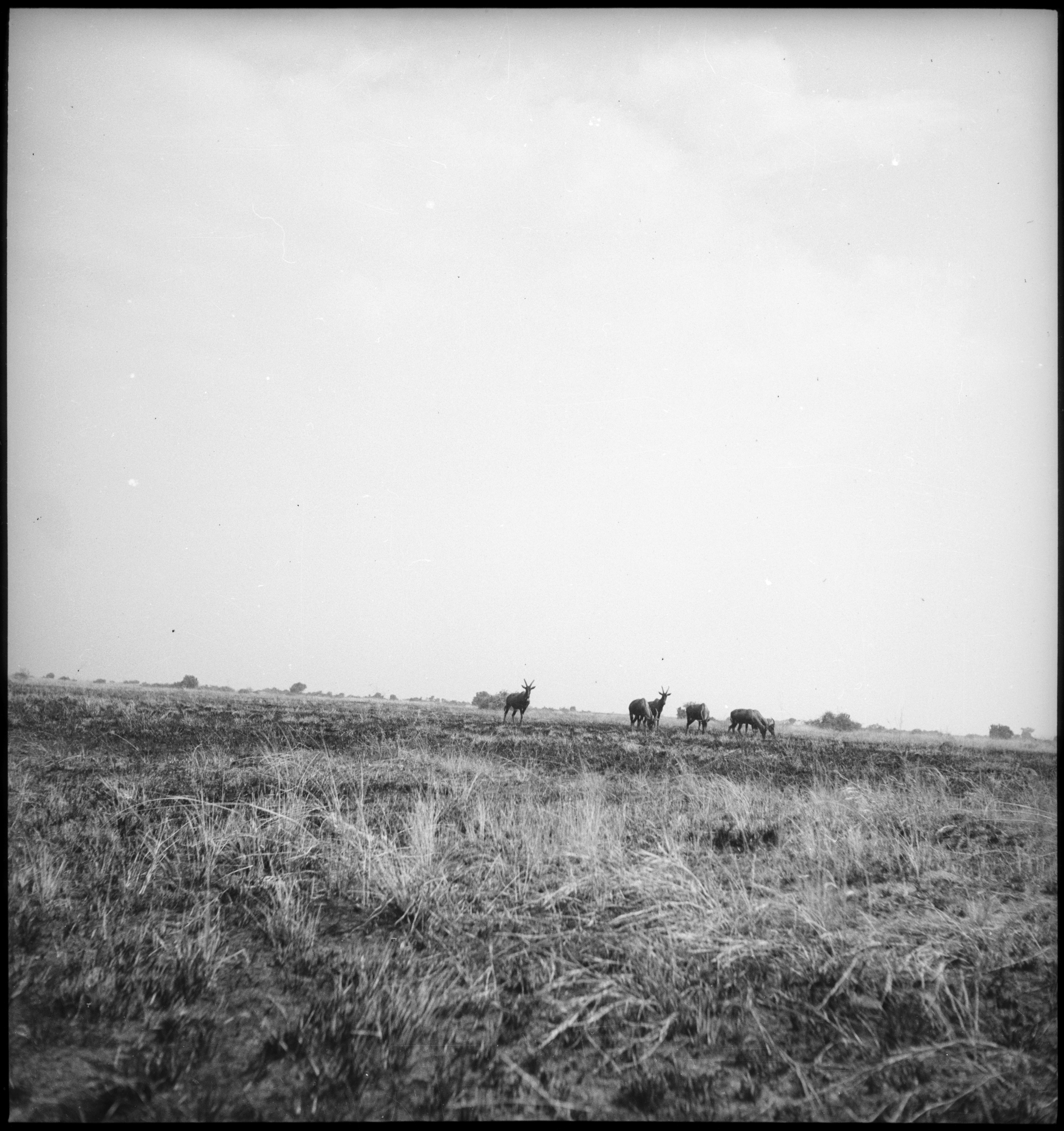
An early 1940s image of Virunga National Park

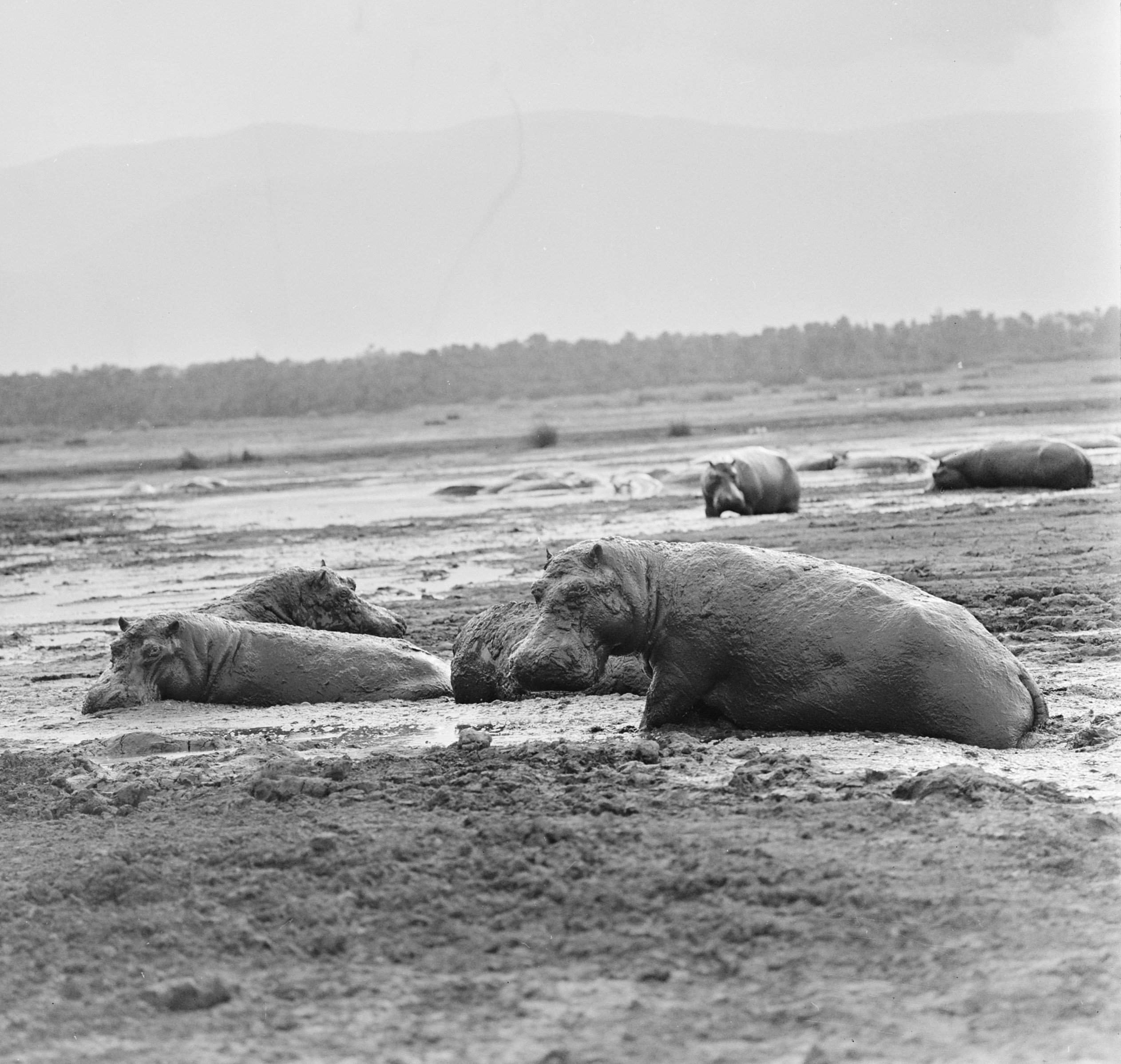
Several hippopotamuses rest in the mud along a riverbank. Photograph by Rob Mieremet on 16 August 1973 during Prince Bernhard of Lippe-Biesterfeld's visit to Virunga National Park

In 1919, during a visit to the United States, King Albert I toured several national parks and was inspired by their model. He subsequently expressed his desire to establish similar protected areas in the Belgian Congo, and this vision materialized on 21 April 1925 with the creation of Albert National Park (today known as Virunga National Park) in North Kivu. Initially covering around 20,000 hectares, the park included Mount Mikeno, part of Mount Visoke, and a portion of Mount Karisimbi, and administration was entrusted to the Governor General of the Colony. Its primary purpose was to protect mountain gorillas and their forest habitat. The park was structured into zones: a strictly protected core reserved for scientific research and conservation, and surrounding annex areas that served as buffer zones. Its design was initially influenced by American naturalist Carl Akeley and later expanded by the zoologist Jean-Marie Derscheid, while administrative oversight remained centered in Brussels. In June 1929, the park's boundaries were significantly enlarged to encompass the entire Virunga volcanic region and the plains of Lake Edward, which increased its area to approximately 350,000 hectares. At the same time, a new administrative body, the Commission of Albert National Park (Commission du Parc National Albert), was established to oversee its management, and a portion of its members were drawn from international scientific institutions.

=== Institute of National Parks of the Belgian Congo and expansion of conservation systems ===
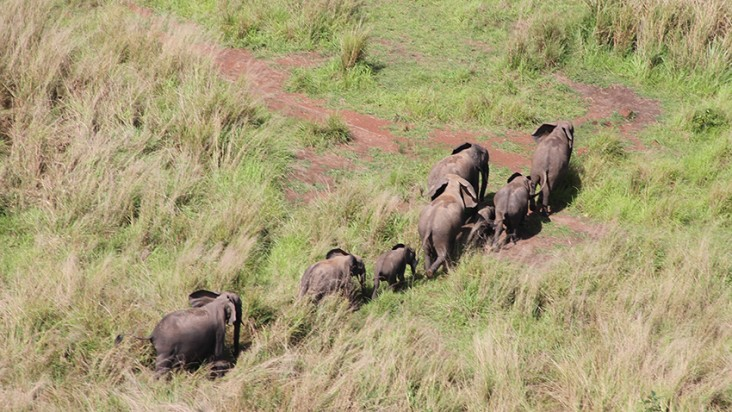
Elephants in the Garamba National Park

By the 1930s, it had become evident that a single national park could not adequately protect the ecological diversity of the Belgian Congo and Ruanda-Urundi, and this prompted a new phase of expansion and institutional development in conservation policy. A royal decree of 4 April 1934 established regulations for the exploitation of state forests, which formed the foundation of a colonial forestry code. Later that same year, on 26 November 1934, the Commission of Albert National Park was reorganized and expanded into the Institute of National Parks of the Belgian Congo (Institut des Parcs Nationaux du Congo Belge; IPNCB). Officially inaugurated in Brussels on 8 March 1935 in the presence of King Leopold III, the IPNCB was tasked to protect flora and fauna, promote scientific research, and encourage tourism wherever possible. The 1934 reforms also extended the boundaries of Albert National Park northward to the Rwenzori Mountains and led to the creation of a second protected area, Akagera National Park, developed from an earlier hunting reserve in northeastern Ruanda. Subsequent expansion followed rapidly, with the establishment of Garamba National Park on 17 March 1938 in Haut-Uélé, building on the former Aka-Dungu reserve, and on 15 May 1939, Upemba National Park was created in the Lualaba from an existing zoological and forest reserve.

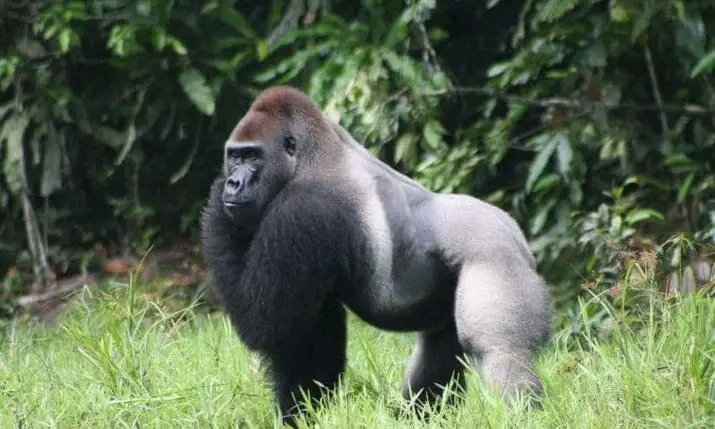
A silverback gorilla standing in the Kundelungu National Park.

Belgium also positioned itself within the international conservation movement, as it participated in major global congresses on nature protection, including those held in Paris in 1923 and 1931, and played a role in the London Convention of 8 November 1933 on the protection of African fauna and flora, which it ratified in 1935. These engagements reinforced the scientific and international orientation of colonial conservation policy, as territories managed by the Institute were placed under a regime of absolute protection for scientific purposes in accordance with the Convention's classification system.

By the 1940s, a vast network of protected areas had been established across the Belgian Congo and Ruanda-Urundi, which included not only national parks but also forest reserves, hunting reserves, and fishing reserves. The national parks themselves were designated as strictly protected natural reserves, primarily intended for scientific study. Limited areas within certain parks, such as Albert and Akagera, were opened to regulated tourism. On the ground, these protected areas were managed by European wardens, who were assisted by locally recruited guards responsible for daily enforcement.

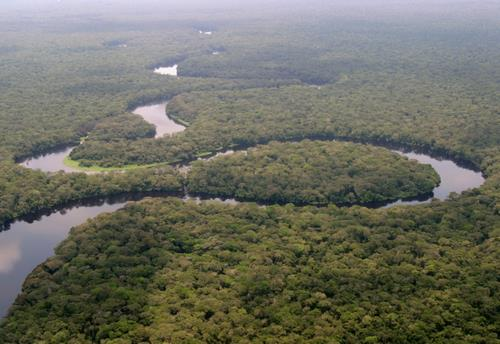
View of a river in the Salonga National Park

There were 156 officially designated forest reserves, and among these were four main integral reserves, including Mount Kahuzi in South Kivu, Idjwi Island on Lake Kivu, the "Lukule River" reserve in Beni Territory, and the "Homas Mountains" reserve in Irumu Territory. The majority, which were 146 reserves, were established for the protection of specific forest resources or populations, often for scientific or economic purposes, and together covered approximately 500,000 hectares. Six large reserves operated under special conditions in which certain provisions of the 1934 forestry decree were suspended; these areas alone extended over an estimated 20 million hectares. An ordinance issued on 12 March 1935 created a corps of indigenous forest guards to ensure the implementation of forestry policy.

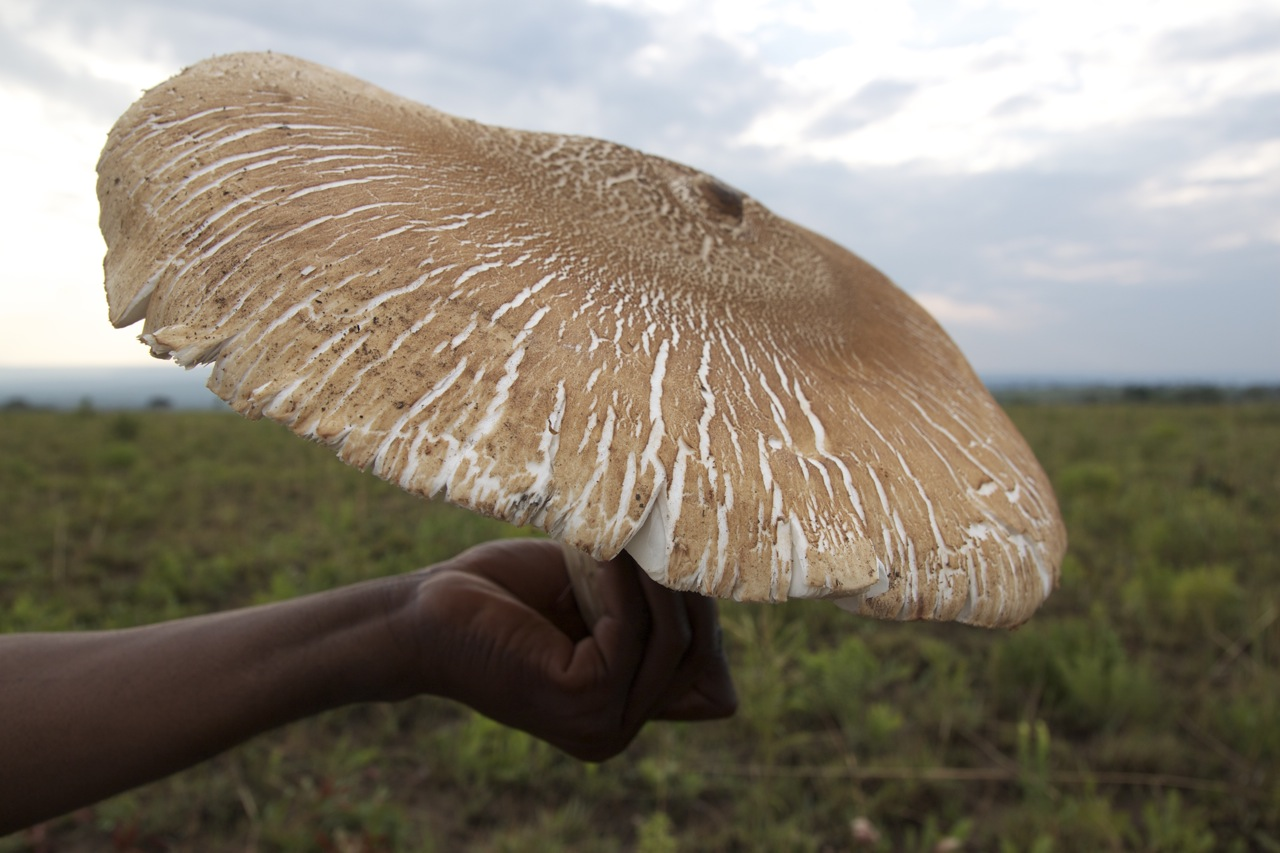
A Termitomyces titanicus found in a village outside Upemba National Park

There were 36 hunting reserves designed to provide either total or "partial protection of certain animals liable to be hunted as game". Some of these reserves were general reserves in which all hunting was prohibited, while others allowed limited hunting but protected specific species. Additional categories were created specifically for elephants and hippopotamuses. The regulation of hunting was further reinforced in 1937 with the creation of a corps of honorary hunting lieutenants, who acted as technical advisers to the colonial authorities and were tasked with ensuring compliance with hunting laws and promoting public awareness of wildlife conservation. Alongside them operated a corps of indigenous game guards.

Fishing reserves were established under the decree of 21 April 1937, which governed hunting and fishing activities across the colony, and aimed to conserve fish populations, particularly with a view to their sustainable exploitation.

=== Post-independence ===
After the Democratic Republic of the Congo gained independence in 1960, the IPNCB came under national control and was placed under the Ministry of Agriculture, where it assumed responsibility for managing the country's national parks. In 1967, it was reorganized and renamed the Institut National pour la Conservation de la Nature (INCN), a change that was further formalized in 1969 by Ordinance-Law No. 69-041 of 22 August, which established the Institute for the Conservation of Nature in the Congo (Institut de la conservation de la nature au Congo; ICNC) under the leadership of Jacques Verschuren and introduced a State Commission for the Environment. Belgian scientific collaboration continued through a cooperation agreement.

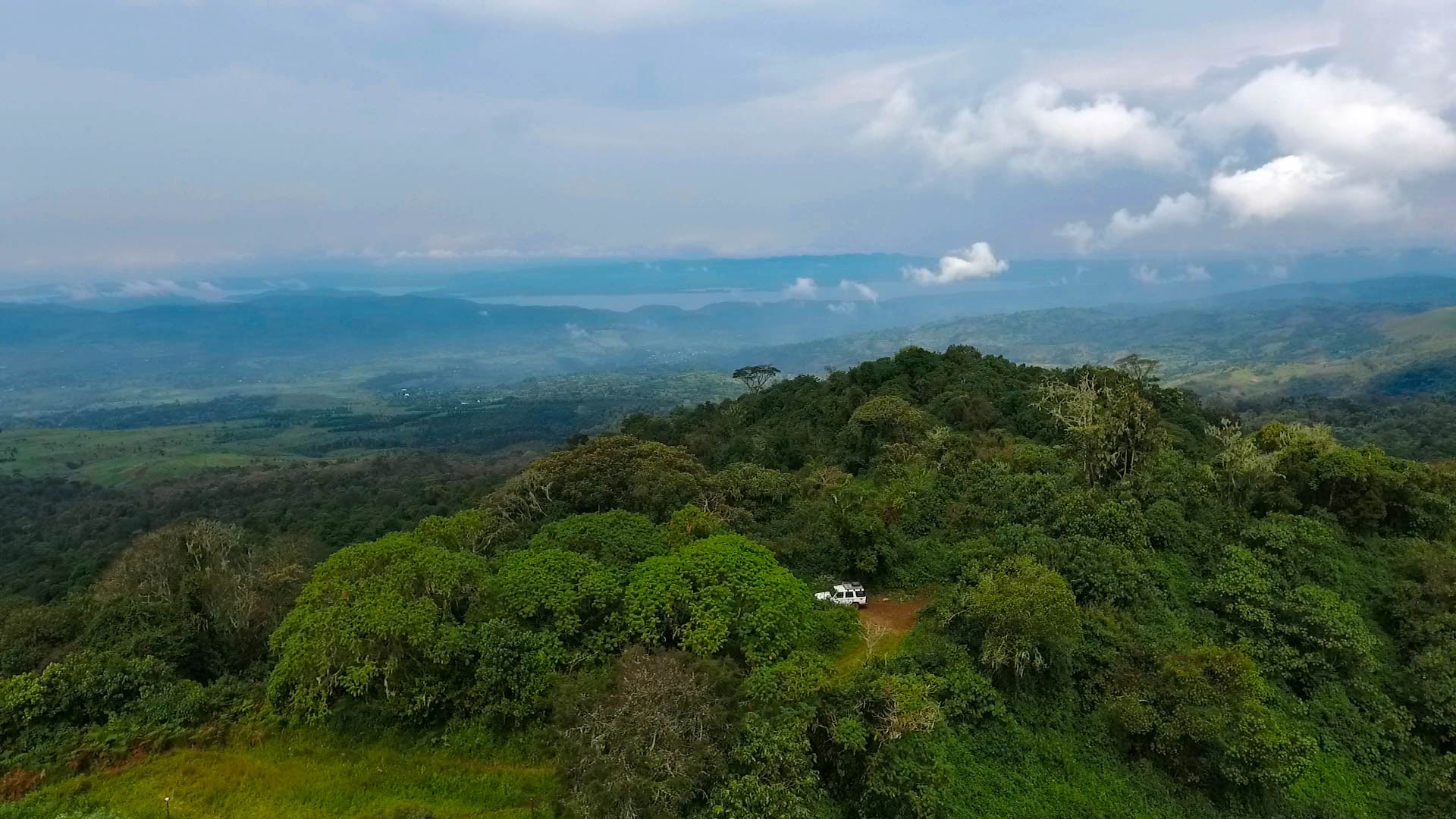
Ariel view of Kahuzi-Biéga National Park

A significant institutional reform ensued in 1975 with Ordinance-Law No. 75-023 of 22 July, which created the Institut Zaïrois pour la Conservation de la Nature (IZCN) and was strengthened by Law No. 78-190 of 5 May 1978 that granted the institution public enterprise status. However, the end of Belgian–Congolese cooperation in 1991, along with subsequent political instability and armed conflicts, negatively affected conservation programs and biodiversity. Following the country's transition from Zaire to the Democratic Republic of the Congo in 1997, the institution adopted its current name, the Institut Congolais pour la Conservation de la Nature (ICCN). In 2010, the ICCN underwent additional institutional reform following its merger with the former Institute of Botanical and Zoological Gardens of Congo (Institut des Jardins Zoologiques et Botaniques du Congo; IJZBC). This restructuring converted it into a public establishment, as defined by Decree No. 10/15 of 10 April 2010, which clarified its legal status and mandate. The ICCN now operates under the general legal provisions applicable to public institutions, as stipulated in Law No. 08/099 of 7 July 2008.

In recent years, the ICCN has carried out a range of programs and initiatives with the support of technical and financial partners. These include revising the National Biodiversity Conservation Strategy (Stratégie nationale de conservation de la biodiversité), originally adopted in 2005, with the assistance of international partners such as the Deutsche Gesellschaft für Internationale Zusammenarbeit (GIZ), developing legal instruments aligned with international environmental conventions, and publishing national strategies for community-based conservation. Additional efforts have focused on management planning, conservation tools, and continuous program evaluation.

== Profile ==
=== Management and organization ===
The ICCN is managed by a management committee headed by a general managing administrator, who is assisted by a technical director administrator, a financial director administrator, and a staff representative. The institution is centrally divided into four main departments: administrative and financial, technical, domains and reserves, and scientific. Provincially, it includes a North Kivu directorate located in Bukavu, a liaison directorate in Lubumbashi, eighteen stations across national parks, and seventeen stations in operational domains and reserves. As a multidisciplinary body, the ICCN employs professionals from a wide range of fields, including veterinary science, biology, geography, wildlife management, economics, commercial and financial studies, agronomy, political and administrative science, social sciences and management, law, physical education and rural development, and history.

=== Protected areas ===
List of protected areas:

Type	Protected areas
National Parks	
	Garamba National Park
	Kahuzi-Biéga National Park
	Kundelungu National Park
	Maiko National Park
	Salonga National Park
	Virunga National Park
	Upemba National Park
Hunting areas and reserves	
	Mangai Hunting Area and Reserve (Domaine de chasse et réserve de Mangai)
	Bili-Uere Hunting Reserve
	Bombo-Lumene Hunting Reserve (Domaine de chasse de Bombo Lumene; DCBL))
	Bushimaie Hunting Area and Reserve (Domaine de chasse et réserve de Bushimaie)
	Basse Kando Hunting Area and Reserve (Domaine de chasse et réserve de Basse Kando)
Other protected areas	
	Itombwe Natural Reserve
	Lomako Fauna Reserve (Réserve de faune de Lomako; RFL)
	Mangrove Marine Park (Parc marin des Mangroves; PMM)
	Mount Hoyo Strict Nature Reserve (Réserve intégrale du Mont Hoyo)
	Nsele Valley Park
	Okapi Wildlife Reserve (Réserve de faune d'Okapi; RFO)
	Tumba-Ledima Natural Reserve (Réserve naturelle de Tumba- Ledîma; RTL)

=== Vegetation ===
The Democratic Republic of the Congo has a rich and diverse plant life. By 2008, it ranked first in Africa for native plant species out of more than 50,000 recorded species on the continent. The country also has a notably high level of endemism. Its vegetation forms several terrestrial ecosystems, including swamp forests, humid tropical (ombrophilous) and afro-montane forests, bamboo forests, Zambezian dry woodlands, Sudanian open forests, coastal forests, mangroves, thickets, and wooded and grassy savannas. At that time, the flora consisted of 377 plant families, including 216 spermatophyte families for terrestrial flora and 107 families for aquatic flora.

=== Fauna ===
The country contains some of the world's most significant reserves of wildlife species and is home to several rare species found nowhere else. As of 2008, species distribution included 352 reptile species, 168 amphibian species, 1,118 bird species, 421 mammal species, 1,596 aquatic invertebrates, 544 terrestrial invertebrate species, and 1,606 aquatic vertebrate species.

=== Cooperation partners ===
Organization and program	Type	Main role and contribution
World Bank	International financial institution	Funding conservation activities, institutional support, feasibility studies, and logistics
United Nations Development Programme (UNDP)	UN agency	Institutional capacity building and logistical support in protected areas
Deutsche Gesellschaft für Internationale Zusammenarbeit (GIZ)	Bilateral cooperation	Biodiversity conservation support, institutional strengthening, research, training, and logistics
United Nations Educational, Scientific and Cultural Organization (UNESCO)	UN agency	Protection of World Heritage Sites and funds conservation projects
European Union	Regional organization	Institutional capacity building and conservation support (e.g., Virunga, Salonga)
Wildlife Conservation Society (WCS)	NGO	Scientific research, biodiversity monitoring, GIS mapping, and conservation training
World Wide Fund for Nature (WWF)	NGO	Environmental conservation support
International Union for Conservation of Nature (IUCN)	International organization	Transboundary conservation programs (Virunga–Volcanoes–Bwindi), and gorilla protection
Zoological Society of Milwaukee (ZSM)	NGO	Bonobo research, ecological studies, and anti-poaching support
Gilman International Conservation Foundation (GIC)	NGO	Anti-poaching, okapi conservation, community development, and training
International Rhino Foundation (IRF)	NGO	Rhino conservation, monitoring, and anti-poaching support
Max Planck Society (MPG)	Research institute	Scientific research (bonobos, ecology, genetics, ethnobotany)
Dian Fossey Gorilla Fund	NGO	Gorilla conservation, monitoring, ranger training, and anti-poaching
Lukuru Wildlife Research Foundation	NGO	Bonobo research, ecological studies, and anti-poaching support
Nouvelles Approches	NGO	Entomological research and insect collection and conservation
ACACIA	Local initiative	Ecological restoration, tourism revival, and community support
International Gorilla Conservation Programme (PICG)	NGO program	Gorilla conservation, patrol support, and community awareness
Monitoring the Illegal Killing of Elephants (MIKE)	Program	Monitoring elephant poaching, data collection, and GIS mapping
Virunga Environmantal Programme (Programme environnemental des Virunga: PEVi)	Program	Community awareness and sustainable resource use education
United States Agency for International Development (USAID)	Government agency	Funding research, conservation infrastructure, and landscape programs

COCOSI (Comité de Coordination du Site) was created in November 1999 as part of a cooperation framework between the ICCN and its partners to coordinate activities at the site level. It is headed by a coordinator, who may be either the site manager or a station chief, and is appointed by mutual agreement in line with internal site regulations. The committee includes the site manager, all station chiefs and their deputies, as well as all partners active at the site.

CoCoCongo (Coalition de conservation au Congo) is a proposed initiative involving the ICCN and its operational partners in the field, aimed at forming a coalition that would bring together partners to pool their resources, expertise, and efforts alongside the ICCN to strengthen environmental governance in the protected areas. The project also seeks to improve the management of donor funding dedicated to biodiversity conservation. While still awaiting formal validation, the ICCN is defining conditions that will provide a structured and cooperative framework for all involved parties.
