= Kobus =

Kobus may refer to:

- Kobus (given name)
- Kobus (surname)
- Kobus (antelope), a genus of antelopes
- Kobus!, South African metal band and their self-titled debut album
- Magnolia kobus, a species of plant
