= ICCN =

ICCN is an initialism for:

- Institut Congolais pour la Conservation de la Nature
- International Conference on Computational Nanoscience and Nanotechnology
- Interfaith Climate Change Network
- Indiana Classic Car Network or Illinois Classic Car Network
- International Center on Conflict and Negotiation
- Inner City Computer Network
- Intercultural Conflict, Communication and Negotiation
