= Kahuzi-Biéga National Park =

National park in the Democratic Republic of the Congo

- IUCN category II (national park)
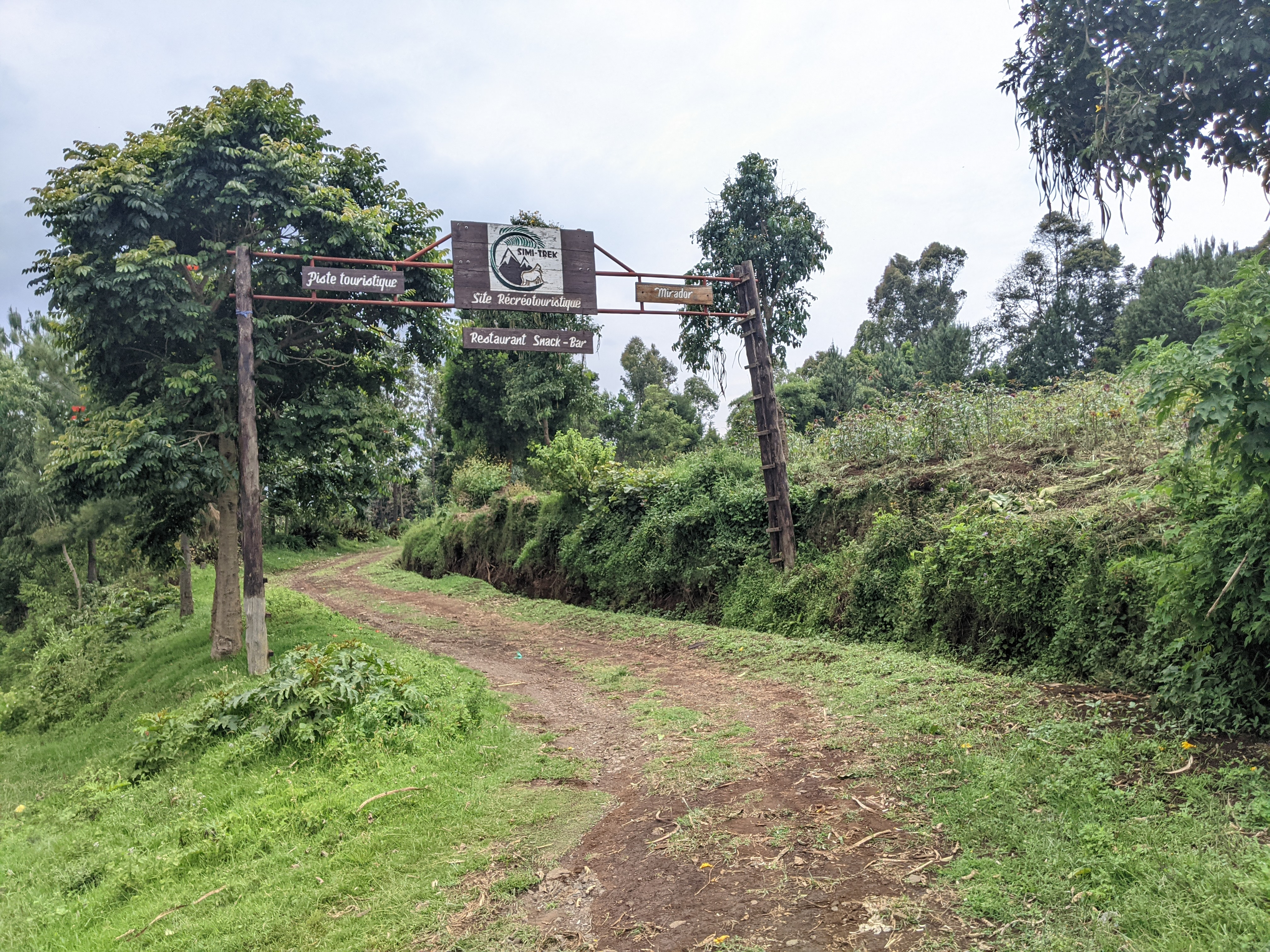
- Park entrance

- Location within Democratic Republic of the Congo
- Location: Democratic Republic of the Congo
- Coordinates: 2°30′0″S 28°45′0″E
- Area: 6,000 km^{2} (2,300 sq mi)
- Established: 1970
- Governing body: Institut Congolais pour la Conservation de la Nature

UNESCO World Heritage Site
- Type: Natural
- Criteria: x
- Designated: 1980 (4th session)
- Reference no.: 137
- Region: Africa
- Endangered: 1997–present

The Kahuzi-Biega National Park (Swahili: Hifadhi ya Taifa ya Kahuzi-Biega, French: Parc national de Kahuzi-Biega) is a protected area near Bukavu town in eastern Democratic Republic of the Congo. It is situated near the western bank of Lake Kivu and the Rwandan border.

== History ==
The earliest reserve, the Zoological and Forest Reserve of Mount Kahuzi, was created on 27 July 1937 by the then Governor General of the Belgian Colonial administration. That reserve has been part of the Kahuzi-Biega National Park since November 1970 when it was established in 1970 by the Belgian photographer and conservationist Adrien Deschryver. Five years later, the park was extended to cover 6,000 km^{2} (2,300 sq mi).

The park was declared a UNESCO World Heritage Site in 1980, under Criterion (x) for its unique habitat of rainforest and diversity of the mammal species, particularly eastern lowland gorillas.

In 1997 the park was put on the List of World Heritage in Danger because of the political instability of the region, an influx of refugees and increasing wildlife exploitation.

== Geography ==
With an area of 6,000 km^{2} (2,300 sq mi), Kahuzi-Biega is one of the biggest national parks in the country. Set in both mountainous and lowland terrain, the park lies west of the town of Bukavu in South Kivu Province. The smaller, 600 km^{2} (230 sq mi) eastern part of the park lies in the Mitumba Mountains of the Albertine Rift in the Great Rift Valley. The larger, 5,400 km^{2} (2,100 sq mi) western part is mainly lowland terrain stretching from Bukavu to Kisangani. It is drained by the Luka and Lugulu rivers which flow into the Lualaba River. A 7.4 km (4.6 mi) wide corridor connects the two parts. Two dormant volcanoes are set within the park's limits and lend their names to it: Kahuzi (3,308 m (10,853 ft)) and Biéga (2,790 m (9,150 ft)).

=== Climate ===
The park receives an average annual precipitation of 1,800 mm (71 in). The average maximum temperature in the area is 18 °C (64 °F) while the minimum is 10.4 °C (50.7 °F).

== Environment ==
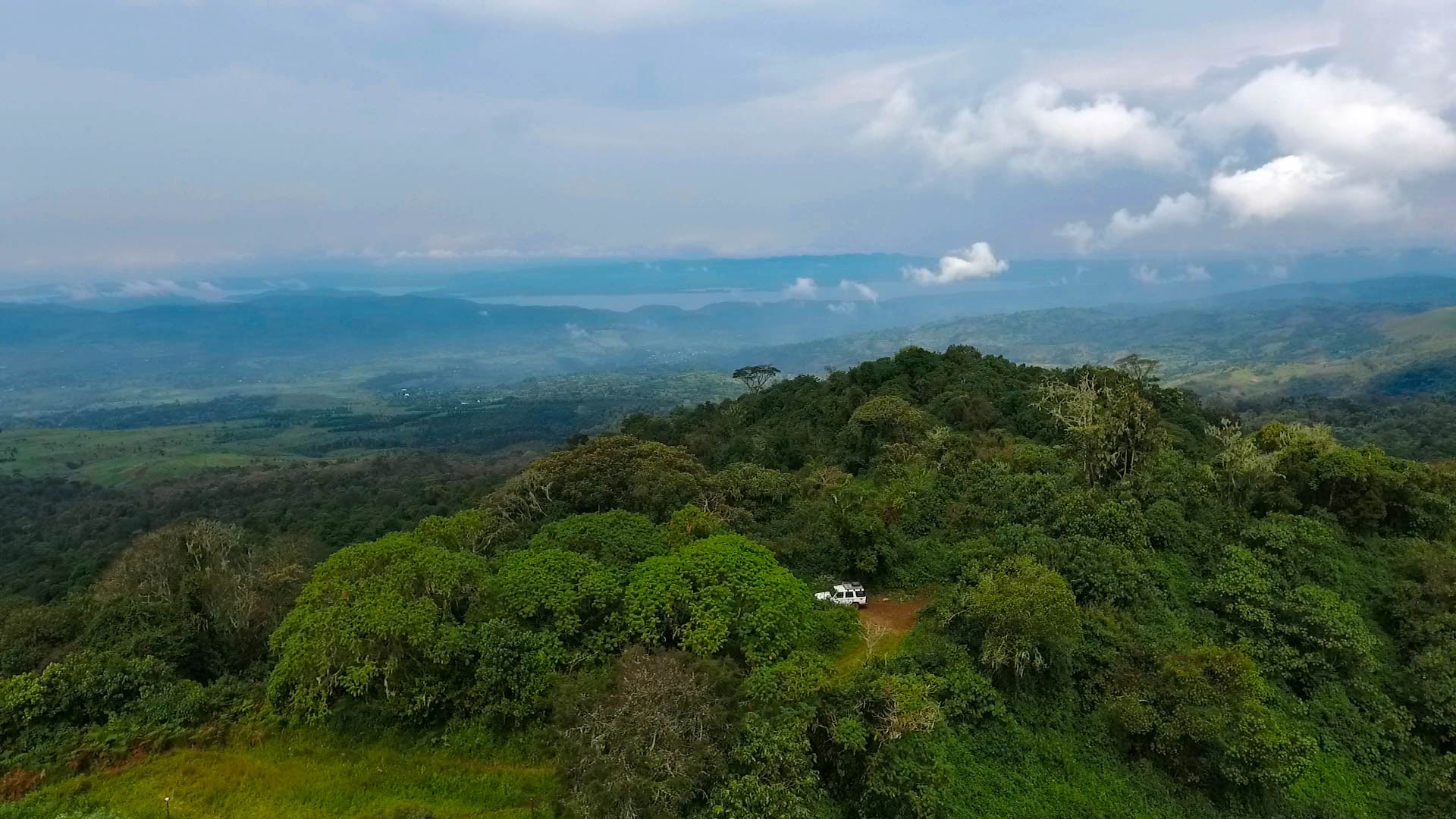
Kahuzi-Biega National Park

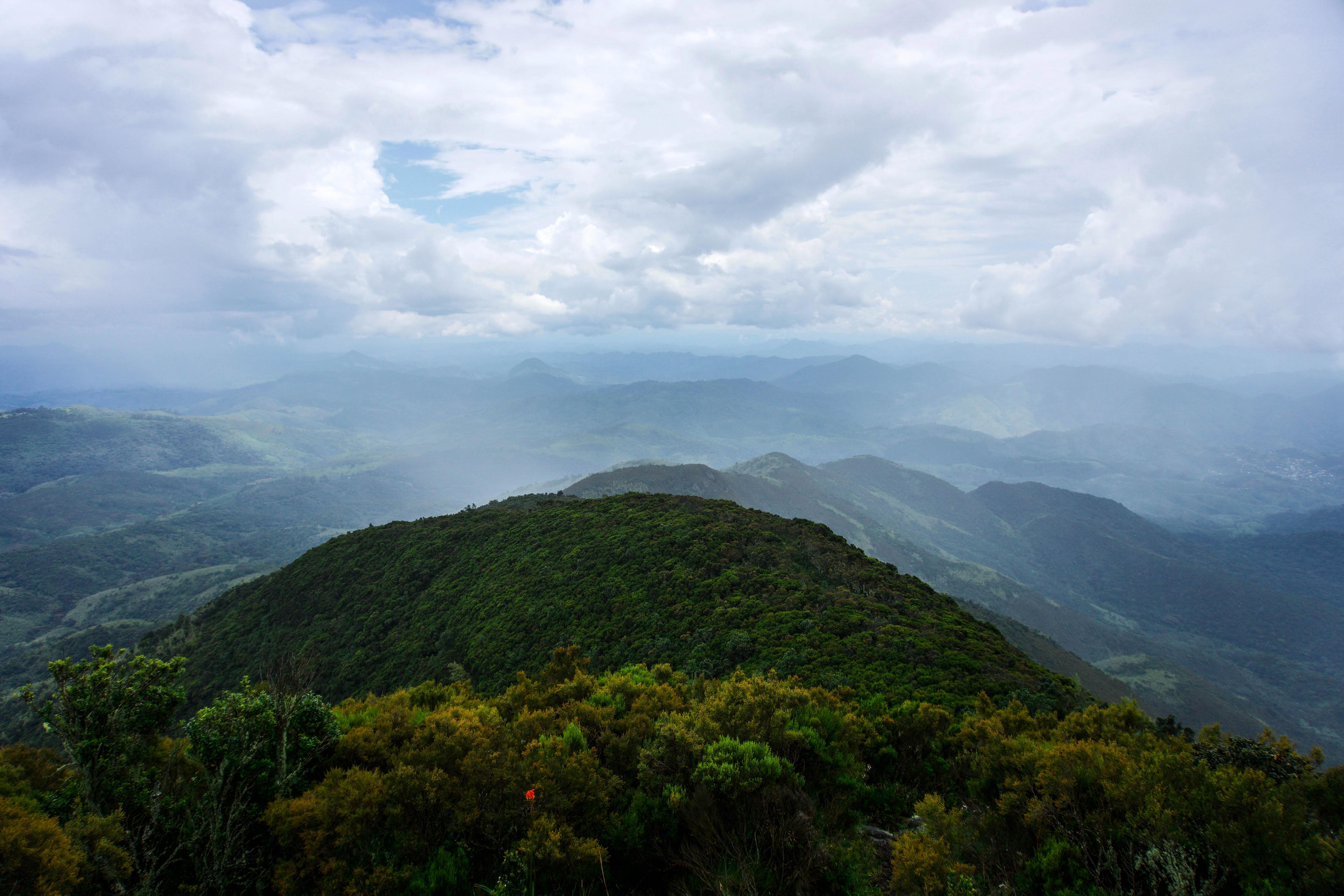
View from the top of Mount Kahuzi

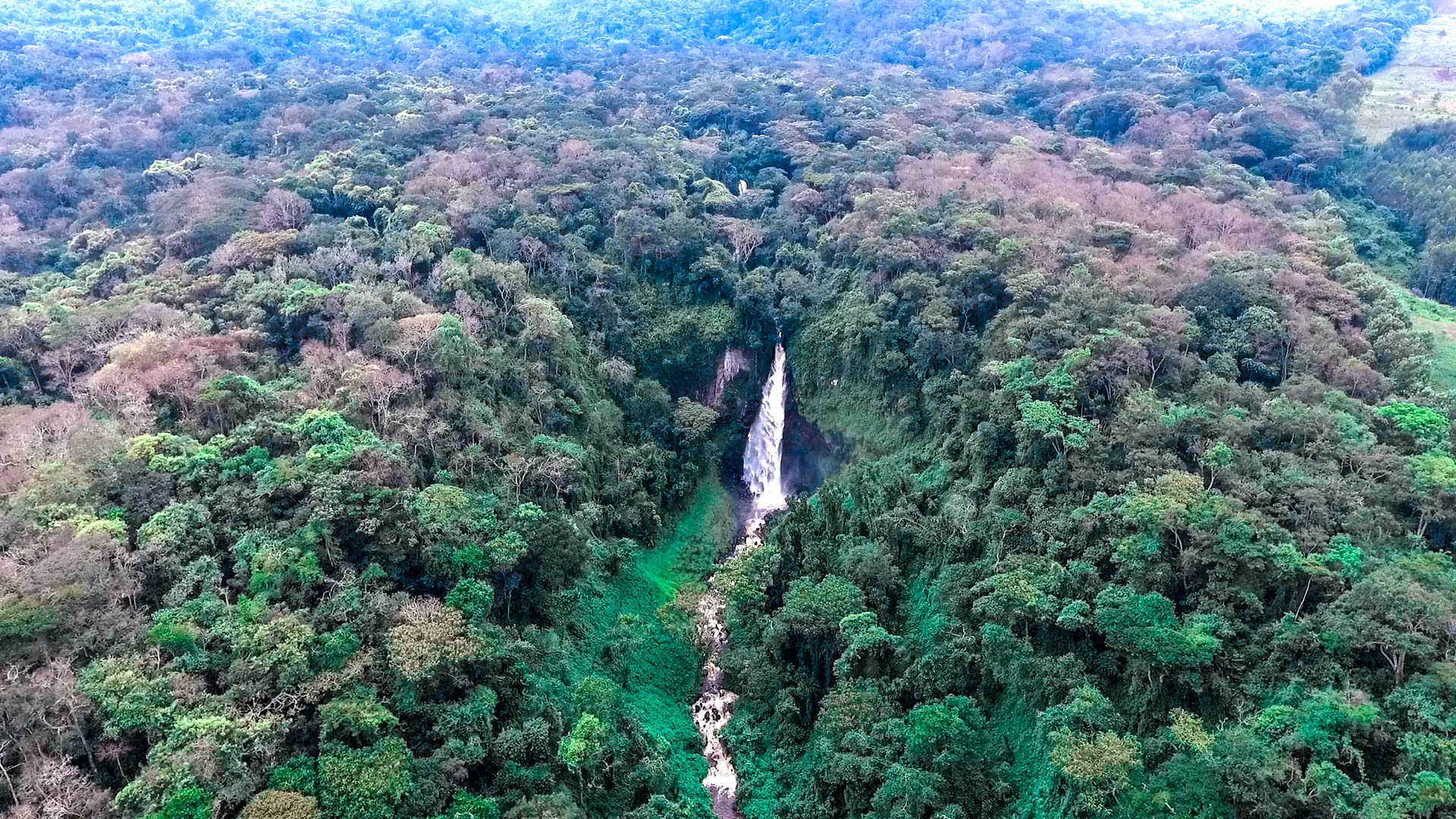
Waterfall in the park

The park has a rich diversity of flora and fauna. As of a survey conducted in 2003 by the Wildlife Conservation Society, it protects roughly 349 species of birds and 136 species of mammals. Over 1,178 plant species have been observed in the highland regions of the park alone. Because of its varied topography and habitat types, Kahuzi-Biega National Park is also a hotspot for plants and endemic vertebrates.

=== Flora ===
The park's swamps, bogs, marshland and riparian forests on hydromorphic ground at all altitudes are rare worldwide. The western lowland sector of the park is dominated by dense Guineo-Congolian wet equatorial rainforest, part of the Northeastern Congolian lowland forests ecoregion, with an area of transition forest between 1,200 m (3,900 ft) and 1,500 m (4,900 ft).

The eastern mountainous sector includes continuous forest vegetation from 600 metres (2,000 ft) to over 2,600 metres (8,500 ft), and is one of the rare sites in Sub-Saharan Africa which demonstrates all stages of the low to highland transition, including six distinguishable primary vegetation types: swamp and peat bog, swamp forest, high-altitude rainforest, mountain rainforest, bamboo forest and subalpine heather.

The montane rain forests are part of the Albertine Rift montane forests ecoregion. Mountain and swamp forest grows between 2,000 m (6,600 ft) and 2,400 m (7,900 ft), bamboo forest grows between 2,350 m (7,710 ft) and 2,600 m (8,500 ft), and the summits of Mounts Kahuzi and Biéga above 2,600 metres (8,500 ft) have subalpine heather, dry savanna, and grasslands, as well as an endemic subspecies of Dendrosenecio erici-rosenii (D. e. erici-rosenii).

=== Fauna ===
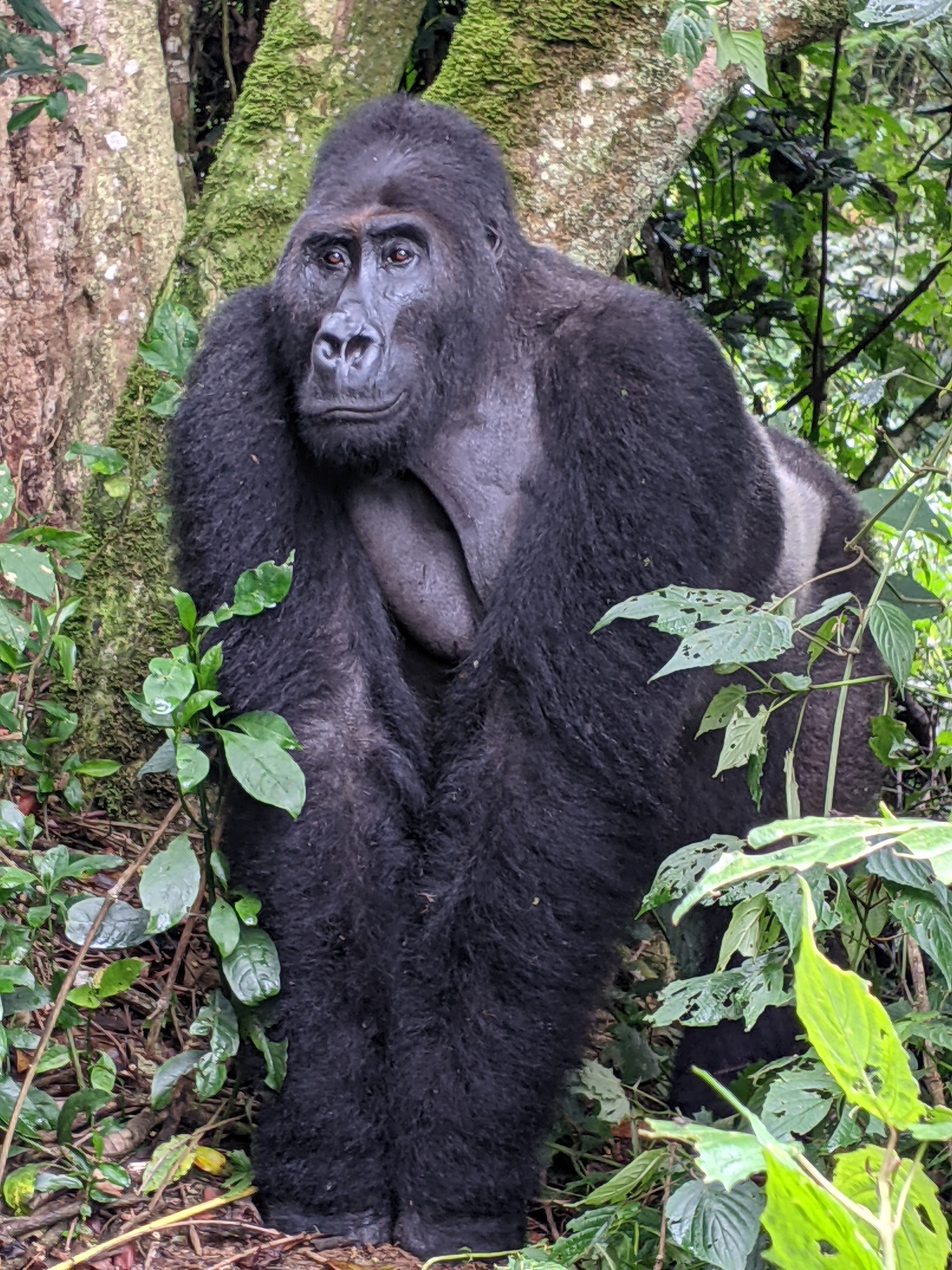
Eastern lowland gorilla in the park

The national park protects a greater diversity of mammal species than any other national park in the Albertine Rift. Among the 136 species of mammals identified in the park, the eastern lowland gorilla is the most prominent. According to a 2008 status report of the DR of Congo, the park had 125 lowland gorillas, a marked reduction from the figure of 600 gorillas of the pre-1990s conflict period, and consequently the species has been inscribed on the endangered list. The park is the last refuge of this rare primate. According to the census survey of eastern lowland gorillas reported by the Wildlife Conservation Society in April 2011, at least 181 gorillas were recorded in the park.

Other primates include the eastern chimpanzee, several species of Cercopithecinae (including the olive baboon) and Colobinae, as well as Hamlyn's monkey. Some of the other mammals include the forest elephant, forest buffalo, hippopotamus, leopard, giant forest hog, bongo, needle-clawed bushbaby, Maclaud's horseshoe bat, Ruwenzori otter shrew, Mount Kahuzi climbing mouse and Alexander's bush squirrel. Two species of genet that live within the park are endemic to the Congo Basin: the aquatic genet and the giant forest genet.

Of the 349 bird species identified within the park, at least 42 of them are endemic to the region, including the threatened Albertine owlet. Other native bird species include the yellow-crested helmet shrike, Congo peafowl, African green broadbill, and Rockefeller's sunbird. The park has been designated an Important Bird Area (IBA) by BirdLife International because it supports significant populations of many bird species.

A 2020 survey of the freshwater fish in the park and its three drainage basins identified 147 species, 11 of which were found to be endemic to the Lowa River basin, and 7 of which were previously undescribed. Cyprinidae was by far the largest family represented.

== Conservation and management ==
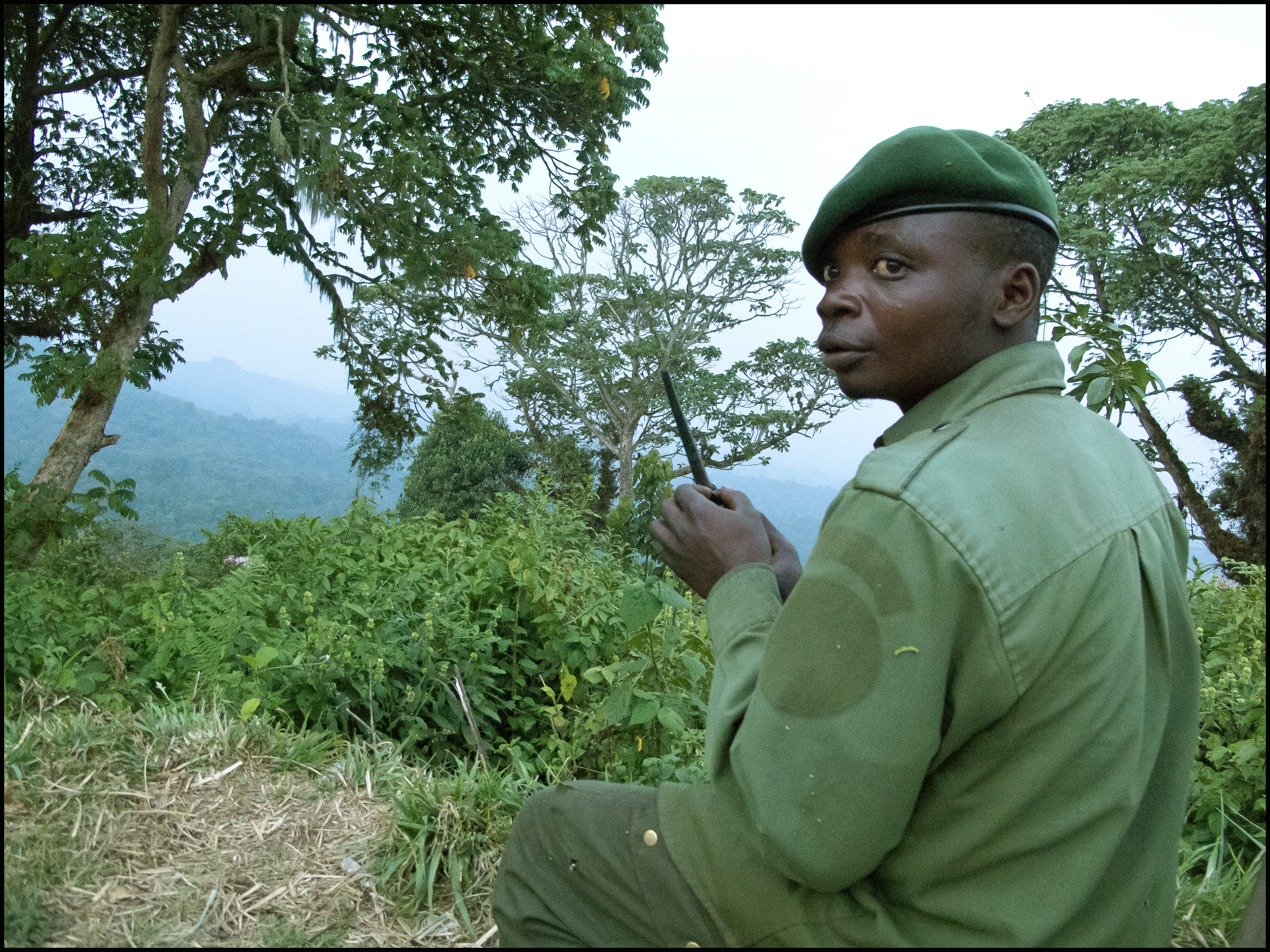
Park ranger

The park, under the management of the Institut Congolais pour la Conservation de la Nature, has a basic management and surveillance structure. However, the park's 1975 expansion, which included inhabited lowland areas, resulted in forced evacuations with about 13,000 people of the tribal community of Shi, Tembo and Rega affected and refusing to leave. Cooperation by the communities living around the park and employment of the Twa people to enforce park protection was pursued by the park authorities. In 1999, a plan was developed to protect the people and the resources of the park.

Illegal artisanal mining of Coltan happens in the park, thus damaging the deep forest cover.

In a survey conducted between 2015 and 2016, the national park rangers reported a low level of satisfaction with the job, highlighting low salaries, lack of support from the authorities, and poor living conditions.

=== Human rights abuses ===
In 2019, national park rangers allegedly engaged in violence against Batwa who returned to the park in 2018. This included the alleged killing of a number of residents, the burning of villages, as well as the use of sexual violence against indigenous residents.

In 2022, the African Commission on Human and Peoples’ Rights ruled that the Democratic Republic of the Congo violated the human rights of Batwa people according to the African Charter, including by evicting them from ancestral territories without prior consent when the Kahuzi-Biega National Park was created. The case was filed in 2015 but the decision was made public in June 2024.

== See also ==
- World Heritage Sites in Danger
