= Adrien Deschryver =

Belgian conservationist (1939–1989)

- Born: May 11, 1939; Bruges, Belgium
- Died: March 23, 1989 (aged 49)
- Occupations: Conservationist, photographer
- Spouse: Agnes Bujiriri M'Rwankuba

Adrien Deschryver (May 11, 1939 – March 23, 1989) was a Belgian photographer and conservationist, who established and was chief warden of the Kahuzi-Biega National Park near the western bank of Lake Kivu and the Rwandan border in 1970, and acted to maintain law and order within the park during a civil war around Bukavu.

== Work in Africa ==
=== Early work with Gorillas ===
In the 1960s, Deschryver and Dian Fossey gained much prominence in their approach of two subspecies of gorillas in Rwanda and the Democratic Republic of the Congo. The former had started approaching gorillas during the mid-1960s for tourism, accompanied by two trackers of the Pygmy tribe, Pili Pili Purusi and Mishebere Patrice.

=== Creation and work in the Kahuzi-Biega National Park ===
In 1970, Deschryver convinced the recently created Congolese administration of the need for an extended protected natural reserve in the region, the hunting of gorillas having reduced their population to a critical level. This led to the creation that year of the Kahuzi-Biega National Park.

The 1974 documentary Gorilla showed Deschryver bringing an abandoned baby gorilla into the forest to help it adjust to its natural habitat. The baby gorilla began to call out when it heard other gorillas, and was subsequently dropped by Deschryver when the dominant silverback several times very aggressively screamed at him and then made one last charge at him. The silverback had earlier attempted to either attack or intimidate Deschryver, but ultimately backed away when Deschryver did not move or flinch. The clip of Deschryver resisting the silverback's earlier charge has since gone viral, with memes concerning Deschryver's courageousness. Others have noted that the clip shows how demeanor and fearlessness can establish dominance over size and strength. Dian Fossey criticized Deschryver for this action and for simply running away afterwards. She claimed that the baby gorilla was never seen again.

Deschryver identified the habitats of eastern lowland gorillas after consulting with Twa villagers in the park during the early 1970s. In the mid-1970s, he returned to their villages with Congolese troops and park guards, destroying several and forcibly displacing their inhabitants. Deschryver died in unclear circumstances, possibly through poisoning, and is buried at the Tshivanga headquarters.
