= Convention for the Preservation of Wild Animals, Birds and Fish in Africa =

1900 multilateral treaty on nature conservation

The Convention for the Preservation of Wild Animals, Birds and Fish in Africa (also known as the London Convention of 1900) is a multilateral treaty on wildlife preservation that was signed by the European colonial powers in London in 1900. Although it never entered into force, it has nevertheless been recognised as one of history's earliest agreements on nature conservation.

== Conclusion and ratifications ==
The convention was concluded and signed on 19 May 1900 by France, Germany, the United Kingdom, Italy, Portugal, Spain, and the Congo Free State. The treaty required all signatory states to ratify it before entering into force; because most of the signatories did not ratify the agreement, it never entered into force.

== Protective categories ==
A key innovation of the convention—which is still used today in conservation treaties—was the inclusion of schedules which placed animals in different categories of protection.

=== Schedule 1: Absolute prohibition on hunting or destruction ===
The animals in Schedule 1 were to be protected from all hunting and destruction; this was done either because of the animals' perceived "usefulness" or "their rarity and threatened extermination":

- vultures (usefulness)
- secretary-birds (usefulness)
- owls (usefulness)
- rhinoceros-birds or beef-eaters (Buphaga) (usefulness)
- giraffes (rarity)
- gorillas (rarity)
- chimpanzees (rarity)
- mountain zebras (rarity)
- wild asses (rarity)
- white-tailed gnus (Connochaetes gnu) (rarity)
- elands (Taurotragus) (rarity)
- little Liberian hippopotamuses (rarity)

=== Schedules 2 and 3: Prohibition on hunting or destruction while young or mothering ===
The animals in Schedule 2 were to be protected from all hunting and destruction while the animals were young. Female animals in Schedule 3 were to be protected from all hunting and destruction when they were accompanied by their young. The lists of animals in Schedules 2 and 3 were identical:

- elephants (tusks under 5 kg were to be confiscated)
- rhinoceroses
- hippopotamuses
- zebras of species not mentioned in Schedule 1
- buffaloes
- ibexes
- chevrotains (Tragulus)
- antelopes and gazelles (especially species of the genera Bubalis, Damaliscus, Connochaetes, Cephalophus, Oreotragus, Oribia,Rhaphiceros, Nesolagus, Madogna, Cobus, Cervicapra, Pelea, Aepyceros, Antidorcas, Gazella, Ammodorcas, Litocranius, Docolragus, Oryx, Addax, Hippotragus, Taurotragus, Tragelaphus)

=== Schedule 4: Animals that may be hunted or destroyed in limited numbers ===
The animals in Schedule 4 were to be protected from hunting and destruction "except in limited numbers":

- all animals listed in Schedules 2 and 3
- the various pigs
- Colobi and all the fur-monkeys
- aardvarks (Crycteropux)
- dugongs (Hulicore)
- manatees (Manatus)
- the small cats
- servals
- cheetali (Cynalurus)
- jackals
- aardwolves (Proteles)
- small monkeys
- ostriches
- marabous
- egrets
- bustards
- francolins, guinea-fowl, other "game" birds
- large tortoises

=== Schedule 5: Harmful animals desirable to be reduced in number ===
The animals in Schedule 5 were designated "harmful" and the treaty regarded them as desirable to be reduced in numbers "within sufficient limits":

- lions
- leopards
- hyaenas
- African hunting dog (Lycaon pictus)
- otters (Lutra)
- baboons (Cynocephalus) and other harmful monkeys
- crocodiles
- poisonous snakes
- pythons
- large birds of prey other than those mentioned in Schedule 1

The convention encouraged the destruction of the eggs of crocodiles, poisonous snakes, and pythons.

== Other provisions ==
The convention encouraged the creation of wildlife reserves. It would have prohibited the use of nets and pitfalls in hunting and the use of explosives or poison on fish. The convention allowed for the creation of export duties on animal hides, tusks, and antlers.

== Replacement ==
The treaty never entered into force and in 1933 was replaced by the Convention Relative to the Preservation of Fauna and Flora in their Natural State.
