= Kobus (surname) =

Kobus is a surname. Notable people with the surname include:

- Agnieszka Kobus (born 1990), Polish rower
- Arthur Kobus (1879–1945), German general during the Second World War
- Jan Derk Kobus (1858–1910), Dutch agricultural chemist and botanist
- Waldemar Kobus (born 1966), German actor

== See also ==
- Anita Kobuß (born 1944), East German sprint canoeist
