= African Convention on the Conservation of Nature and Natural Resources =

Continent-wide agreement signed in 1968 in Algiers

Convention on Conservation
African Convention on the Conservation of Nature and Natural Resources
- Context: Nature conservation
- Signed: September 15, 1968
- Location: Algiers
- Effective: June 16, 1969
- Signatories: 42 Countries: Algeria; Angola; Benin; Botswana; Burkina Faso; Burundi; Cameroon; Central African Republic; Chad; Comoros; Congo; Côte d'Ivoire; Democratic Republic of the Congo; Djibouti; Egypt; Ethiopia; Gabon; Gambia; Ghana; Guinea; Kenya; Lesotho; Liberia; Libya; Madagascar; Mali; Mauritania; Mauritius; Niger; Nigeria; Rwanda; São Tomé and Príncipe; Senegal; Sierra Leone; Somalia; Sudan; Swaziland; Tanzania; Togo; Tunisia; Uganda; Zambia
- Ratifiers: 30 Countries: Algeria; Burkina Faso; Cameroon; Central African Republic; Comoros; Congo; Côte d'Ivoire; Democratic Republic of the Congo; Djibouti; Egypt; Gabon; Ghana; Kenya; Liberia; Madagascar; Malawi; Mali; Mozambique; Niger; Nigeria; Rwanda; Senegal; Seychelles; Sudan; Swaziland; Tanzania; Togo; Tunisia; Uganda; Zambia

The African Convention on the Conservation of Nature and Natural Resources (known also as Algiers Convention) is a continent-wide agreement signed in 1968 in Algiers. It supersedes the Convention Relative to the Preservation of Fauna and Flora in their Natural State of 1933 and has been superseded by the African Convention on Conservation of Nature and Natural Resources (revised) signed in Maputo in 2003.

== Background ==
International cooperation to conserve the wildlife and natural resources of Africa was first realized by the colonizing powers of Great Britain, France, Germany, Portugal, and Spain on May 19, 1900 with the International agreement to preserve African wildlife(King Leopold's Congo Free State did not participate). The treaty prohibited the killing of certain African animals and "all other animals which each local government judges necessary to protect, either because of their usefulness or because of their rarity and danger of disappearance.” The treaty was proposed because of the rapid depletion of African big game which was being hunted for pleasure by Europeans, with a secondary motive being to preserve the remarkable and novel wildlife and fauna of the continent. African animal populations at the time were suffering because of deforestation, breech-loaded firearms, growth in human populations, and overhunting. This treaty, however, did not address the entire African ecosystem but only a handful of species. The Convention Relative to the Preservation of Fauna and Flora in their Natural State began to address the conservation of whole African ecosystems. When European colonies gained independence as sovereign nations, pressure for a new and more comprehensive conservation treaty began to mount.

== Treaty Content and Obligations ==
The treaty was influenced by other existing international law and tenets of the UN charter, and sought to balance development through exploitation of natural resources with their conservation. It obliges all parties to take conservation measures relating to national wildlife, soil, water resources.
