= Mitumba Mountains =

Mountain range of the Democratic Republic of the Congo

- Monts Mitumba
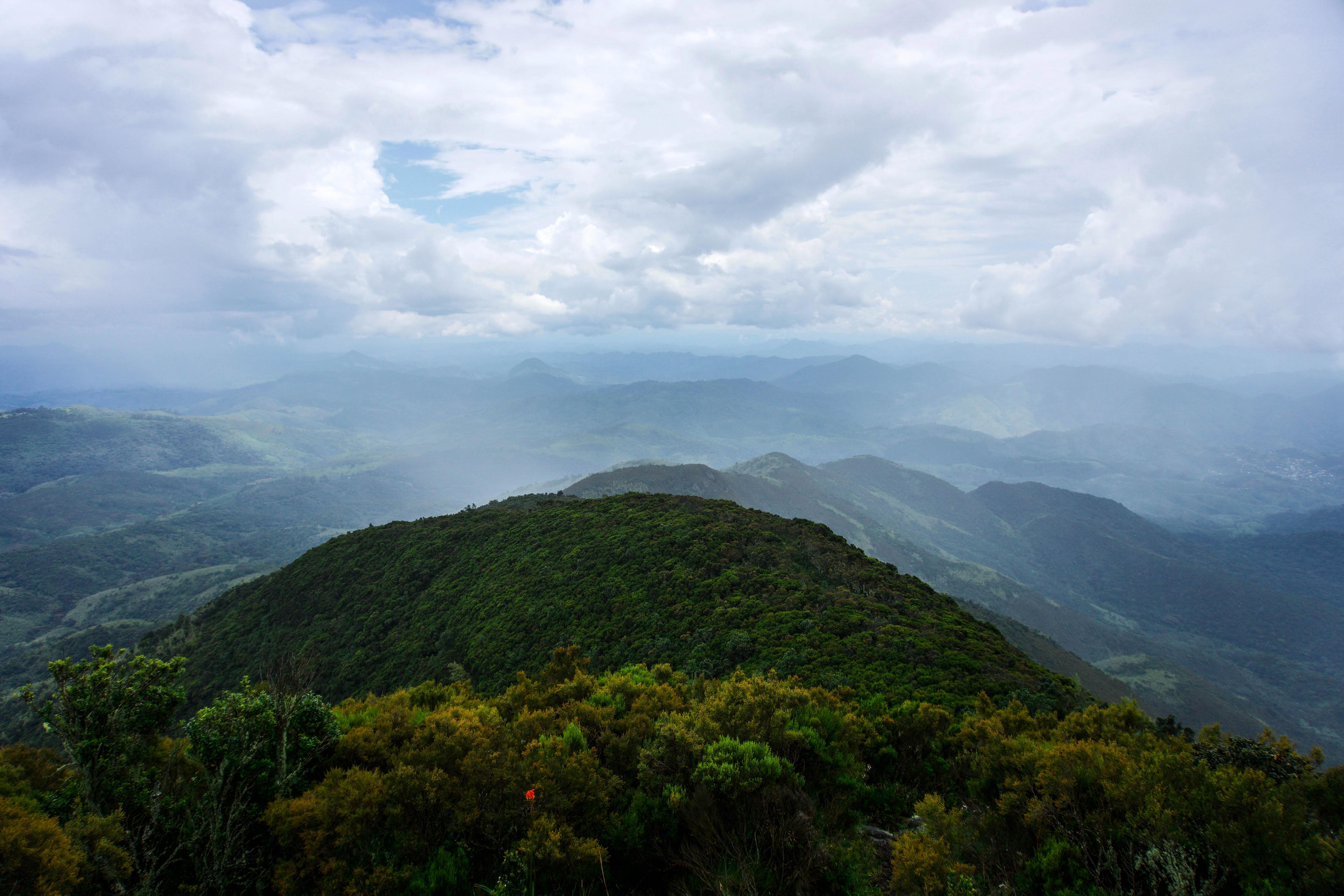
- View from Mount Kahuzi

Highest point
- Peak: Mount Kahuzi
- Elevation: 3,308 m (10,853 ft)
- Coordinates: 2.249216°S 28.691139°E

Geography
- Location within Democratic Republic of the Congo
- Country: Democratic Republic of the Congo
- Province: South Kivu

The Mitumba Mountains stretch along the Western Rift Valley in Eastern Congo (DRC), west of Lake Tanganyika and Lake Kivu. The two main peaks, Mount Kahuzi (3,308 m) and Mount Biéga (2,790 m) are dormant volcanoes. The northern portion of the range is also known as the Itombwe Mountains or Itombwe Plateau.

== Ecology ==
Most of the mountain range is in the Albertine Rift montane forests ecoregion. At lower elevations, the montane forests transition to lowland rain forests at the northern end of the range, to forest–savanna mosaic in the central portion of the range, and miombo woodlands to the south.

Gambeya gorungosana and Syzygium guineense are characteristic trees of the primary or mature montane forests. Macaranga kilimandscharica, Neoboutonia macrocalyx, and Xymalos monospora are trees typical of secondary forests, which regrow in areas cleared by wind or human disturbance.

== Protected areas ==
Kahuzi-Biéga National Park covers a portion of the mountains, including mounts Kahuzi and Biéga.
