= Jan Derk Kobus =

Dutch agricultural chemist and botanist

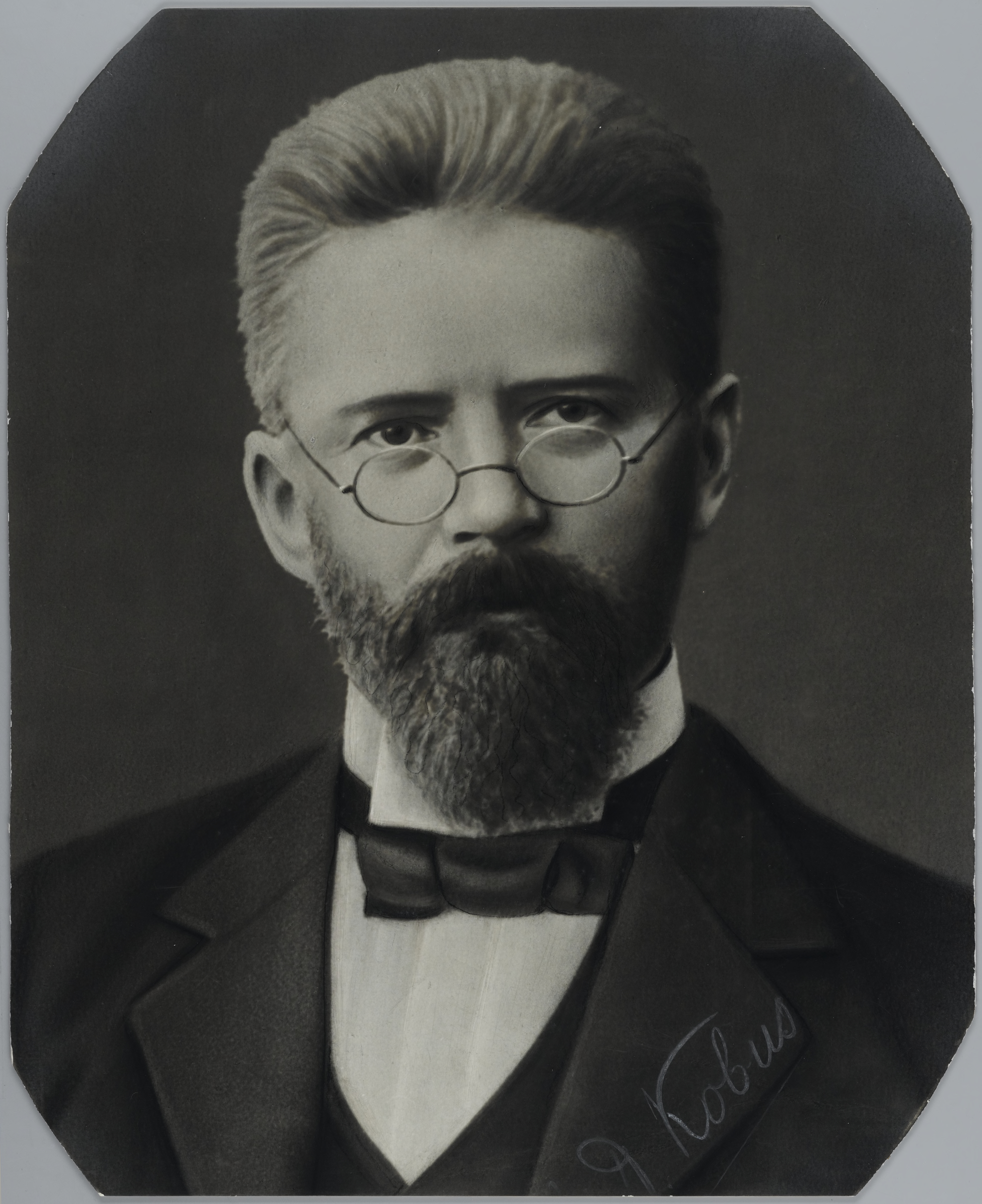
c. 1910

Jan Derk Kobus (11 March 1858 – 11 March 1910) was a Dutch agricultural chemist and botanist. He headed the sugar experimental station in Dutch Java at Pasoeroean where he was involved in early experimental hybridization of sugarcane.

== Life and work ==
Kobus was born in Deventer and went to the local school before studying chemistry at the Georg August University of Göttingen, the University of Halle and at the Royal Saxon Forestry Academy, Tharandt. He then worked at the Agricultural Research Station in Wageningen. He took a special interest in botany, examining the genera Carex and Cyperus. In 1886 he was appointed as deputy director for the experimental station of the sugar industry in Dutch Java at Pasoeroean. Here he was involved in studies on sugarcane diseases and in the breeding of high-yielding and disease resistant sugarcane hybrids and the selection of varieties. He edited the journal, Archief voor de Java Suikerindustrie, of the Javan sugar industry from 1893 and became directory of the experimental station in 1897. He was knighted in the order of the Orange Nassau in 1899 by the Dutch queen Wilhelmina. He was also admitted to the Leopoldina Academy in 1907.

Kobus died on his birthday while aboard the steamer Goentoer while returning to the Netherlands.
