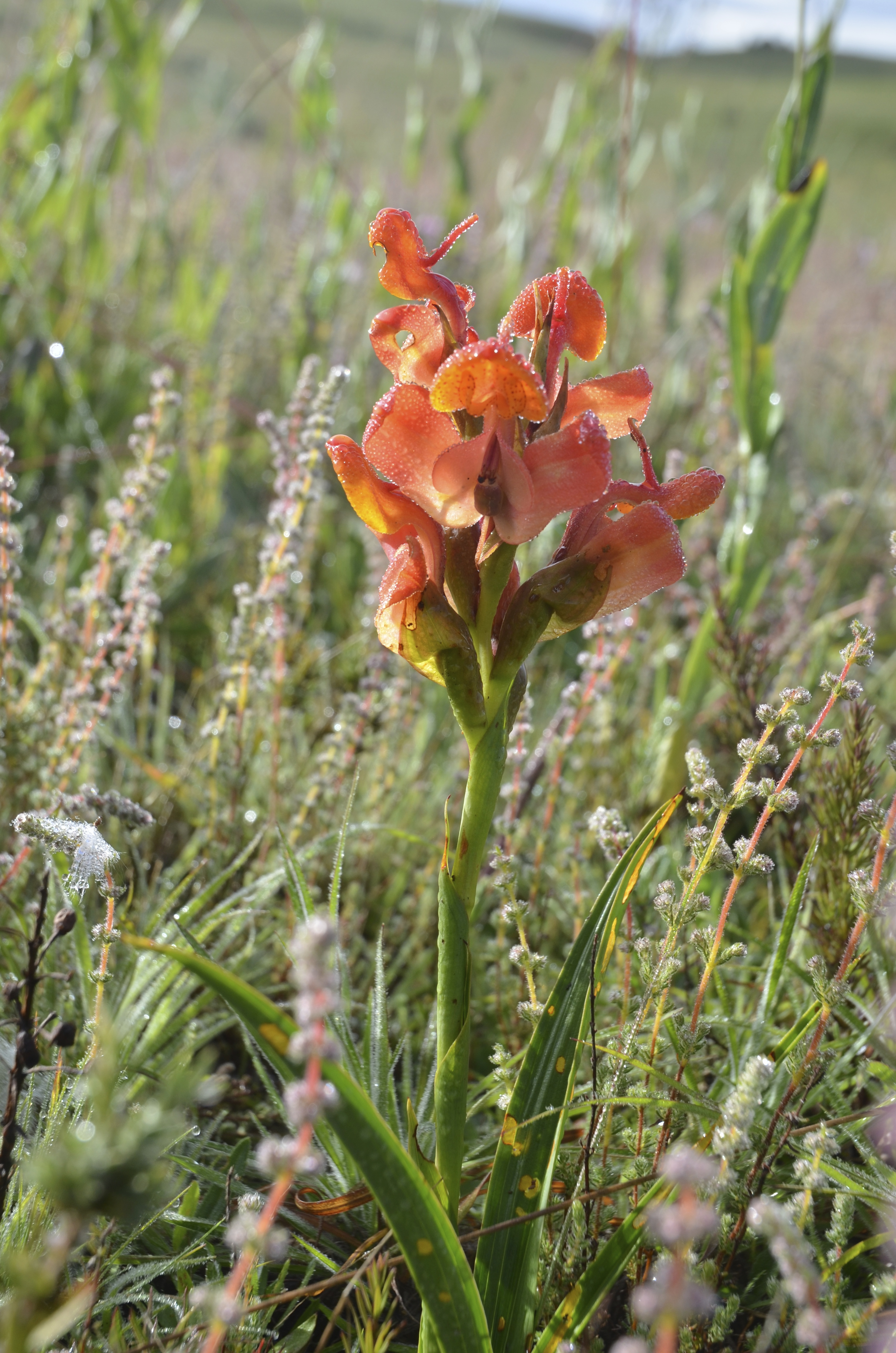

Conservation status
- Least Concern (IUCN 3.1)

Scientific classification
- Kingdom: Plantae
- Clade: Tracheophytes
- Clade: Angiosperms
- Clade: Monocots
- Order: Asparagales
- Family: Orchidaceae
- Subfamily: Orchidoideae
- Genus: Disa
- Species: D. erubescens

Binomial name
- Disa erubescens Rendle

= Disa erubescens =

Species of flowering plant

Disa erubescens is a perennial plant and geophyte belonging to the genus Disa. The plant is native to Angola, Burundi, Democratic Republic of the Congo, Cameroon, Kenya, Malawi, Mozambique, Nigeria, Rwanda, Sudan, Tanzania, Uganda, Zambia and Zimbabwe.

There are two subspecies:

- Disa erubescens subsp. carsonii (N.E.Br.) H.P.Linder
- Disa erubescens subsp. erubescens
