= Mount Kahuzi =

- Location within Democratic Republic of the Congo

Highest point
- Elevation: 10,850 ft (3,310 m)
- Coordinates: 2.249216°S 28.691139°E

Naming
- Native name: Ntondo Kahuzi (Shi)

Geography
- Location: Democratic Republic of the Congo
- Parent range: Mitumba Range

Geology
- Mountain type: Stratovolcano (extinct)

Mount Kahuzi is an extinct volcano in the Democratic Republic of the Congo. It is within the Kahuzi-Biéga National Park, a World Heritage Site.

== History ==
On 1 September 2008, a Beechcraft 1900C-1 registered as ZS-OLD operated by CEM Air for the charity Air Serv International was 15 km out on approach to Bukavu when it flew into a steep ridge on the mountain at 10,000 ft near Bukavu-Kavumu. All 15 passengers and 2 crew aboard were killed.

== Location ==
Mount Kahuzi was last active at the end of the Pleistocene. At 3,317 metres (10,883 ft) it is the highest peak in the Mitumba Range, which runs along the west shore of Lake Kivu in the Albertine Rift. The eastern part of the Biega - Kahuzi National Park, a World Heritage Site, lies on the slopes of the mountain. The Zoological and Forest Reserve of Mount Kahuzi was created by decree on 27 July 1937, and extended in 1951 to include the Biega forest. It was gazetted as a national park in 1970.

== Flora ==
Vegetation includes wet lowland rain forest, transitional rainforest and Afromontaine vegetation that is dominated by tree heathers. Hedythrsus thamnoideus and Disa erubescens grow on one summit of Mount Kahuzi. On its main summit, between 3,200 metres (10,500 ft) and 3,308 metres (10,853 ft) Erica spp. grows, as well as Senecio kahuzicus, Helichrysum mildbraedii, Huperzia saururus, and Deschampsia flexuosa.

== Fauna ==
Gorillas are found in the region, including the mountain slopes. In 1993 the population around Mount Kahuzi was estimated to be about 275 individuals. Their population was devastated during the Second Congo War of the late 1990s.

The extremely rare Mount Kahuzi climbing mouse has been found on its slopes. Only two specimens have been found, both in the same location in the highly threatened montane forest on Mount Kahuzi at an elevation of around 2,000 metres (6,600 ft).
