= Convention Relative to the Preservation of Fauna and Flora in their Natural State =

1933 environmental treaty

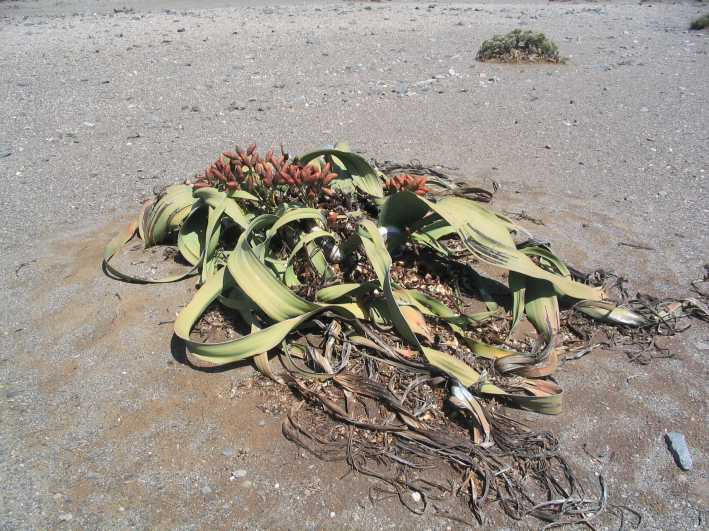
- Welwitchia, a species protected by the Convention
- Context: Wildlife conservation
- Drafted: November 8, 1933
- Location: London
- Effective: January 14, 1936
- Condition: 4 ratifications
- Ratifiers: Belgium; Kingdom of Egypt; Kingdom of Italy; Anglo-Egyptian Sudan; Union of South Africa; United Kingdom; British India; Tanganyika; Portugal
- Depositary: United Kingdom
- Languages: French; English; German

The Convention Relative to the Preservation of Fauna and Flora in their Natural State, also known as the London Convention of 1933, was an early agreement among colonial powers for the conservation of nature. As one of the first general conservation agreements in Africa, and the first to specifically protect a plant species, it has been called the Magna Carta of wildlife conservation and "the high point of institutionalized global nature protection before the Second World War".

== Political process ==
The Convention was the result of the 1933 International Conference for the Protection of the Fauna and Flora of Africa, presided over by Richard Onslow, 5th Earl of Onslow, then president of the Society for the Preservation of the Wild Fauna of the Empire. It was based on the London Convention of 1900, which had been agreed to but never came into force due to a lack of ratifications.

Signatories of the 1933 convention were Belgium, Egypt, France, Italy, the Anglo-Egyptian Sudan, the Union of South Africa and the United Kingdom and its dependencies. All but France and Spain ratified the agreement in 1935, and British India acceded partially in 1939. In 1950, it was ratified by Portugal and in 1963, then-independent Tanganyika acceded to the convention.

The 1933 London Convention was superseded by the African Convention on the Conservation of Nature and Natural Resources in 1968.

== Obligations ==
The Convention obligated signatories to establish parks and reserves and limit human settlement therein, domesticate useful animals, and prohibit unsportsmanlike methods of take. It also required states to give special protection to a list of species.

=== Species protected ===
The Convention bestowed varying degrees of protection on two classes of species.

==== Class A ====
The 17 mammals, three birds and one plant species in Class A are to be hunted or otherwise killed only by special permission that was to be granted exclusively for scientific research or other critical purposes.

- Gorilla (all species)
- Madagascar lemurs Cheirogaleidae, Lemuridae and Indriidae
- Aardwolf
- Fossa
- Giant sable antelope
- Nyala
- Mountain nyala
- Okapi
- Barbary stag
- Pygmy hippopotamus
- Mountain zebra
- Wild ass
- White rhinoceros
- †Bubal hartebeest
- Walia ibex
- Elephant (with tusks under 5 kg each)
- Water chevrotain
- Shoebill
- Northern bald ibis
- White-breasted guineafowl
- Welwitschia

==== Class B ====
Authorization for hunting the animals in Class B is allowable by special permit, but for any purpose.

- Chimpanzee
- Colobus monkey
- Giant eland
- Giraffe
- White-tailed gnu
- Duiker (yellow-backed and Jentink's)
- Beira
- Dibatag
- Bontebok
- Black rhinoceros
- Elephant (with tusks over kg)
- Pangolin
- Marabou
- Ground hornbill (Abyssinian and southern)
- Ostrich
- Secretary bird
- Egrets (little, intermediate and great)
