= Maiko National Park =

National park in the Democratic Republic of the Congo

Maiko National Park Parc national de la Maiko
- IUCN category II (national park)
- Location within Democratic Republic of the Congo
- Location: Democratic Republic of the Congo
- Nearest city: Kisangani
- Coordinates: 0°24′S 27°34′E
- Area: 10,885 km^{2} (4,203 sq mi)
- Established: 1970
- Governing body: Institut Congolais pour la Conservation de la Nature
- Website: WDPA 1080

Maiko National Park (French: Parc national de la Maïko) is a national park in the east of the Democratic Republic of the Congo.

== History ==
=== Establishment ===
In 1949, the Belgian colonial administration created the Bakumu Hunting Reserve (Bakumu, meaning "The Kumus", the native tribe in the region) on an area that would later encompass the boundaries of the Park as we know it today. The original plans were aimed at preventing the exploitation of mineral resources rather than nature and wildlife protection.

On 20 November 1970, Presidential Decree no 70-312, which is bound to the law that had created the ICCN the previous year, was signed into force by Joseph Désiré Mobutu. This document asserted the Maiko National Park to be a full-fledged nature protection area.

=== The rebel problem ===
The remoteness and inaccessibility of Maiko National Park rendered the region ideal for Simba rebels to retreat after their defeat in 1964. Ever since, they have been making a meager living by poaching on wildlife and controlling illegal mining activities inside of the national park. The presence of the Simba also stems from the inability of the governing bodies to follow the compensatory measures required by the decree of 1970.

This precarious security situation has made it difficult for the rangers to patrol the Park, especially after the ICCN was coerced by the Congolese army into guiding their attacks towards the Simba. Conservation work has been hampered by the presence of rebels, culminating in the capture and detention of several survey crews between 2003 and 2005. At least three other groups of rebels are known to be active in different parts of the park, including the Rwandan Interahamwe in the east. This resulted in a complete lack of control over the park area by the ICCN.

=== International conservation efforts ===
The first thorough exploration of the Maiko dates back to 1989, when the Wildlife Conservation Society, backed by the ICCN (then ZICN), with support from the World Bank, the European Community and the WWF, moved into the area and surveyed about 950 km of transect.

WCS further surveyed the North Sector in 2005. The Dian Fossey Gorilla fund conducted the first surveys of the southern sector of the park for over a decade in 2005, and documented a gorilla population more widespread than previously detected from previous studies.

WCS surveyed an additional block in the South Sector in 2006. These surveys, combined revealed that Maiko is highly threatened yet supports an important reservoir of endemic and rare species.

=== 2010 survey ===
A more recent survey focussed on the forests west and south of the park in 2010. It revealed that threats had intensified since 2005; it also documented the extinction of one of the new gorilla subpopulations documented in the 2005 surveys. All observations pointed to the intense hunting pressure caused by miners and the widespread use of guns, as serious threats to the remaining animal populations.

A new approach to conservation has been the implementation of compensation measures for the Simbas willing to leave the Park. In 2010, FFI initiated the construction of health centers and schools for villages in the region falling under the influence of the Simbas. The same year FZS launched an ambitious project aiming at rehabilitating some Simbas by recruiting them as park rangers and allowing a de facto social reintegration which would directly benefit nature conservation in Maiko.

== Geography and environment ==
The park lies in one of the most remote forested areas of Congo DRC and covers 10,885 km^{2} (4,203 mi^{2}). It is divided into three sectors, straddling the states of Nord Kivu, Province Orientale and Maniema. It contains tropical primary forest bordered by many rivers. The northern sector forms the southern part of the Ituri Rainforest. The eastern sector is relatively flat, with an elevation of about 1,000 m, as far as the Lindi River. Farther east, the elevation increases. Several rivers rise in the hills to the north, east and south. The vegetation is tall, closed, evergreen lowland rainforest, with patches of secondary forest around settlements. Rainfall is high, reaching a maximum in October and November, with a drier season in July and August.

=== Wildlife ===
Three of the country's iconic endemic animals occur in the park: Grauer's gorilla, the okapi and Congo peafowl. Maiko is also an important site for the conservation of the African forest elephant, eastern chimpanzee and the endemic aquatic genet. It has been designated an Important Bird Area (IBA) by BirdLife International because it supports significant populations of many bird species.

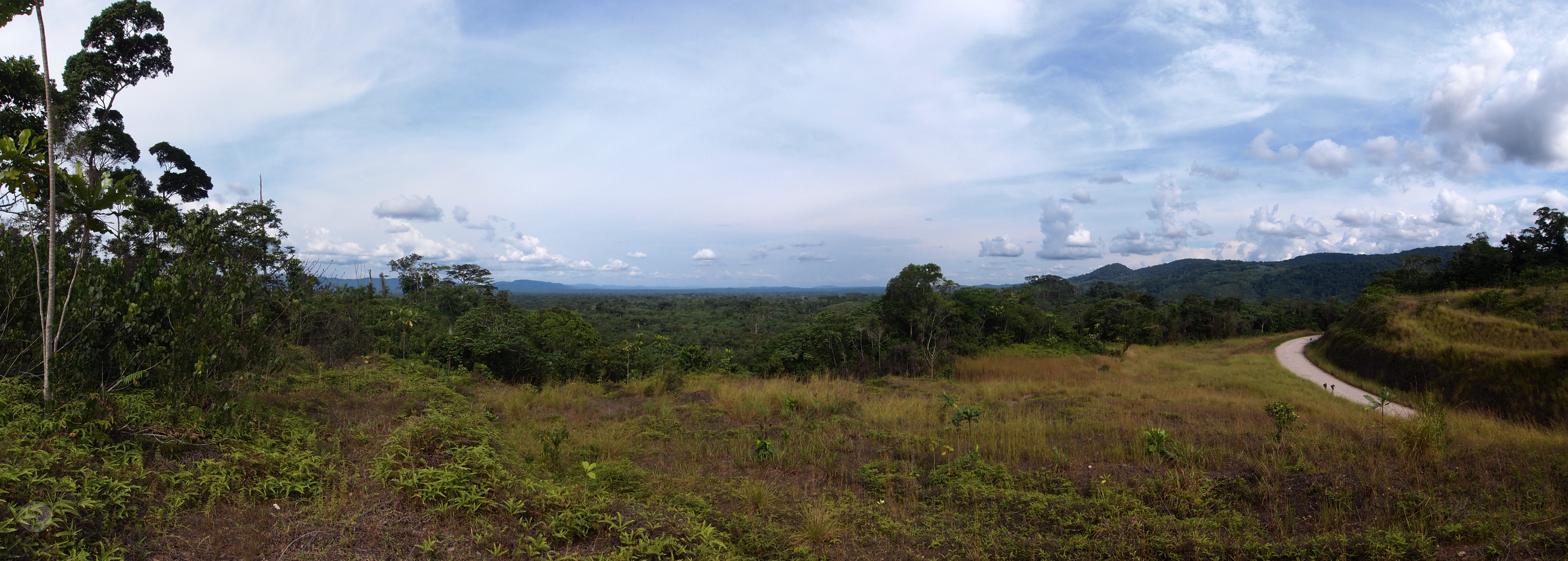
Landscape of the southern end of Maiko National Park.
