= Mangroves National Park =

National park & wetland in the Democratic Republic of the Congo

Mangroves National Park Réserve marine de Muanda
- IUCN category II (national park)
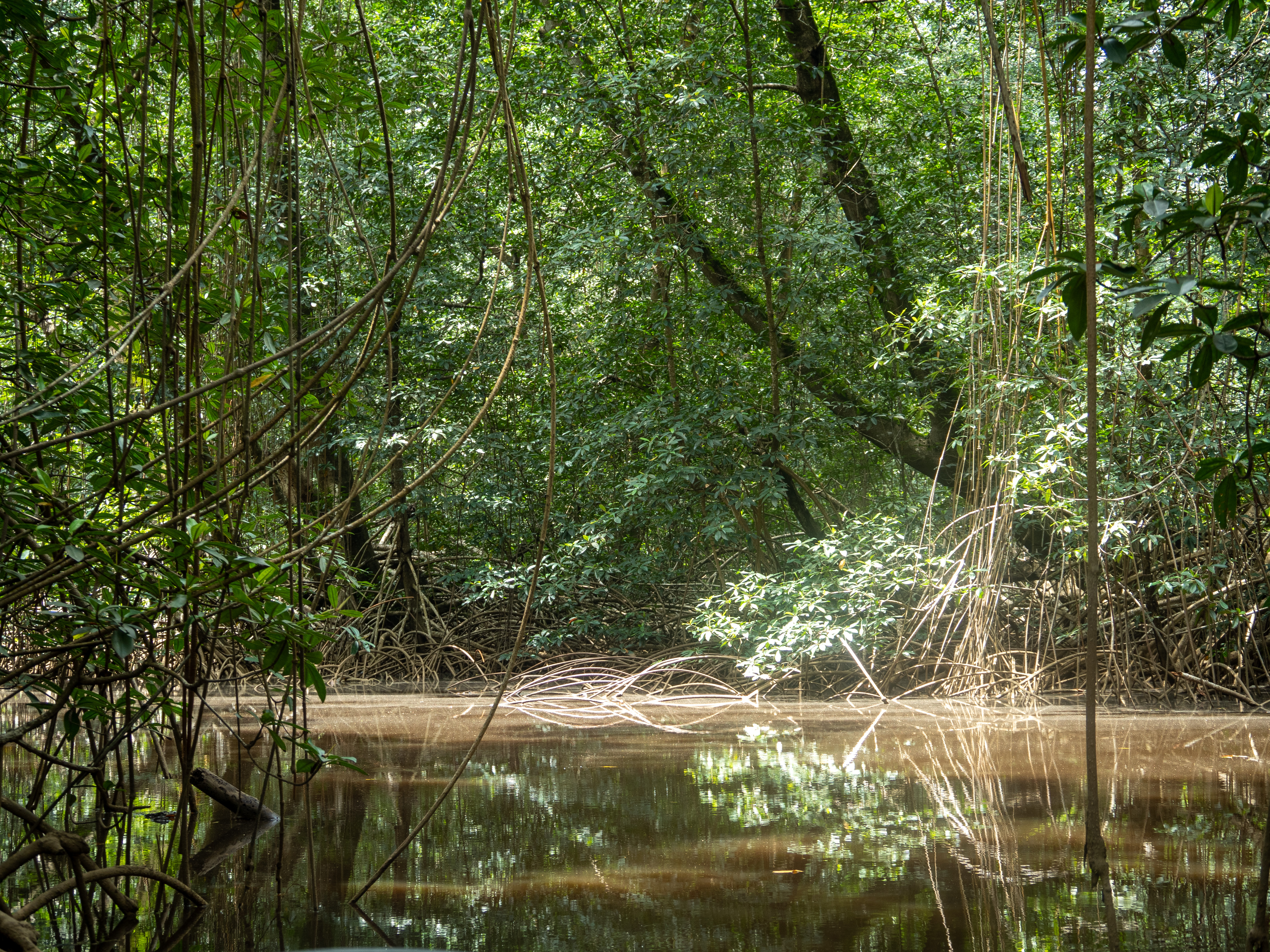

- Location within Democratic Republic of the Congo
- Location: Democratic Republic of the Congo
- Coordinates: 5°45′S 12°45′E
- Area: 768 km^{2} (297 sq mi)
- Established: 1992
- Governing body: Institut Congolais pour la Conservation de la Nature

Ramsar Wetland
- Official name: Parc national des Mangroves
- Designated: 18 January 1996
- Reference no.: 788

Mangroves National Park (also French: Parc marin des Mangroves or Muanda Marine Reserve) is a protected area and Ramsar wetland in the Democratic Republic of the Congo. It is the country's only marine park and is notable for its mangrove forests. It provides protection to the endangered manatee population situated at the mouth of the Congo River. These mangroves are distinct from the ones found in South Asia. They form a separate type of mangrove forests, which are typical to the Democratic Republic of Congo. The park was established in 1992.

== Geography ==
At 768 km^{2} (297 mi^{2}) in size, the park is DR Congo's smallest protected area.

== Flora and fauna ==
In addition to the manatee, the area supports hippopotamuses, crocodiles, snakes, and southern reedbuck. The bushbuck may also be present.

Mangrove species present include Rhizophora racemosa, Rhizophora mangle, Avicennia nitida, Avicennia germinans and Laguncularia racemosa. Other flora include Hibiscus tiliaceus and Acrostichum aureum.
