= Lomako-Yokokala Nature Reserve =

- Réserve naturelle de Lomako-Yokokala
- Location within Democratic Republic of the Congo
- Location: Bas-Uélé and Tshuapa provinces, Democratic Republic of the Congo.
- Coordinates: 0.9779°N 21.1781°E
- Area: 3,601.88 km^{2} (1,390.69 sq mi)
- Designation: Nature reserve
- Designated: 2006
- Administrator: Institut Congolais pour la Conservation de la Nature

Lomako-Yokokala Nature Reserve is a protected area in the Democratic Republic of the Congo. It covers portions of Bas-Uélé and Tshuapa provinces. It was established in 1991 especially to protect the habitat of the Bonobo apes. This site covers 3,601.88 km^{2}.
