= Kobus (given name) =

Kobus or Cobus is a Dutch and now primarily Afrikaans masculine given name, a short form (hypocorism) of the given name Jacobus. People with this name include:

== South African rugby union players ==
- Kobus de Kock (born 1988)
- Cobus Grobbelaar (born 1981)
- Kobus Marais (born 1994)
- Cobus Reinach (born 1990)
- Kobus Van Deventer (born 1995)
- Kobus van Dyk (born 1994)
- Kobus van Wyk (born 1992)
- Cobus Visagie (born 1973)
- Kobus Wiese (born 1964)
- Cobus Wiese (born 1997)

== Others ==
- Kobus Brand (born 1994), Namibian cricketer
- Cobus de Swardt, South African sociologist
- Kobus Jonker, South African paralympic athlete
- Cobus Kellermann, South African financial analyst
- Kobus Moolman, South African poet
- Kobus Marais, South African politician
- Cobus Pienaar (born 1985), South African cricketer
- Kobus van der Schlossen (died 1695), Dutch legendary thief
- Kobus Vandenberg (born 1950), Dutch sports sailor
