= Bamboo forest =

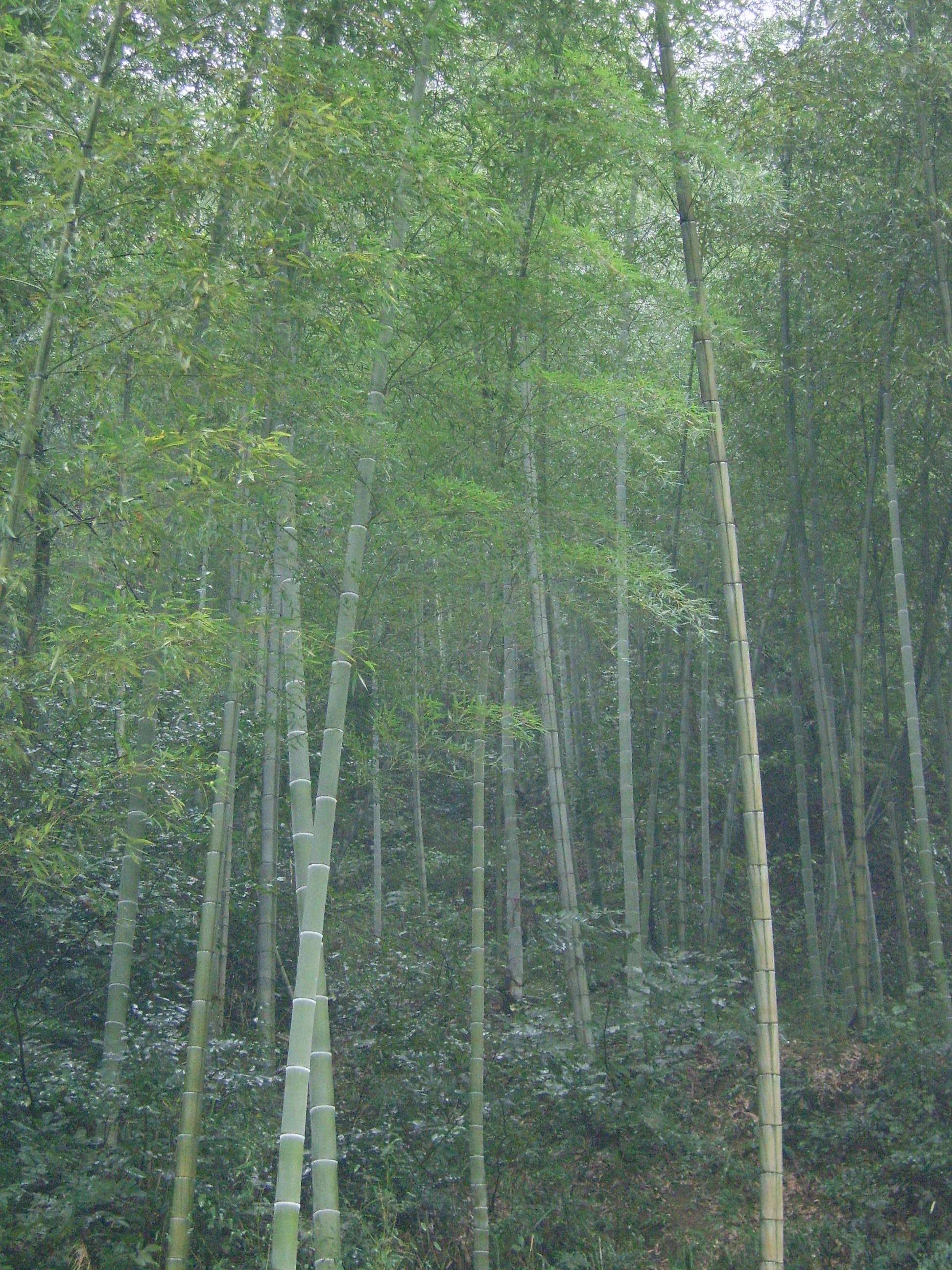
A bamboo forest made up of moso bamboo

The term bamboo forests is commonly used for bamboo plant communities even though bamboo is a grass, not a tree. Definitions of bamboo forests vary by country and may be contradictory.

== Overview ==
Bamboos often create communities that are almost entirely composed of a single species unlike other forests. Bamboos also differ from ordinary trees both in appearance and characteristics like having trunks that are sturdy but do not grow thick. Bamboos grow quickly and abundantly, often preventing sunlight from touching the ground, making conditions difficult for other plants to grow in bamboo forests which is why one will only see bamboo shoots in these forests and rarely any other type of vegetation. and creating a unique landscape of dense bamboo.

=== Human uses ===
Bamboo is used in various ways as a valuable natural material in many Asian countries. As such, bamboo forests are seen as a vital source to create tools and resources that are important to the livelihood of these communities.

When bamboo forests are managed with moderate extraction, they have the ability of deterring landslides or erosions in the event of an earthquake or other natural disasters.

== Preventing deforestation ==
Bamboos have a very strong reproductive capacity which can be seen in how fast they can regrow after being cut down. Within 2 to 3 months of being cut, a bamboo shoot can grow into a full-grown specimen and quickly cover the land with many shoots. This is the reason why some say that when you cut a bamboo shoot, you are planting a bamboo shoot in its place. The underground stem of bamboo is shallow and spreads near the surface of the ground, and the underground stem is covered with “whisker roots,” which hold the ground and the area firmly in place.

The spread of alternative materials to make different tools and objects has led to some regional bamboo forests to be mismanaged and left in poor states. The expansion of these neglected bamboo forests puts pressure on other plants by reducing the biodiversity in many of these regions and can also lead to natural disasters having bigger impact on communities. For this reason, some places are taking steps to cut down bamboo forests all together and replace them with forests that are more permanent and will not need as much maintenance or protection as bamboo.

== Sources ==
- Lobovikov, Maxim; Paudel, Shyam; Piazza, Marco; Ren, Hong; Wu, Junqi (2007). World Bamboo Resources: A Thematic Study Prepared in the Framework of the Global Forest Resources Assessment 2005. Non-wood forest products. Food and Agriculture Organization of the United Nations. ISBN 978-92-5-105781-0.
