= Outline of the Democratic Republic of the Congo =

Overview of and topical guide to the Democratic Republic of the Congo

The Flag of the Democratic Republic of the Congo

The Coat of arms of the Democratic Republic of the Congo

The location of the Democratic Republic of the Congo

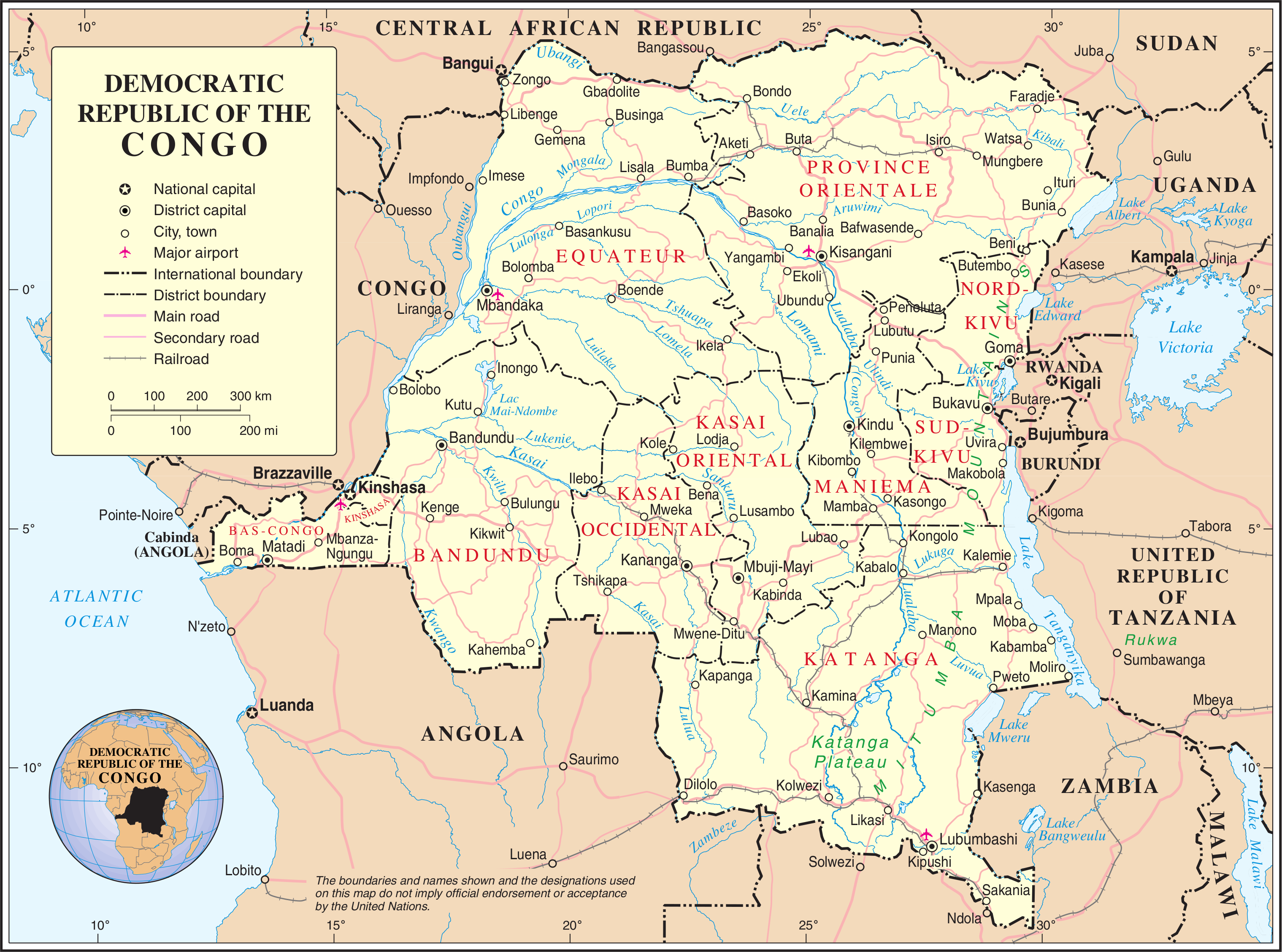
An enlargeable map of the Democratic Republic of the Congo

The following outline is provided as an overview of and topical guide to the Democratic Republic of the Congo:

Democratic Republic of the Congo – country located in Central Africa. The country is extremely rich in natural resources but political instability, a lack of infrastructure and a culture of corruption have historically limited development, extraction and exploitation efforts. Besides the capital, Kinshasa, the country's other largest cities are both mining communities (Lubumbashi and Mbuji-Mayi) and the country's largest exports are raw minerals.

== General reference ==
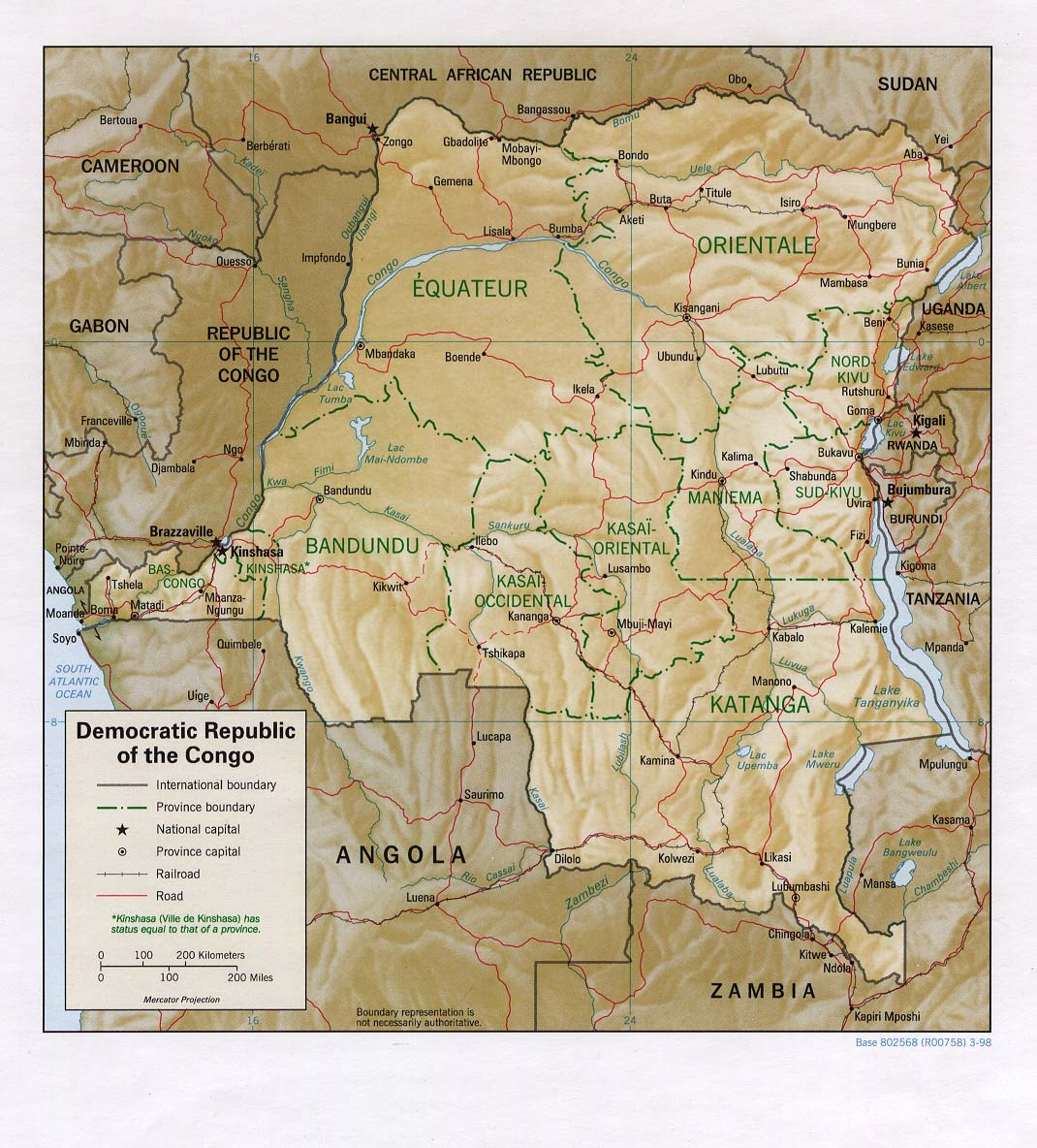
An enlargeable relief map of the Democratic Republic of the Congo

- Pronunciation: /ˈkɒŋɡoʊ/
- Common English country names: The Democratic Republic of the Congo, Congo-Kinshasa, Zaire
- Official English country name: The Democratic Republic of the Congo
- Adjectives: Congolese, Congo
- Demonym(s): Congolese
- ISO country codes: CD, COD, 180
- ISO region codes: See ISO 3166-2:CD
- Internet country code top-level domain: .cd

== Geography of the Democratic Republic of the Congo ==
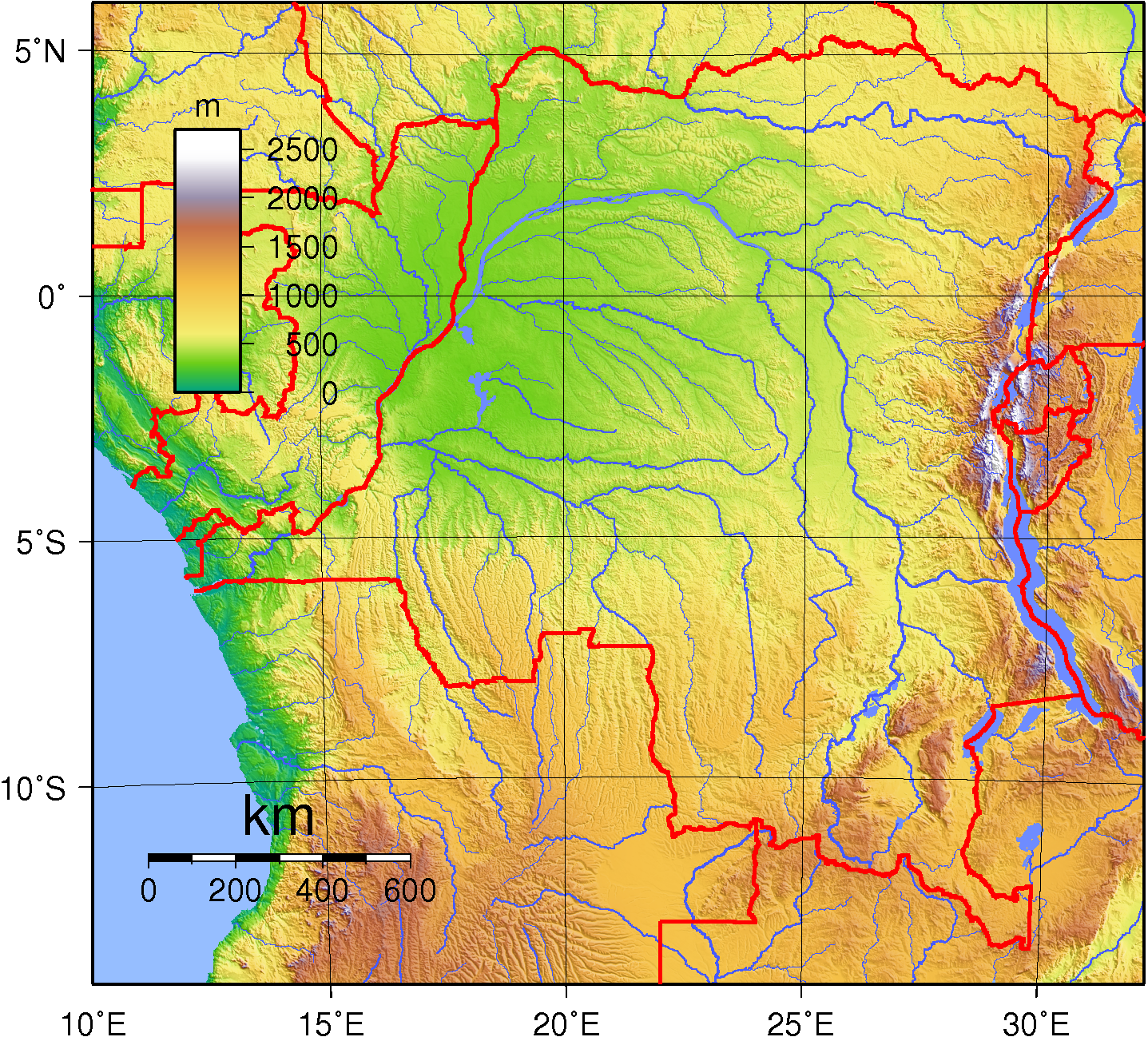
An enlargeable topographic map of the Democratic Republic of the Congo

- The Democratic Republic of the Congo is: an equatorial megadiverse country
- Location:
  - Eastern Hemisphere, on the Equator
  - Africa
    - Central Africa
    - Middle Africa
  - Time zones:
    - West Africa Time (UTC+01)
    - Central Africa Time (UTC+02)
  - Extreme points of the Democratic Republic of the Congo
    - High: Margherita Peak 5,109 m (16,762 ft)
    - Low: South Atlantic Ocean 0 m
  - Land boundaries: 10,730 km

Angola 2,511 km
Republic of the Congo 2,410 km
Zambia 1,930 km
Central African Republic 1,577 km
Uganda 765 km
South Sudan 628 km
Tanzania 459 km
Burundi 233 km
Rwanda 217 km

- Coastline: Gulf of Guinea 37 km

- Population of the Democratic Republic of the Congo:
- Area of the Democratic Republic of the Congo:
- Atlas of the Democratic Republic of the Congo

=== Environment of the Democratic Republic of the Congo ===
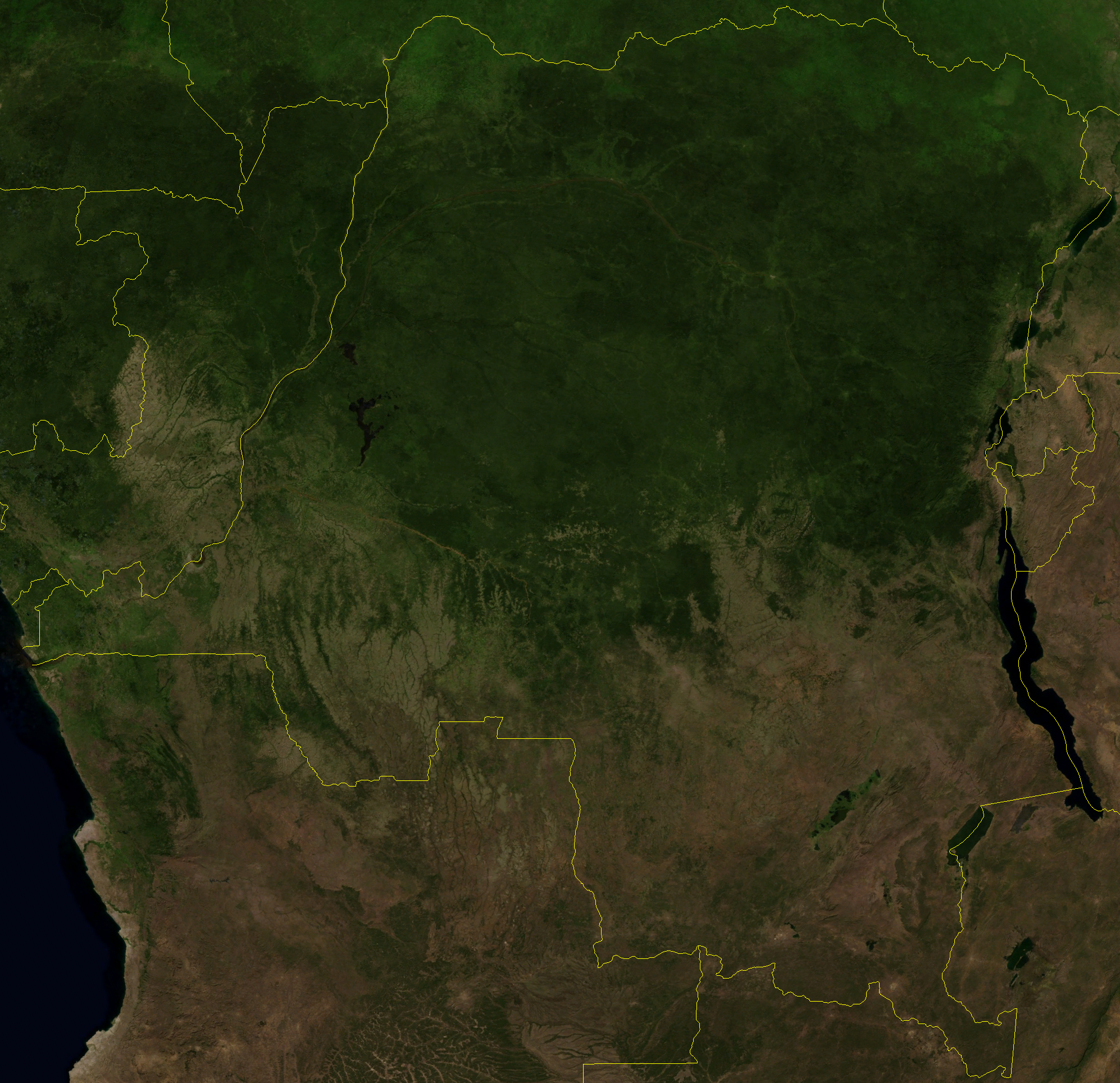
An enlargeable satellite image of the Democratic Republic of the Congo

- Climate of the Democratic Republic of the Congo
- Ecoregions in the Democratic Republic of the Congo
- Renewable energy in the Democratic Republic of the Congo
- Protected areas of the Democratic Republic of the Congo
  - Biosphere reserves in the Democratic Republic of the Congo
- Wildlife of the Democratic Republic of the Congo
  - Fauna of the Democratic Republic of the Congo
    - Amphibians of the Democratic Republic of the Congo
    - Birds of the Democratic Republic of the Congo
    - Mammals of the Democratic Republic of the Congo
    - Reptiles of the Democratic Republic of the Congo

==== Natural geographic features of the Democratic Republic of the Congo ====
- Lakes of the Democratic Republic of the Congo
- Mountains of the Democratic Republic of the Congo
  - Volcanoes in the Democratic Republic of the Congo
- Rivers of the Democratic Republic of the Congo
- World Heritage Sites in the Democratic Republic of the Congo

=== Regions of the Democratic Republic of the Congo ===
==== Ecoregions of the Democratic Republic of the Congo ====
List of ecoregions in the Democratic Republic of the Congo

==== Administrative divisions of the Democratic Republic of the Congo ====
Administrative divisions of the Democratic Republic of the Congo

- Provinces of the Democratic Republic of the Congo
  - Territories of the Democratic Republic of the Congo
  - Chiefdoms and sectors of the Democratic Republic of the Congo

===== Provinces of the Democratic Republic of the Congo =====
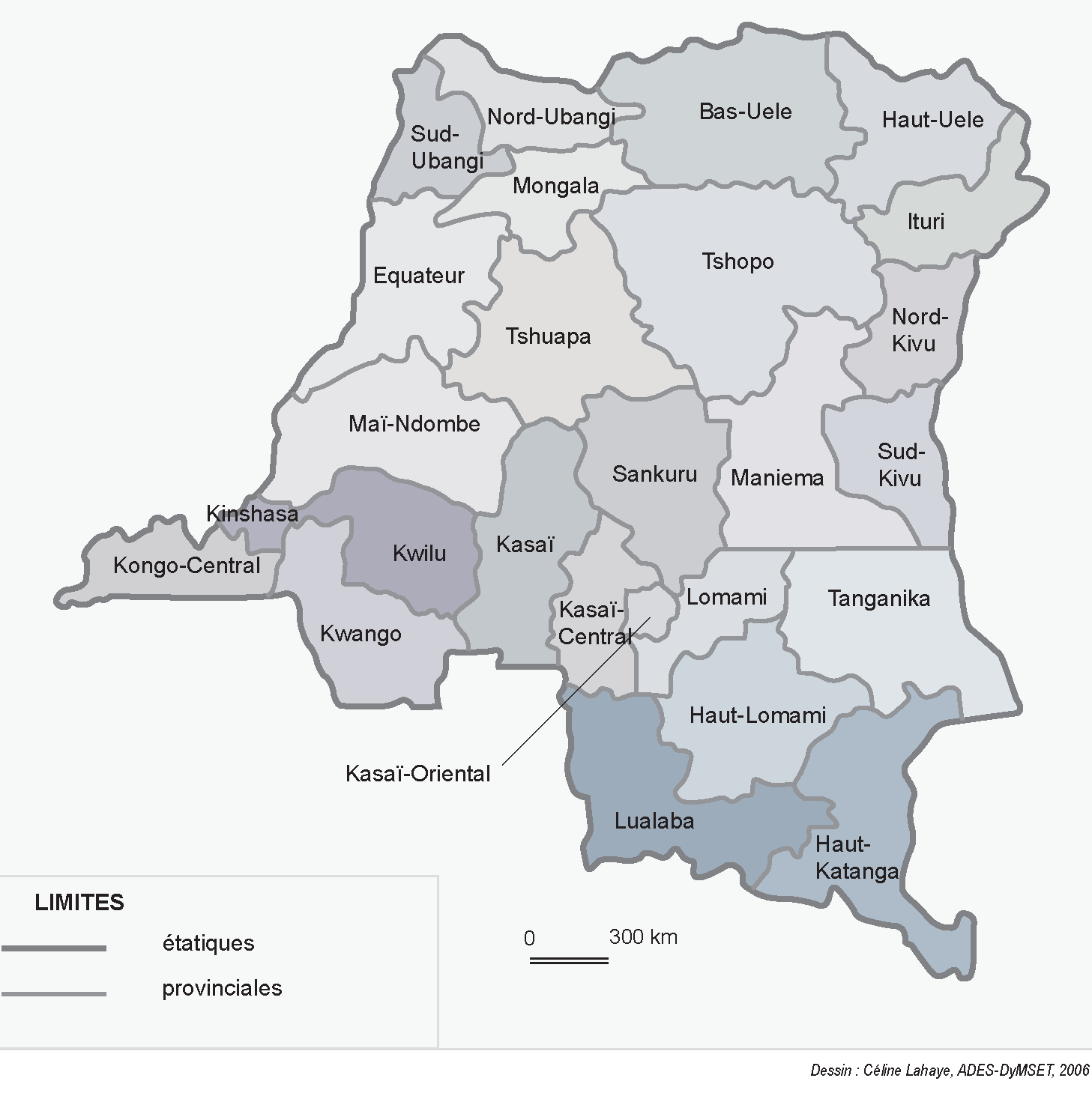

Province	Capital
Bas-Uélé	Buta
Équateur	Mbandaka
Haut-Katanga	Lubumbashi
Haut-Lomami	Kamina
Haut-Uélé	Isiro
Ituri	Bunia
Kasaï	Tshikapa
Kasaï-Central	Kananga
Kasaï-Oriental	Mbuji-Mayi
Kinshasa	Kinshasa
Kongo Central	Matadi
Kwango	Kenge
Kwilu	Bandundu
Lomami	Kabinda
Lualaba	Kolwezi
Mai-Ndombe	Inongo
Maniema	Kindu
Mongala	Lisala
North Kivu	Goma
Nord-Ubangi	Gbadolite
Sankuru	Lusambo
South Kivu	Bukavu
Sud-Ubangi	Gemena
Tanganyika	Kalemie
Tshopo	Kisangani
Tshuapa	Boende

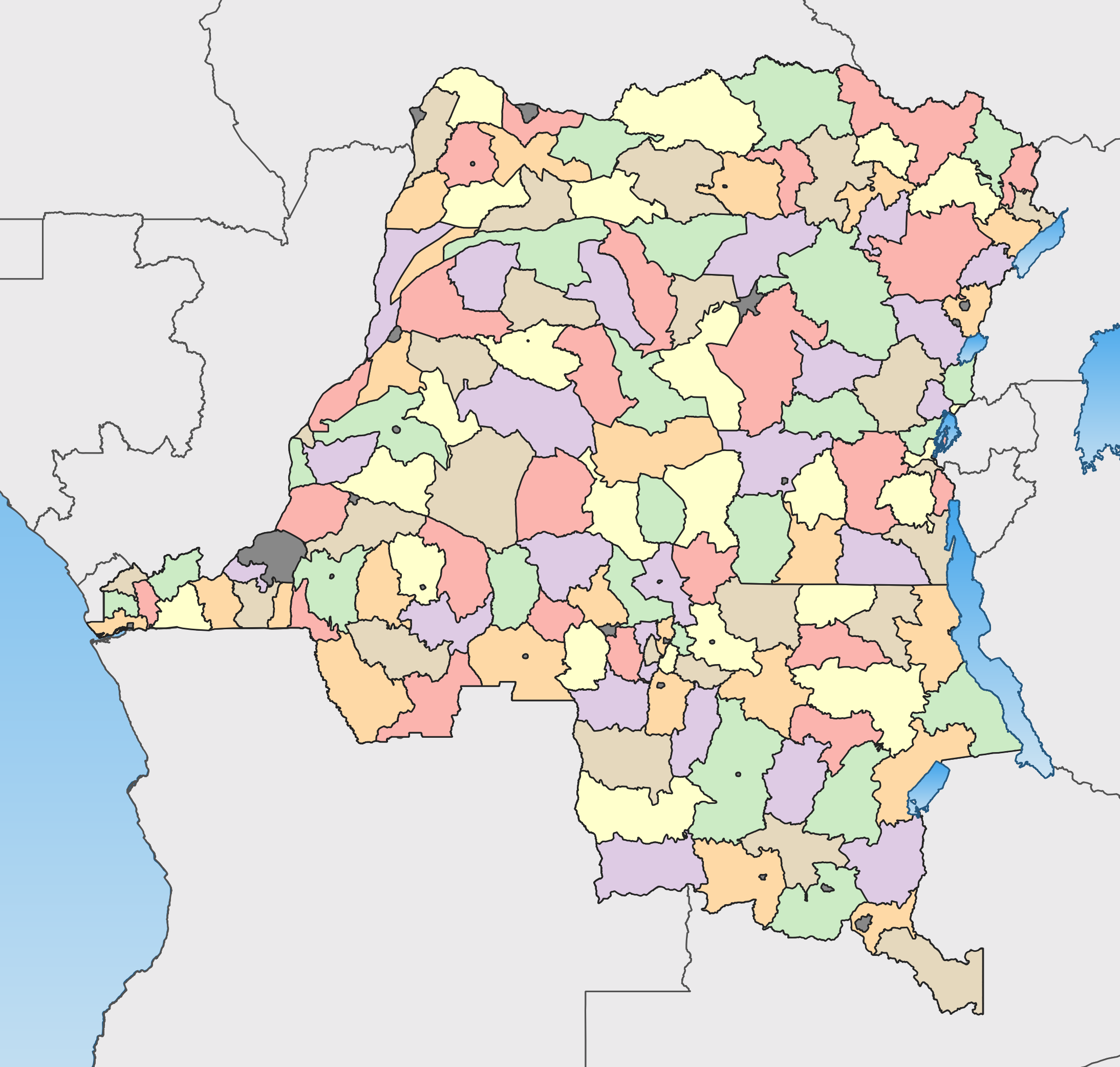
Territories of the Democratic Republic of the Congo

- Capital of the Democratic Republic of the Congo: Kinshasa
- Cities of the Democratic Republic of the Congo

== Government and politics of the Democratic Republic of the Congo ==
Politics of the Democratic Republic of the Congo

- Form of government: semi-presidential democratic republic
- Capital of the Democratic Republic of the Congo: Kinshasa
- Elections in the Democratic Republic of the Congo
- Political parties in the Democratic Republic of the Congo

=== Branches of the government of the Democratic Republic of the Congo ===
Government of the Democratic Republic of the Congo

==== Executive branch of the government of the Democratic Republic of the Congo ====
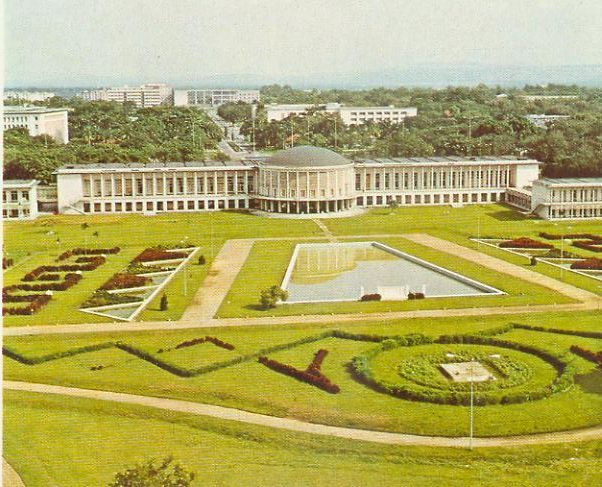
Palais de la Nation

- Head of state: President of the Democratic Republic of the Congo, Félix Tshisekedi
- Head of government: Prime Minister of the Democratic Republic of the Congo, Judith Suminwa

==== Legislative branch of the government of the Democratic Republic of the Congo ====
- Parliament of the Democratic Republic of the Congo (bicameral)
  - Upper house: Senate of the Democratic Republic of the Congo
  - Lower house: National Assembly of the Democratic Republic of the Congo

==== Judicial branch of the government of the Democratic Republic of the Congo ====
Court system of the Democratic Republic of the Congo

=== Foreign relations of the Democratic Republic of the Congo ===
Foreign relations of the Democratic Republic of the Congo

- Diplomatic missions in the Democratic Republic of the Congo
- Diplomatic missions of the Democratic Republic of the Congo

==== International organization membership ====
The Democratic Republic of the Congo is a member of:

- African, Caribbean, and Pacific Group of States (ACP)
- African Development Bank Group (AfDB)
- African Union (AU)
- Common Market for Eastern and Southern Africa (COMESA)
- Economic Community of the Great Lakes Countries (CEPGL)
- Food and Agriculture Organization (FAO)
- Group of 24 (G24)
- Group of 77 (G77)
- International Atomic Energy Agency (IAEA)
- International Bank for Reconstruction and Development (IBRD)
- International Civil Aviation Organization (ICAO)
- International Criminal Court (ICCt)
- International Criminal Police Organization (Interpol)
- International Development Association (IDA)
- International Federation of Red Cross and Red Crescent Societies (IFRCS)
- International Finance Corporation (IFC)
- International Fund for Agricultural Development (IFAD)
- International Hydrographic Organization (IHO) (suspended)
- International Labour Organization (ILO)
- International Maritime Organization (IMO)
- International Monetary Fund (IMF)
- International Olympic Committee (IOC)
- International Organization for Migration (IOM)
- International Organization for Standardization (ISO)
- International Red Cross and Red Crescent Movement (ICRM)
- International Telecommunication Union (ITU)
- International Telecommunications Satellite Organization (ITSO)
- International Trade Union Confederation (ITUC)
- Inter-Parliamentary Union (IPU)
- Multilateral Investment Guarantee Agency (MIGA)
- Nonaligned Movement (NAM)
- Organisation internationale de la Francophonie (OIF)
- Organisation for the Prohibition of Chemical Weapons (OPCW)
- Permanent Court of Arbitration (PCA)
- Southern African Development Community (SADC)
- United Nations (UN)
- United Nations Conference on Trade and Development (UNCTAD)
- United Nations Educational, Scientific, and Cultural Organization (UNESCO)
- United Nations High Commissioner for Refugees (UNHCR)
- United Nations Industrial Development Organization (UNIDO)
- Universal Postal Union (UPU)
- World Confederation of Labour (WCL)
- World Customs Organization (WCO)
- World Federation of Trade Unions (WFTU)
- World Health Organization (WHO)
- World Intellectual Property Organization (WIPO)
- World Meteorological Organization (WMO)
- World Tourism Organization (UNWTO)
- World Trade Organization (WTO)

=== Law and order in the Democratic Republic of the Congo ===
Law of the Democratic Republic of the Congo

- Constitution of the Democratic Republic of the Congo
- Crime in the Democratic Republic of the Congo
  - Sexual violence in the Democratic Republic of the Congo
- Human rights in the Democratic Republic of the Congo
  - LGBT rights in the Democratic Republic of the Congo
  - Freedom of religion in the Democratic Republic of the Congo
  - Women in the Democratic Republic of the Congo
- Law enforcement in the Democratic Republic of the Congo

=== Military of the Democratic Republic of the Congo ===
Military of the Democratic Republic of the Congo

- Command
  - Commander-in-chief:
- Forces
  - Land Forces of the Democratic Republic of the Congo
  - Navy of the Democratic Republic of the Congo
  - Air Force of the Democratic Republic of the Congo
  - Republican Guard of the Democratic Republic of the Congo

== History of the Democratic Republic of the Congo ==
=== History by period ===
- Pre-colonial history

=== History by region ===
- History of the Kasai region
- History of Katanga
- History of Kinshasa

=== History by subject ===
- Economic history of the Democratic Republic of the Congo
- History of the Jews in the Democratic Republic of the Congo
- Postage stamps and postal history of the Democratic Republic of the Congo

== Culture of the Democratic Republic of the Congo ==
Traditional dance performance of the Alur people

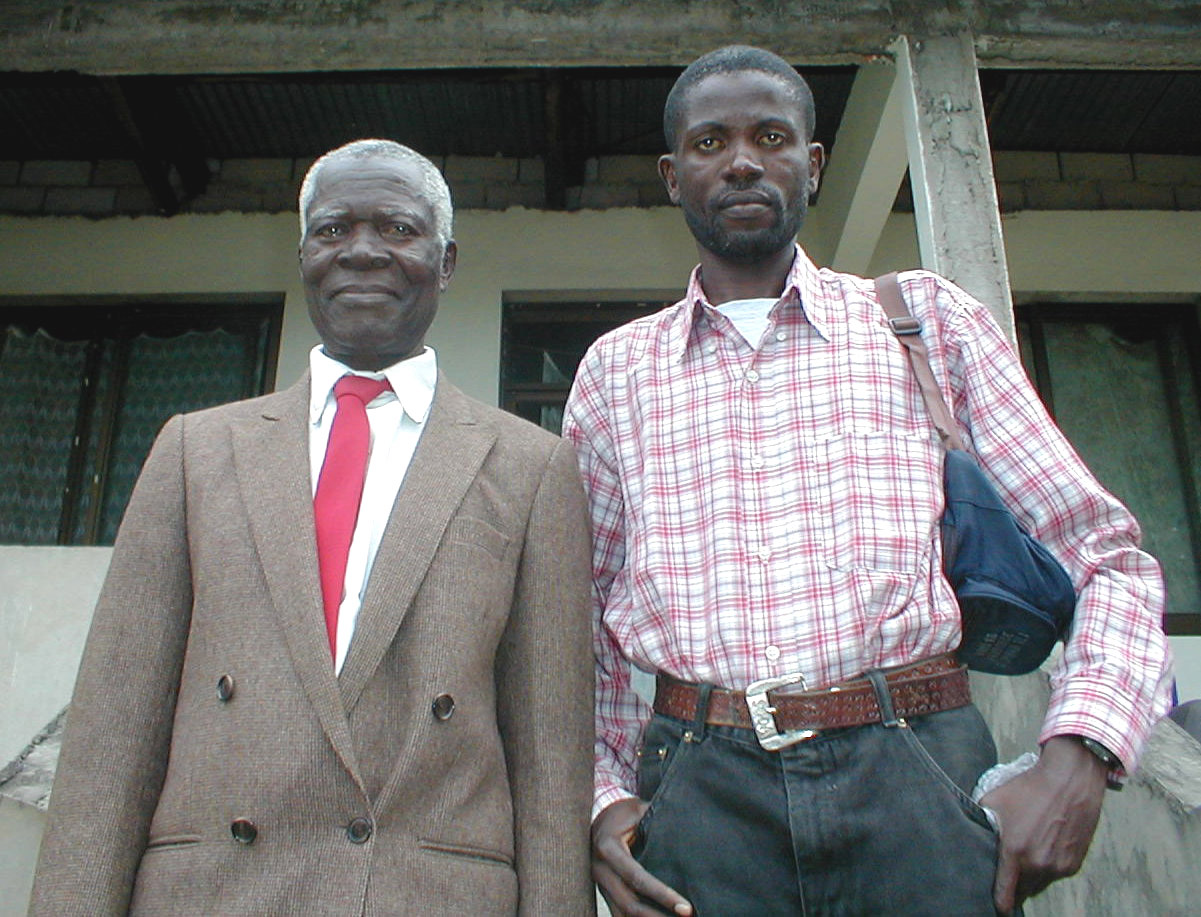
Traditional and contemporary Congolese fashion

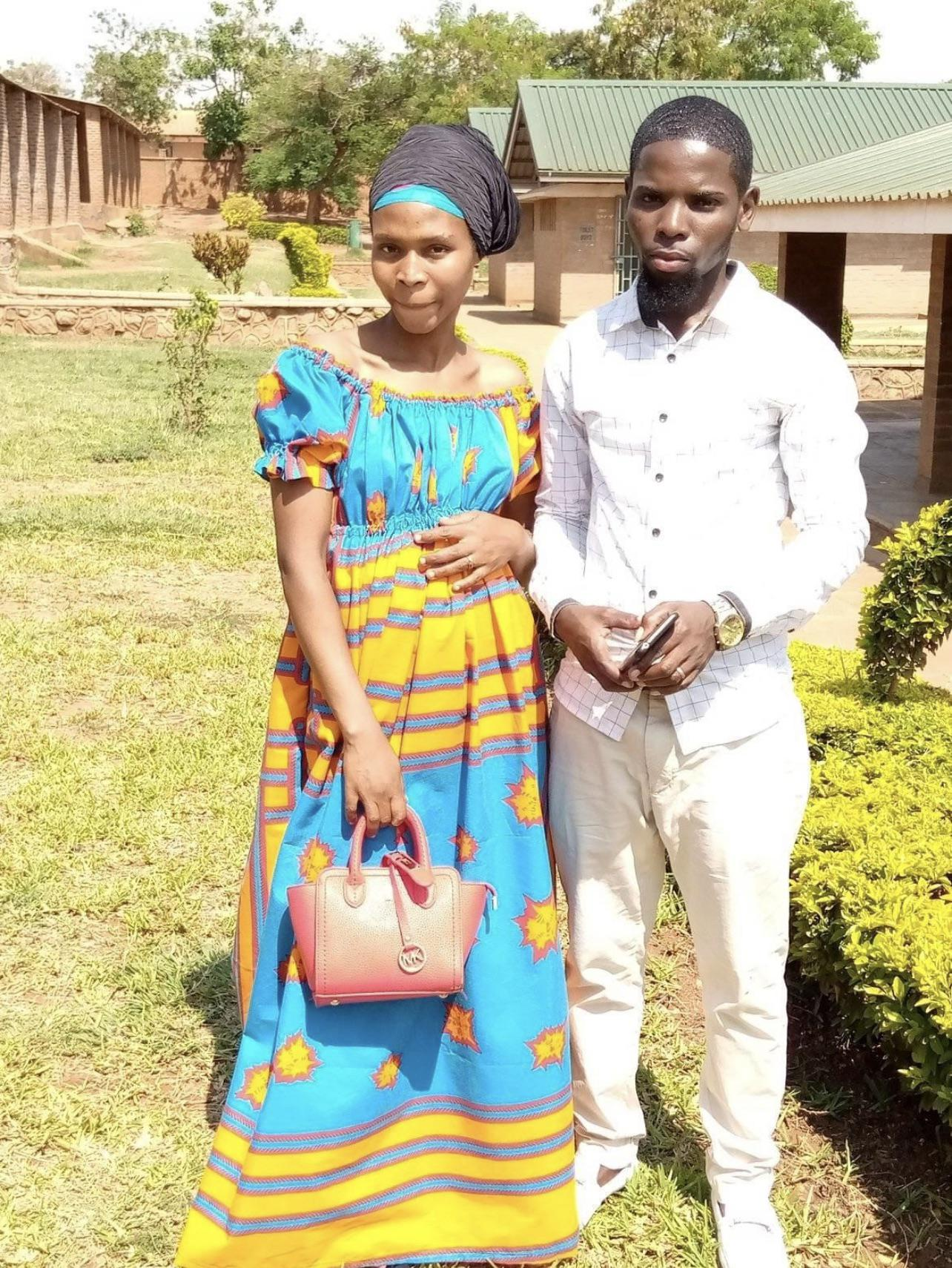
Fuliiru couples in traditional ceremonial attire

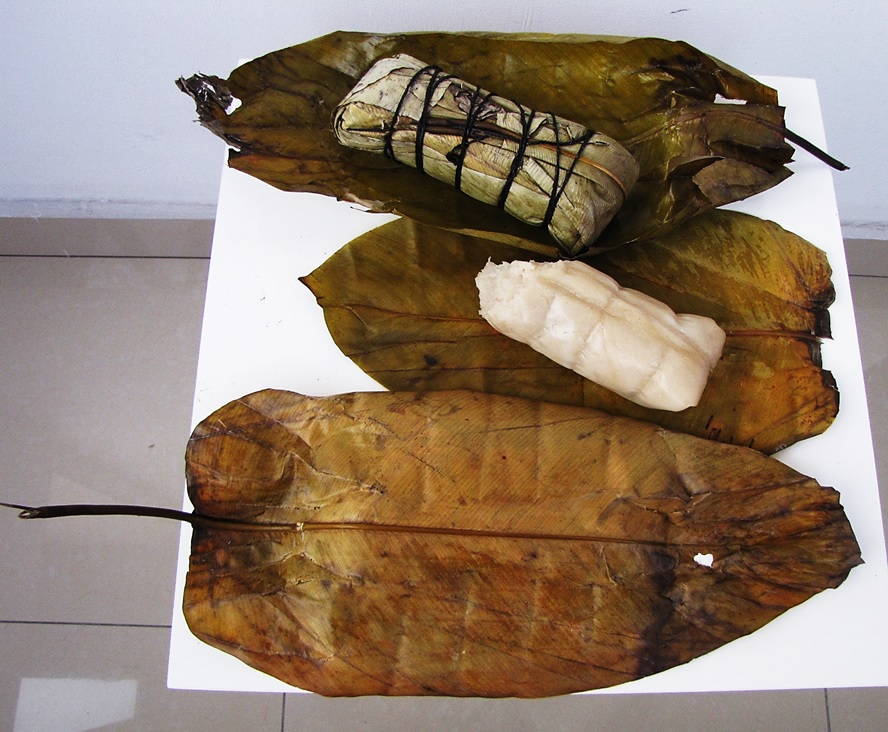
Chikwangue (cassava bread wrapped in leaves), a national staple

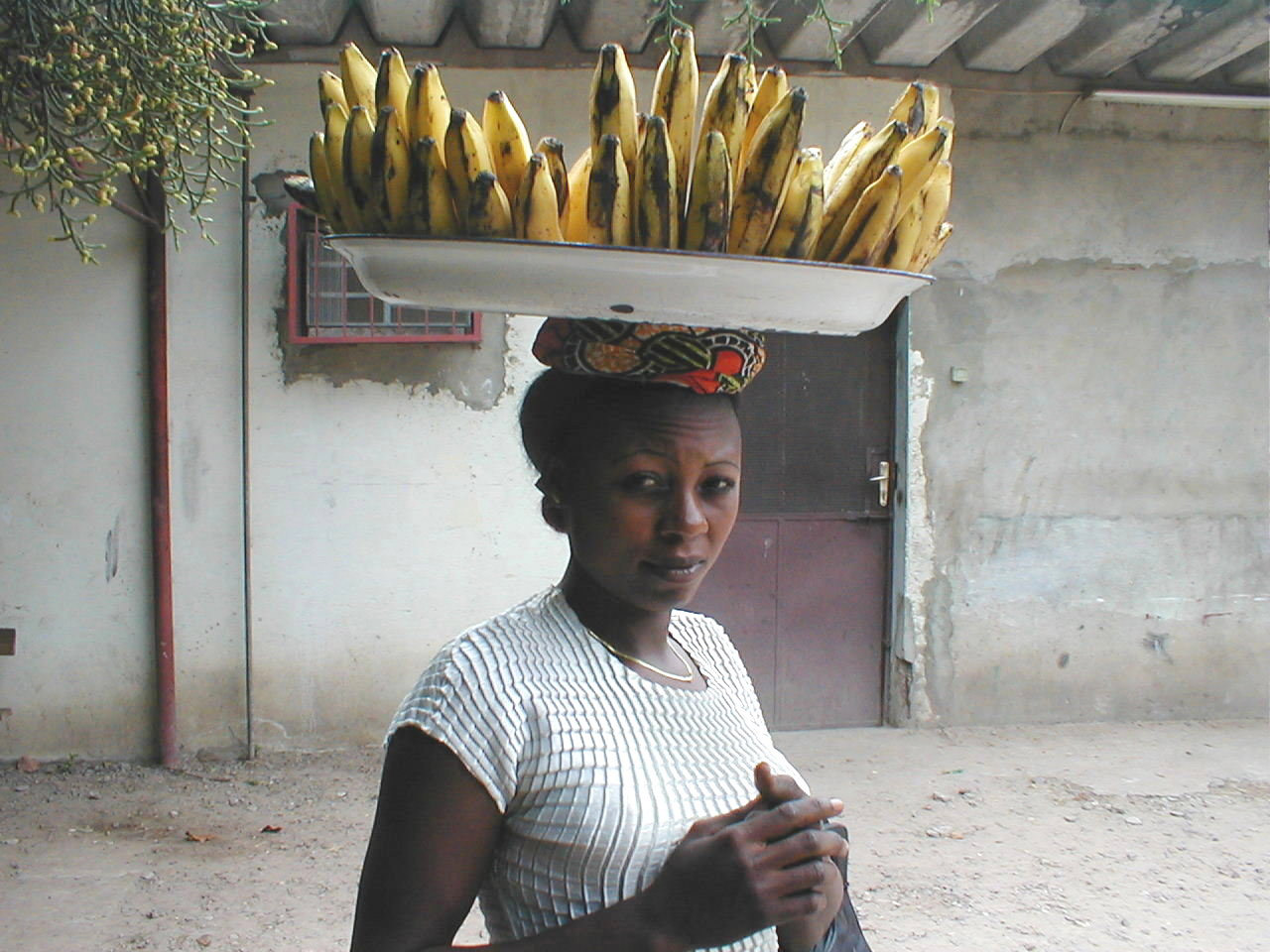
Local agricultural produce and market culture

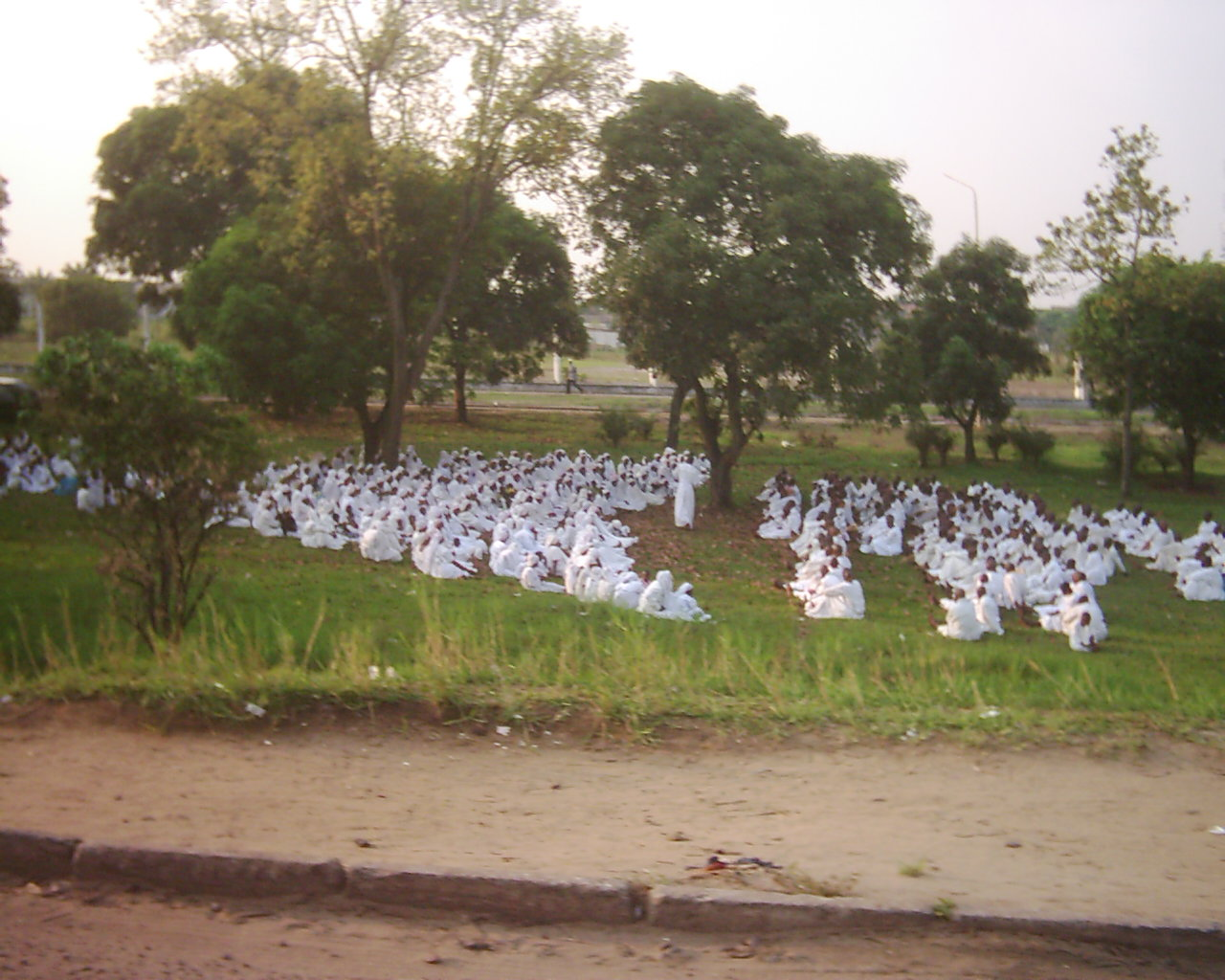
Community cultural gathering in Lemba

- Cuisine of the Democratic Republic of the Congo
- Languages of the Democratic Republic of the Congo
- Media in the Democratic Republic of the Congo
- National symbols of the Democratic Republic of the Congo
  - Coat of arms of the Democratic Republic of the Congo
  - Flag of the Democratic Republic of the Congo
  - National anthem of the Democratic Republic of the Congo
- People of the Democratic Republic of the Congo
- Prostitution in the Democratic Republic of the Congo
- Public holidays in the Democratic Republic of the Congo
- Religion in the Democratic Republic of the Congo
  - Christianity in the Democratic Republic of the Congo
  - Hinduism in the Democratic Republic of the Congo
  - Islam in the Democratic Republic of the Congo
  - Judaism in the Democratic Republic of the Congo

=== Art in the Democratic Republic of the Congo ===
- Cinema of the Democratic Republic of the Congo
- Music of the Democratic Republic of the Congo

=== Sport in the Democratic Republic of the Congo ===
Sport in the Democratic Republic of the Congo

- Football in the Democratic Republic of the Congo
- Rugby union in the Democratic Republic of the Congo
- Democratic Republic of the Congo at the Olympics

== Economy and infrastructure of the Democratic Republic of the Congo ==
- Economic rank, by nominal GDP (2007): 117th (one hundred and seventeenth)
- Agriculture in the Democratic Republic of the Congo
  - Cassava production in the Democratic Republic of the Congo
- Communications in the Democratic Republic of the Congo
  - Internet in the Democratic Republic of the Congo
- Companies of the Democratic Republic of the Congo
- Currency of the Democratic Republic of the Congo: Franc
  - ISO 4217: CDF
- Energy in the Democratic Republic of the Congo
- Health care in the Democratic Republic of the Congo
- Mining in the Democratic Republic of the Congo
- Tourism in the Democratic Republic of the Congo
- Transport in the Democratic Republic of the Congo
  - Airports in the Democratic Republic of the Congo
  - Rail transport in the Democratic Republic of the Congo

== Displacement in the Democratic Republic of the Congo ==
- Internally displaced persons in the Democratic Republic of the Congo
- Refugees of the Democratic Republic of the Congo

== See also ==
Democratic Republic of the Congo

- List of Democratic Republic of the Congo-related topics
- All pages with titles beginning with Democratic Republic of the Congo
- All pages with titles beginning with Congo-Kinshasa
- All pages with titles containing Democratic Republic of the Congo
- All pages with titles containing Congo-Kinshasa
- List of international rankings
- Member state of the United Nations
- Outline of Africa
- Outline of geography
