= Institute of Agronomy of Yangambi =

Democratic Republic of the Congo agronomy college

Coordinates: 0.760°N 24.496°E

- Institut facultaire des sciences agronomiques de Yangambi
- IFA-Yangambi campus
- Type: Public
- Established: 1971
- Affiliations: Agence universitaire de la Francophonie
- Rector: Michel Baudouin
- Students: 5,300 (2022–2023)
- Location: Kisangani, Tshopo, Democratic Republic of the Congo
- Campus: Kisangani and Yangambi
- Language: French
- Website: www.ifa-yangambi.org

The Institut facultaire des sciences agronomiques de Yangambi (IFA-Yangambi; English: Institute of Agronomy of Yangambi) is a public institution of higher education and research in the Democratic Republic of the Congo. It specialises in agronomy, forestry, animal science, soil and water sciences, and veterinary medicine. Its historical campus is located at Yangambi in Tshopo Province, while much of its teaching activity is temporarily based in Kisangani.

The institution traces its origins to the reorganisation of agricultural higher education in the country in the early 1970s. It developed from the merger of the agriculture faculties of Lovanium University in Kinshasa, the Université officielle du Congo in Lubumbashi and the Université libre du Congo in Kisangani. It became an autonomous higher-education institution in 1981.

== History ==
IFA-Yangambi traces its origins to 1971, when the agricultural faculties of three Congolese universities—Lovanium University in Kinshasa, the Université officielle du Congo in Lubumbashi, and the Université libre du Congo in Kisangani—were brought together as part of the reorganisation of higher education in the country.

According to the institution's historical account, the three faculties were formally combined into a single faculty of agronomy in 1973. The faculty initially operated in Kinshasa before being transferred to Yangambi in October 1973. Part of the land and infrastructure used at Yangambi was made available by the agricultural research institution that later became the Institut National pour l'Étude et la Recherche Agronomiques (INERA).

In 1976, the Revolutionary Council of the National University of Zaire (UNAZA) established IFA-Yangambi as an institute reporting directly to the UNAZA rectorate. Its legal status changed in 1981, when Ordinance-Law No. 025/81 of 3 October 1981 established the institute as an autonomous institut facultaire under the authority of the Congolese university administration.

In 1991, teaching activities were temporarily transferred from Yangambi to Kisangani. The institution subsequently maintained activities at both locations, with its main administrative address and temporary campus in Kisangani.

Sources differ in describing the institution's foundation date. The World Higher Education Database gives 1971 as the date of foundation, while the Agence universitaire de la Francophonie records stages in its institutional development in 1976 and 1981.

== Organization ==
IFA-Yangambi is a public higher-education institution under the supervision of the Democratic Republic of the Congo's ministry responsible for higher education. The World Higher Education Database lists Michel Baudouin as rector from 2021.

The institution is based administratively at Avenue Abbé Munyororo in the Makiso commune of Kisangani. Its Yangambi site continues to be associated with agricultural teaching, field activities and research.

== Academics ==
IFA-Yangambi provides teaching in agricultural and related sciences. Its academic fields include:

- agricultural economics;
- agronomy and crop science;
- animal science and animal husbandry;
- agricultural chemistry and agro-industry;
- forestry;
- soil and water sciences;
- botany;
- veterinary science.

The institution awards qualifications ranging from the graduat and licence to postgraduate diplomas and doctorates in agronomic sciences. It has also participated in the transition of Congolese higher education towards the bachelor's, master's and doctorate system.

The World Higher Education Database reported an enrolment of approximately 5,300 students for the 2022–2023 academic year.

== Research ==
The institution carries out agricultural research in addition to its teaching activities. Agricultural Science and Technology Indicators, a programme associated with CGIAR, has identified its principal research areas as crops, livestock and forestry.

The Yangambi site is located in an area with a long history of tropical agricultural and forestry research. IFA-Yangambi's stated mission includes both fundamental and applied research in agriculture and forestry and the transfer of scientific and technical knowledge to agricultural communities.

== Partnerships ==
IFA-Yangambi is a member of the Agence universitaire de la Francophonie.

It is also one of the African partner universities in INTERACT-Africa (Mobility in Innovative Green Technologies for Climate Change Mitigation and Sustainable Bioeconomy), an academic mobility programme involving universities in the Democratic Republic of the Congo, Kenya, Uganda, Tanzania, Ethiopia and the Czech Republic.

Under the programme, IFA-Yangambi has hosted postgraduate mobility opportunities at master's and doctoral level.

== See also ==
- Education in the Democratic Republic of the Congo
- List of universities in the Democratic Republic of the Congo
- Yangambi
- Agriculture in the Democratic Republic of the Congo
