= Moïse Lévy =

Moïse Lévy (August 12, 1915 – September 29, 2003) was a Sephardi Jewish Rabbi who led the Jewish community in the modern-day Democratic Republic of the Congo for 53 years.

== Biography ==
Lévy was born on August 12, 1915, in Antalya, then part of the Ottoman Empire. He grew up on the island of Rhodes which, at the time, was under Italian control. There he began his rabbinical studies. At age 22, having been ordained as a Rabbi, he left Rhodes for the Belgian Congo (modern-day Democratic Republic of the Congo) where a small Jewish community, composed mostly of Sephardic Jews from Rhodes, had settled in Élisabethville (modern-day Lubumbashi). He became the first Rabbi in the Congo in 1937 and, in 1953, was named Chief Rabbi of the Belgian Congo, Ruanda-Urundi, and Northern Rhodesia. He organized prayers, rites of passage and maintained Jewish life in the area. In the event of a dispute between members of the community, he served as a mediator and his judgements were accepted as final, thus avoiding having to involve the colonial administration.

The Rabbi built a sphere of influence far outside his community in Southern Congo. During the colonial period, provincial governors regularly consulted him. He had audiences with both King Leopold III and King Baudouin. When the colony became independent in 1960, Katanga Province attempted to secede from the country. Moïse Tshombe, leader of the State of Katanga, remembered the Rabbi for ruling in his favor during a dispute in his youth, and entrusted Levy with the diplomatic missions of France, the United States, and Israel. Following the rise of Mobutu Sese Seko and the creation of Zaire in 1965, Levy continued to have good relations with the local authorities and was named to the National Order of the Leopard.

Following the collapse of Zaire in the First Congo War in 1991, Levy decided to leave the country for Belgium where he retired. He died in 2003.

== Bibliography ==
- Milantia Bourla Errera (2000). Moïse Levy, un rabbin au Congo (1937-1991). Brussels: Longue vue. ISBN 2-87121-083-7.
