= Religion in the Democratic Republic of the Congo =

Religion in the DRC, 2012 census.
1. Catholicism (55%)
2. Protestantism (32%)
3. Islam (2%)
4. Others (11%)

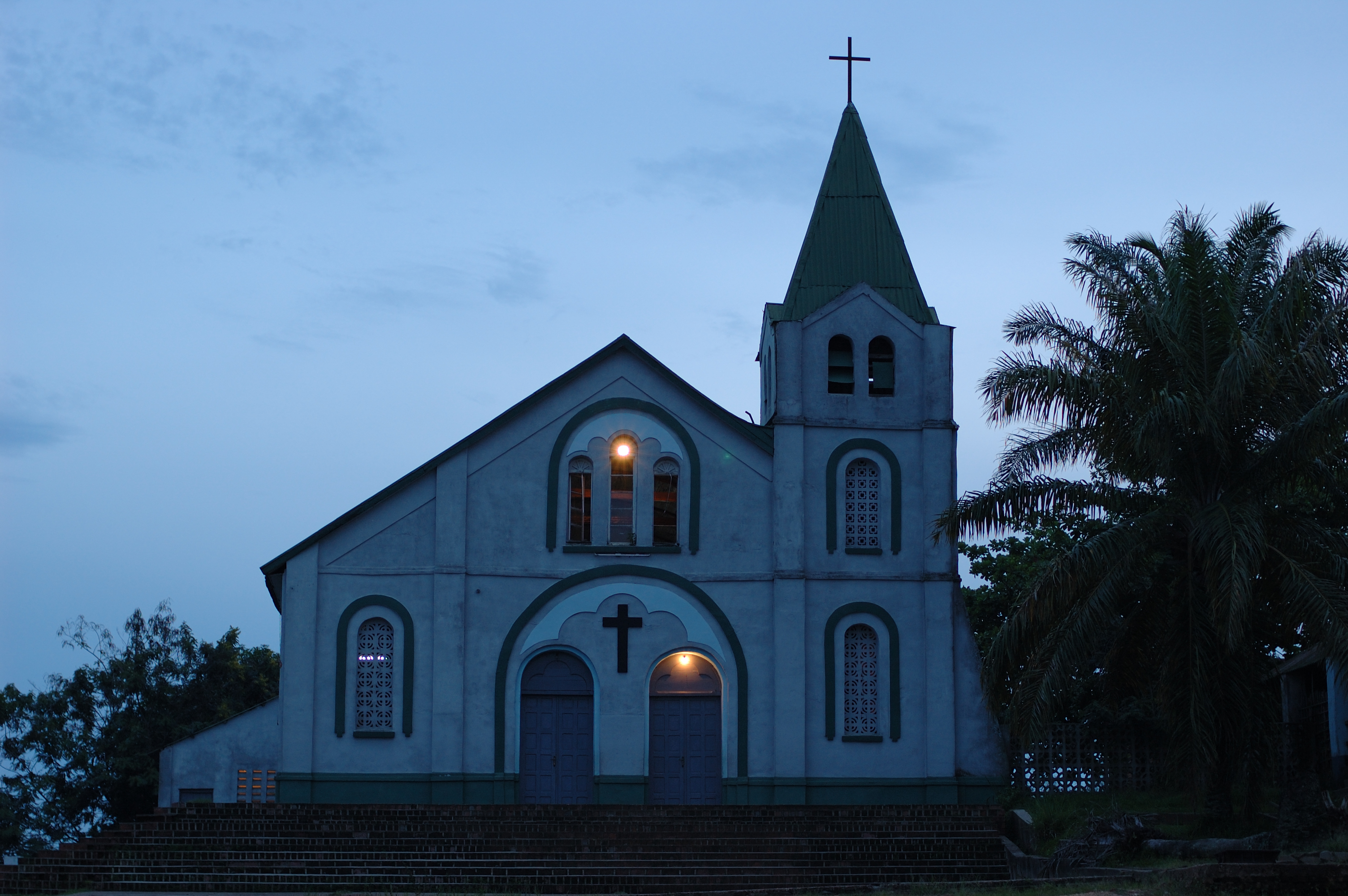
The Holy Ghost Cathedral in Kindu.

Christianity is the primary religion in the Democratic Republic of the Congo, with Catholicism and Protestantism being its main denominations.

The Democratic Republic of the Congo is a secular nation and freedom of religion is enshrined in its constitution. As of 2023, the US State Department reported that more than 95% of the population is affiliated with Christian denominations, of which nearly half are Catholic, another half are Protestant, and a small number are Jehovah's Witnesses, Mormons and Greek Orthodox. The remaining follow other non-Christian religions (Muslims, Baháʼís, Hindus, and indigenous religions).

== Overview ==
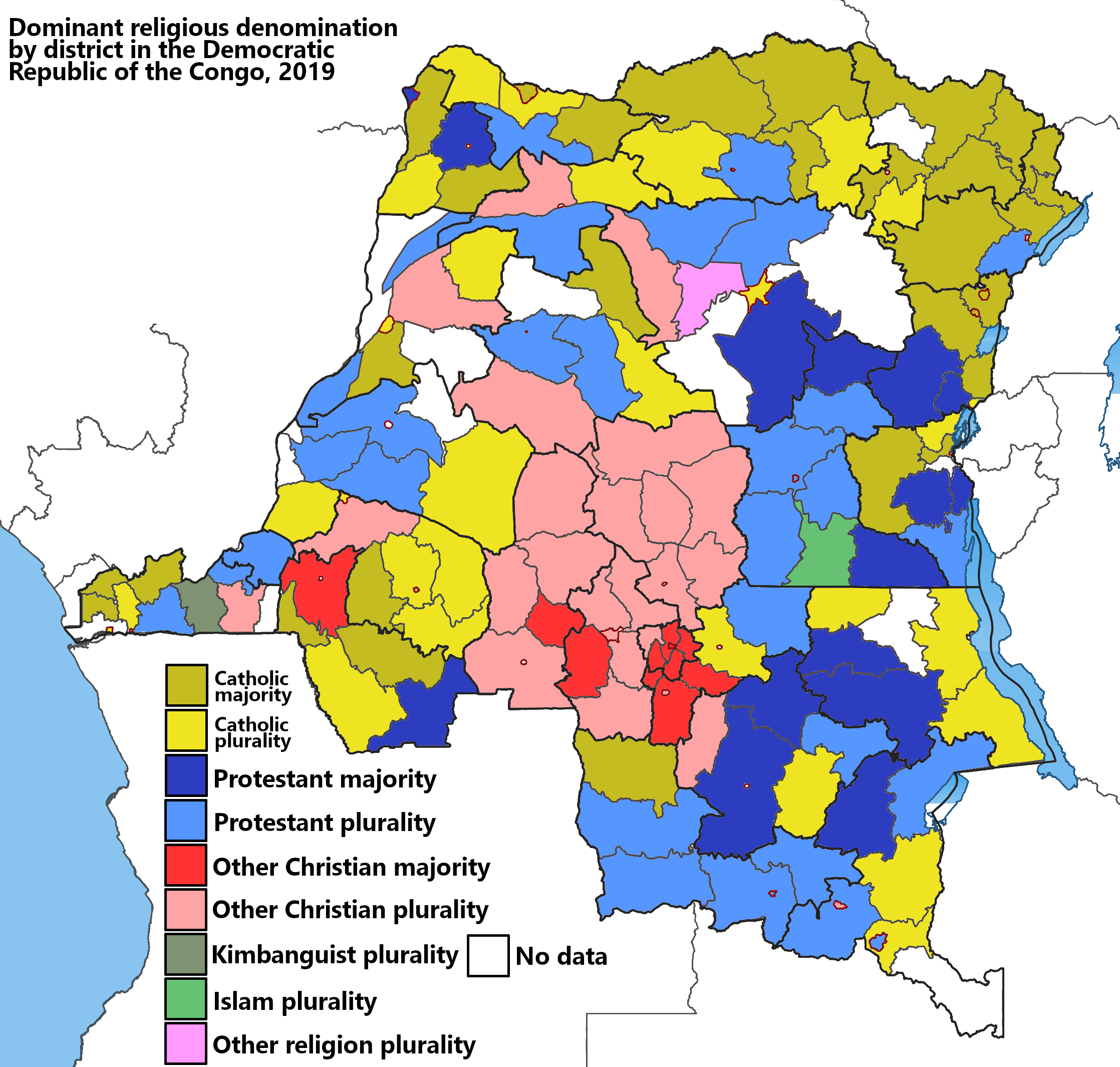
The dominant religion by district in the DRC, 2019

According to the 2020 Report on International Religious Freedom, an estimated 48.1% of the population were Protestant, including evangelical Christians and the Church of Jesus Christ on Earth through the Prophet Simon Kimbangu (Kimbanguist), and 47.3% Catholic. Other Christian groups include Jehovah’s Witnesses, The Church of Jesus Christ of Latter-day Saints, and the Greek Orthodox Church.

62 of the Protestant denominations in the country are federated under the umbrella of the Church of Christ in Congo or CCC (in French, Église du Christ au Congo or ECC). It is often simply referred to as 'The Protestant Church', since it covers most of the 20% of the population who are Protestants. Islam was introduced and mainly spread by Arab merchants and slave traders.

Traditional religions embody such concepts as pantheism, animism, vitalism, spirit and ancestor worship, witchcraft, and sorcery and vary widely among ethnic groups. The syncretic sects often merge Christianity with traditional beliefs and rituals, and may not be accepted by mainstream churches as part of Christianity. A clear delineation of religious affiliation into these membership categories can give a misleading picture of Congolese reality. The number of persons who can be categorized as belonging exclusively to one group or another is limited. Overlapping affiliations are more common. As with class identity or with ethnic identity, an individual's religious identity may be situational.

Different spiritual traditions, agents, and communities may be sought out for assistance, depending on the situation at hand. For example, Christian students may employ sorcery with the objective of improving their individual exam scores or of helping their school's soccer team win in competition against their opponents. Sophisticated urbanites, faced with disease in a family member, may patronize indigenous healers and diviners. And Congolese practicing traditional African religions may also go to both established Christian clergy and breakaway Christian sects in search of spiritual assistance. In the search for spiritual resources, the Congolese have frequently displayed a marked openness and pragmatism.

== Statistics ==
Estimates concerning religion in the DRC Congo vary greatly.

Source	Year	Christianity				Kimbanguist	Muslim	Other	None	Unspecified
Source	Year	total	Catholic	Protestant	Other	Kimbanguist	Muslim	Other	None	Unspecified
Pew Research Center		96%	47%	48%			1.5%	2.5%		
CIA World Factbook	2014	93.1%	29.9%	26.7%	36.5%	2.8%	1.3%	1.2%	1.3%	0.2%

== Christianity ==
=== Catholicism ===
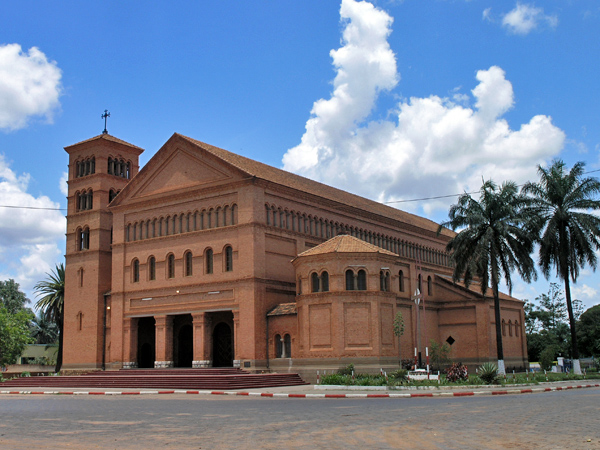
The Sts. Peter and Paul Cathedral, Lubumbashi

There are around 35 million Catholics in the country. There are six archdioceses and 41 dioceses. The impact of the Catholic Church in the DRC is enormous. Besides involving over 40% of the population in its religious services, its schools have educated over 60% of the nation's primary school students and more than 40% of its secondary students.

The church owns and manages an extensive network of hospitals, schools, and clinics, as well as many diocesan economic enterprises, including farms, ranches, stores, and artisans' shops. The church's penetration of the country at large is a product of the colonial era. The Belgian colonial state authorized and subsidized the predominantly Belgian Catholic missions to establish schools and hospitals throughout the colony.

=== Protestantism ===
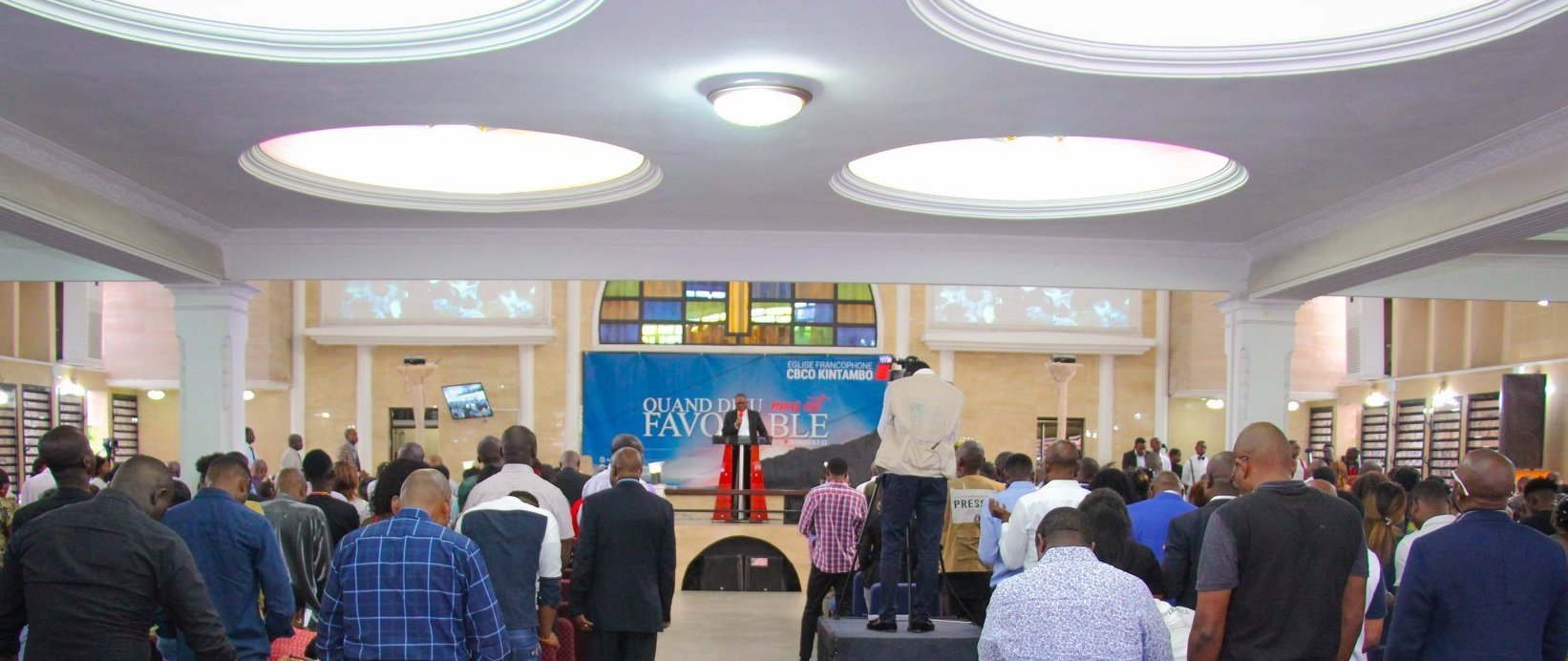
Worship service at the Église Francophone CBCO Kintambo in Kinshasa, affiliated to the Baptist Community of Congo, 2019

Protestant missionaries have been active since 1878 when the first Protestant mission was founded among the Congo. Early relations with the state were not warm. During the existence of the Congo Free State (1885–1908), some Protestant missionaries witnessed and publicized state and charter company abuses against the population during rubber- and ivory-gathering operations. That evidence helped lead to the international outcry that forced King Léopold II to cede control of the Congo Free State to the Belgian state.

Situated outside of the governing colonial trinity of state, Catholic church, and companies, Protestant missions did not enjoy the same degree of official confidence as that accorded their Catholic counterparts. State subsidies for hospitals and schools, for example, were (with two individual exceptions) reserved exclusively for Catholic institutions until after World War II.

The colonial state divided up the colony into spiritual franchises, giving each approved mission group its own territory. At independence in 1960, some forty-six Protestant missionary groups were at work, the majority of them North American, British, or Scandinavian in origin. The missions established a committee to maintain contact and minimize competition among them. This body evolved into a union called the Church of Christ in the Congo, now simply the Church of Christ in Congo. The Church of Christ developed rules that permitted members of one evangelical congregation to move to and be accepted by another. It also established institutions that served common needs, such as bookstores and missionary guest houses.

Since independence, church leadership and control have been widely and successfully Africanized, though not without conflict. Most mission property has been transferred to autonomous Congolese churches, and many foreign missionaries now work directly under the supervision of a Congolese-run church. The new indigenous leadership has succeeded in expanding its churches in Africa's largest Francophone Protestant community.

When, for example, a charismatic preacher of the officially recognized but noncharismatic Church of Christ of the Ubangi (Église du Christ de L'Oubangi) broke away in 1988 to ally his own congregation with a charismatic but officially recognized church community in distant Kivu, the Church of Christ in Zaire stepped in to adjudicate. The governing body prevented the Kivu church from accepting the rebellious preacher and his congregation, leaving him with no outside allies or resources and effectively localizing his potential impact. Protestants and Kimbanguists made up 53% of the population in 2019 according to Target Sarl.

=== The Church of Jesus Christ of Latter Day Saints ===
The Church of Jesus Christ of Latter Day Saints arrived in the Democratic Republic of the Congo in 1986 and has been growing rapidly, though it remains minor. The group first received recognition in 1986 under petition from members who had joined the Church while studying abroad in Switzerland and Belgium. The Church is thought to have 42,689 members in 145 congregations. In 2011, it announced its intention to build its first Congolese Temple in Kinshasa.

=== Kimbanguist Church ===
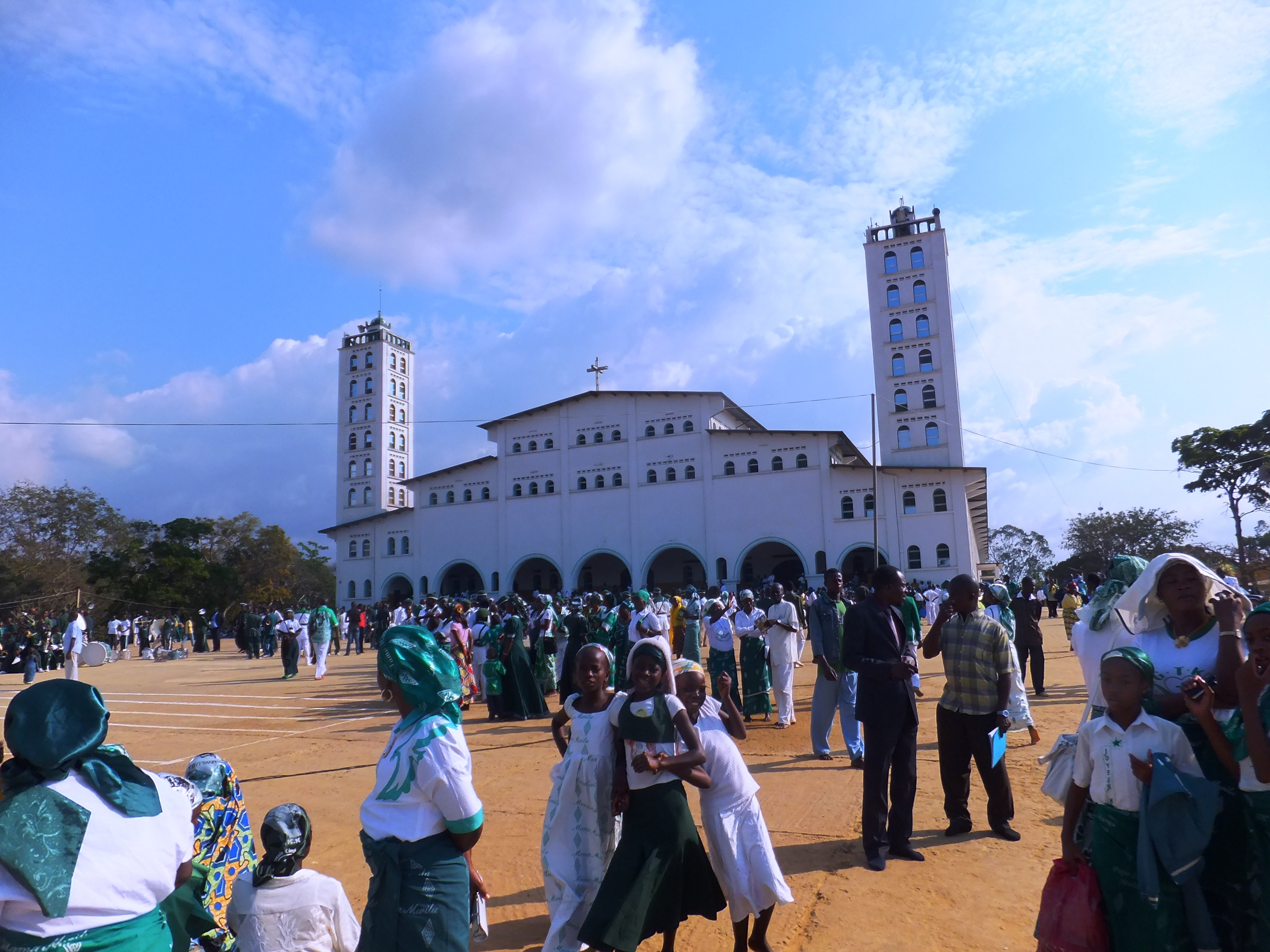
Nkamba, the holiest Kimbanguist site in the Congo

The Kimbanguist Church, a growing Congolese religion, emerged from the charismatic ministry of Simon Kimbangu in the early 1920s. Kimbangu was already a member of the English Baptist Mission Church when he reportedly first received his visions and divine call to preach the word and heal the sick. Touring the lower Congo, he gained a large following drawn both from members of Protestant churches and adherents of indigenous religious practice. He preached a doctrine that was in many ways more strict than that of the Protestantism from which it evolved. Healing by the laying on of hands; strict observance of the law of Moses; the destruction of fetishes; the repudiation of sorcery, magic, charms, and witches; and the prohibition of polygyny were all part of his original message.

The extent of his success caused increasing alarm among both church and state authorities. Numerous preachers and sages appeared, many of them professing to be his followers. Some of these preachers and possibly some of Kimbangu's own disciples introduced anti-European elements in their teachings. And European interests were affected when African personnel abandoned their posts for long periods in order to follow Kimbangu and participate in his services.

In June 1921, the government judged the movement out of control, banned the sect, exiled members to remote rural areas, and arrested Kimbangu, only to have the prophet "miraculously" escape; the escape further amplified his popular mystique. In September he voluntarily surrendered to the authorities and was sentenced to death for hostility against the state; the sentence was later commuted to life imprisonment, and Kimbangu died in prison in 1950. His movement, however, did not die with him. It flourished and spread "in exile" in the form of clandestine meetings, often held in remote areas by widely scattered groups of congregants. In 1959, on the eve of independence, the state despaired of stamping Kimbanguism out and afforded it legal recognition.

The legalized church, known as the Church of Jesus Christ on Earth by the Prophet Simon Kimbangu (Église de Jésus-Christ sur Terre par le Prophète Simon Kimbangu—EJCSK), has since succeeded in becoming one of the only three Christian groups recognized by the state, the other two being the Catholic Church and the Church of Christ in Congo. The Kimbanguist Church has been a member of the World Council of Churches since 1969. Estimates of its membership vary depending on the source. The church claims 5 million members, yet its own internal figures indicate no more than 300,000 practicing members. Individual congregations are scattered throughout much of the country, but the greatest concentrations have always been in Bas-Congo; some villages there have long been totally Kimbanguist.

Since being legalized, the Kimbanguists have bent over backward to curry favor with the state. The church's head, Simon Kimbangu's son, regularly exchanges public praise with Mobutu and has become one of the state's main ideological supports. Structurally, the church organization has been changed to parallel the administrative division of the state into regions, subregions, zones, and collectivities. The Kimbanguist Church deliberately rotates its officials outside their areas of origin in order to depoliticize ethnicity and centralize power, a policy taken directly from the state. An insistence on absolute obedience to the leader and a ban on doctrinal disputes also are shared by both institutions. In many ways, the Kimbanguist Church and the Catholic Church have exchanged places in their relationship with the state; the former outlaw has become a close ally and the former ally an outspoken critic.

=== Other African Christian movements ===
Africanized variants of traditional Christianity can be found throughout the continent. In spite of state prohibitions, new churches outside the three officially recognized in the DRC have sprung up and, so long as they remain small and nonthreatening, have usually been left alone by authorities. Some have been founded by figures known as prophets, individuals who respond to situations of popular dissatisfaction with existing spiritual agents and organizations by creating new religious movements. New movements often recombine familiar elements with new ones, a synthesis effected sometimes with exclusively indigenous elements and sometimes with a mixture of Christian and indigenous elements.

==== Jamaa ====
The Jamaa movement (jamaa means family in Swahili), like other Christian sects in Africa, has taken root under the umbrella of an existing church, in this case the Catholic one. Jamaa is actually a European-African hybrid in that it was initially founded by a Flemish Franciscan priest, Placide Tempels. Although accepted by the Catholic Church (members continue to participate in parish activities and do not withdraw from the institutional church), the church hierarchy has periodically questioned the degree to which Jamaa deviates from Catholic belief and practice. The church has never denounced the Jamaa movement, but the hierarchy has grown steadily more wary of it.

==== Kitawala ====
A much more radical product of the synthesis of African and Christendom elements is the Kitawala movement or so-called "Watchtower movement", which appeared in Katanga Province during the 1920s. "Kitawala" is derived from a Swahili term that means "to dominate, direct, or govern". Accordingly, the goal of this movement was essentially political—to establish independence from Belgium. That goal, some reasoned, could best be achieved under the cloak of religion. Kitawala groups acquired, studied, and circulated publications of Jehovah’s Witnesses. For decades people assumed that the Kitawala adherents were Jehovah's Witnesses, though this was not the case. The movement converted miners who then spread elements of the movement northward from their South African base into the Katangan copper belt.

The British missionary Joseph Booth and his African associate Elliott Kamwana became members of the Watch Tower Society in South Africa in 1906 and 1907 respectively. Kamwana returned to his native Nyasaland in 1908 and preached a mixture of sabbatarian beliefs and Watch Tower doctrines, using Watch Tower publications but did not preach the Bible Students message of exclusively. Besides preaching the imminent arrival of God's kingdom, Kamwana also preached Booth's message of racial equality, equal pay for equal work, and the millennial doctrine that all government but Christ's would cease, which was considered to be seditious and anticolonial in ideology. Kamwana's movement had no concrete strategy of revolution, although the colonial authorities arrested him after six months of preaching in April 1909. and at first imprisoned him, then deported him to South Africa in 1910.

The Watch Tower churches initiated by Kamwana in northern Nyasaland and which spread to Northern Rhodesia received funding and publications from the American Watch Tower Bible and Tract Society until 1925, the American organisation then disowned them. When Kamwana was eventually allowed to return to Nyasaland in 1937, he initiated the Mlondo or Watchman Healing Mission, an African initiated church entirely independent of the Watch Tower Society, with its own rituals and scriptural interpretations, although many of its members still read the Watch Tower Society's magazines. Kamwana remained its leader and promoted daughter churches in Tanganyika and the Belgian Congo in addition to those in Nyasaland and Northern Rhodesia before his death in 1956.

After Kamwana's death, these churches split on regional lines, those in the Belgian Congo later adopted the name "Kitawala". The greatest difference between Kitawala and the authentic Jehovah's Witnesses is that the latter do not engage in politics. As was the case with Kimbanguism, the state attempted to repress Kitawala by relegating its members to isolated rural regions. Ironically, this strategy once again simply served to speed the spread of the movement as exiled adherents converted their rural neighbours.

Over time the movement became more Africanized and more radical. The term combines the prefix "ki" with "tawala", a corruption of a local word for "tower" and is by far the most common term for the movement; the invented term "Waticitawala" has sometimes been used intentionally to evoke the early twentieth century thread from Kitawala.

Theological messages varied from place to place, but a common core of beliefs included the struggle against sorcery, the purification of society, and the existence of a black God. Kitawala denounced all forms of authority as the work of Satan, including taxes, forced labour, and most other coercive elements of colonial rule. The movement's anticolonial message was so strong that the Jehovah's Witnesses had to make it very clear that they never had anything to do with that religion.

Colonial bannings failed to eradicate the movement, however. And the independent state that succeeded colonial authority, black African though it be, has been no more successful in converting the Kitawalists from their apolitical, antiauthoritarian stance. Kitawalists continue to resist saluting the flag, participating in party-mandated public works (salongo), and paying taxes.

At times they have resisted state pressure violently, as in Shaba in 1979 when the appearance of army units in their midst provoked an attack by Kitawalists on the state's administrative offices and the killing of two soldiers. The state retaliated with a vicious repression. More frequently, Kitawalists withdraw when state pressure becomes excessive. Entire communities have moved into deep forest in areas such as Équateur Province in order to escape any contact with civil authorities.

== Traditional African religions ==
The wide variety of African indigenous beliefs and practices makes generalizations difficult, but some commonalities may nonetheless be noted. In general, Zairians believe themselves to be subject to a number of unseen agents and forces. Most indigenous communities recognize a high god, and many attribute to him the role of creator; otherwise, he has few specific characteristics beyond that of ultimate cause.

Far more significant are ancestors, who are believed to continue to play a part in community life long after their death. In general, the living are required to speak respectfully of ancestors and to observe certain rites of respect so that the dead will look favorably on their descendants' activities. Africans do not engage in ancestor worship; rather, the living address and relate to their deceased elders in much the same way that they relate to their living ones. Often the terms of address and the gifts given to placate a dead elder are identical to those accorded a living one.

Nature spirits live in particular places, such as rivers, rocks, trees, or pools, or in natural forces such as wind and lightning. A typical practice involving a nature spirit in much of northern Zaire is the commonplace tossing of a red item (palm nut, cloth, matches, etc.) in a river before crossing it, particularly in places where the water is rough or turbulent. Thus placated, the spirit will refrain from stirring up the waters or overturning the boat.

Nature spirits play a minor role in negotiating everyday life compared with that played by witches and sorcerers. Witches are individuals who possess an internal organ giving them extraordinary power, generally malevolent power. The organ and its powers are hereditary. Witches can bring death and illness to crops, animals, and people, and their actions can be voluntary or involuntary. A witch might dream an angry dream about a friend or relative, for example, and awake to find that person struck ill or dead by the agency of his or her dream. Sorcerers are the possessors of nonhereditary powers that can be bought or acquired. A sorcerer might be consulted and paid to provide a medicine or object that strengthens the client in the hunt (or, in contemporary life, in taking an exam) or that brings misfortune on an enemy.

In the event of illness, or of crop failure, or of misfortune in some other sphere of life, the stricken party may consult a diviner in order to identify the agent responsible for his or her affliction. The diviner is a specialist skilled in identifying the social tensions present in the community of the afflicted, and, for a fee, will identify the agent responsible for the individual's misfortune. By obtaining details of the afflicted person's life and social situation, the diviner will diagnose the misfortune by citing the agency of angry ancestors, nature spirits, sorcerers, or witches. Different ethnic groups add or subtract from the set of agents of affliction, but these are the most common. Once a diagnosis has been made, the diviner will then prescribe the appropriate cure. Diviners' powers are beneficent and their role highly valued.

From an outsider's perspective, the most striking aspect of indigenous belief and practice is its determinism; accidents are virtually unheard of, and there is always a cause behind any misfortune. In many indigenous societies, for example, a death is always followed by an inquest at which the cause of death and the identity of the killer are determined. Measures are then taken against the alleged miscreant, even when someone dies of disease in bed at an advanced age.

== Islam ==
Islam has been present in the Democratic Republic of the Congo since the 18th century, when Arab traders from East Africa pushed into the interior for ivory-trading purposes. Today, Muslims constitute approximately 1% to 12% of the Congolese population according to Pew Research Center. The majority are Sunni Muslims.

== Baháʼí Faith ==
The Baháʼí Faith in Democratic Republic of the Congo began after `Abdu'l-Bahá wrote letters encouraging taking the religion to Africa in 1916. The first Baháʼí to settle in the country came in 1953 from Uganda. The first Baháʼí Local Spiritual Assembly of the country was elected in 1957. By 1963 there were 143 local assemblies in Congo.

Even though the religion was temporarily banned, and the country torn by wars, the religion grew so that in 2003 there were some 541 assemblies. The Association of Religion Data Archives estimated that the DRC had the fifth highest population of Baháʼís in 2010, with some 283,000 adherents.

== Freedom of religion ==
In 2023, DRC was scored as 3 out of 4 for religious freedom.

In the same year, it was ranked as the 37th worst country to be a Christian. This was mainly due to ADF and other terrorist activity.

== See also ==
- Christianity in the Democratic Republic of the Congo
- Catholic Church in the Democratic Republic of the Congo
- Protestantism in the Democratic Republic of the Congo
- Islam in the Democratic Republic of the Congo
- History of the Jews in the Democratic Republic of the Congo
- Religion in the Republic of the Congo
