= Islam in the Democratic Republic of the Congo =

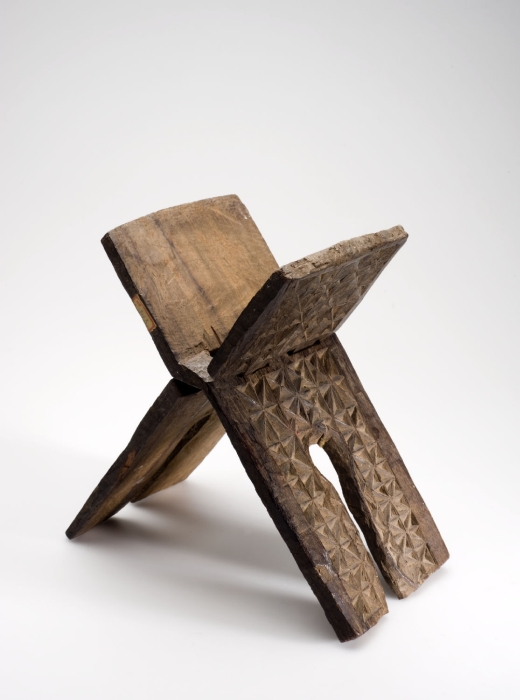
A Congolese Quran-stand, used for supporting the scriptures during prayer

Islam is a minority religion within the Democratic Republic of the Congo, where the large majority of the population is affiliated with various Christian denominations and sects. It was first introduced to the Congo Basin from the East African coast during the 19th century and remains largely concentrated in parts of Eastern Congo, notably in Maniema Province.

Most Congolese Muslims are Sunni and follow the Shafi‘i and Maliki schools of jurisprudence (fiqh). Though estimates vary, it is generally believed that between one and ten percent of the country's population identifies as Muslim.

== History ==
=== Pre-colonial and colonial periods ===
Islam was spread to the Congo in the 18th or 19th century by Afro-Arab traders, such as Tippo Tip or Rumaliza, from the East African coast as part of the slave trade which increasingly drew coastal traders into the interior in search of slaves and ivory. Although the Traders did not expressly intend to spread their religion or culture, many African peoples adopted the ideas they brought and the Swahili language was often associated with them. Their main stations were Kasongo, Kabambare, and Nyangwe. Later on they went northward and they reached Kirundu and Boyoma Falls around 1882–1883. These traders were in search of ivory and slaves, as well as other goods like copal, gum, palm-oil, parrots, etc.; they also introduced new goods in the area like fabrics, coffee, certain kinds of fruit-tree, etc. Progressively, their commercial network gave them more and more political power, and their influence became ever stronger. The local population was composed of various Bantu-speaking kingdoms and chiefdoms. Part of the local population was attracted to the culture of the newcomers and adopted some of their customs: they started to dress like them, they converted to Islam, they adopted the Swahili language. They were called Wangwana in Swahili, as opposed to the Washenzi (lit. 'savages') of the local Bantu population.

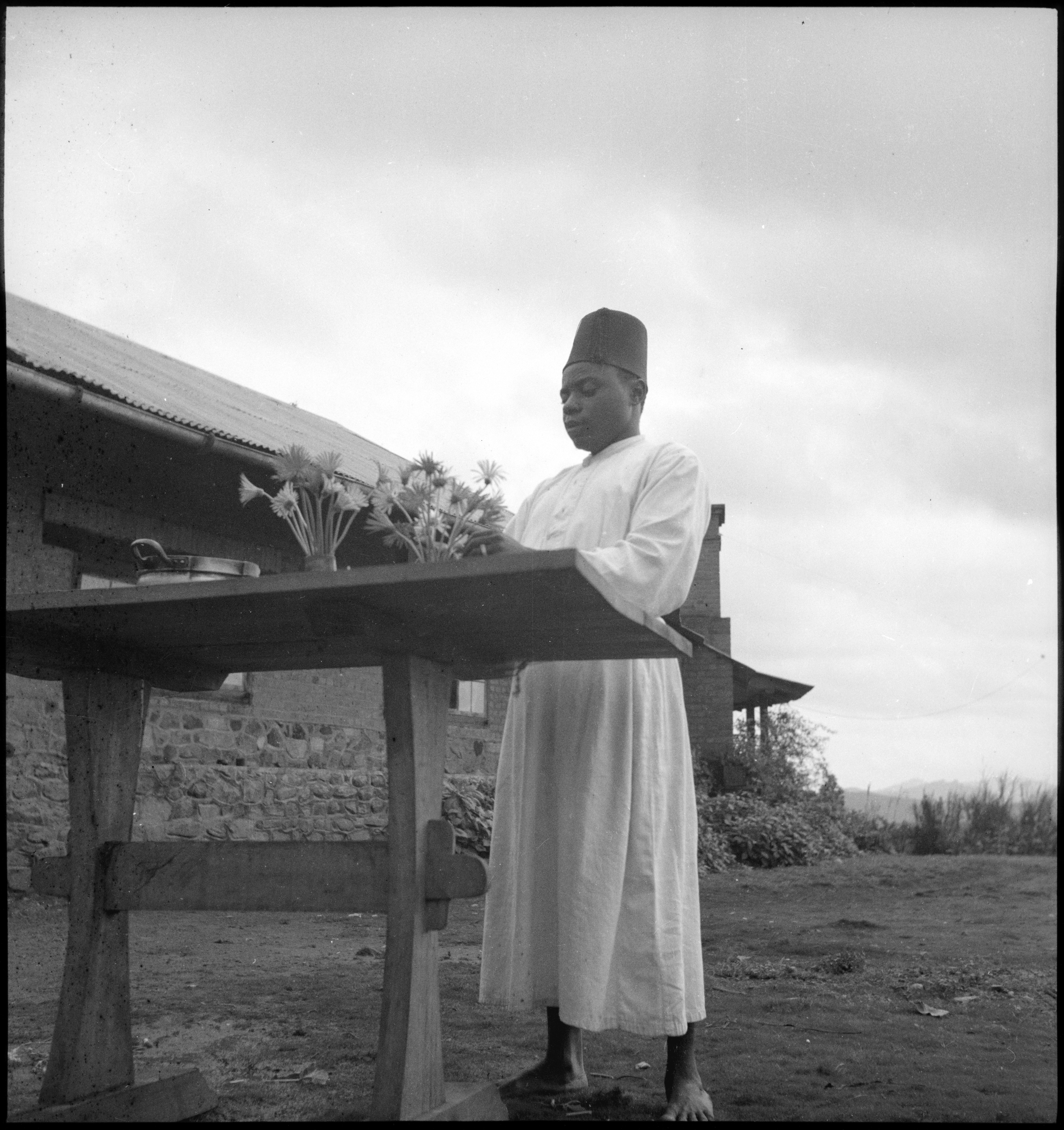
An arabisé photographed in Butembo, c.1941-42

With the expansion of European colonial rule into the eastern Congo under the auspices of the Congo Free State, European colonists came into conflict and defeated the Arabs in the 1890s, largely ending this process. Under Belgian colonial rule (1908–60), Muslims were distrusted and considered a potential source of sedition and Christianity, especially Catholicism, was promoted by the state. Congolese people who had adopted Swahili culture were referred to as arabisés (lit. 'Arabised'). Islam suffered general repression during this period. The arrival of the Qadiriyya, a branch of Sufism, from Tanganyika, in the 1920s, was particularly repressed by the colonial government.

The independence of the Congo in 1960 brought greater religious tolerance and allowed the Muslim community to organise publicly for the first time. Muslim communities received foreign support, notably from Muammar Gaddafi in the 1990s whose regime in Libya financed the construction of mosques in Eastern Congo. Since the end of the Second Congo War, the Congo's Muslim community has been increasingly united with the emergence of a national leadership.

=== Post-colonial period ===
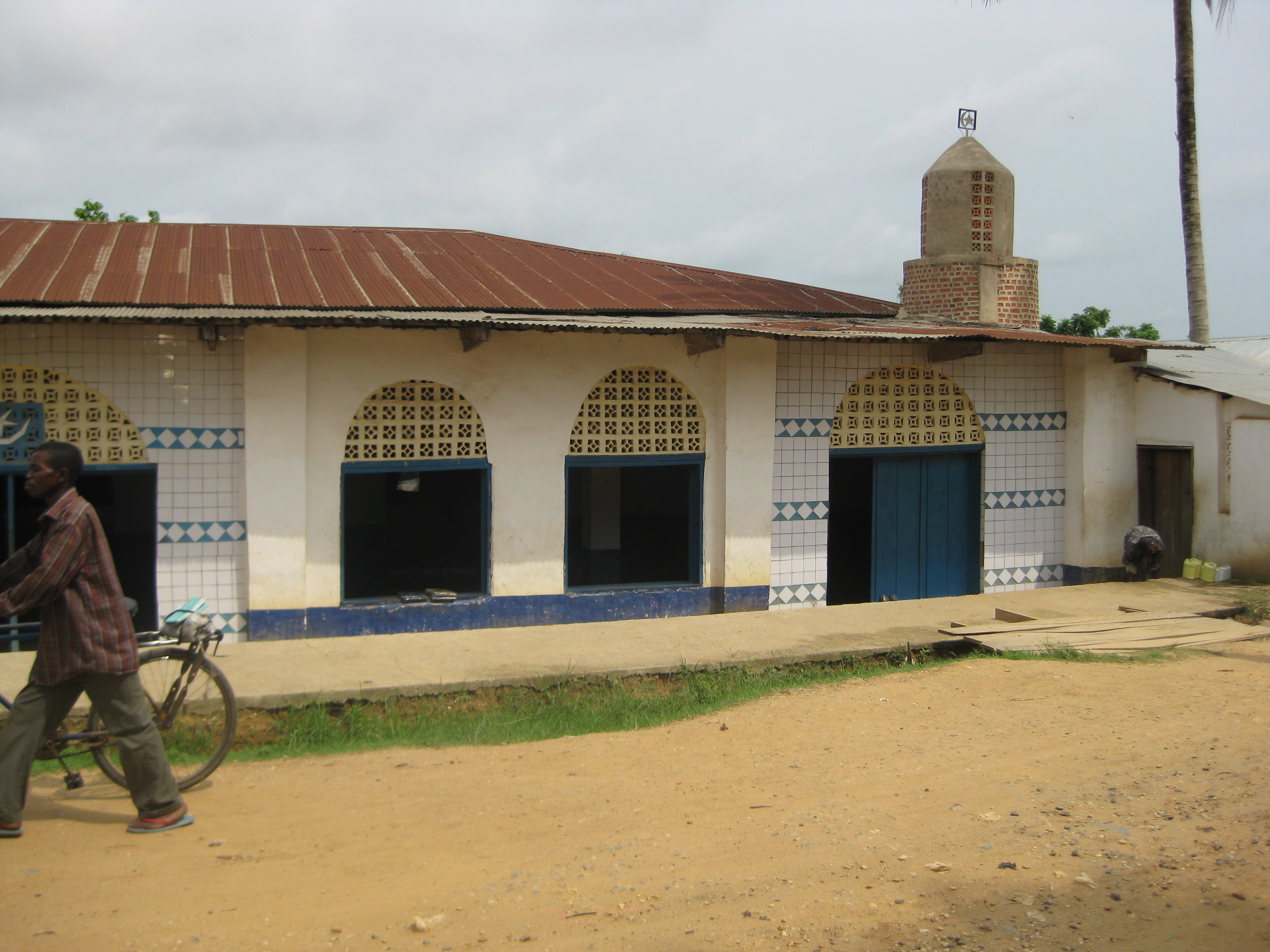
View of the mosque at Kindu (Maniema Province)

Islam is a significant religion within the modern-day Democratic Republic of the Congo. It is particularly prominent in the east of the country. The highest concentration of Muslims is estimated to be in Maniema Province and especially the cities of Kasongo and Kindu where they represent 80–90 percent and 25 percent of the population respectively. The second largest concentration of Muslims is in Kisangani where they make up 15 percent of the population. Besides indigenous Muslims, the population also includes recent immigrants from Lebanon, India, Pakistan and other parts of the African continent.

Congolese Muslims are represented at a national level by the Islamic Community of the Democratic Republic of the Congo (Communauté islamique du République démocratique du Congo, or Comico) which succeeded the Islamic Community of Zaire (Communauté islamique du Zaïre, Comiza) founded in the 1970s. However, the religion has little political influence in national politics and are underrepresented in its institutions. In the 2006 general elections, just four Muslims deputies and three senators were elected out of 500 and 108 respectively.

Violence between Muslims and other religious groups in the Congo, especially Congolese Christians, has been attested in North Kivu since 2014 in connection with the Allied Democratic Forces insurgency which originated in neighbouring Uganda. The Allied Democratic Forces, whose political ideology is based on Islamism, is widely suspected of having perpetrated the Beni massacre in August 2016. It was reported in 2019 that the Pakistani contingent of the United Nations MONUSCO force was reported to have financed the construction of new mosques in the region, contributing to an "islamisation" of Eastern Congo.

== Religious affiliations ==
The vast majority of Muslims in the Democratic Republic of the Congo identify themselves as Sunni, following the Maliki school of jurisprudence (fiqh). 10 percent are Shia and six percent are Ahmadi. Congolese Muslims are frequently divided between Sufis and Salafists as well as along local ethnic, geographical, and generational lines.

== Numbers ==
Recent estimates of the proportion of the Congolese population who self-identify as Muslim vary considerably and range between approximately one and 10 percent. According to the political scientist Ashley E. Leinweber, it is generally estimated that around 10 percent of the national population identifies as Muslim. In 2012, the Pew Research Center estimated the figure at 12 percent. However, another Pew estimate in 2007 put the figure at just 1.4 percent. An estimate by the US Department of State put the figure at 5% in 2015, and the CIA World Factbook at 1.3%.

== See also ==
- Islam in Africa
- Religion in the Democratic Republic of the Congo
- Christianity in the Democratic Republic of the Congo

== Notes ==
=== Bibliography ===
- Leinweber, Ashley E. (2012). "The Muslim Minority of the Democratic Republic of Congo: From Historic Marginalization and Internal Division to Collective Action". Cahiers d'études africaines. 2 (206–7): 517–44. doi:10.4000/etudesafricaines.17091.
- Battory, Jean; Vircoulon, Thierry (February 2017). "L'islam radicale en République démocratique du Congo: Entre mythe et manipulation'" (PDF). Notes de l'Ifri. Institut français des relations internationales. Archived from the original (PDF) on 27 October 2021.
- Braeckman, Colette (7 December 2019). "L'Est du Congo, nouvelle cible du combat djihadiste?". Le Carnet de Colette Braeckman. Le Soir.
