= Agriculture in the Democratic Republic of the Congo =

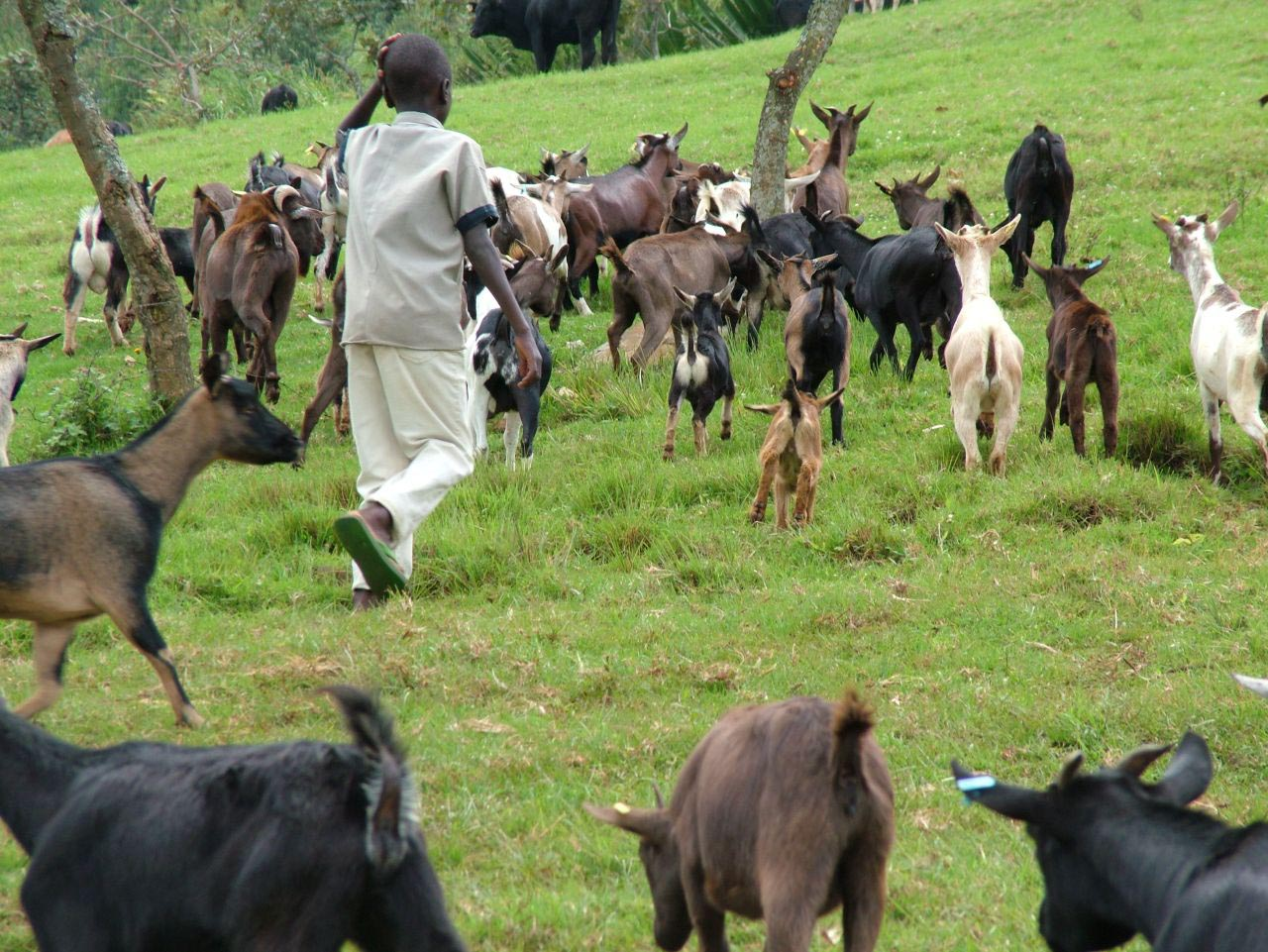
Animal husbandry in the DRC

Agriculture in the Democratic Republic of the Congo is an industry in the country of the Democratic Republic of the Congo that has plenty of potential.

== Overview ==
The agricultural sector supports two-thirds of the population. Agricultural production has stagnated since independence. The principal crops are cassava, yams, plantains, rice, and maize. The country is not drought-prone but is handicapped by a poor internal transportation system, which impedes the development of an effective national urban food-supply system.

== Production ==
The Democratic Republic of the Congo has the sixth highest proportion of women working in agriculture, forestry and fishing in the world.

The Democratic Republic of Congo produced, in 2018:

- 29.9 million tons of cassava (3rd largest producer in the world, second only to Nigeria and Thailand);
- 4.7 million tons of plantain (largest producer in the world);
- 2 million tons of maize;
- 1.1 million tons of palm oil;
- 990 thousand tons of rice;
- 384 thousand tons of sweet potato;
- 309 thousand tons of banana;
- 307 thousand tons of peanut;
- 213 thousand tons of mango (including mangosteen and guava);
- 213 thousand tons of papaya;
- 205 thousand tons of beans;
- 186 thousand tons of pineapple;
- 168 thousand tons of orange;
- 101 thousand tons of potato;

In addition to smaller productions of other agricultural products, such as coffee (29 thousand tons), cocoa (3.6 thousand tons), natural rubber (14 thousand tons) and tea (3.6 thousand tons).

== Crops ==
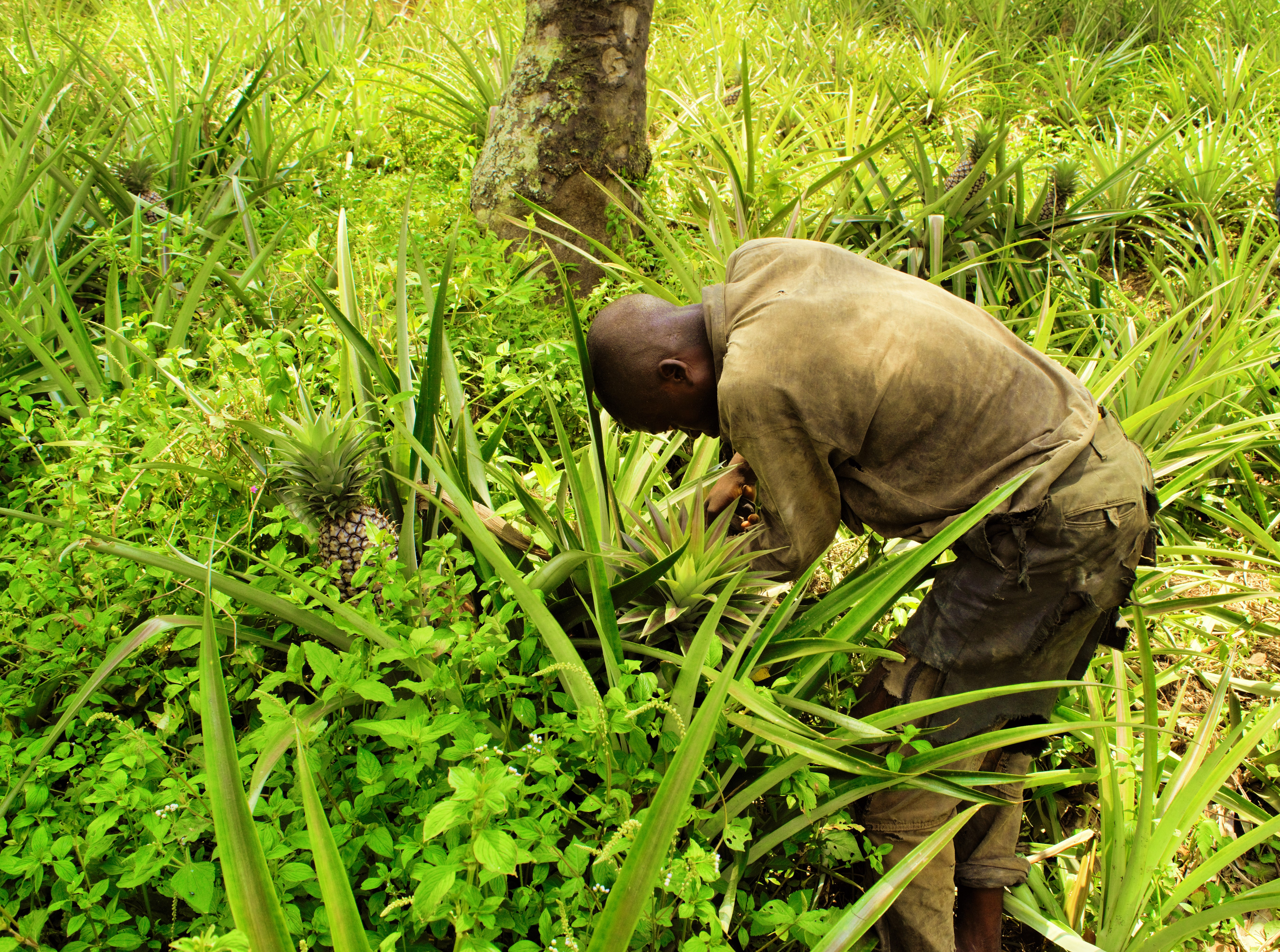
Harvesting pineapple in the Kasaï region

Land under annual or perennial crops constitutes only 3.5 percent of the total land area. Agriculture is divided into two basic sectors: subsistence, which employs the vast majority of the work force, and commercial, which is export-oriented and conducted on plantations. Subsistence farming involves four million families on plots averaging 1.6 hectares (four acres), usually a little larger in savanna areas than in the rain forest.

Subsistence farmers produce mainly manioc, corn, tubers, and sorghum. In 2004, food-crop production included manioc, 14,950,000 tons; sugarcane, 1,787,000 tons; corn, 1,155,000 tons; peanuts,1,120,000 tons; beans 364,000 tons; and rice, 315,000 tons. In 2004, plantains totalled 1,199,000 tons; sweet potatoes, 224,500 tons; bananas, 313,000 tons; yams, 84,000 tons; and pineapples, 193,000 tons. Domestic food production is insufficient to meet the country's needs, and many basic food products have to be imported.

== Exports ==
The production of cash crops was severely disrupted by the wave of civil disorder that engulfed the country between 1960 and 1967, and production fell again after many small foreign-owned plantations were nationalized in 1973–74. By the mid-1990s, the production of the DRC's principal cash crops (coffee, rubber, palm oil, cocoa, tea) was mostly back in private hands. Commercial farmers number some 300,000, with holdings between 12 and 250 hectares (30 and 618 acres).

=== Coffee ===
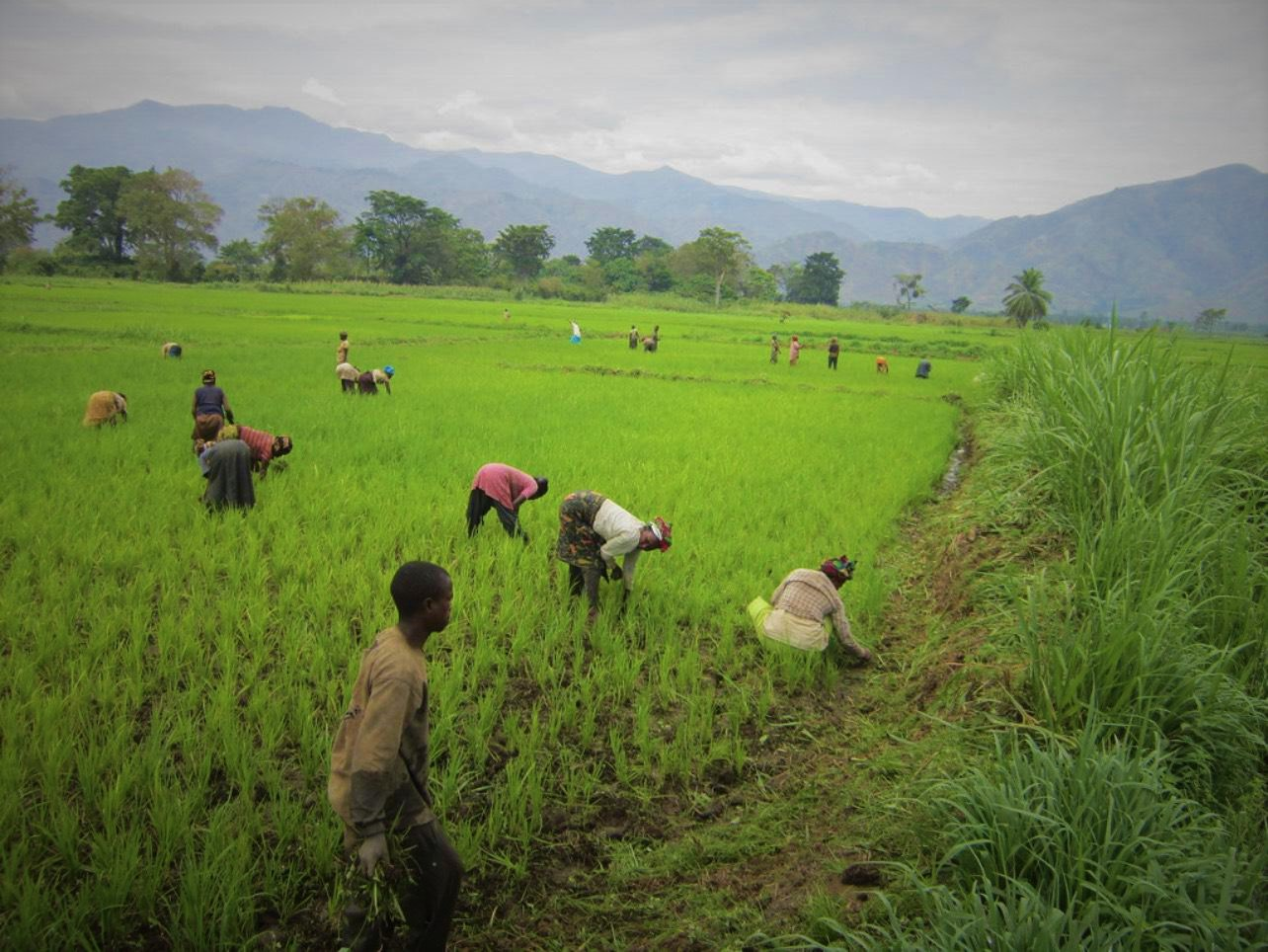
Congolese farmers in the Ruzizi Plain

Coffee is the DRC's third most important export (after copper and crude oil) and is the leading agricultural export. An estimated 33,000 tons were produced in 2004 (down from an average of 97,000 tons during 1989–91); 80 percent of production comes from the provinces of Haut Congo, Equateur, and Kivu.

10–15 percent of production is robusta; coffee exports are mostly sold to Italy, France, Belgium, and Switzerland. The collapse of the International Coffee Agreement in 1989 quickly led to a doubling of exports by the former Zaire, whereupon the surplus entering the world market drove down prices rapidly.

=== Rubber ===
Rubber is the fourth most important export cash crop. The plantation crop has been slowly recovering from nationalization. Some plantations are now replanting for the first time in over 20 years.

== See also ==
- Cassava production in the Democratic Republic of the Congo
- Economy of the Democratic Republic of the Congo
