= Christianity in the Democratic Republic of the Congo =

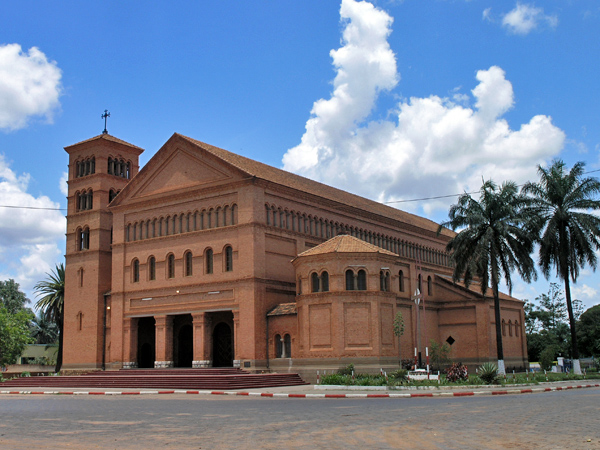
The Roman Catholic Cathedral of Saints Peter and Paul in Lubumbashi

Christianity is the largest religion of the Democratic Republic of the Congo and is professed by more than 95% of the population.

According to the 2020 Report on International Religious Freedom, an estimated 48.1% of the population are Protestant (including evangelical Christians and the Church of Jesus Christ on Earth) and 47.3% are Catholic. Other Christian groups include Jehovah's Witnesses, The Church of Jesus Christ of Latter-day Saints, and the Greek Orthodox Church.

== History ==
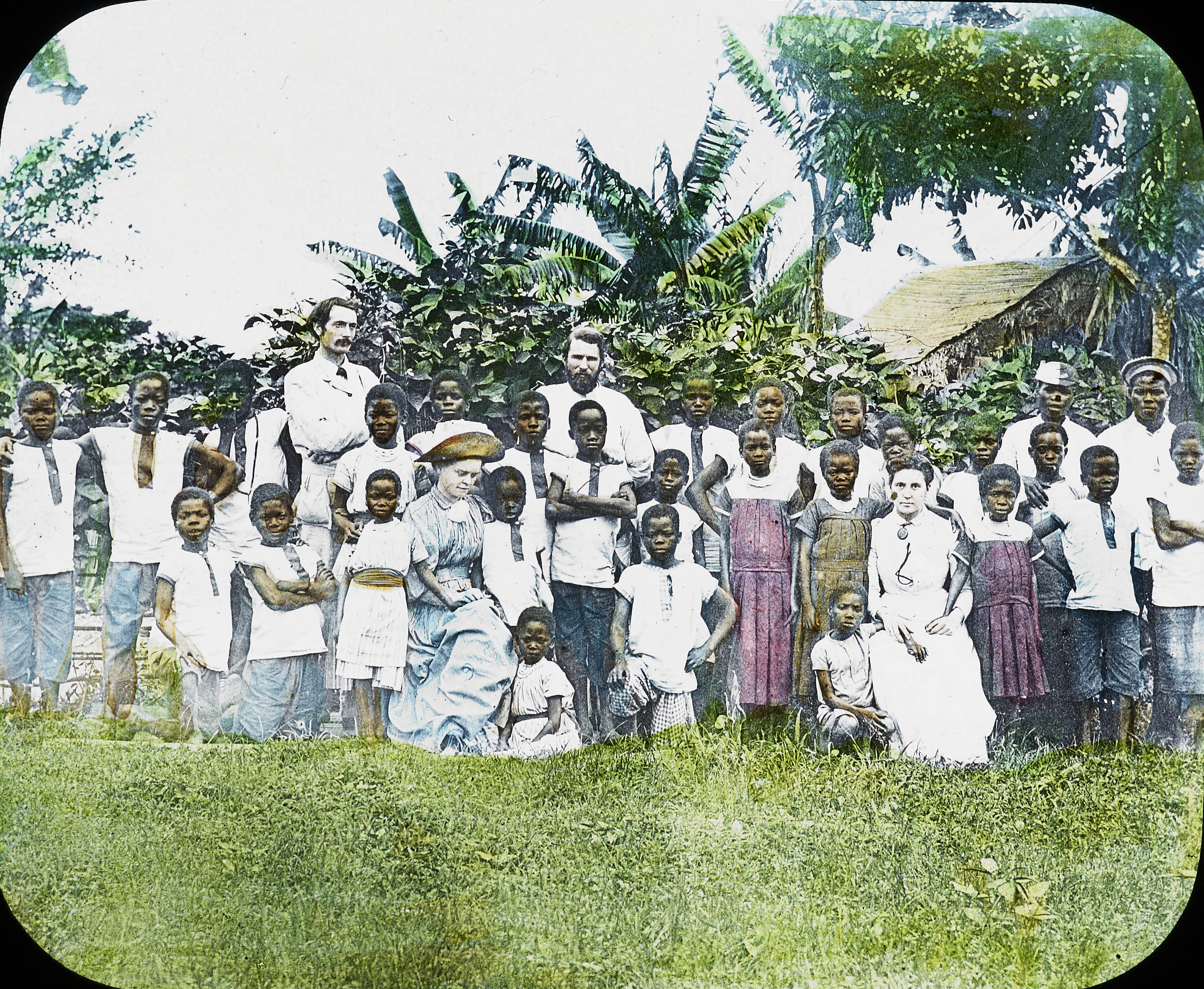
Congolese converts to Protestantism with white missionaries at the Congo-Balolo Mission, c.1889

The history of Christianity in the area of the modern-day Congo is closely linked to the history of European colonial expansion.

The earliest evidence for the adoption of Christian religious practices in the area of the modern-day Democratic Republic of the Congo dates to the late 15th century. In 1491, King Nzinga of the Kongo Kingdom (Note: The Kongo Kingdom was located on the Atlantic coast of Central Africa in parts of modern-day Democratic Republic of the Congo, Republic of the Congo, and Angola.) converted to Christianity, taking the Christian name João, after coming into contact with Portuguese colonial explorers. The conversion facilitated trade with the Portuguese and increased the status of the Kongo Kingdom in the eyes of European states. Afonso I (r. 1506–43) even travelled to Europe where he studied religion. The Kongo Kingdom adopted a form of Catholicism and was recognised by the Papacy, preserving the beliefs for nearly 200 years.

The largest expansion of Christianity occurred under Belgian colonial rule. In 1885, Belgium's monarch, Leopold II, established a personal colony in Central Africa known as the Congo Free State which, in 1908, was annexed by Belgium as the Belgian Congo. Under both the Free State and Belgian regimes, Christian missions were encouraged to work in the Congo as part of the civilising mission which served as the colonial project's justification to European public opinion. Missionaries played an important role in providing schooling during the colonial period. Catholic mission, for example, helped to establish the Congo's first university, Lovanium, in 1954.

In the post-independence period, distrust between the Churches and the state grew, exacerbated in the early 1970s by attempts by the new Zairean government to secularise education. Since 2014, sporadic outbreaks of violence against Christians have occurred in North Kivu as part of the ongoing Kivu conflict. Massacres of approximately 645 people have been perpetrated by the Islamist Allied Democratic Forces (now Islamic State – Central Africa Province) rebel group which has been largely forced out of neighbouring Uganda. In 2020, 50.5% of the population were Pentecostal, Charismatic, Evangelical and Protestant denominations.

== By denomination ==
=== Catholicism ===
For much of the colonial period, Catholic missions received preferential treatment and a subsidy from the state denied to missions from other denominations.

In 2016, the CIA World Factbook estimated that 50 percent of the Congo's total population were Roman Catholic. In the same year, the Pew Research Centre provided the estimate of 47.3 percent or over 31 million people, or 2.8 percent of the world's Catholic population. In 2020, that estimate was steady at 47.3%.

=== Protestantism ===
The first Protestant mission in the Congo was sent by the British Baptist Missionary Society and arrived in 1878, shortly before the creation of the Congo Free State. Throughout the colonial period, Protestant missions maintained a difficult relationship with the colonial authorities. Most Belgian officials were Catholics and distrusted Protestant missionaries, which were often foreigners from the United Kingdom or the United States, but were unable to expel them under the terms of the Berlin Conference.

In 2016, it was estimated that 20 percent of the Congo's population were Protestant, excluding Kimbanguists. The Pew Center provides a considerably higher estimate the number of Protestants (including Kimbanguists) at nearly 32 million or 48 percent of the population, representing 4 percent of the world's Protestants. By 2020 the estimate was 48.1%. There are 28 million Pentecostals and Charismatics in the country.

=== Kimbanguism ===
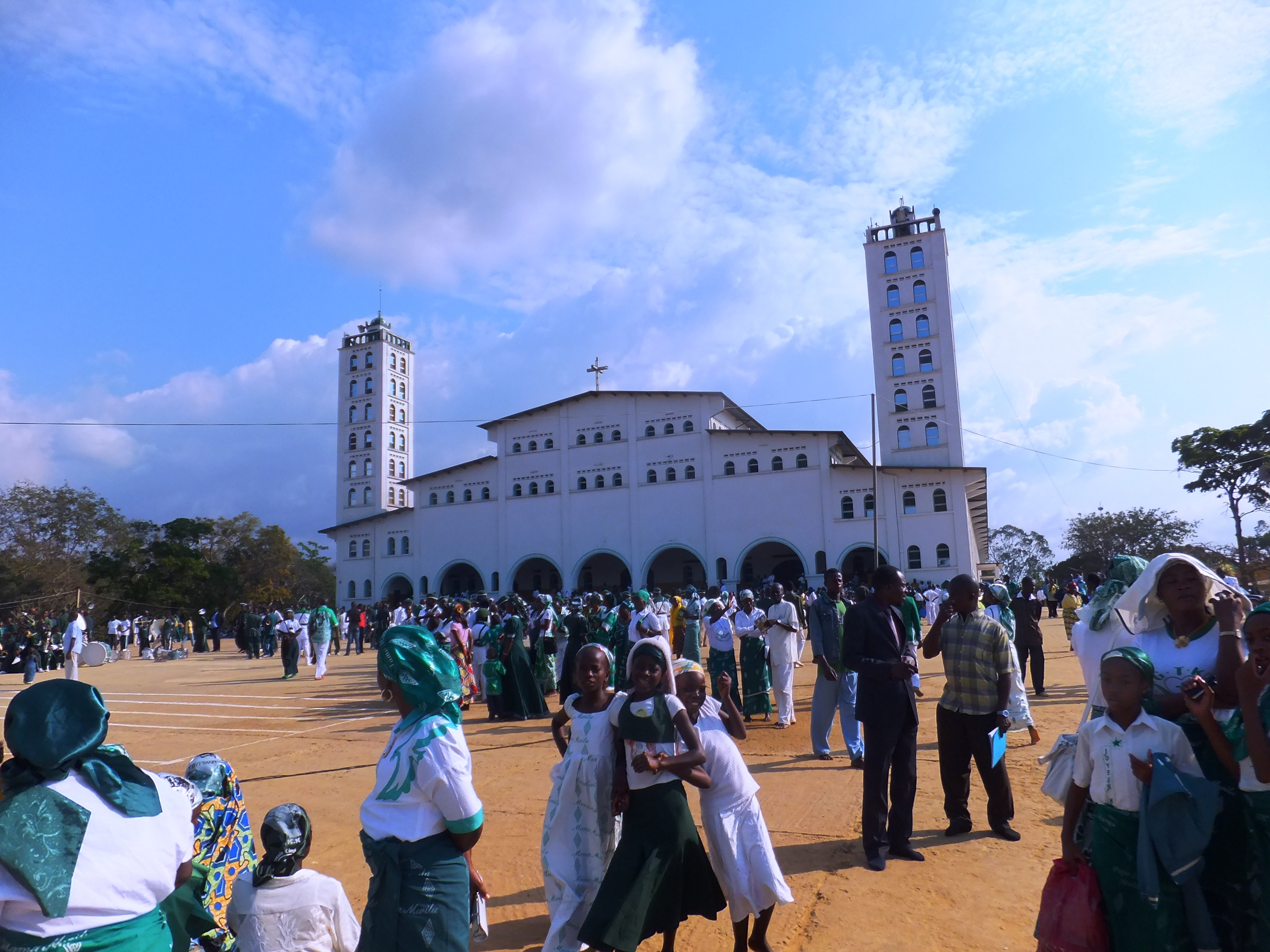
Kimbanguists in Nkamba, the spiritual centre of the sect, in Bas-Congo

Kimbanguism, officially the Church of Jesus Christ on Earth by His Special Envoy Simon Kimbangu, is a major new religious movement indigenous to the Democratic Republic of the Congo. It holds that Simon Kimbangu (1887–1951) was a prophet but shares commonalities with Baptist Christianity. It is headquartered in Nkamba, Kongo Central which was Kimbangu's birthplace and is known as "New Jerusalem". It is estimated that as many as 10 percent of the Congo's population are followers.

=== Others ===
The Pew Center estimates the Congo's population of "Other Christians" at 260,000. Fewer than 0.1 percent of the population are Orthodox Christians. Chrysostomos Papasarantopoulos was notably influential in spreading Orthodox Christianity in the Congo over 1970–1972.

== Freedom of Religion ==
In 2023, DRC was scored as 3 out of 4 for religious freedom.

In the same year, it was ranked as the 37th worst country to be a Christian. This was mainly due to ADF/IS-CAP and other terrorist activity.

== See also ==
- Religion in the Democratic Republic of the Congo
- Islam in the Democratic Republic of the Congo

== Bibliography ==
- Boyle, Patrick M. (1995). "School Wars: Church, State, and the Death of the Congo". Journal of Modern African Studies. 33 (3): 451–68. doi:10.1017/S0022278X00021200. JSTOR 161485.
- Markowitz, Marvin D. (1970). "The Missions and Political Development in the Congo". Africa: Journal of the International African Institute. 40 (3): 234–47. doi:10.2307/1158884. JSTOR 1158884.
