= History of the Jews in the Democratic Republic of the Congo =

- Map showing location of 3 Jewish Congolese communities

Total population
- 320

Religion
- Judaism

The history of the Jews in the Democratic Republic of the Congo can be traced back to 1907, when the first Jewish immigrants began to arrive in the country. The current Jewish Congolese population is mostly of Sephardi background.

== History ==
The territory which is now the Democratic Republic of the Congo was first annexed and colonised by Europeans after 1885 within what was then the Congo Free State. In 1908, the Free State was annexed by Belgium, becoming the Belgian Congo.

The first Jews in the Congo were Eastern European immigrants from Romania and Poland. Within the next few years, more Jewish immigrants arrived from South Africa. In 1911, Sephardi Jews came from the Island of Rhodes in what is now Greece (then part of the Ottoman Empire) settled in the Congo. That same year, a Jewish community center was established named the Communauté du Congo Belge et du Ruanda-Urundi. A synagogue was built in Lubumbashi in 1930. Rabbi Moses Levy acted as the Jewish community leader throughout the Congo and Ruanda-Urundi (present day Rwanda and Burundi). Due to an economic crisis during the 1930s, most of the Eastern European Jews left the Congo. However, after the crisis had passed more Jews immigrated from Eastern Europe and were joined by Southern European Jews.

Prior to the establishment of the State of Israel in 1948, the Congo was home to numerous Zionist organizations, led by the Association Sioniste du Congo Belge. After the independence of Congo from Belgium in 1960, the majority of Congolese Jews left the country, with most of them settling in Israel or South Africa. At the time of independence, Congo was home to 2,500 Jewish people. 50% of the Jewish population lived in Lubumbashi, while 70 Jewish families lived in Congo's capital Kinshasa. Jewish children at the time were taught classes in Hebrew and Judaism in public schools.

In 2013, the Jewish population was around 320 and was settled mostly in Lubumbashi. Most are Sephardi and speak Ladino, a Spanish-Jewish language. There is a synagogue in Lubumbashi that is served by a rabbi. There is also small Jewish community living in Kinshasa that is known as the Congrégation Israélite. Chabad also has operations in the country, and their Central African headquarters in Kinshasa. Chabad has a synagogue and a Hebrew school, and groups of their rabbinical students come to study for a year there while also being sent to other places in sub-Saharan Africa to provide Jewish communities with programs.

== See also ==
- History of the Jews in Africa

=== Regions ===
- History of the Jews in Central Africa
- History of the Jews in East Africa
- History of the Jews in North Africa
- History of the Jews in Southern Africa
- History of the Jews in West Africa

=== Topics ===
- Kingdom of Loango
