= Cassava production in the Democratic Republic of the Congo =

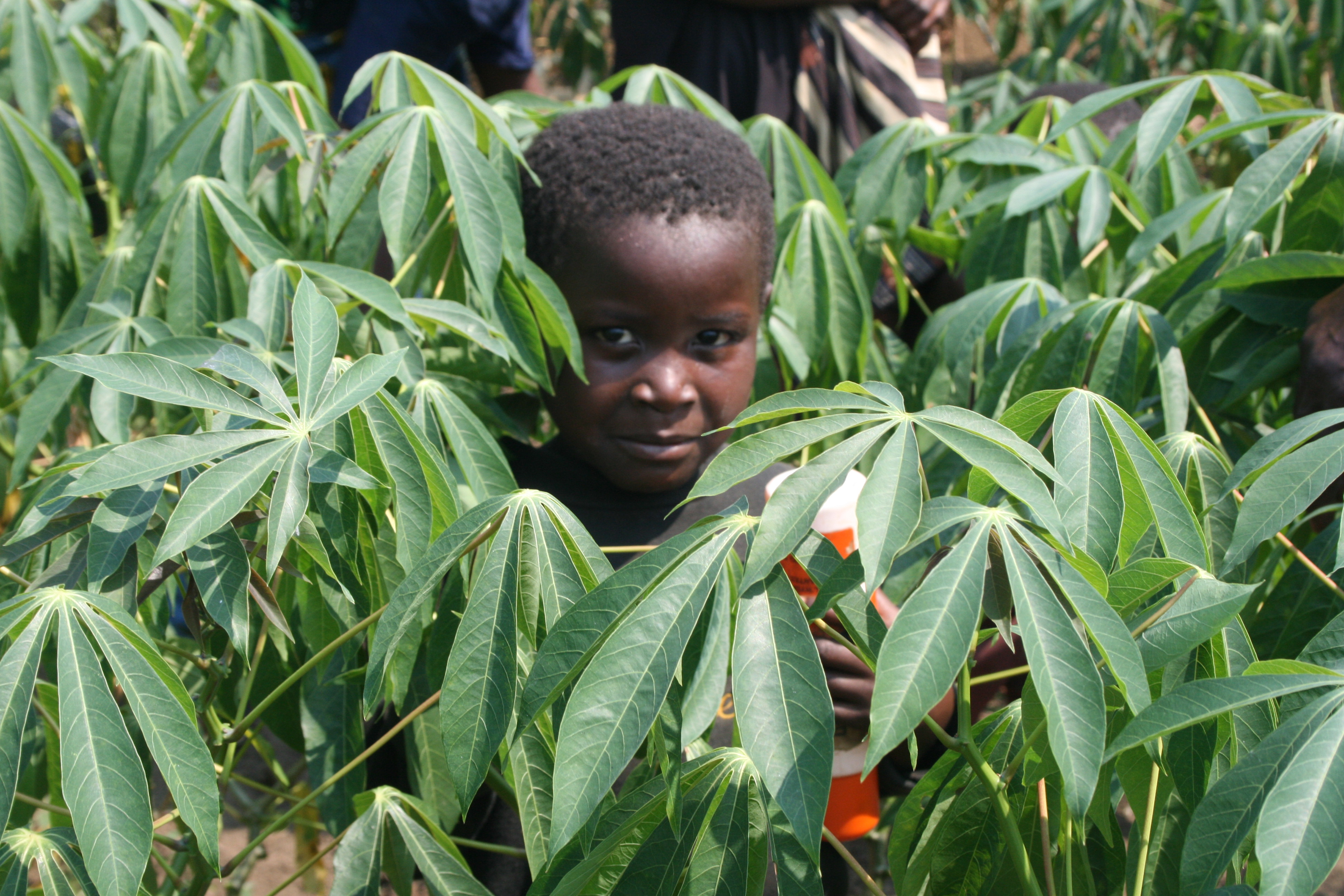
A cassava plant in the DRC

Cassava (Manihot esculenta) production is important to the economy of Democratic Republic of the Congo (DRC). It is one of the country's principal crops, with per capita consumption of 353 kg per year, which is the highest in the world. Zaire, now the DRC, was the world's largest consumer of cassava with Republic of the Congo ranked second in 1996.

== History ==
Cassava, a perennial crop, originally from South America, was introduced in the Congo Basin of Africa in 1558 by the Portuguese from Brazil. It was meant to be a famine proofing crop. Farmers in the Congo region, who were used to growing staple crops of millet, banana and yam, willingly adopted to cassava as it was pest free and a reliable crop during drought conditions, which was then entirely for domestic consumption without any export potential. Approximately 22 percent of the cultivated land area in 1959 was devoted to cassava.Cassava Bacterial Blight in the early 1970s, led to total crop failure and ensuing famine.

== Uses ==
DRC has the world's record average per capita consumption of 353 kg per year, which is equivalent to 145 kg in flour form. The flour form worked into a dough is known as fou-fou. The country is also the leading consumer of the cassava leaves as a vegetable as the leaves are rich in proteins, calcium, vitamin A and Vitamin C. Cassava products manufactured and used in DRC include bakery products using unfermented flour, pulp and wafers, and industrial products such as starch, alcohol and biofuel.

== Production ==
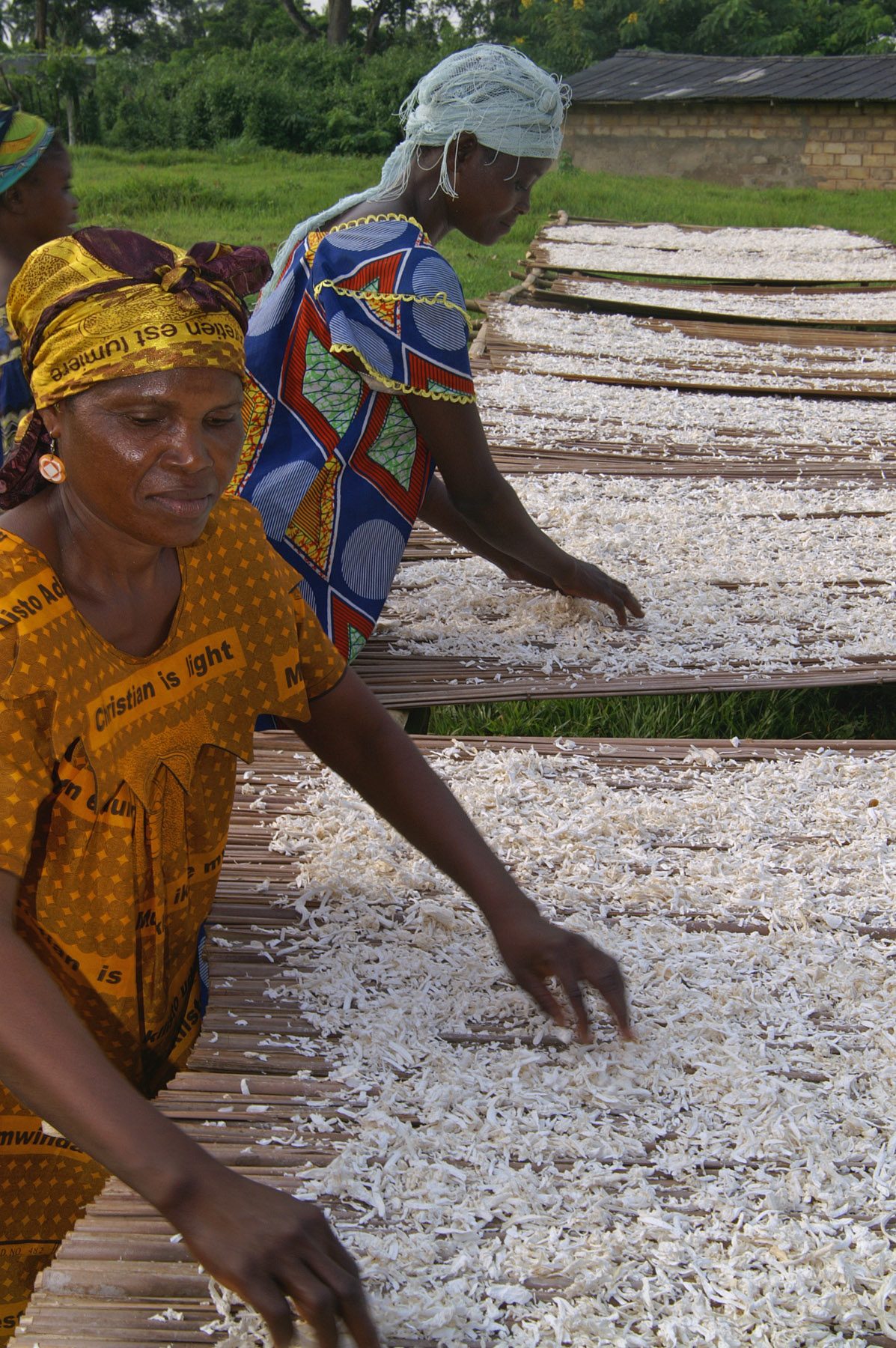
Drying cassava chips

Cassava production is possible on more than 50 percent of the DRC's land area. According to an FAO estimate of 2000, the cassava production from an area of 2 million ha amounted to 16.5 million tons. The southern region accounted for 2.4 million tons from an area of 358,000 ha.

A new variety of cassava introduced for better yields is called the TME 419 Cassava, which is expected to gradually replace the present F100 variety, which is affected by a plant disease called mosaic. This variety has become popular in western DRC with much higher yield and profits to the farmers. It is likely to be extended to the rest of the country in the near future. Vitamin A Cassava is another variety which was introduced in the four provinces of Kinshasa, Bas-Congo, Orientale, and Kivu to achieve food security and increase income levels. Its yield was about 16 million tonnes as of 2012. It is planned to cover 750,000 farming communities by 2018 with this variety.

The production of the most important crop in DRC is constrained by several factors such as pest infestations, inadequate tools for plating, and inadequate infrastructure. Fermented and dried cassava pulp, known as cossettes, is produced through a simple process, and is not labor-intensive, while chickwangue is a familiar processed product in the DRC using cassava.

== Bibliography ==
- American University. Foreign Areas Studies Division (1971). Area handbook for the Democratic Republic of the Congo (Congo Kinshasa). Washington, D.C.: U.S. Government Printing Office.
- Bhat, Rajeev; Alias, Abd Karim; Paliyath, Gopinadham (10 January 2012). Progress in Food Preservation. John Wiley & Sons. ISBN 978-1-119-96202-1.
- Bruinsma, Jelle (2003). World Agriculture: Towards 2015/2030 : an FAO Perspective. Earthscan. ISBN 978-1-84407-007-7.
- Dufour, D.; O'Brien, G. M.; Best, Rupert (1996). Cassava flour and starch: progress in research and development. CIAT. ISBN 978-958-9439-88-3.
- Facts On File, Inc. (2009). Encyclopedia of the Peoples of Africa and the Middle East. Infobase Publishing. ISBN 978-1-4381-2676-0.
- Strange, R.N.; Gullino, Maria Lodovica (28 November 2009). The Role of Plant Pathology in Food Safety and Food Security. Springer Science & Business Media. ISBN 978-1-4020-8932-9.
