= Kivu–Kinshasa Green Corridor =

Democratic Republic of Congo initiative

The Kivu–Kinshasa Green Corridor, also referred to as the “Green Corridor” or the “Congo River Corridor,” is an initiative of the government of the Democratic Republic of the Congo (DRC) that aims to protect a portion of the Congo Basin forest while supporting sustainable economic development. In May 2025, four months after the corridor was established, the DRC government opened a licensing round for 52 new oil blocks covering about 124 million hectares nationally. Mapping analysis by the research group Earth Insight found that the blocks overlap roughly 72% of the Green Corridor, a finding reported by The Guardian. In August 2025 the European Union, which partly funds the corridor, was reported to have advised the DRC against permitting oil drilling inside it. Environmental and Indigenous-rights organisations have called for a moratorium on new extractive projects within the corridor.

== Background ==
The Green Corridor forms part of wider attempts by the DRC government to protect the Congo Basin, which contains the largest continuous area of tropical rainforest in the world and plays a significant role in global climate regulation.

Before the Corridor was proposed, the DRC government and partner organisations implemented an integrated conservation and development model in and around Virunga National Park in eastern DRC, Africa’s oldest national park and one of its most biodiverse protected areas. This arrangement combined biodiversity conservation with investments in renewable energy, agriculture, tourism, and other economic activities.

Supporters link these experiences to reported improvements in wildlife protection and livelihood projects around Virunga, and these formed the basis for scaling up the model to a larger area under the Green Corridor.

== Virunga Alliance model ==
The Green Corridor builds on the model developed around Virunga National Park under the Virunga Alliance.

This approach combined biodiversity conservation with investments in renewable energy, agriculture, fisheries and local enterprise.

The model created over 21,000 jobs in five years, including employment for former militia members, while expanding hydropower generation and supporting local economic activity.

Proponents argue that linking conservation with livelihoods helped stabilise a conflict-affected region and provided a template for scaling up through the Corridor. Extending this model across 41 territories and a landscape estimated at roughly 540,000–544,000 km² introduces significantly greater governance and coordination challenges.

== History ==
The idea of scaling up a conservation-plus-development model from a single park to a national-scale corridor draws directly on the prior experiences of Virunga National Park in eastern DRC. Under what is known as the Virunga Alliance, the Congolese government, working with civil society and private partners, had already begun blending forest protection with investments in renewable energy, agriculture and sustainable livelihoods. This alliance reportedly created over 21,000 jobs in five years, including giving ex-militia members legal employment, and helped build an alternative clean economy in a conflict-affected region.

Buoyed by that relative success and motivated by the growing urgency to protect the globally important but increasingly threatened forests of the Congo Basin, decision-makers began exploring how to replicate the Virunga model at a much larger scale. In late 2024, the country’s parliament approved legislation creating a new type of protected area, a “Community Reserve” that would combine biodiversity conservation with sustainable economic development across a much wider territory.

The formal establishment of the Green Corridor occurred in January 2025. According to official sources, on 15 January 2025 the government issued Ministerial Decree No. 25/01, thereby legally designating the corridor as a protected area under the authority of Institut Congolais pour la Conservation de la Nature (ICCN), the same public agency responsible for national protected areas.

Just a week later, on 22 January 2025, the corridor was publicly unveiled internationally: the announcement was made at the annual meeting of World Economic Forum (WEF) in Davos by President Félix Tshisekedi. The presentation framed the corridor as an ambitious landscape-scale intervention aiming to preserve vast forest and peatland ecosystems while fostering green economic growth, sustainable agriculture and improved livelihoods across the DRC.

As part of the launch, significant international backing was announced. The European Union (EU), under the umbrella of the Team Europe Initiative, to support the corridor’s development, including a first tranche of €42–90 million in grants for sustainable agriculture, renewable energy, logistics and conservation efforts.

Following the official launch, planning began in earnest. By 15 January 2025, the corridor’s spatial footprint was defined: roughly 544,270 km², spanning 41 administrative territories and crossing major axes between eastern and western DRC, including urban areas and rural forest zones. The corridor integrates conservation criteria (protecting intact forests, peatlands and waterways) with socio-economic criteria (potential for sustainable agriculture, renewable energy, and community-based enterprise). In May 2025 a public-private partnership was established between the ICCN and the Virunga Foundation to facilitate the development of the Green Corridor.

By October 2025, early steps toward governance and community involvement were underway. A first nationwide meeting bringing together civil society organisations, local and Indigenous communities, government bodies, researchers, and international donors was held, aiming to build a shared vision and inclusive governance framework for the corridor. The event was organised by a civil-society coalition in partnership with ICCN and the Virunga Foundation.

At the same time, early infrastructural and regional coordination efforts began to materialise. For example, in late 2025, regional authorities in eastern provinces signed agreements to rehabilitate roads and upgrade transport links as part of corridor-related development seen as preliminary steps toward creating the envisioned east-west green economic and trade corridor.

== Ecological Significance ==
The corridor covers approximately 544,270 km² across 41 territories and encompasses intact tropical forest, protected areas, community lands and part of the Congo Basin peatlands. A 2026 spatial analysis by Greenpeace Africa recorded about 31 million hectares of intact forest landscape and 6.5 million hectares of peatland inside the corridor, the latter roughly 12% of its surface area.

The corridor includes a substantial portion of the Cuvette Centrale, the largest tropical peatland complex in the world, which extends over more than 145,000 km² and was estimated in 2017 to store approximately 30 gigatonnes of carbon. Tropical peat releases carbon dioxide and methane when drained or disturbed and is difficult to restore on human timescales once degraded.

The corridor contains 12 Key Biodiversity Areas covering approximately 297,771 km². Species associated with the landscape include the bonobo, Grauer's gorilla, forest elephant, chimpanzee, okapi and Congo peafowl.

== Concerns and Open Questions ==
While the Green Corridor has been widely welcomed for its ambition, several organisations have raised questions about governance and accountability.

In January 2025, Greenpeace Africa cautiously welcomed the initiative but urged the government to ensure that Indigenous peoples remain central to conservation efforts and that inclusive progress is not reversed.

Similarly, Rainforest Foundation UK called for “robust mechanisms” to guarantee inclusiveness and accountability in the Corridor’s governance, highlighting the importance of transparent decision-making and meaningful community participation.

Supporters point to the Community Reserve framework and the requirement for Free, Prior and Informed Consent (FPIC), as well as the decree’s affirmation that existing rights are not extinguished, as safeguards built into the design of the Corridor.

Observers note, however, that effective implementation across more than 540,000 km² will be critical to maintaining legitimacy.

== Oil and Gas Licensing ==
On 2 May 2025, the Congolese Council of Ministers approved the opening of 52 new oil exploration blocks, in addition to three blocks previously awarded to the company CoMiCo, giving a portfolio of 55 blocks. The Guardian reported in July 2025 that the round opened about 124 million hectares of land and inland waters, more than half the country, to oil and gas exploration, including habitat for endangered lowland gorillas and bonobos.

Mapping analysis by Earth Insight, CORAP, Notre Terre Sans Pétrole and Rainforest Foundation UK, found that the blocks overlap 64% of the DRC's remaining intact tropical forest, 8.3 million hectares of protected areas and 8.6 million hectares of Key Biodiversity Areas, and that approximately 39 million people live in or near the areas offered.

The same analysis found that oil blocks overlap approximately 72% of the Kivu–Kinshasa Green Corridor, or about 39 million hectares. Earth Insight's 2025 map analysis records 29 blocks overlapping the corridor, while a 2026 Greenpeace Africa policy brief gives the figure as 28. Virunga National Park was excluded from the 2025 round, although some blocks lie adjacent to protected areas.

Pascal Mirindi, campaign coordinator for the Congolese coalition Notre Terre Sans Pétrole, questioned the coherence of promoting the corridor while offering overlapping oil blocks.

=== International Response ===
In August 2025, the European Union, which partly funds the corridor through the Global Gateway initiative, advised the DRC government against allowing oil drilling within it.

== Mining Concessions ==
In 2026 mining permits recorded in the Congolese mining cadastre overlap approximately 12.3 million hectares of the corridor, about 23% of its area, and that 3.4 million hectares of protected areas within the corridor are affected. This pressure is concentrated in the eastern part of the corridor, where mining activity was already widespread. Because oil blocks and mining permits overlap one another in places, the two shares are not additive.

Approximately 1 million hectares of formally recognised community forest lie within the corridor, and 63% of all community forests recognised across the DRC fall within blocks offered in the 2025 licensing round.

== Consultation and Indigenous Rights ==
Forest communities said they had not been consulted on the corridor. Kapupu Diwa Mutimanwa, president of the League of Indigenous Pygmy Associations of Congo, told Climate Home News: "We have not been consulted about this project." Greenpeace Africa said the project risked perpetuating neo-colonialism and had not respected the principle of community buy-in during planning.

Supporters point to the Virunga Alliance as a model that could be partly replicated, while civil-society representatives continue to press for inclusive and transparent implementation.

== Governance and Legal Concerns ==
Decree No. 25/01, signed on 15 January 2025 by Prime Minister Judith Suminwa, established the corridor and provides that its creation does not create, modify or extinguish any pre-existing right held by local communities or any other third party until zones have been allocated following a public inquiry. Because the category of third parties includes holders of oil, mining and forestry licences, the clause preserves existing extractive rights during the transitional period on the same footing as customary community rights, and that no timetable for the public inquiry had been published.

Under the decree, operational management may be delegated to a public or private body or consortium selected on the basis of financial capacity and experience in conservation and sustainable development, under a public-private partnership, with local communities assigned a consultative role in preparing the management plan. Greenpeace Africa, Rainforest Foundation UK and other environmental groups have called for the application of free, prior and informed consent, citing obligations under Congolese law on the rights of Indigenous Pygmy peoples.

== Calls for a Moratorium ==
In a 2026 policy brief, Greenpeace Africa called for an immediate moratorium on new oil, gas and mining projects within the corridor and for it to be declared a no-go zone for extractive projects; for overlapping oil blocks to be cancelled; for the existing moratorium on new logging concessions to be maintained; for an investment exclusion list to be adopted and published; and for the full implementation of free, prior and informed consent. The Earth Insight report likewise recommended that the 2025 licensing round be cancelled and that donor financing be aligned with the DRC's biodiversity, rights and climate commitments.
