= Congolapia bilineata =

Conservation status
- Least Concern (IUCN 3.1)

Scientific classification
- Kingdom: Animalia
- Phylum: Chordata
- Class: Actinopterygii
- Order: Cichliformes
- Family: Cichlidae
- Genus: Congolapia
- Species: C. bilineata

Binomial name
- Congolapia bilineata (Pellegrin, 1900)

Species of fish

Congolapia bilineata is a fish species belonging to the Cichlidae family. It is found in the central Congo Basin within the western and central Cuvette Centrale region, in both the Democratic Republic of the Congo and the Republic of Congo.

== Status ==
As of 2009, the IUCN has listed Congolapia bilineata as a Least Concern.
