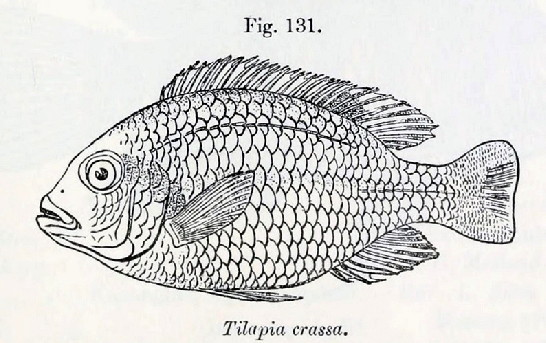

Scientific classification
- Kingdom: Animalia
- Phylum: Chordata
- Class: Actinopterygii
- Order: Cichliformes
- Family: Cichlidae
- Genus: Congolapia
- Species: C. crassa

Binomial name
- Congolapia crassa (Pellegrin, 1903)

= Congolapia crassa =

Species of fish

Congolapia crassa is a species of fish belonging to the family Cichlidae. Congolapia crassa is able to be found in the western central Congo Basin in both Republic of the Congo and Democratic Republic of the Congo.

== Status ==
As of 2024, IUCN has not evaluated Congolapia crassa.
