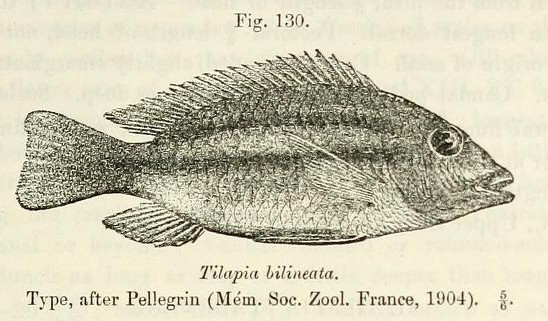
- Congolapia bilineata

Scientific classification
- Kingdom: Animalia
- Phylum: Chordata
- Class: Actinopterygii
- Order: Cichliformes
- Family: Cichlidae
- Tribe: Tilapiini
- Genus: Congolapia; Dunz, Vreven & Schliewen, 2012

Type species
- Tilapia bilineata Pellegrin, 1900

= Congolapia =

Genus of fishes

Congolapia is a genus of cichlids native to Africa and found only in the basin of the Congo River.

== Species ==
There are currently three recognized species in this genus:

- Congolapia bilineata (Pellegrin, 1900)
- Congolapia crassa (Pellegrin, 1903)
- Congolapia louna Dunz, Vreven & Schliewen, 2012
