= Deforestation in the Democratic Republic of the Congo =

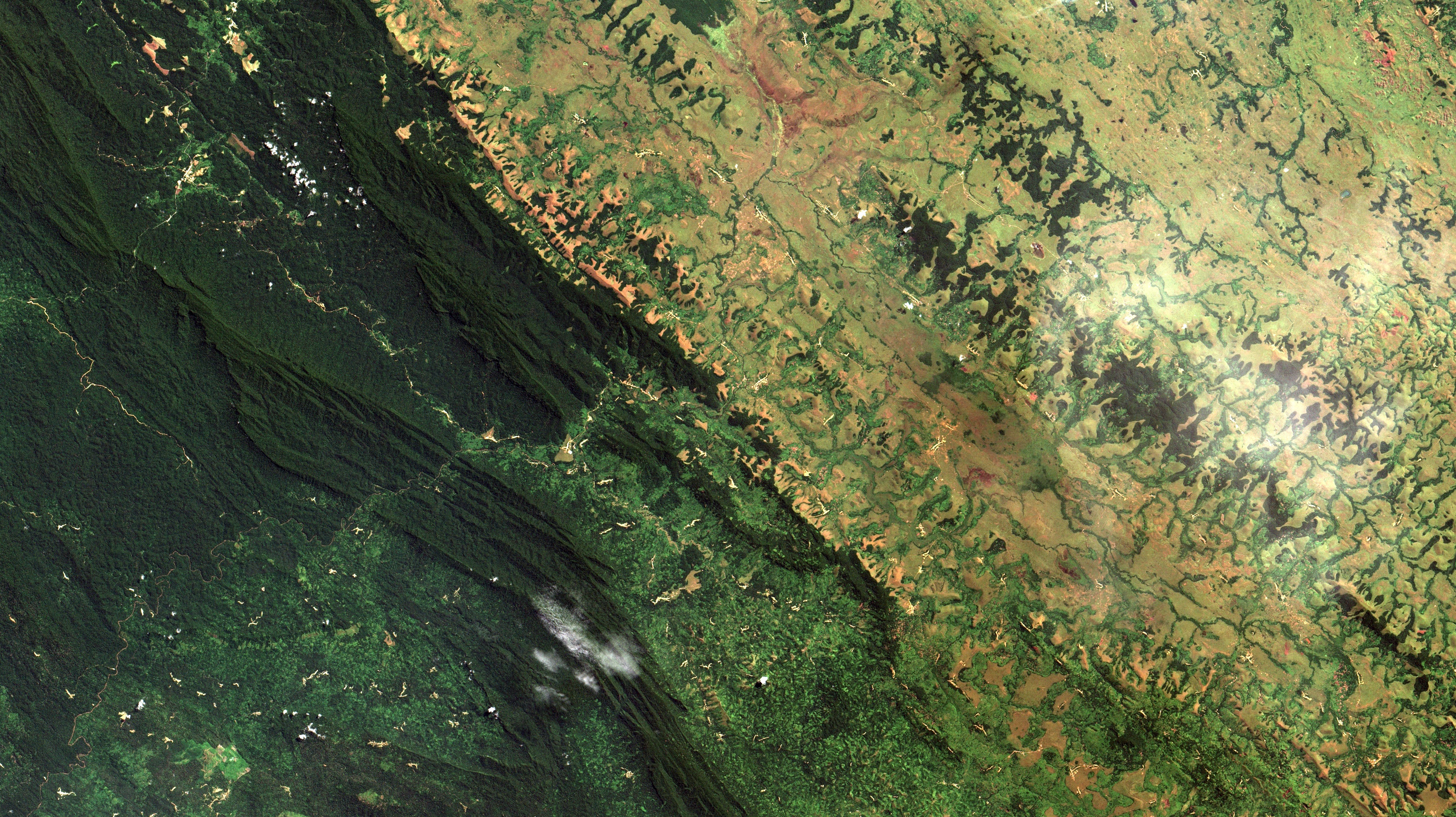
- Deforestation in the triple border of Angola, Congo and DRC. The dense moist forest in dark green is mostly at Angola's Cabinda enclave, from image center to upper left. In light green, deforestation, mostly along Chiloango River, crossing image NE to SW on Congo-DRC border, at image top, and Cabinda-DRC border below. Savanna-forest mosaic with extensive agriculture appears in orange and orangeish light green.
- Country: Democratic Republic of the Congo
- Location: Congo Basin
- Forest type: Rainforest
- Forest area: 154,000,000 ha or 595,000 sq mi
- Deforestation rate: 311,000 ha or 1,200 sq mi annually; 0.2%
- Main causes: Fuelwood and charcoal collection, artisanal and small-scale logging, industrial logging, clearing for agriculture, and road construction.

Deforestation in the Democratic Republic of the Congo (DRC) is an environmental conflict of international importance. Most of the deforestation takes place in the Congo Basin, which has the second largest rainforest in the world after the Amazon. Roughly half the remaining rainforest in the Congo Basin is in the DRC.

There are compounding causes underlying deforestation in the DRC. Trees are slashed and burned for agriculture in the country. Illegal logging, road development and city expansion are also among some of the causes for deforestation.

Deforestation in the DRC leads to biodiversity loss, soil erosion and contributes to climate change. The DRC is one of 17 megadiverse countries, with a significant wildlife that is harmed by habitat loss. For example, 60% of the forest elephant population drop is due to the loss of shelter caused by illegal logging.

From 1990 to 2015, the rate of deforestation in the DRC remained constant at 0.2%, that is 311,000 hectares, or roughly 1,200 square miles, annually. Three reasons have been suggested as to why deforestation rates remained relatively low: 1) the road network within the country has been gradually in decline making access to more remote areas more difficult; 2) political and regulatory changes have disincentivized investment in the country; and 3) agriculture has expanded outside of forest areas.

While the rates of deforestation remained constant, wood removal (measured in cubic meters) continues to increase annually. Industrialized roundwood increased from 3.05 million cubic meters in 1990 to 4.45 million cubic meters in 2010, and fuelwood increased from 44.2 million cubic meters to 75.44 million cubic meters annually in the same period. More recent satellite monitoring indicates that forest loss has accelerated well beyond these earlier estimates: according to data from the University of Maryland released through Global Forest Watch, the DRC lost a record 590,000 hectares of primary forest in 2024, up from 530,000 hectares in 2023, while total tree cover loss reached 1.38 million hectares in 2024. Between 2002 and 2024 the country recorded the third-largest absolute loss of primary forest in the world, after Brazil and Indonesia.

From 2015 to 2019 the rate of tree-felling in the Democratic Republic of Congo doubled.

== Causes of deforestation ==
The direct causes of deforestation within the DRC are well understood and have been identified consistently by many sources. The direct causes are as follows: 1) road infrastructure development, 2) slashing and burning the forests to transform forest land into agricultural land, 3) the collection of fuelwood and charcoal, and lastly 4) unregulated artisanal and small-scale logging. The United Nations Environment Programme has identified the priority in which the causes should be addressed as slash and burn agriculture first, the collection of fuelwood second, unregulated artisanal and logging third, and road infrastructure development fourth.

=== Road construction ===
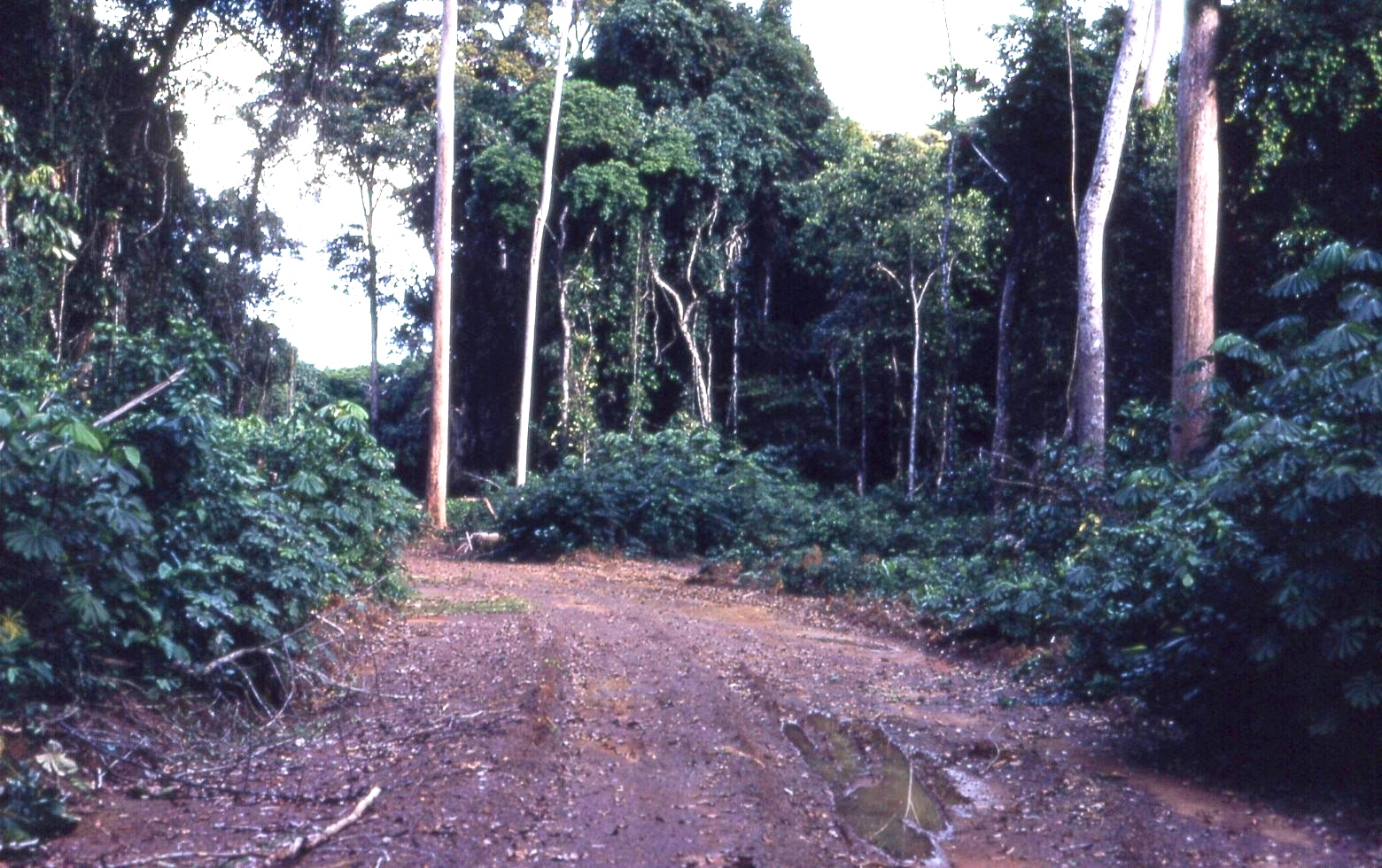
A typical logging road in Africa.

Both mining and logging create similar secondary deforestation through road construction. Specifically, logging companies construct new roads into previously inaccessible forest areas which facilitates the conversion of logged forests into agricultural land. This has led to the immigration of landless farmers, in particular from eastern savanna regions, into primary forest areas through logging roads.

Incoming farmers cause extensive land degradation in converting the natural forest into farmlands. Further, it has been suggested that increases in returns can lead to substantial increase in farm sizes and shortening of the fallow period, which in turn eventually leads to large-scale and severe natural forest area destruction.

=== Transformation into agricultural land ===
The United Nations Environment Programme has identified slash and burn agriculture which produces reduced fallow periods, as the most pressing issue related to the deforestation of the DRC. This is the process of clearing land for agricultural use through burning the forest. This problem has deep roots, as much of the DRC's population is dependent on this sort of slash and burn rain-fed agriculture for their sustenance. Practicing this style of intensive agriculture with short periods of soil rest leads to soil degradation and desertification. This has resulted in more food insecurity, and as much as 70% of the population of the DRC is estimated to be malnourished, according to the Food and Agriculture Organization of the United Nations and World Food Programme.

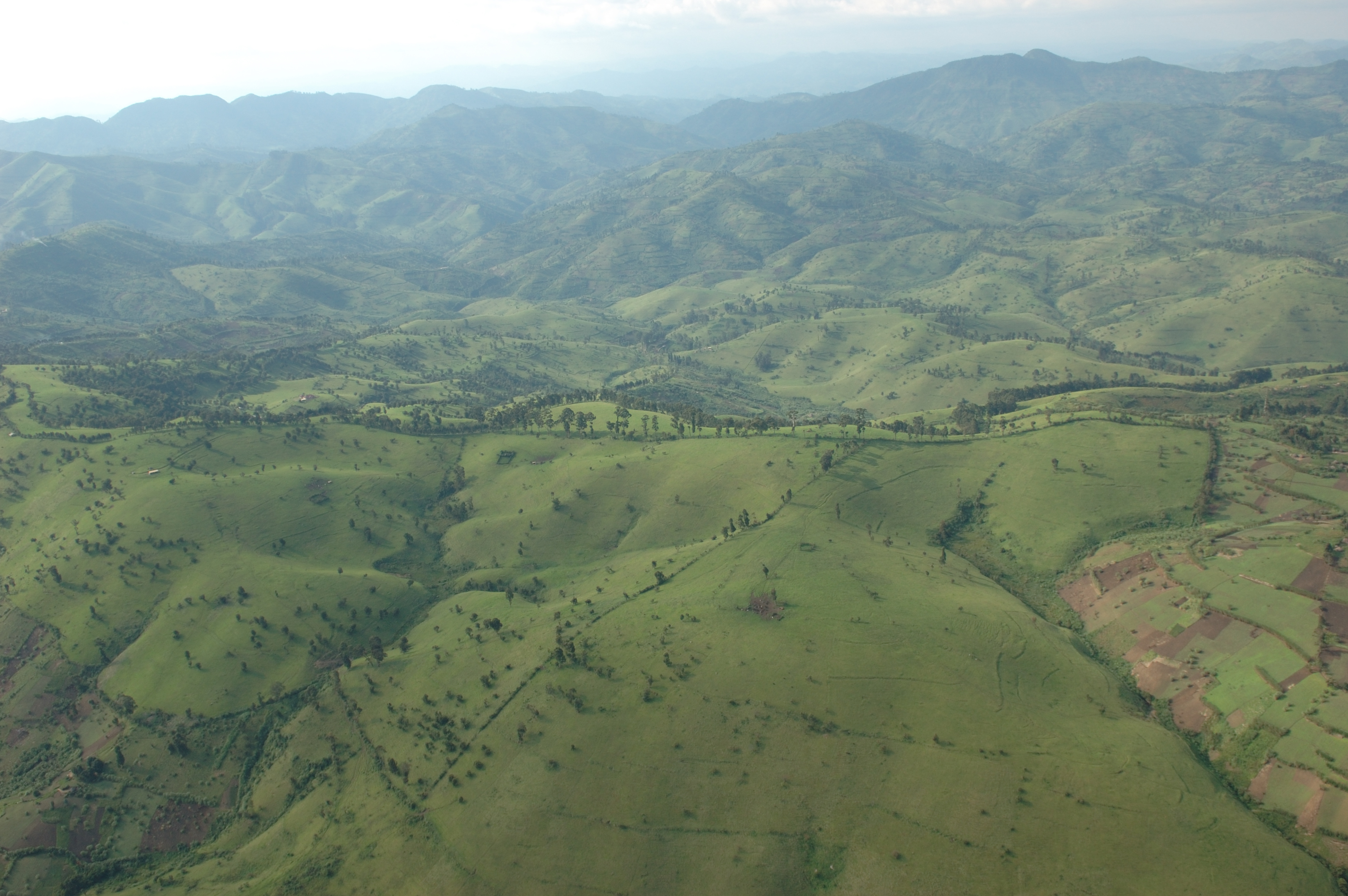
Deforested land in Masisi. The competition for land between herders and farmers is one of the factors feeding the instability in North Kivu.

As the soil degrades and desertification occurs, farmers are forced to continually move farther out to find new land to farm which repeats the process all over again; thereby, farmers are exacerbating the clearing of natural forests. Furthermore, current farming practices are inefficient and unsustainable. When farmers move farther out to workable land, they are further from markets where they can sell their produce. With almost no facilities for refrigeration, post-harvest crop losses can reach up to 80%.

The DRC is heavily reliant on imported food, which further places pressure on the forest lands to be cleared for agricultural purposes. In 2010, the DRC's top import from the United States was meat, while they exported oil resources.

=== Fuelwood and charcoal collection ===
Fuelwood and charcoal collection is a key cause of deforestation, as it supplies 95% the population's energy needs. People's dependence on fuelwood for energy creates rings of fragmented forest around urban areas, which in turn calls for longer and longer forest excursions to collect fuelwood. The United Nations Environment Programme's Post-conflict Environmental Assessment Synthesis for Policy Makers reported that approximately 89 hectares of forest was lost each day due to illegal fuelwood harvesting during the peak of the post-Second Congo War conflict. It is estimated that 72 million m^{3} of fuelwood and charcoal are "produced" annually.

Charcoal, or makala, is inefficient to produce but is a preferred source of energy in the DRC. While it is virtually free to use fuelwood as a source of energy, charcoal increases in popularity as an energy source due to several advantages over fuelwood. Charcoal has higher calorific value per unit weight (31.8 MJ per kg) compared to fuelwood (16 MJ per kg); and charcoal is smaller and easier to store.

Charcoal is also mostly smokeless, and is not damaged by fungi or insects like fuelwood. With these benefits, charcoal is particularly popular in cities. However, even in rural areas in Goma, North Kivu for example, charcoal is also widely used. On average, each person uses 1 to 1.6 cubic meter of fuelwood and 80 to 95 kg of charcoal annually.

Regardless of the purposes, commercial or personal, fuelwood and charcoal are mostly collected by women and children in most regions in Africa. Charcoal costs more in cities, especially large ones such as Kinshasa, because vast amounts of forest are deforested close to the city so transport costs are higher.

=== Artisanal and industrial logging ===
==== Artisanal ====
Logging without a concession from the national government is called artisanal logging. Unregulated artisanal and small-scale logging is estimated to supply 75% of timber exports from the DRC, and happens at a rate 5 to 8 times greater than industrial logging. However, this is still dwarfed by the amount of wood being gathered for fuelwood and charcoal production, which is 30 times greater than artisanal logging. There are three types of forest codes in the DRC—public institutions, private, and community forests. Artisanal logging takes place in community forests.

Community forests are owned by community chiefs or landlords, who have the power to grant small-scale logging concessions that are not regulated by the national government. Many of these community owned forests with artisanal logging are in the northeast. Artisanal logging is profitable, but it is also largely illegal. However, corruption in the local government allows the logging to continue.

To perform artisanal logging, the logger needs to obtain permit from the local government. With approval by the community chief, loggers can obtain a permit; yet, they have to report the harvest to local forestry technicians. These local forestry offices are considered the appropriate entity for approving the logging permits while they do not have the capacity to conduct forest inventory and forest mapping. Since the forest code does not have comprehensive mechanism to stop such logging activities, loggers continue to purchase logging rights from the local community. Depending on the scale of the logging, the community would demand different types of payment from loggers. One community in the North Kivu area, they demanded the logger to give them a 4x4 truck and upgrade the public infrastructures, which are not well provided for by the local government. Although the logger did not accept the request, this illustrates why locals want artisanal logging.

Although artisanal logging provides some income for the community in the short-run, it ultimately does not improve local living conditions. In the end, the communities receive payments which are not large enough to cover the loss of their natural resources. Since there is no monitoring mechanism, the loggers report less logging to pay less tax to the local government. Some loggers cut one tree within the woods and leave the rest intact to mimic natural disturbance. To improve the situation, the DRC government needs better monitoring and better forest code to manage the logging activities.

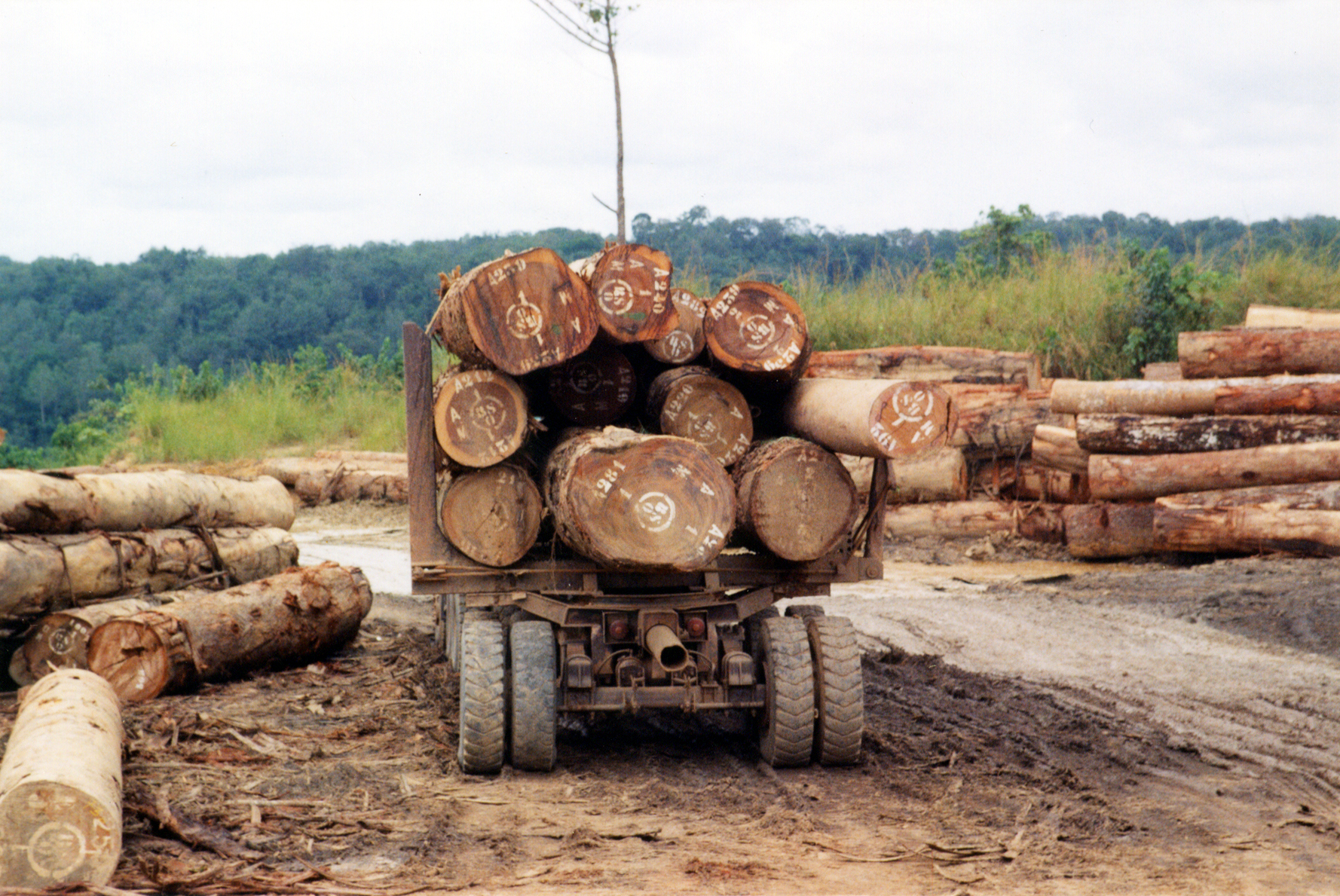
An industrial logging operation in the Congo Basin.

==== Industrial ====
Relative to agricultural land transformation, fuelwood and charcoal collection, and artisanal collection logging, industrial logging has a minor direct impact on forest destruction in the DRC in recent years due to the collapse of local markets in the early 1990s. However, logging has significant indirect effects because of the roads constructed for it. The collapse of the logging industry in the 1990s changed the industry into one of selective logging, where only very large trees of high value are being extracted for export.

As of 1999, 87% of the total volume of wood harvested was one of five species of African mahogany. These selective logging practices yield only 8.7 cubic meters (the volume less than that of one tree) per hectare. Thus many roads are created to move very few trees from the forest. This allows people to move in to collect fuelwood, hunt bushmeat, and start clearing the land for agriculture.

It is important to consider who is driving the demand for industrial logging operations within the DRC and the sustainability of the industry. Currently, an estimated 80% of all timber officially exported by the DRC is brought to the European market. The majority of the exports are shipped to Portugal, Germany, and France. Thus, it is not surprising to see that historically the largest forest concession owner in the DRC had been a German company, Danzer, which held 2.1 million hectares of the active concessions which total 8.2 million hectare (recently this company's subsidiaries who held the logging concessions was sold the American-based Groupe Blattner Elwyn (GBE)).

When looking at the sustainable practices of the large logging companies in the DRC, they are less than sustainable. According to the Forest Stewardship Council (FSC), a leader in certification for sustainable forestry practices, GBE will not be pursuing FSC certification for their practice in the DRC. In addition to the country's major logging companies not pursuing sustainable logging practices, it is commonplace for logging to take place illegally within protected forest areas.

A report by Forests Monitor and Rainforest Foundation published in 2007 found that there is little evidence that industrial logging alleviates poverty, but instead actually contributes to it. This is mainly due to access to forest areas becoming restricted and money not filtering down to local people. "Keeping in mind that the Law only provides for conservation of 15% of the DRC's forests and that more than 40% are earmarked for commercial logging, we still do not know what percentage of Congolese forests are to be returned back to the indigenous communities to enable them to practice their cultural and socio-economic activities" (Byayuwa).

Industrial logging concessions stop indigenous people having access to their forests, which they traditionally rely on for their livelihood through NTFPs (non-timber forest products, such as food products, plants of medicinal value, firewood and fallow fields). In addition to the restricted access to these resources, there are other damaging effects caused by the damage to the water courses that logging can create, which cuts fish resources and water that could be used for crop irrigation.

Industrial logging brings a lot of people in to the area to work for the logging companies, who are often given only short-term contracts. Once these contracts are finished, they then have to find new jobs in the area. This influx of logging workers can create competition for bushmeat resources. For locals who do get jobs with the logging companies, the working conditions can be bad and the pay low, some paying only 50 US cents a day.

== Consequences of deforestation ==
=== Climate change ===
There are two ways that deforestation can cause changes in climate – by changing greenhouse gas emissions and eco-climate impact, or by changing the eco-service patterns, in this case, rainfall. Forests are sinks for carbon. Rainforest, in particular, hold great amounts of carbon with their complex and robust ecosystems. As of 2023 forest within the DRC holds an estimated 23 billion tons of carbon (GtCO2e), which is the largest stock in Africa. The government estimated average annual emissions due to deforestation from 2015 to 2019 at slightly over 1 billion tons. However the 2023 greenhouse gas inventory by the government put 2018 emissions due to forests at about half a billion tons and absorption about the same.

Further, research has demonstrated that increased replacement of tropical rainforest vegetation with savanna grasslands can produce undesired climate changes in Africa. Forests are also providers of rainfall. The destruction of forest prevents such eco-services and leads to changes in landscape. In areas that are heavily deforested, rainfall can decrease throughout the year; and specifically if over deforestation occurs in southern Africa, it may result in increased rainfall in the southern region of the DRC.

This intensifies the loss of topsoil, prevents tall plants from growing back (changing the landscape permanently), and furthers the eco-climate change pattern. Naturally, this change does not only affect plant life but animals as well. Researchers have also begun running simulations to predict future conditions and concluded that great biodiversity loss will result if the DRC continues its current deforestation patterns. The Salonga National Park, for example, stands to lose around 7 species of mammals by 2050, and 19 species by 2080 if the DRC population do not reduce their heat-trapping emissions which result from deforestation.

=== Bushmeat ===
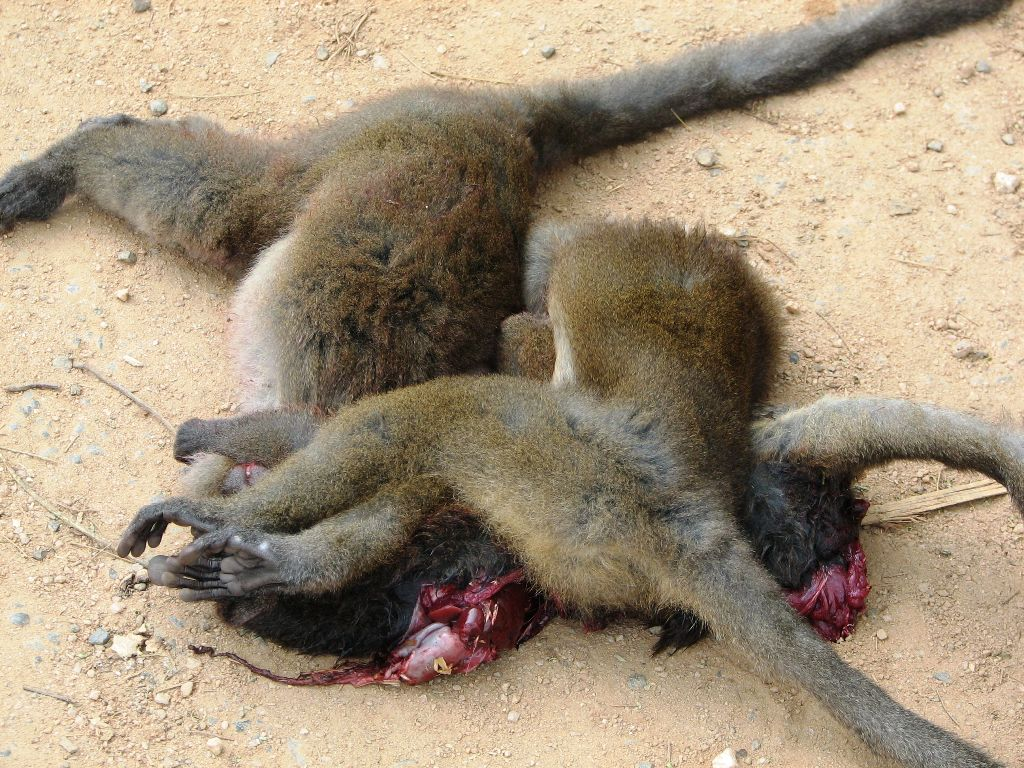
An example of bushmeat, meat that is from the "bush". In the Congo over 1.7 million tons of bushmeat are consumed annually.

While road access has been shown to increase land clearing for farming, it also has other indirect yet significant implications for hunting and the bushmeat trade. Bushmeat is meat from forest wildlife. In Africa, the forest is often referred to as "the bush", thus creating the term bushmeat. In the DRC, most bushmeat is from artiodactyla species and makes up almost 90% of all bushmeat trade. After artiodactyla species, primates are the next largest group at about 5% of all traded bushmeat.

Even elephants, which are known for being hunted for ivory, are targets for the bushmeat trade as a single elephant can provide thousands of kilos of meat which can be easier to sell than its ivory. From 2002 to 2013, the DRC elephant population decreased dramatically from roughly 62,000 to 5,000. In the DRC, with the wide expanses of forest, high income can be obtained from the meat trade; consequently, almost no sort of wildlife protection enforcement can prevent the consumption and trade of bushmeat, which continues to rise.

Road construction for logging and mining decreases the distance hunters have to walk, making what was previously a multi-day trip possible to complete within a day. Additionally it has been shown that as logging increases, wages and demand for bushmeat increases as well; this leads to the increased export of bushmeat from the forest.

Further, loggers themselves consume high amounts of bushmeat, eating it at a rate of two to three times more often than rural families who eat bushmeat roughly two days per week. Logging also allows hunters to kill many more animals on each hunting trip, as the hunters no longer need to carry the dead animals such long distances as logging vehicles can transport the animals.

Currently, it is reported that over 1.7 million tonnes of bushmeat are consumed each year in the DRC at an estimated value of over US$1 billion. The bushmeat trade, besides having a direct effect on the animal populations which are being hunted, has disastrous effects on the ecosystem as a whole. Some of the larger forest carnivores have less prey. Additionally, decreases in the populations of seed-dispersing animals directly affects tree regeneration rates, forest structure, and composition.

=== Soil erosion ===
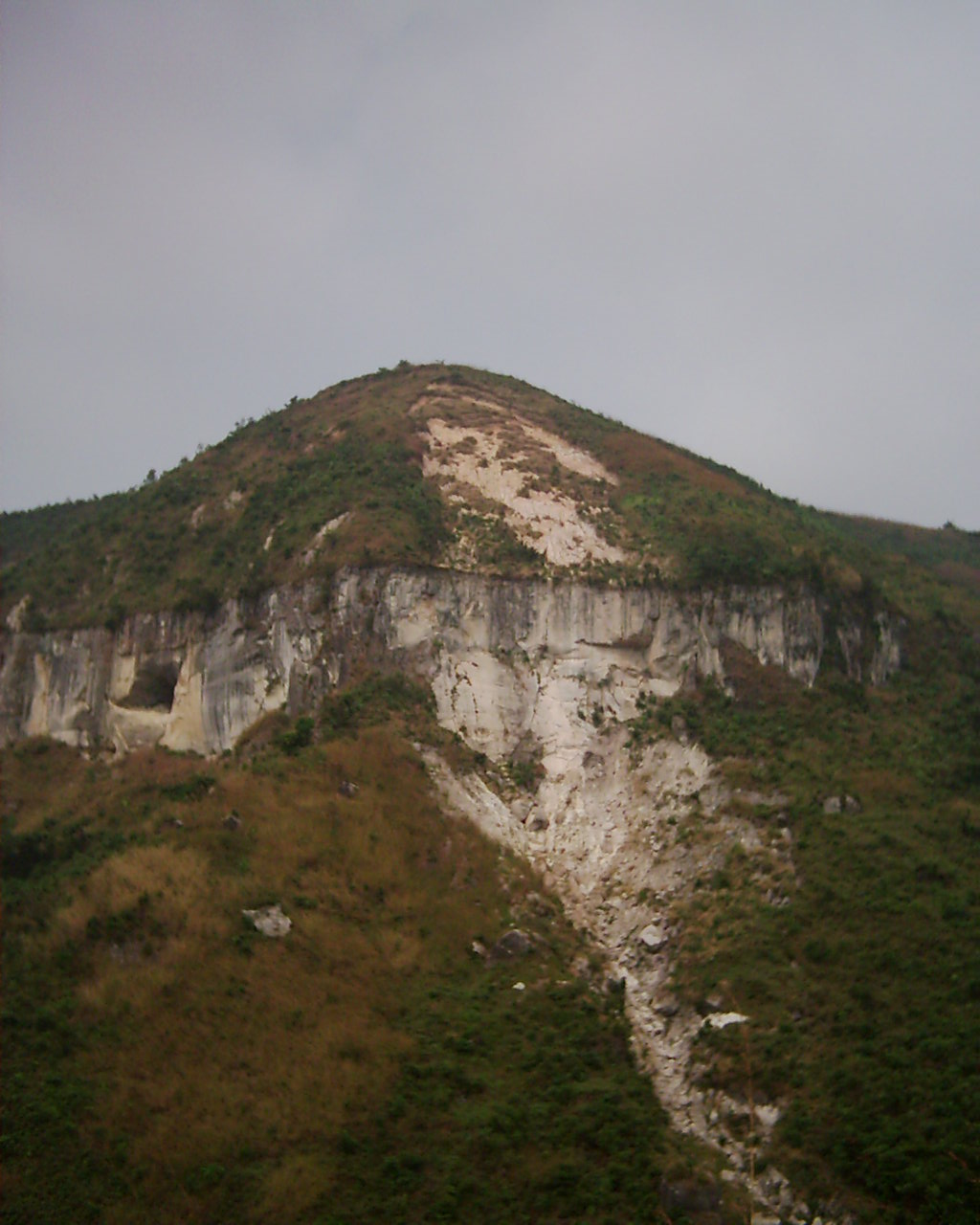
Deforestation leads to serious problems with soil erosion as can be witness at Mont Mangengenge near Kinshasa.

Soil erosion happens in the deforested areas of the DRC, which are mostly in the southern part of the country; and it is most intense in populous cities such as the capital Kinshasa, territory of Luberu, and the surroundings of Kasenyi near southern Lake Albert. Soil erosion has a mixture of causes, including mismanagement of land, climate change, intensive agricultural practice, and lack of adequate protection infrastructure/maintenance for soil.

Land mismanagement is a substantial problem in the DRC and contributes to soil erosion. The cities in DRC have not adopted any new urban plans for decades and now many cities are facing fast urban sprawl which is a major contributor of the deforestation in these areas (via fuelwood and charcoal collection). The city of Kinshasa, for example, is still using the physical environment created from the colonial era but it now has a population of more than 10 million people.

Urbanization is typically associated with more opportunities for employment and economic growth. This is not the case in Kinshasa and other cities in the DRC which are experiencing population stress largely due to migrant refugees coming from the armed conflict zones in the east. As noted by Nelson Mandela, former president of South Africa, the only region in the world where urbanization is associated with negative economic growth in the world is Sub-Saharan Africa.

Due to inadequate infrastructure to accommodate their surging population, informal settlements on the outskirts of the cities are being formed. Many refugees deforest the unexplored land and build squatters settlements, or slums, on the steeps, exploiting many hilly areas. Development of these hilly lands not only increase the rate of erosion but also put the inhabitants vulnerable to the risk of landslide, adding factors of insecurity to the already underprivileged community. Although these settlements are illegal, the government does not have the will nor power to form urban plans, strategies to stop people from migrating, or to regulate the migrants' behavior.

Without formal sources of income, these communities practice slash-and-burn agriculture, resting the land only every 2 to 3 years, to make their ends meet. With intensive agriculture, the lands are quickly depleted and desertified. Without letting the forest regenerate, farmers cut down new forests and in turn expand the amount of desertified land which is very prone to erosion.

Although the problem of soil erosion in these city areas are known, little has been done to address the issue. Few small-scale projects have demonstrated an ability to help protect the integrity of the soil, but no scalable ones have been implemented due to lack of funding. Soil erosion is also considered such a serious matter that the International Atomic Energy Agency (IAEA) has sent agents to inspect the reactor in Kinshasa and concluded that soil erosion could soon threaten the safety of nuclear power plants.

Landscape change can also alter weather patterns. The Congo basin used to be covered by rainforest, yet an expansion of savannah in Central Africa has extending the sandy soil area because of deforestation. The generation of oxygen by forest are contributors to the rainfall system. However, deforestation has disrupted the ecosystem services and created an eco-climate issue. The rainfall pattern in this area has been characterized as a heavy rain season and a severe dry season. The missing forest has intensified the already dichotomy climate, increasing the episodes of violent rainfall and extending the dry season. With long dry spells, the vegetation in these areas can become sparse. This results in no soil protection during the rainy season and creates more soil erosion problems.

== Response ==
Observers in neighboring countries have mixed feelings of the overall deforestation of the Congo Basin. Some fear of famine as "farmers prefer to cut trees down to make charcoal and sell it ... rather than wait two years to harvest a field of cassava". Also as a result of deforestation, hunting has decreased locally as animals are forced to move to new areas. Yet, others view the deforestation as simply a means of survival. Selling firewood can bring the equivalent of $1000 each month for those farmers able to produce one hundred 15-kilo sacks which sell for approximately $10 in most areas.

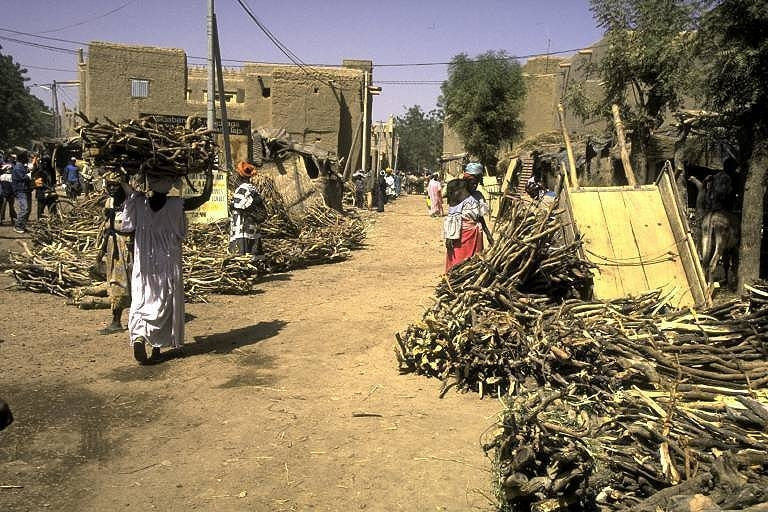
Average citizens of the DRC are reliant on fuelwood as are many citizens across Africa.

Within the DRC, the government has implemented initiatives such as the Agricultural and Rural Sector Rehabilitation Support Project (PARSAR). Yet corruption within the law enforcement sector of the government allows deforestation to continue. Laws have been passed to stop the wholesale demolition of the basin, yet bribes to government officials have been speculated as to the reason why little has changed. Additionally, most of the parties involved in the sale of wood and charcoal are former militiamen, which add elements of fear that a civil war might resume if their products were to be seized.

The international community has taken an interest on this issue. On April 2, 2009, the World Bank's board of directors approved a grant targeted at improving the DRC's Ministry of Environment, Nature Conservation and Tourism to handle forest projects and increase collaboration between civil society, government institutions, and other stakeholders. On July 14, 2011, the World Bank's board of directors approved a Global Environment Facility Trust Fund Grant of $13M to fund a project focused on strengthening the capacities of Congo Basin countries on reducing emissions from deforestation and forest degradation (REDD+) issues.

The REDD campaign aims to extend the usage of ameliorated ovens to about 5 million urban households. Another way the government plans to address the issue of deforestation due to fuelwood is by providing electricity over certain territories to meet 60% of the needs by 2030.

Private organizations such as Mercy Corps and WWF have begun to address the crisis in terms of fuelwood caused deforestation by introducing fuelwood plantations (such as the EcoMakala reforestation project) as well as provide training for rural people to build fuel efficient cooking stoves (i.e. Goma Stove).

Certain organizations are looking into biomass briquette substitution in order to reduce the demand for fuelwood. Sustainable fuelwood production techniques are also being implemented. The EcoMakala reforestation project under the World Wildlife Fund (WWF) has pledged to reforest 4500 ha by 2012 to provide the people of Goma with fuelwood. In the project, the trees are planted on soil belonging to local farmers, with the farmer's permission. The farmer hence becomes owner of the trees, and is able to make his own charcoal from these using a clamp. This amount of wood being planted to offset fuelwood collection is minimal when considering that over 300,000 ha of forest are destroyed each year alone. The REDD campaign is aimed at addressing climate change as all of it projects are working towards an overall world reduction in its emissions by approximately 17 Gt CO_{2}e by 2020 in order to arrive at the GHG atmospheric concentration target of 445 parts per million (pm) of CO_{2}e.

However, research has found that the involvement of international organizations such as the World Bank has aggravated the governance crisis surrounding the DRC forests. The study found that the different incentives provided by the coalitions between international organizations and NGOs was seen as foreign interventions that went against the interests of local bureaucracies.

It is unclear how these efforts help in stopping deforestation. With citizens so dependent on fuelwood and charcoal for their energy basic needs (i.e. cooking) and livelihood, until the country is able to provide citizens with alternative sources of energy (i.e. electricity and alternative jobs) the situation will likely not improve. Some jobs have recently become available through projects undertaken by the Virunga Alliance. These include a hydroelectric plant, (Virunga Energies), a chocolate factory (Virunga Origins Chocolate) and a soap factory. There is also chia seed factory nearby.

Preliminary agreements have been reached between the Minister for the Environment of the DRC and the European Union Commission to launch a program named Forest Law Enforcement, Governance and Trade agreement (FLEGT). This program aims to develop a system to improve the traceability and ensure legality of wood being imported to Europe. The use of independent observer programs of forest law enforcement and governance (IM-FLEG), carried out by organizations such as Resource Extraction Monitoring, can enhance the credibility of timber legality verification, and supports the efforts of those governments officially committed to cleaning up corruption in the sector.

In August 2021 UNESCO removed the Salonga National Park from its list of threatened sites. Forbidding oil drilling, reducing poaching played crucial role in the achievement. The event is considered as a big win to Democratic Republic of the Congo as the Salonga forest is the biggest protected rainforest in Africa. African intact rainforests absorb CO_{2} better than the rainforests of South America and Asia.

== Tree cover extent and loss ==
Global Forest Watch publishes annual estimates of tree cover loss and 2000 tree cover extent derived from time-series analysis of Landsat satellite imagery in the Global Forest Change dataset. In this framework, tree cover refers to vegetation taller than 5 m (including natural forests and tree plantations), and tree cover loss is defined as the complete removal of tree cover canopy for a given year, regardless of cause.

For the Democratic Republic of the Congo, country statistics report cumulative tree cover loss of 21,072,346 ha (210,723.46 km^{2}) from 2001 to 2024 (about 10.6% of its 2000 tree cover area). For tree cover density greater than 30%, country statistics report a 2000 tree cover extent of 199,272,120 ha (1,992,721.2 km^{2}). The charts and table below display this data. In simple terms, the annual loss number is the area where tree cover disappeared in that year, and the extent number shows what remains of the 2000 tree cover baseline after subtracting cumulative loss. Forest regrowth is not included in the dataset.

Annual tree cover loss in the Democratic Republic of the Congo, 2001–2024. View chart definition.
Tree cover extent in 2000 minus cumulative tree cover loss in the Democratic Republic of the Congo, 2001–2024 (loss-only residual; does not account for gain). View chart definition.

Annual tree cover extent and loss
Year	Tree cover extent (km2) (Note: This residual measure does not include forest regrowth.)	Annual tree cover loss (km2)
2001	1,988,165.88	4,555.32
2002	1,983,021.30	5,144.58
2003	1,980,275.17	2,746.13
2004	1,976,274.72	4,000.45
2005	1,971,422.36	4,852.36
2006	1,966,890.35	4,532.01
2007	1,962,262.60	4,627.75
2008	1,958,213.48	4,049.12
2009	1,951,859.13	6,354.35
2010	1,943,740.38	8,118.75
2011	1,939,445.73	4,294.65
2012	1,933,124.92	6,320.81
2013	1,923,917.43	9,207.49
2014	1,910,533.81	13,383.62
2015	1,901,248.79	9,285.02
2016	1,887,433.76	13,815.03
2017	1,872,751.89	14,681.87
2018	1,859,013.63	13,738.26
2019	1,846,811.22	12,202.41
2020	1,833,708.84	13,102.38
2021	1,821,228.24	12,480.60
2022	1,809,026.02	12,202.22
2023	1,795,775.82	13,250.20
2024	1,781,997.74	13,778.08

== REDD+ forest reference emission level and monitoring ==
The DRC has submitted a national forest reference emission level (FREL) under the UNFCCC REDD+ framework, which was subject to a UNFCCC technical assessment. On the UNFCCC REDD+ Web Platform, the country's reference level is listed as "assessed"; a safeguards information summary (linked to reporting on the Cancún safeguards) and a national forest monitoring system are also listed as "reported", while the national strategy is listed as "not reported".

In its 2018 submission (as modified during the assessment), the Democratic Republic of the Congo proposed a national FREL covering the REDD+ activity "reducing emissions from deforestation", using a historical reference period of 2000–2014 and a linear extrapolation approach for the monitoring period that followed. The technical assessment notes that the FREL included CO2 emissions from above-ground and below-ground biomass, while excluding deadwood, litter, and soil organic carbon (as well as non-CO2 gases), with explanations provided for these omissions and a stepwise improvement pathway linked to expanding national data (including the national forest inventory).

The assessed FREL was established as a time-varying benchmark for 2015–2019, averaging 1,078,235,017.8 t CO2 eq per year over that five-year monitoring period. In its technical annex on REDD+ results (submitted with its first biennial update report) and the subsequent UNFCCC technical analysis, the Democratic Republic of the Congo reported average emission reductions from deforestation of 524,240,000 t CO2 eq per year for 2015–2018, measured against the assessed FREL.

== See also ==
- Fair trade cocoa
- Emmanuel de Merode
- Shea butter
- Mining industry of the Democratic Republic of the Congo
