= Congolapia louna =

Conservation status
- Not evaluated (IUCN 3.1)

Scientific classification
- Kingdom: Animalia
- Phylum: Chordata
- Class: Actinopterygii
- Order: Cichliformes
- Family: Cichlidae
- Genus: Congolapia
- Species: C. louna

Binomial name
- Congolapia louna Dunz, Vreven & Schliewen, 2012

Species of fish

Congolapia louna is a species of fish belonging to the family Cichlidae. Unlike other Congolapia species, Congolapia louna is only known in the Louna River making it an endemic fish in the Republic of the Congo.

== Status ==
As of 2024, the IUCN has not evaluated Congolapia louna.
