= Resource Extraction Monitoring =

- Founded: 2003
- Type: Non-governmental organization
- Purpose: Natural resource extraction
- Location: Cambridge, UK
- Region served: Global
- Method: Independent forest monitoring, capacity building
- Website: www.rem.org.uk

Resource Extraction Monitoring (REM) is a non-profit organisation that provides independent monitoring to ensure that laws relating to the extraction of natural resources are enforced. It was founded in 2003 by experts with over 15 years of monitoring experience. The head office is in the UK, with local offices in countries where major projects are taking place.

The organisation bridges the gap between governments, environmental and human rights NGOs and local communities, donors and the private sector by providing objective and timely information on natural resource allocation and use. REM is not a lobbying organisation and has no political agenda, but is pro-active in researching and presenting the issue of governance and transparency during project implementation.

== Activities ==
Resource Extraction Monitoring and partner organization, Forests Monitor, are monitoring forest exploitation in the Democratic Republic of the Congo (DRC). This project is now in its second phase. REM was appointed the Independent Monitor of Forest Law Enforcement and Governance in the DRC for a duration of 25 months, starting from December 2010.

The organisation also has projects in other countries, including:

- Cameroon
- Liberia
- Republic of Congo
- Sri Lanka
- Tanzania

== See also ==
- Illegal logging
- Independent Forest Monitoring
