= African teak =

African teak is a common name for several plants and may refer to:

- Baikiaea plurijuga, native to the northern Kalahari
- Milicia excelsa, also known as iroko, native to Africa from the Ivory Coast to Ethiopia and south to Angola and Mozambique
- Pericopsis elata, also known as afrormosia, native to western Africa from the Ivory Coast to the Democratic Republic of the Congo (DRC)
- Pterocarpus angolensis, native to southern Africa from Tanzania and the DRC south to South Africa

== Gallery ==
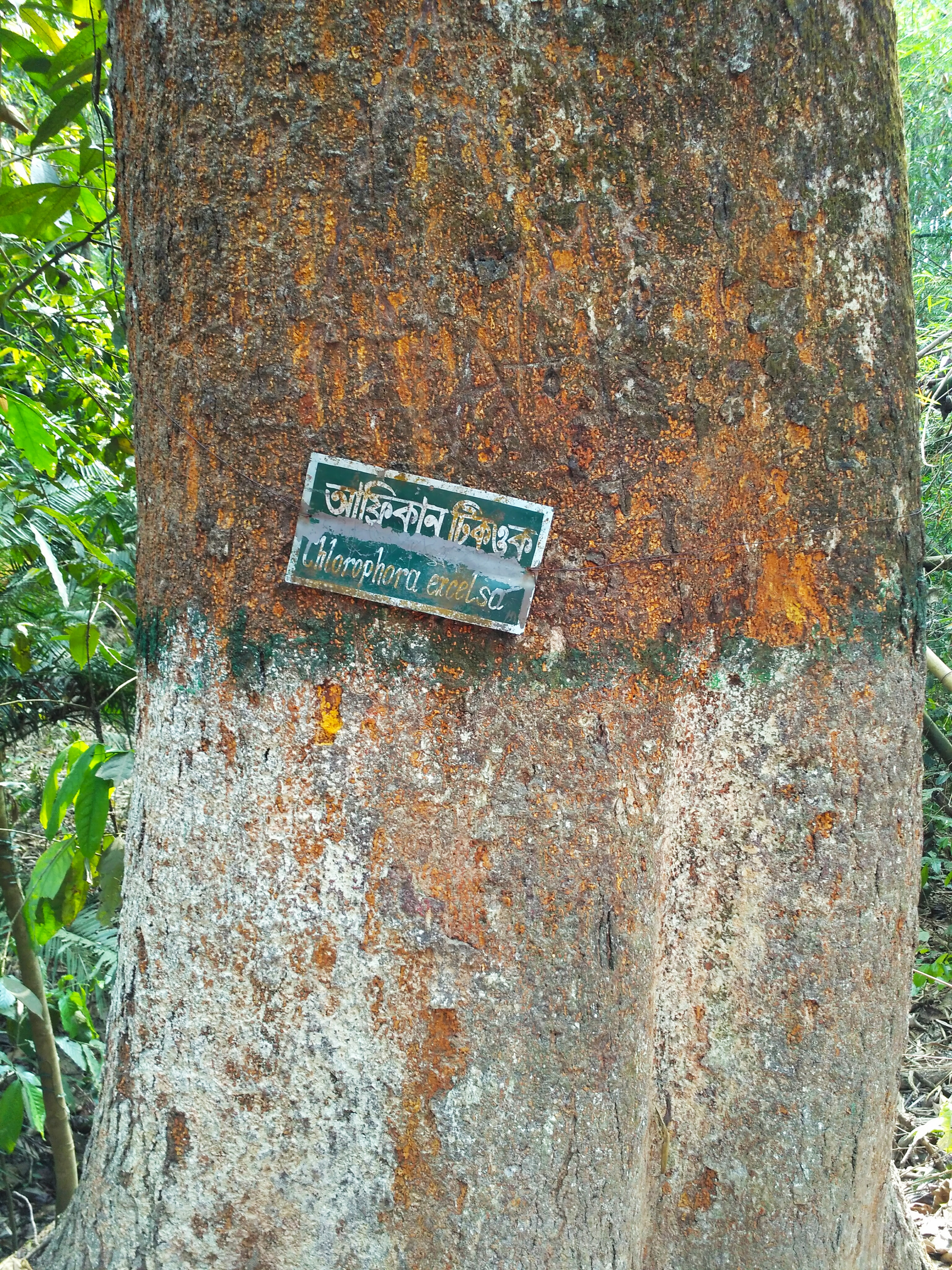
View of a trunk of African teak, Milicia excelsa (Chlorophora excelsa) in Lawachara National Park, Bangladesh. 2016.
