= Cuvette Centrale =

Region in the Democratic Republic of the Congo

The Cuvette Centrale (French: "Central Basin") is a region of forests and wetlands in the Democratic Republic of the Congo. Some definitions consider the region to extend into the Republic of the Congo as well. It lies in the center of the Congo Basin, bounded on the west, north and east by the arc of the Congo River.

== Description ==
A lake covered the region during the Pliocene epoch, which was gradually filled with sediments, and the surface of the basin is very flat. Slow-moving tributaries of the Congo, including the Lopori, Maringa, Ikelemba, Tshuapa, Lomela and Lokoro, drain westward.

The region lies on the equator, where the climate is tropical and humid. Rainfall averages 2,000 mm annually.

The Eastern Congolian swamp forests extend along the Congo River and its chief tributaries, and cover wide areas in the western portion of the Cuvette Centrale. These swamp forests are seasonally or permanently flooded. The Central Congolian lowland forests extend across the remaining portion of the region. The swamp forests are home to endangered species of megafauna, including lowland gorillas and forest elephants.

== Climate change ==
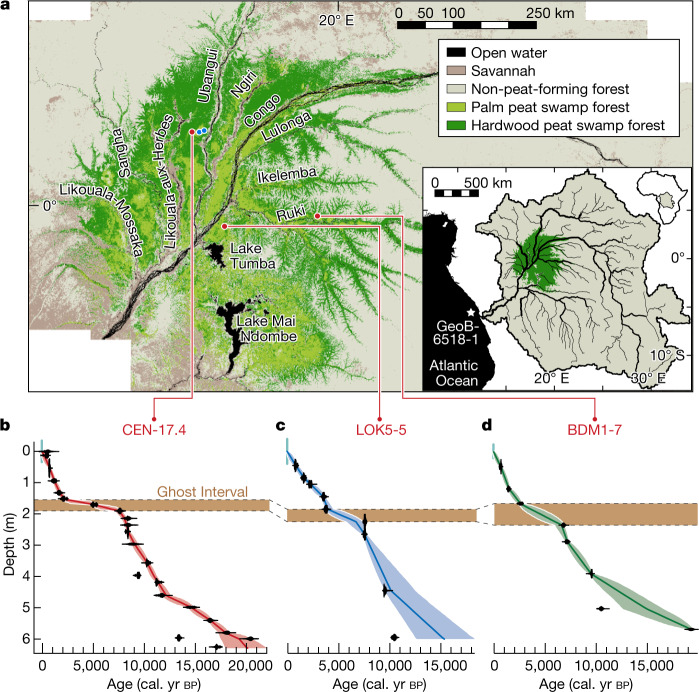
Map of Cuvette Centrale location in the Congo Basin. Three graphs portray the evolution of its peatland carbon content over the past 20,000 years, as reconstructed from three peat cores.

In 2017, it was discovered that 40% of the Cuvette Centrale wetlands are underlain with a dense layer of peat, which contains around 30 petagrams (billions of tons) of carbon. This amounts to 28% of all tropical peat carbon, equivalent to the carbon contained in all the forests of the Congo Basin. In other words, while this peatland only covers 4% of the Congo Basin area, its carbon content is equal to that of all trees in the other 96%. It was then estimated that if all of that peat burned, the atmosphere would absorb the equivalent of 20 years of current United States carbon dioxide emissions, or three years of all anthropogenic CO_{2} emissions.

This threat prompted the signing of Brazzaville Declaration in March 2018: an agreement between Democratic Republic of Congo, the Republic of Congo and Indonesia (a country with longer experience of managing its own tropical peatlands) aiming to promote better management and conservation of this region. However, 2022 research by the same team which had originally discovered this peatland not only revised its area (from the original estimate of 145,500 square kilometres (56,200 sq mi) to 167,600 square kilometres (64,700 sq mi)) and depth (from 2 m (6.6 ft) to (1.7 m (5.6 ft)) but also noted that only 8% of this peat carbon is currently covered by the existing protected areas. For comparison, 26% of its peat is located in areas open to logging, mining or palm oil plantations, and nearly all of this area is open for fossil fuel exploration.

Even in the absence of local disturbance from these activities, this area is the most vulnerable store of tropical peat carbon in the world, as its climate is already much drier than that of the other tropical peatlands in the Southeast Asia and the Amazon rainforest. A 2022 study suggests that the geologically recent conditions between 7,500 years ago and 2,000 years ago were already dry enough to cause substantial peat release from this area, and that these conditions are likely to recur in the near future under continued climate change. In this case, Cuvette Centrale would act as one of the tipping points in the climate system at some yet unknown time.
