= Bus Bloc =

Concession in the Congo Free State

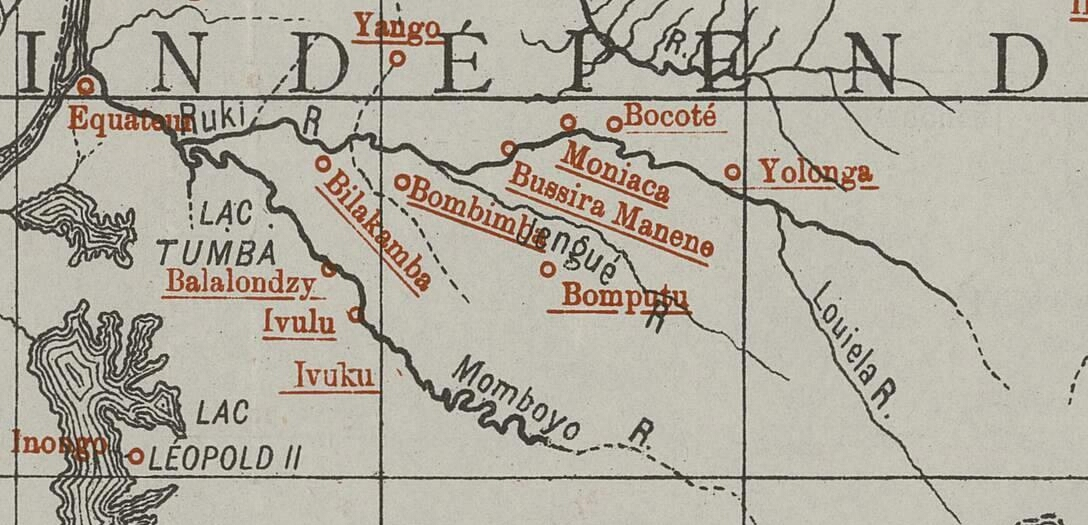
SAB Bus Bloc posts in an 1894 map. The upper Ruki River above the Momboyo River was also called the Busira River

Location in the Congo

The Bus Bloc, or Bloc de la Busira-Momboyo, was a huge concession in the Congo Free State, later the Belgian Congo, operated by the Société anonyme belge pour le commerce du Haut-Congo (SAB). It covered land along and between the Busira River and Momboyo River. In the early days the SAB exploited the local people ruthlessly in their demands for rubber, and many died.

== SAB trading posts ==
As of 1 January 1894 the Société anonyme belge pour le commerce du Haut-Congo (SAB) had 83 factories and posts, including some in the French territory to the west of the Congo and Ubangi rivers. A map shows the company had posts along the upper Ruki River (i.e. the Busira) at Bilakamba, Bombimba, Bussira Manene, Moniaca, Bocoté and Yolongo. It also had a post at Bomputu on the Lengué (Salonga) River, and posts at Balalondzy, Ivulu and Ivuku on the Momboyo River. The post at Monieka formally established in 1901.

== Concessions ==
The Compagnie du Congo pour le Commerce et l'Industrie (CCCI) was given the right to 150,000 hectares (120,000 acres) of land in return for its services in studying the Matadi-Léopoldville Railway project. 138,000 hectares (340,000 acres) of the CCCI concession was in the general area of the Bus Bloc, but of this 123,000 hectares (300,000 acres) were outside its future boundaries. The SAB had a block of 2,000 hectares (4,900 acres) in the future Bus Bloc.

The Compagnie du chemin de fer du Congo (CFC) was given 1,500 hectares (3,700 acres) of land for every 1 kilometre (0.62 mi) of line put into operation, as well as a strip 200 metres (660 ft) wide along the railway. The CFC chose 11,500 hectares (28,000 acres) within the future Bus Bloc, and as of 1901 still had 539,326 hectares (1,332,700 acres) unallocated. In an agreement of 9 November 1901 the Congo Free State agreed to allocate the CFC's remaining 539,326 hectares in an area between the Salonga and Busira rivers, and to add another 500,000 hectares (1,200,000 acres), as long as this included the 168,512 hectares (416,400 acres) already allocated in the Busira-Momboyo basin, forming a single bloc.

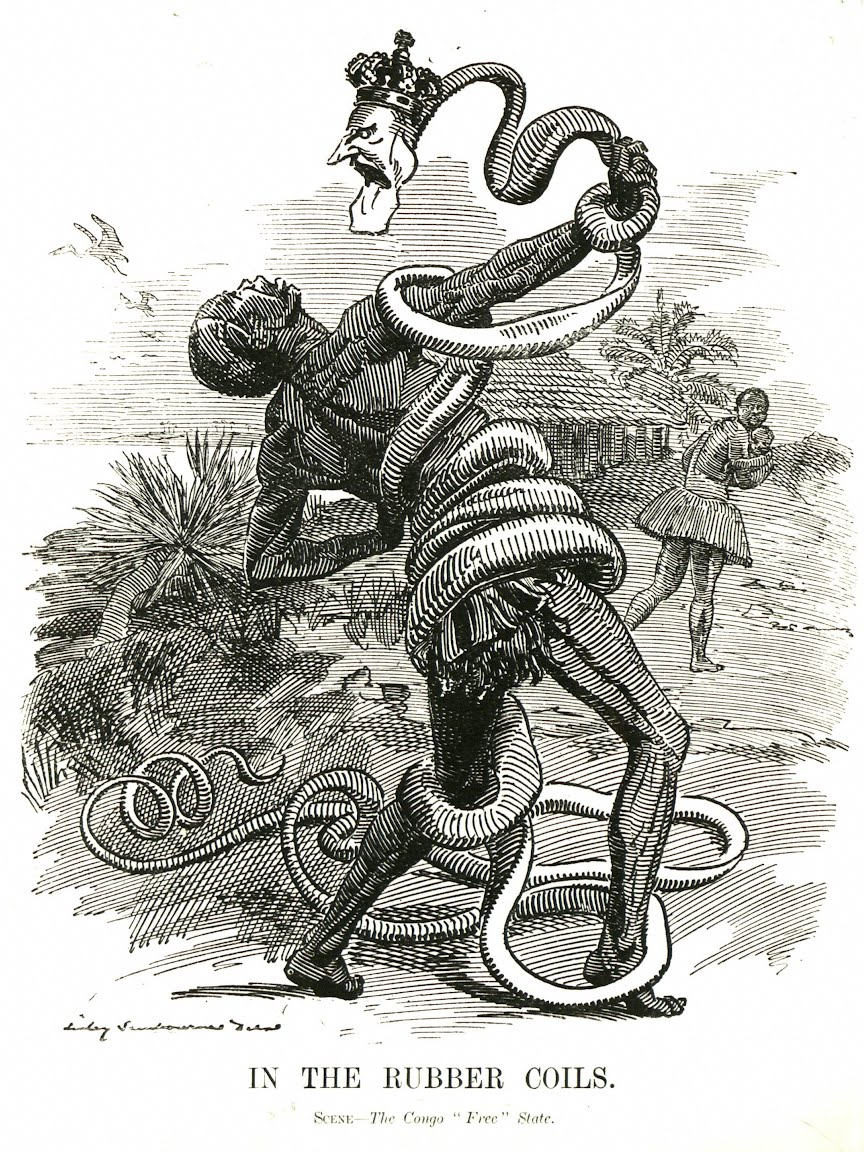
1906 Punch cartoon depicting Leopold II of Belgium as a snake attacking the Congo people

It took some time to settle on the limits of the bloc, which were finally established in an agreement on 13 December 1904. The expansion by 500,000 hectares was reduced to 333,535 hectares (824,180 acres), giving a total area of 1,041,373 hectares (2,573,290 acres). The state took back some of the land outside the bloc, but left the Busira-Manene plantations. The CFC held the bulk of the land, while the CCCI had two sections of 123,000 hectares (300,000 acres) and 15,000 hectares (37,000 acres) and the SAB had a small section of 12 hectares (30 acres). Some land was reserved for a native people or for public use.

== History ==
Under the agreement of 27 December 1901 the SAB was responsible for industrial, agricultural and commercial exploitation of the Bloc and received a share of the proceeds in compensation. Property rights were shared, with the CFC getting half and the CCCI and SAB each getting a quarter. Between 1902 and 1910 the SAB sublet most of its activities to the Compagnie du Kasaï and Société du Busira concession companies. After this, SAB began to expand again as the concession system was gradually phased out. In 1911 Charles Batjoens headed a mission to delimit the Bus Bloc at Bussanga (Equateur).

The Belgians treated the local people brutally and forced them to extract rubber in appalling conditions. It is estimated that hundreds of thousands died as victims to the agents of the Anglo-Belgian India Rubber Company (ABIR) or of the SAB in the Bus-Bloc. The American doctor Louis Jaggard (1877–1951) at the Monieka mission spoke in 1917 with scorn of the 30 or so traders at Bussira, 4 miles (6.4 km) away, who came to him for treatment. He called them "low down white trash". A rebellion that began in Sankuru in 1920 spread to the SAB's Bus Bloc concession on the Upper Busira. The rebels attacked state posts, trading stations, factories, homes and a Catholic chapel. The military arrived in March 1921 and over the next five months killed at least 115 rebels.

On 21 March 1927 the SAB received all the land rights in the bloc. The capital and number of shares in the SAB was increased, and the CCCI and CFC were compensated with shares in SAB. On 26 June 1937 the Bus Bloc was returned to the state, a huge area of 1,041,773 hectares (2,574,280 acres). The SAB was compensated financially and in land. On 19 October 1937 the entire area was opened to free trade.

== Sources ==
- Batjoens, Charles, Africa Museum
- Boelaert, E.; Vinck, H.; Lonkama, Ch. (1996), "Arrivée des blancs sur les bords des riviéres equatoriales (Partie II et fin)", Annales Aequatoria (in French), 17, Honoré Vinck: 7–416, JSTOR 25837249
- De Roo, Bas, Negotiating colonial tariff policies. Customs and commerce in the Congo (1886–1914) (PDF) (thesis)
- Hayes, Th. (Jan–May 1940), "La politique des concessions foncieres au congo belge" (PDF), Revue d'histoire moderne, Nouv. Ser. Tome 9: Etudes sur l'histoire de Belgique, 15e (41/42), Societe d'Histoire Moderne et Contemporaine: 88–104, JSTOR 20525978
- Heyse, T. (1938), "Section des sciences morales et politiques" (PDF), Bulletin des séances (in French), IX, Institut Royal Colonial Beige
- Heyse, Th. (January–May 1940), "La politique des concessions foncieres au congo belge", Revue d'histoire moderne, Nouv. Ser. Tome 9: Etudes sur l'histoire de Belgique (in French), 15e (41/42), Societe d'Histoire Moderne et Contemporaine: 88–104, JSTOR 20525978
- Hunt, Nancy Rose (2015), A Nervous State: Violence, Remedies, and Reverie in Colonial Congo, Duke University Press, ISBN 978-0-8223-7524-1
- Kanyarwunga, Jean I.N., République Démocratique du Congo. Les générations condamnées., Jean I. N. KANYARWUNGA, GGKEY:XXKYNRXTHAH
- "Map: Société anonyme belge pour le commerce du Haut-Congo : emplacement des 83 factoreries et postes au 1er janvier 1894", Mouvement géographique, Brussels: Institut national de géographie, 28 October 1894
