= Lotoko, Democratic Republic of the Congo =

Lotoko
- Village
- Location within Democratic Republic of the Congo
- Coordinates: 0.291006°S 19.871921°E -->
- Country: Democratic Republic of the Congo
- Province: Sankuru
- Territory: Ingende Territory
- Collectivity: Eungu
- Elevation: 325 m (1,066 ft)

Lotoko is a community on the Busira River in the Province of Équateur in the Democratic Republic of the Congo. In the colonial period it held a trading post.

== Location ==
Lotoko is on the south shore of the Busira River in the Province of Équateur about 2 kilometres (1.2 mi) downstream from the point where the Salonga River joins the Busira from the left. It is in Ingende Territory. It is at an elevation of about 325 metres (1,066 ft).

== Colonial era ==
Lotoko was a post of the Société anonyme belge pour le commerce du Haut-Congo (SAB) in the Mbala–Londji territory, near the villages of the Lingoy chiefdom. "Lotoko" is the name of a group of Mongo people. The trading posts and missions were often given the same name as the local people.

The Belgians were brutal in collecting rubber. An account by a local person of SAB activities in collecting rubber (caoutchouc or CTC) says,

After the White of the State, Bafutamingi, arrived in Lotoko, he again imposed the CTC. Each village was to bring six baskets. He imprisoned those who did not give satisfaction, but he did not kill. Bafutamingi was replaced on his departure by Njete Mabe who continued with the CTC. Njete Mabe left. The White Isweswe arrived for the CTC levy. If the harvest decreases, he arrests you. Sometimes he kills without any form of process. He left and the White Moto arrived. He asks for the CTC in the huts, each his own, as a tax. Who does not have goes to jail. During this period he also sent riflemen to kill people. Then Moto left. It is the end of the CTC. The end of fighting. The beginning of joy. The return of games and the tax.

== Sources ==
- Boelaert, E.; Vinck, H.; Lonkama, Ch. (1996), "Arrivée des blancs sur les bords des riviéres equatoriales (Partie II et fin)", Annales Aequatoria (in French), 17, Honoré Vinck: 7–416, JSTOR 25837249
- Hulstaert, Gustaaf (1992), "Onomastique Mongo", Annales Aequatoria (in French), 13, Honoré Vinck: 161–275
- Lederer, A. (1973), L'exploitation des affluents du Zaïre et des ports de l'intérieur de 1960 à 1971 (PDF) (in French), Académi e royal e des Sciences d'Outre-Mer: Classe des Sciences Techniques, N.S., XVII-6, Bruxelles
- "Lotoko", Geonames
- Lufungula Lewono, Stanislas (2006), "Les aabus de l'éxploitation du caoutchouc: Le cas des chefs Bonkosi et Boyenge de la Chefferie de Lingoy au Congo belge", Annales Aequatoria (in French), 27, Honoré Vinck: 103–126
- "Territoire d'Ingende" (PDF), Reliefweb (map) (in French), 3 March 2020
