= Monieka =

- Village
- Location within Democratic Republic of the Congo
- Coordinates: 0.21031°S 20.05438°E -->
- Country: Democratic Republic of the Congo
- Province: Équateur
- Territory: Bolomba Territory

Monieka is a community on the Busira River in the Province of Équateur in the Democratic Republic of the Congo. In the colonial period it held a trading post and a Protestant mission.

== Location ==
Monieka is on the north shore of the Busira River in Bolomba Territory of the Province of Équateur. It faces the Boende Territory in Tshuapa province to the south of the river. It lies between Busira to the west and Bokote to the east. It is at an elevation of about 339 metres (1,112 ft). The village gives its name to the Monieka Health Zone.

== Precolonial era ==
As was common in the area, the fishing village of Monieka was paired with the farming village of Ekonda-Moke, and the two villages traded their produce. The people came together for dances, games and festivals, and intermarried.

== Colonial era ==
The Belgians arrived towards the end of the 19th century in a steamboat. At first the local people tried to drive them away, but quickly learned the superior power of modern guns. The Belgians used extreme force to compel the villages along the Busira to gather rubber, often killing those who resisted or fell short of quotas. As of 1 January 1894 the Société anonyme belge pour le commerce du Haut-Congo (SAB) had 83 factories and posts, including some in the French territory to the west of the Congo and Ubangi rivers. A map shows the company had posts along the upper Ruki River (i.e. the Busira) at Bilakamba, Bombimba, Bussira Manene, Moniaca, Bocoté and Yolongo. It also had a post at Bomputu on the Lengué (Salonga) River, and posts at Balalondzy, Ivulu and Ivuku on the Momboyo River. The post at Monieka formally established in 1901.

The Protestants established a mission at Monieka in 1912. The American doctor Louis Jaggard (1877–1951) at the Monieka mission spoke in 1917 with scorn of the 30 or so traders at Bussira, 4 miles (6.4 km) away, who came to him for treatment. He called them "low down white trash". A rebellion that began in Sankuru in 1920 spread to the SAB's Bus Bloc concession on the Upper Busira. The rebels attacked state posts, trading stations, factories, homes and a Catholic chapel. The military arrived in March 1921 and over the next five months killed at least 115 rebels.

A 1947 account described Monieka as an 89 acres (36 ha) clearing holding a bush mission founded and operated by the Disciples of Christ from Indianapolis in the United States. The mission served a territory of 17,500 square miles (45,000 km^{2}) with 60,000 inhabitants who lived by hunting, fishing and growing vegetables in gardens. There were five adult missionaries, one of whom was a doctor, and five children. They lived in a row of four brick houses with tin roofs. The mission ran a residential school for 450 male and 100 female students from 6 to 30 years of age, giving a four-year course partly in the Mongo language and partly in French. A print of the Head of Christ by Warner Sallman arrived at the Monieka mission in 1947, where it was used in religious pageants.

== Sources ==
- Boelaert, E.; Vinck, H.; Lonkama, Ch. (1996), "Arrivée des blancs sur les bords des riviéres equatoriales (Partie II et fin)", Annales Aequatoria (in French), 17, Honoré Vinck: 7–416, JSTOR 25837249
- Burke, Donald (2 Jun 1947), "Congo Mission", Life Magazine
- Hunt, Nancy Rose (2015), A Nervous State: Violence, Remedies, and Reverie in Colonial Congo, Duke University Press, ISBN 978-0-8223-7524-1
- Lundbom, Jack R. (2015), Master Painter: Warner E. Sallman, Wipf and Stock Publishers, ISBN 978-1-72523-550-2
- "Map: Société anonyme belge pour le commerce du Haut-Congo : emplacement des 83 factoreries et postes au 1er janvier 1894", Mouvement géographique, Brussels: Institut national de géographie, 28 October 1894
- "Monieka", Geonames
- Province de la Tshuapa Territoire de Boende (PDF), World Food Programme, 17 March 2020
- "Relation: Monieka (10734662)", OpenStreetMap
