= Busira (Democratic Republic of the Congo) =

- Village
- Location in the Democratic Republic of the Congo
- Coordinates: 0.2096°S 20.0527°E
- Country: Democratic Republic of the Congo
- Province: Province of Équateur
- Territory: Bolomba Territory
- Sector: Busira

Busira, or Busira Manene, is a village in the Province of Équateur in the Democratic Republic of the Congo, in Busira Territory.

== Location ==
Busira is on the north shore of the Busira River at an elevation of about 334 metres (1,096 ft). It is in the Busira collectivity of the Bolomba Territory. A colonial map from 1894 shows the Bussira Manene trading post in this location, upstream from the Lengué (Salonga) River and downstream from Bocoté (Bokote).

== Colonial era ==
As of 1 January 1894 the Société anonyme belge pour le commerce du Haut-Congo (SAB) had 83 factories and posts, including some in the French territory to the west of the Congo and Ubangi rivers. A map shows the company had posts along the upper Ruki River (i.e. the Busira) at Bilakamba, Bombimba, Bussira Manene, Moniaca, Bocoté and Yolongo. The Protestants established a mission at Monieka in 1912. The American doctor Louis Jaggard (1877–1951) at the mission spoke in 1917 with scorn of the 30 or so traders at Bussira, 4 miles (6.4 km) away, who came to him for treatment. He called them "low down white trash".

== Isidore Bakanja ==
Isidore Bakanja was born in Ikengo around 1885, and found work laying bricks in what is now Mbandaka, where he was baptised as a Catholic on 6 May 1906. He moved to Busira, where his cousin was an employee of the Belgian Société anonyme belge pour le commerce du Haut-Congo (SAB), and became a servant of a SAB director named Ruijders. Ruijders took him to Itiki in the Buch-Bloc region in 1909, where the local SAB manager Van Canter felt strongly that Catholicism would destroy the authority of Europeans over "natives". When Isidore refused to give up his practices, Von Canter had him beaten and then chained in solitary confinement. Ruijders heard of this and took him back to Busira, where he died on 15 August 1909 due to his mistreatment. He was beatified on 24 April 1994.

== Sources ==
- Boelaert, E.; Vinck, H.; Lonkama, Ch. (1996), "Arrivée des blancs sur les bords des riviéres equatoriales (Partie II et fin)", Annales Aequatoria (in French), 17, Honoré Vinck: 7–416, JSTOR 25837249
- "Busira", Geonames
- Butler, Alban; Burns, Paul (1998-01-01), "Bd Ididore Bakanja", Butler's Lives of the Saints: August, A&C Black, ISBN 978-0-86012-257-9
- Hunt, Nancy Rose (2015-12-30), A Nervous State: Violence, Remedies, and Reverie in Colonial Congo, Duke University Press, ISBN 978-0-8223-7524-1
- "Map: Société anonyme belge pour le commerce du Haut-Congo : emplacement des 83 factoreries et postes au 1er janvier 1894", Mouvement géographique, Brussels: Institut national de géographie, 28 October 1894
- "Territoire d'Ingende" (PDF), Reliefweb (map) (in French), 3 March 2020
