= Busira =

Busira may refer to:

- Busira River, a river in the Democratic Republic of the Congo
- Busira (Democratic Republic of the Congo), a village on the Busira River
