= Ingende =

- Commune
- Location in the Democratic Republic of the Congo
- Coordinates: 0.310332°S 18.969292°E
- Country: DR Congo
- Province: Équateur
- Territory: Ingende

Ingende is a town in the Province of Équateur in the Democratic Republic of the Congo, the headquarters of Ingende Territory.

== Location ==
Ingende is on the south shore of the Ruki River just downstream of the confluence of the Momboyo River and the Busira River. The nearby Ingende Airport (FZEI) has a 1,150 metres (3,770 ft) runway. The N8 highway passes through the town, crossing the Ruki River by ferry. The Ingende Territory stretches to the south and east of Ingende, bounded by the Busira River to the north and the Salonga River to the northeast. The Luilaka River (called the Momboyo River in its lower section) flows through the center of the territory.

== Sources ==
- "Ruki River", Encyclopaedia Britannica
- Swartz, Karl L., "FZEI - Airport", Great Circle Mapper
- "Territoire d'Ingende" (PDF), Reliefweb (map) (in French), 3 March 2020
