= Bomputu =

- Village
- Location within Democratic Republic of the Congo
- Coordinates: 0.466980°S 20.141985°E
- Country: Democratic Republic of the Congo
- Province: Tshuapa
- Elevation: 331 m (1,086 ft)

Bomputu is a community on the Salonga River in the province of Tshuapa in the Democratic Republic of the Congo. In the colonial period it held a trading post.

== Location ==
Bomputu is on the east shore of the Salonga River in the province of Tshuapa. It is in the extreme west of Boende Territory. The village is at an elevation of about 331 metres (1,086 ft).

== Colonial era ==
The villages of Bomputu, Boende, Baliko and Iyonje all belonged to one Bolangala clan. Ekof'Olomba was in charge of Bomputu. A local account says how Ekof'Olomba took a shield and spears and went to make a pact of friendship with the Whites. Lemesu, leader of the Whites, told him to get his people out of the forest, where they were hiding. The White then imposed the harvest of rubber on all four villages, and told Ekof'Olomba to bring him supplies each day.

As of 1 January 1894 the Société anonyme belge pour le commerce du Haut-Congo (SAB) had 83 factories and posts, including some in the French territory to the west of the Congo and Ubangi rivers. A map shows the company had posts along the upper Ruki River (i.e. the Busira) at Bilakamba, Bombimba, Bussira Manene, Moniaca, Bocoté and Yolongo. It also had the post at Bomputu on the Lengué (Salonga) River, and posts at Balalondzy, Ivulu and Ivuku on the Momboyo River.

In the late 1920a and early 1930s the local people in Equateur district were passively resisting the colonial occupation. The authorities found the people of the villages of Bolemba, Bombongo, Bomputu, Liemba, Biala and Yundji were aggressively hostile, and implemented a military action in the area.

== Sources ==
- "Bomputu", Geonames
- "Node: Bomputu (1736044949)", OpenStreetMap
- "Map: Société anonyme belge pour le commerce du Haut-Congo : emplacement des 83 factoreries et postes au 1er janvier 1894", Mouvement géographique, Brussels: Institut national de géographie, 28 October 1894
- Province de la Tshuapa Territoire de Boende (PDF), World Food Programme, 17 March 2020
- Veerle Nollet (2003), "Conflict and Subversion in the Central Congo between 1920 and 1940", Annales Aequatoria, 24, Honoré Vinck: 77–96, JSTOR 25836808
- Vinck, Honoré (1991), "Boende", Annales Aequatoria (in French), 12, Honoré Vinck: 534–553, JSTOR 25836996
