= Bolomba =

- Commune
- Location in Democratic Republic of the Congo
- Coordinates: 0°21′13″S 19°13′41″E
- Country: DR Congo
- Province: Équateur
- Territory: Bolomba

Bolomba is a city in the Democratic Republic of the Congo. It is the capital of the Bolomba Territory.

== See also ==
- List of cities in the Democratic Republic of the Congo
