= Ikengo =

- Location within Democratic Republic of the Congo
- Coordinates: 0.1269°S 18.1338°E
- Country: Democratic Republic of the Congo
- Province: Équateur
- Elevation: 302 m (991 ft)
- Time zone: UTC+1 (Africa/Kinshasa)

Ikengo is a village in Équateur Province, Democratic Republic of the Congo, on the left bank of the Congo River.

== Location ==
Ikengo is in Équateur Province, on the left bank of the Congo River about 20 kilometres (12 mi) southwest of Mbandaka.

On 8 June 1883 the explorer Henry Morton Stanley passed by the Ikengo villages, Ikengo, Itumbu and Inganda. He had been there before in 1877, and the people of each village asked him to come to their village and promised food, beer and wine.

== Health ==
One of the main health problems in Ikengo is the lack of clean water, leading to illnesses such as diarrhea. Malaria and acute respiratory infections are also common. In 2021 the United Nations Development Programme (UNDP) handed over a health center in Ikengo to the local authorities. It was receiving about 20 patients per day. Due to its accessibility by canoe it served several nearby health zones.

== Notable people ==
- Isidore Bakanja was born in Ikengo around 1885. He was beatified on 24 April 1994.

== Sources ==
- Butler, Alban; Burns, Paul (1998-01-01), "Bd Ididore Bakanja", Butler's Lives of the Saints: August, A&C Black, ISBN 978-0-86012-257-9
- Marc Ngwanza (2021), Les villages d'Ikengo et de Ngombe dotés des centres de santé modernes, UNDP
- "Node: Ikengo (1154879276)", OpenStreetMap
- Stanley, Henry Morton (1885), The Congo and the Founding of Its Free State: A Story of Work and Exploration. With Over One Hundred Full-page and Smaller Illustrations, Two Large Maps, and Several Smaller Ones, vol. 2, Sampson Low
