= Maria N'koi =

Congolese rebel and healer

Maria N’koi is a Congolese rebel and healer known for having launched a "therapeutic insurgency" against the colonial administration of the Belgian Congo in 1915, opposing taxation and forced labor.

After the scramble for Africa, Congo became a personal possession of the Belgian king, Léopold II, who brutally exploited it with violently enforced rubber production quotas.

In 1903 Léopold asked the Liverpool School to study sleeping sickness in the Congo. These scientists mistakenly believed that the disease was infectious, and instituted internment camps and medical passports. Horrible conditions in the camps exacerbated a fundamental dissonance in the imposed public health measures; local healers believed in protecting the patient from harm rather than protecting the community from the patient. In fact the disease spreading due to the forced-labor harvesting of rubber from Landolphia vines in areas infested with the primary vectors of the illness, tsetse flies.

Many others revolted in this period, but hers led to later revolts in Bus-Bloc and Dekese, and foreshadowed the advent of Simon Kimbangu. In all, thirty armed government interventions took place in 1915, some of them military, according to an annual report from the colonial administration to Brussels. Colonial administrators commonly arbitrarily assigned villages to collect rubber in territories belonging to other peoples, leading to conflict, and also raided villages that failed to meet their quotas. Villagers fled from these demands, and often were helped to do so.

However, Maria N'koi was drawing crowds in 1915, and Équateur, where she lived, adjoined the German territory of Kamerun following a French defeat by the Germans in 1911 and she was forecasting the defeat of the Belgians by the Germans in addition to advocating defiance. In fact the Kamerun campaign led to a German loss and partition of their territories between the French and British. Maria N'koi was arrested and tried at Coquilhatville, then exiled (réléguée) to Buta. In 1929 authorities allowed her to leave Buta, but still thought her too dangerous to allow her to return home, and required her to go instead to Coquilhatville, where some of the Africans were évolués.

Maria N'Koi (of the leopard) was named for a leopard she was said to have killed in her youth, and is also still associated in local tales of her arrest with trees, magic and healing. In her later years the Mobutu government recognized her as an official guerriseur and asked her to work for the revolution. The records of the colonial prison system paint yet a third, sexualized, image of her.

== See also ==
- King Leopold's Ghost
- Atrocities in the Congo Free State
- Simon Kimbangu
- Buta Territory
- Congo Reform Association
- The Scramble for Africa
- Entente cordiale
