= Bokote =

- Village
- Location within Democratic Republic of the Congo
- Coordinates: 0.213726°S 20.207095°E
- Country: Democratic Republic of the Congo
- Province: Équateur
- Territory: Bolomba Territory
- Elevation: 335 m (1,099 ft)

Bokote is a community on the Busira River in the Province of Équateur in the Democratic Republic of the Congo. In the colonial period it held a trading post and a Catholic mission.

== Location ==
Bokote is on the north shore of the Busira River in the Province of Équateur. The river here forms the boundary with the province of Tshuapa, which Bokote faces to the south. (Note: Maps of this area tend to be inaccurate. A map prepared for the World Food Programme in 2020 shows Bokote a few kilometers north of the river. Google maps as of March 2021 showed the village even further from the river in what appears to be uninhabited forest. However, Geonames and WorldStreetMap agree on a location on the river, where a satellite view shows a substantial community. This is consistent with the colonial maps and descriptions of the village.) It is at an elevation of about 335 metres (1,099 ft).

== Precolonial times ==
The early European explorers found that the Busira-Tshuapa region was inhabited by different groups of Mongo people, including the Bokote, Ekota, Bakutu, Bosaka, Bongando and Boyela. The trading posts and missions were often given the same name as the local people, examples being Bokote, Bamanya, Bokuma and Lotumbe. As was common in the area, the fishing village of Bokote was paired with the farming village of Liyolongo, and the two villages traded their produce. The people came together for dances, games and festivals, and intermarried.

== Colonial era ==
As of 1 January 1894 the Société anonyme belge pour le commerce du Haut-Congo (SAB) had 83 factories and posts, including some in the French territory to the west of the Congo and Ubangi rivers. A map shows the company had posts along the upper Ruki River (i.e. the Busira) at Bilakamba, Bombimba, Bussira Manene, Moniaca, Bocoté and Yolongo. It also had a post at Bomputu on the Lengué (Salonga) River, and posts at Balalondzy, Ivulu and Ivuku on the Momboyo River.

The first Catholic mission station in the region was established in 1913 in Bokote, followed by a station in Boende in 1925. In 1924 the Missionaries of the Sacred Heart took Bokote back from the Trappists. A 1920s or 1930s postcard from the Sacred Heart mission agency in Coquilhatville (now Mbandaka]) shows a line of eight young girls wearing traditional clothing with the caption "La jeunesse de Bokote." ("Youth of Bokote"). Another postcard from that period shows a number of people standing in dugout boats in the river, some holding paddles, with the legend "4. – Mission de Coquilhatville, Congo Belge. –Sur la Busira, a Bokote." ("On the Busira, Bokote").

== Sources ==
- Boelaert, E.; Vinck, H.; Lonkama, Ch. (1996), "Arrivée des blancs sur les bords des riviéres equatoriales (Partie II et fin)", Annales Aequatoria (in French), 17, Honoré Vinck: 7–416, JSTOR 25837249
- "Bokote DR Congo, Équateur", Geonames
- "Dugout boats in the Busira River, Bokote, Congo, ca. 1920–1940", USC Digital Library
- "Group of young girls, Bokote, Congo, ca. 1920–1940", Calisphere, University of California
- Hulstaert, Gustaaf (1992), "Onomastique Mongo", Annales Aequatoria (in French), 13, Honoré Vinck: 161–275
- "Map: Société anonyme belge pour le commerce du Haut-Congo : emplacement des 83 factoreries et postes au 1er janvier 1894", Mouvement géographique, Brussels: Institut national de géographie, 28 October 1894
- "Node: Bokote (1721825132)", OpenStreetMap
- "Territoire d'Ingende" (PDF), Reliefweb (map) (in French), 3 March 2020
- Vinck, Honoré (1991), "Boende", Annales Aequatoria (in French), 12, Honoré Vinck: 534–553, JSTOR 25836996
