= Ciments du Katanga =

Cement company in the Democratic Republic of the Congo

Coordinates: 9.942877°S 25.960530°E

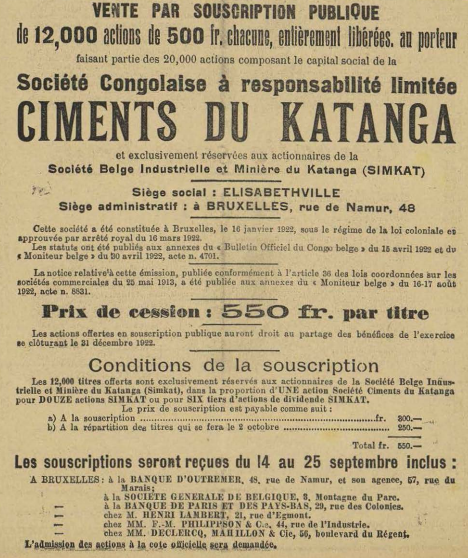
- Trade name: CMKT or Cimenkat
- Type: Limited liability
- Industry: Cement
- Founded: January 16, 1922; 104 years ago in Lubudi, Belgian Congo
- Headquarters: Democratic Republic of the Congo
- Products: Cement-related

Ciments du Katanga (CMKT or Cimenkat) is a company in the Democratic Republic of the Congo that makes cement and related products. It was established during the copper boom of the early 1920s to supply the new mining and refining companies, including worker housing and industrial construction.

== Creation ==
Katanga is in the heart of the continent and has no navigable water route to the ocean. The ores from the rich copper mines of the region had to be refined to reduce their bulk, and thus cut transport costs. Cimenkat was one of a number of construction-related companies founded to support housing for the growing workforce and other types of construction for the mining companies. The Société Ciments du Katanga was created by royal decree on 16 January 1922 to supply cement to the rapidly growing Union Minière du Haut-Katanga (UMHK) and other companies in southern Katanga and the two Kasais. The founders included the Société Belge et Minière du Katanga, the Compagnie du Congo pour le commerce et l'industrie, the Banque de Paris et des Pays-Bas, the Belgo-Katanga and others.

== Belgian Congo ==
Directors in the early years included Alphonse van Gèle and Louis Valcke.

The cement factory in Lubudi, Katanga was commissioned at the start of 1924. By the end of 1958 its production capacity was 200,000 tonnes, including 180,000 tonnes of cement and 20,000 tonnes of clinker, which were sold to Ciments Métallurgiques de Jadotville. The plant at first supplied UMHK and other Katangan companies, but its market also extended to neighboring countries. A fibrocement factory was established in 1929 to manufacture materials such as granites, artificial stones, tiles, pipes and corrugated roofing sheets. A second cement plant was founded in Likasi in 1953. Its cement was particularly suitable for foundation work, since it was resistant to groundwater loaded with sulphate.

== Democratic Republic of the Congo ==
Under the law of 17 June 1960 the company came under Belgian law. On 13 February 1962 Ciments du Katanga transferred its property and facilities at Lubudi, and all its industrial and commercial activities, to a new company incorporated under Congolese law, Ciments et materiaux de construction du Katanga (CIMENKAT). The company was nationalized on 31 December 1974, and became completely state-owned. On 17 September 1976 it was restored to its former shareholders. As of 1995 these were GECAMINES (49.8%), EGINTER (47.4%), S.A. des Cimenteries CBR (2.1%) and ETEROUTREMER (0.7%).

== Sources ==
- Coosemans, Marthe (20 January 1953), "VALCKE (Louis Pierre Alphonse)", Biographie Coloniale Belge, vol. V, Inst. roy. colon. belge
- Engels, A. (1951), "Vangele (Alphonse)" (PDF), Biographie Coloniale Belge, vol. 2, Institut royal colonial belge, pp. 928–37
- Frankema, Ewout; Buelens, Frans (12 March 2013), Colonial Exploitation and Economic Development: The Belgian Congo and the Netherlands Indies Compared, Routledge, ISBN 978-1-136-75947-5
- Van Bost, Pierre (June 2019), "L'industrialisation Du Congo" (PDF), Mémoires du Congo et du Ruanda-Urundi (in French) (50)
- Pary, J., Les matériaux de construction, l'industrie Katangaise. Réalisation et prospective, 1955-1960.
