= Louis Valcke =

Belgian soldier, explorer, and colonial administrator (1857–1940)

Louis Pierre Alphonse Valcke
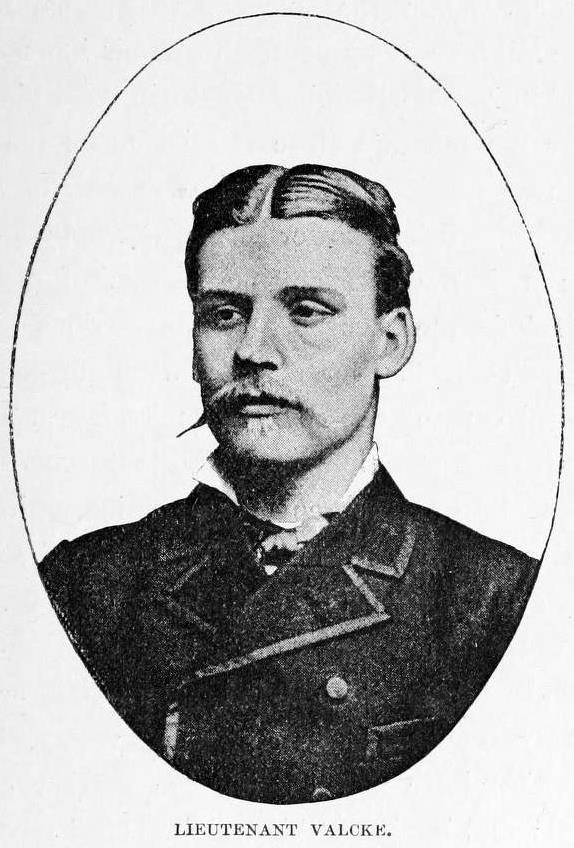
- Valcke from Stanley's 1885 The Congo and the founding of its free state
- Born: 22 December 1857; Bruges, Belgium
- Died: 16 March 1940 (aged 82); Ghent, Belgian
- Occupations: soldier, explorer, colonial administrator

Louis Pierre Alphonse Valcke (22 December 1857 – 16 March 1940) was a Belgian soldier, explorer, and colonial administrator.

== Early years (1857–1880) ==
Louis Pierre Alphonse Valcke was born in Bruges on 22 December 1857. His parents were Liévin-Pierre Valcke and Clémence d'Ongena. He studied at the Bruges Atheneum, then entered the Military School on 1 December 1874. He was promoted to lieutenant on 1 January 1877. On 27 February 1878 he was assigned to the engineers regiment in Antwerp.

In 1880 Valcke was seconded by the Military Cartographic Institute (Note: Military Cartographic Institute (French: Institut cartographique militaire) was used as a method of assigned Belgian army officers to the service of the king in establishing what would become the Congo Free State.) and assigned to the Upper Congo Studies Committee. He was charged by the king to study how best to reach the center of Africa, and advised the king to abandon the idea of entering via the Indian Ocean. At the end of July 1880 the king authorized Valcke to enter the Congo Basin via the Atlantic. He asked Valcke to maintain complete secrecy about the proposed enterprise, and to be patient and flexible with Henry Morton Stanley, whom he described as being a brilliant explorer and energetic organizer, but with a difficult and ambititious character.

== First tour in the Congo (1880–1881) ==
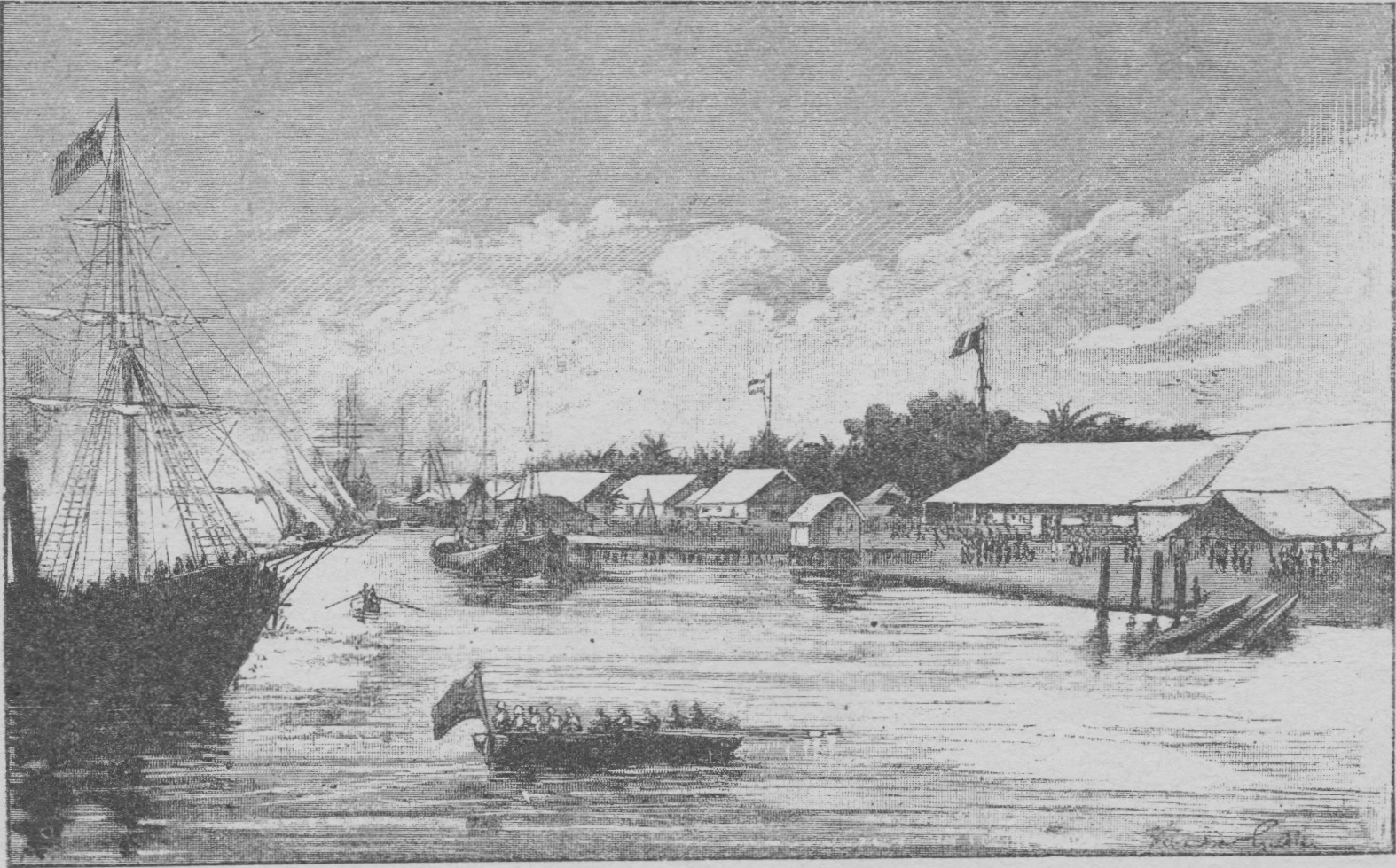
Banana in 1887

On 4 August 1880 Valcke embarked at Ostend to travel via Liverpool to Banana, which he reached on 2 October 1880, and on 6 October 1880 went up the river to Vivi to contact Stanley. On 15 November 1880 Stanley sent Valcke orders to join him at Ngoma, which Valcke reached on 25 November 1880. Stanley explained that his task was to build a road that would pass the foot of the Ngoma plateau and make it possible to transport equipment, provisions and personnel to establish stations in the Congo territory. Valcke used explosives to blast rocks from the mountain, which combined with tree trunks were used to build the 1,500 metres (4,900 ft) "Valcke's causeway" from Ngoma to N'Konzo. Stanley wrote of Valcke's work, "Though our young friend is frequently suffering from dysentery, by the time he is through with his task, we have finished off our causeway, have levelled it with 24 inches of earth, and a fine compact broad wagon road is the result, along the base of which the baffled river lashes itself into fury.

On 8 December they camped at a place named Khonzo. Stanley steamed the Royal upstream and was able to get within 1.5 miles (2.4 km) of Isangila. From Khonzo 100 men went overland making the road, while the steamers carried materials up by water. By 30 December the expedition had made camp .75 miles (1.21 km) from Isangila, and the steamers were in a cove from which a road could be made to haul them up to their launching place above the rapids. Stanley left Valcke in charge while he returned to Vivi to haul the new wagons and new steel lighter that had been left at the Bundi. The boats were on shore in the camp on 2 January 1881 to be repaired, scraped and painted in readiness for the journey to Manyanga.

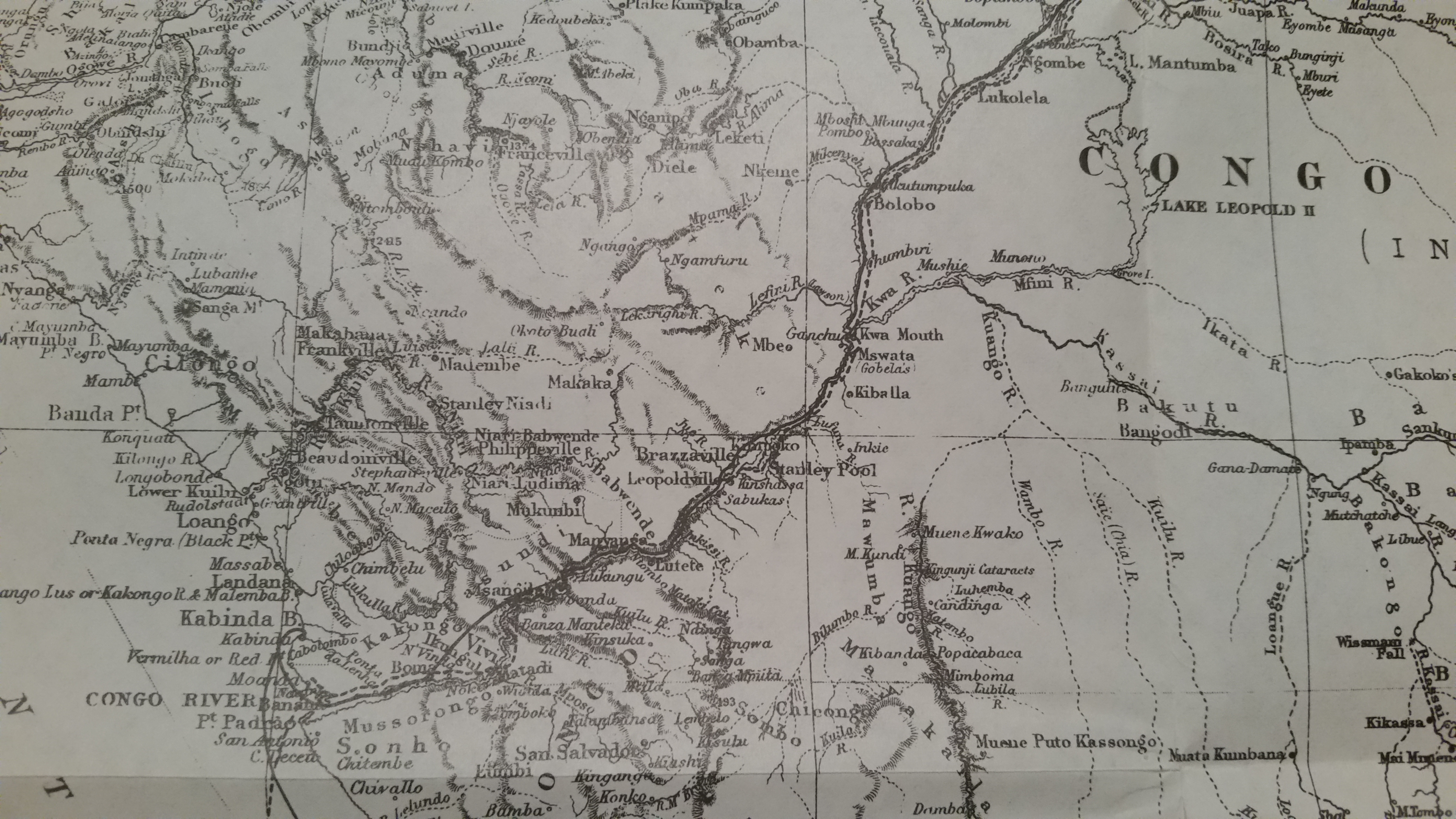
Map of the Congo from Stanley's Through the Dark Continent

In February 1881 Stanley heard rumours that English missionaries were planning to build a post in the region, and asked Valcke to establish an International African Association (AIA) post at Isanghila before they did so. The post was complete within two months. While Valcke continued to develop the Isanghila post, Stanley took the steamers En Avant and Royal up the navigable stretch of the river to Manyanga, where Stanley started to build a post, which he entrusted to Victor Harou. He charged Charles-Marie de Braconnier with building a road from Manianga to the mouth of the Lufu River, bypassing the Ntombo-Mataka falls. Valcke entrusted Isanghila to Eugène Janssens and Frédéric Orban, and joined Stanley in Manianga on 14 July 1881. They left the next day with a contingent of native auxiliaries along the route marked out by Braconnier carrying the En Avant and two whalers they intended to launch at the Stanley Pool.

They reached the Djoué River without difficulty. There they were informed that Pierre Savorgnan de Brazza had signed a treaty with Chief Makoka and claimed possession for France of the whole right shore of the Congo River north of the Pool. The Belgians established a camp on the right bank of the Djoué, and on 3 August 1881 Stanley asked Valcke to return to the coast and try to catch the boat due on 20 August 1881 from Banana to St-Paul de Loanda, He should bring back trade goods to win the chief Ngaliéma over to the AIA. Valcke made the 500 kilometres (310 mi) journey to Banana in seven days. He was suffering from fever and hematuria when he reached Luanda, but managed to acquire the goods and take then to Banana, where he dispatched them to Stanley and then returned to Belgium, reaching Ostend on 23 December 1881.

== Second tour in the Congo (1882–1885) ==
=== Road to Léopoldville ===
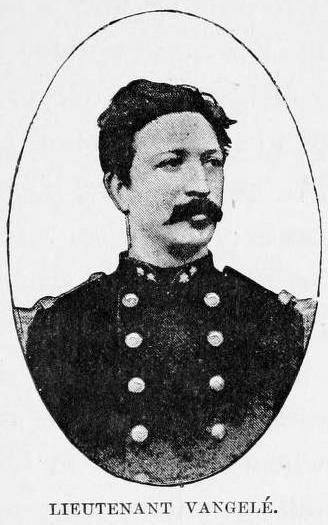
Alphonse van Gèle

In Brussels Valcke met King Léopold II, who agreed that it was necessary to move fast to occupy Central Africa. On 8 February 1882 Valcke left for Zanzibar to recruit auxiliaries and bring them to Banana via Cape Town, where he was joined by Alphonse van Gèle. In the meantime, Stanley had undertaken a tiring expedition to the Mfini and Lake Léopold II, where he came down with fever and abdominal pain and was ordered to return to Europe. He was in Vivi when Valcke and Van Gèle arrived in April. Stanley gave Valcke exclusive command of the 256 Zanzibaris, independent of the new administrator Eduard Pechuël-Loesche. Valcke left Lieven van de Velde in Vivi with the sick from the Zanzibari contingent and set out with Van Gèle carrying a new boiler for the Royal and 600 loads of goods. At the Loa height Van Gèle fell ill and had to return to Vivi, while Valcke continued on.

He was joined by Van de Velde and the recovered Zanzibaris on 1 August. The road to Isanghila needed repair to meet the transport requirements. Valcke and his column reached Isanghila on 30 August and continued to Manyanga. Here Valcke intervened to pacify the Mowa region at the request of the station commander, Théodore Nilis. Valcke then began to build a road along the left bank for use in carrying the A.I.A. and goods to be stored at the Pool. The road was built without difficulty through the territory of the chiefs Lutete and Makito, who had to be convinced to allow passage of the Europeans. A state post was established at Lutete and entrusted to Van Gele. Early in October the propeller steamboat A.I.A. built by Chantiers et Forges de la Méditerranée arrived in Banana. Frédéric Orban and Charles Callewaert brought it in parts to Isanghila, then assembled it and brought it to Manyanga in October 1882. Orban fell ill and Valcke took over the job of carrying the steamer to the Pool, where it would be reassembled ready for Stanley's next expedition in May 1883.

=== Treaties ===
Valcke had to meet Makoko of Mbe to get him to cancel or at least loosen the treaty he had made with the French. He and Camille Coquilhat reached Léopoldville on 7 December and Msuata on 13 December with an escort of 50 Zanzibaris and the goods needed for the negotiations. Valcke found that after Brazza had left, Chief Makoko had taken most of the French goods for himself, which had led to him being deposed. The chiefs Mfumu Ntaba, Ngaliema and Gantschu accepted the authority of the AIA and consented to European posts being built in the interior and on the river between the mouths of the Lefini and the Djoué. On 13 January 1883 Valcke was at Mfoa where he heard from Braconnier that the French Chamber had ratified the treaty with Makoko. He was to abandon all activity on the right shore of the Congo and return to Manyanga to join Stanley, who had returned to Vivi on 20 December 1882. Valcke reached Léopoldville on 14 January 1883 and Manyanga on 16 January 1883 where he met Stanley and Edmond Hanssens, who would leave for the Niadi-Kwilu on 23 February 1883.

=== Transport and supply ===
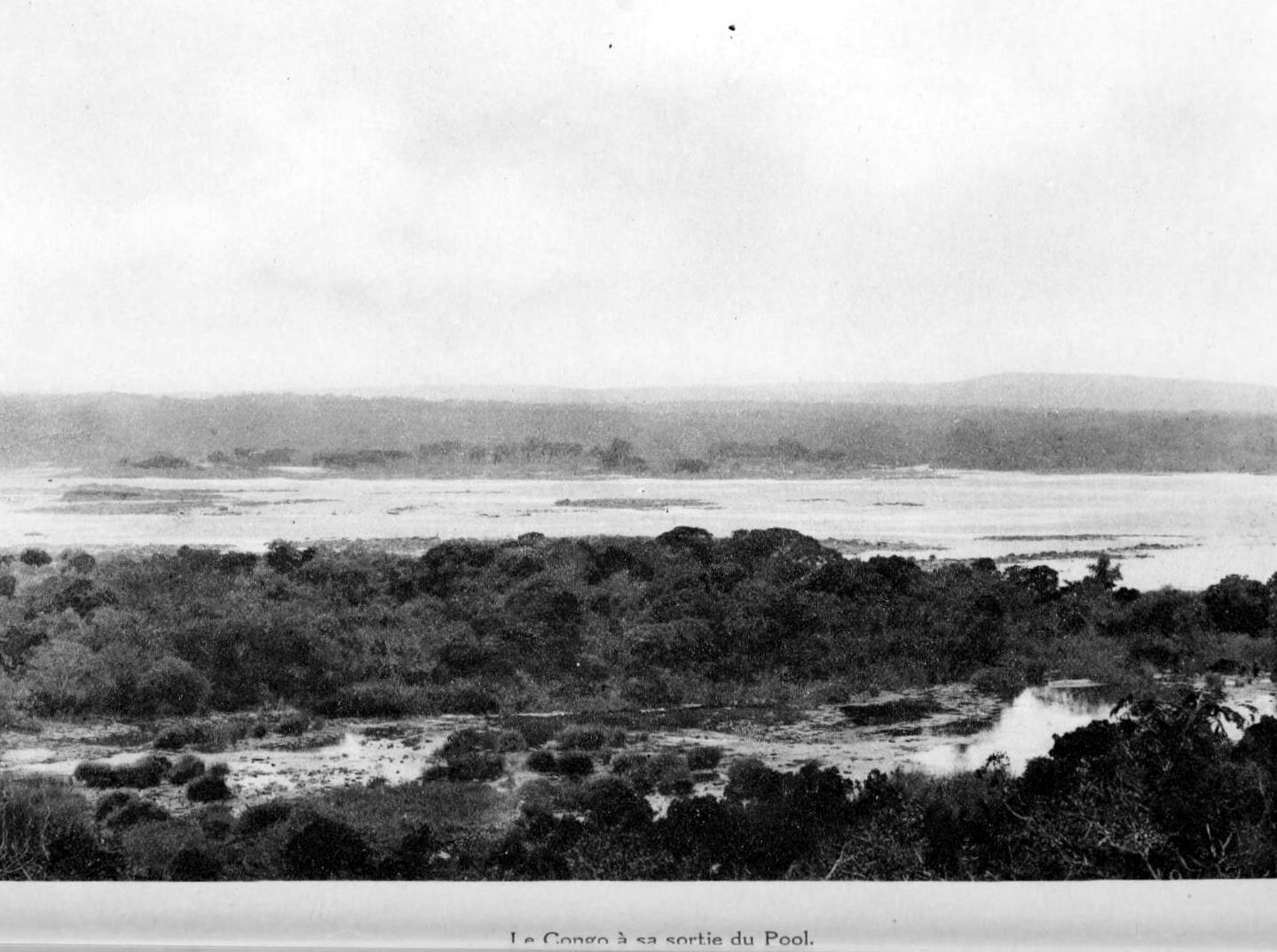
The Congo leaving the Pool circa 1888

Stanley had decided to replace the Royal by whaling boats on the Isanghila-Manyanga reach, and transport the steamer to Léopoldville. Stanley took charge of taking the steamer on the right bank to the Inkisi between 7 and 27 February, where he had to cross the river and continue on the left bank. Valcke had to transport the two A.I.A. boilers on the left bank. He used two stretchers, each carried by eight porters. The caravan reached Léopoldville on 27 February 1883. He continued with transport and supply work until 3 April, when he became exhausted and asked to be relieved. Van Gèle took over the work, while Valcke returned to Léopoldville. Stanley gave him command of the Stanley Pool district and Léopoldville station, and general responsibility for the Cataractes and Bas-Congo region.

Léopoldville was developing fast when word came of troubles at Manyanga and Stanley sent Valcke there with an escort of 45 Zanzibaris to restore order. After his return, Valcke was entrusted with obtaining agreement from the chiefs of all the territories between the coast and the Pool to form a confederation and to place themselves under the protection of the AIA, recognizing AIA sovereignty. Valcke was joined at Vivi by the English General Sir Frederic John Goldsmid, who had been sent by the king to conclude the same treaty, and who confessed himself unqualified for the task. They divided up the work until Sir Frederic fell ill at Isanghila and Valcke had to complete the work.

=== Transport of the Stanley ===
In Léopoldville on 20 January 1884 Stanley charged Valcke with bringing the steamer Stanley from Banana to the Pool for use on the upper Congo. It arrived in parts on 9 January 1884. The Stanley was a huge sternwheeler 24 metres (79 ft) long, 6 metres (20 ft) wide and weighing 35 tons. Assembly began in Banana and was continued in Boma. On 20 April 1884 the Stanley left Boma fully loaded and reached Vivi on 31 April 1884, where dismantling began so it could be taken on by land. Valcke started to organize a caravan of 250 Zanzibaris to carry the equipment and 15,000 loads of food and goods weighing 65 pounds (29 kg) each. He fell sick with hematuria and was ordered to recover at the Boma sanitorium, where he remained until 16 May 1884. When he returned to Vivi he found that many of his men were being employed on widening the Vivi-Isanghila road by order of Stanley.

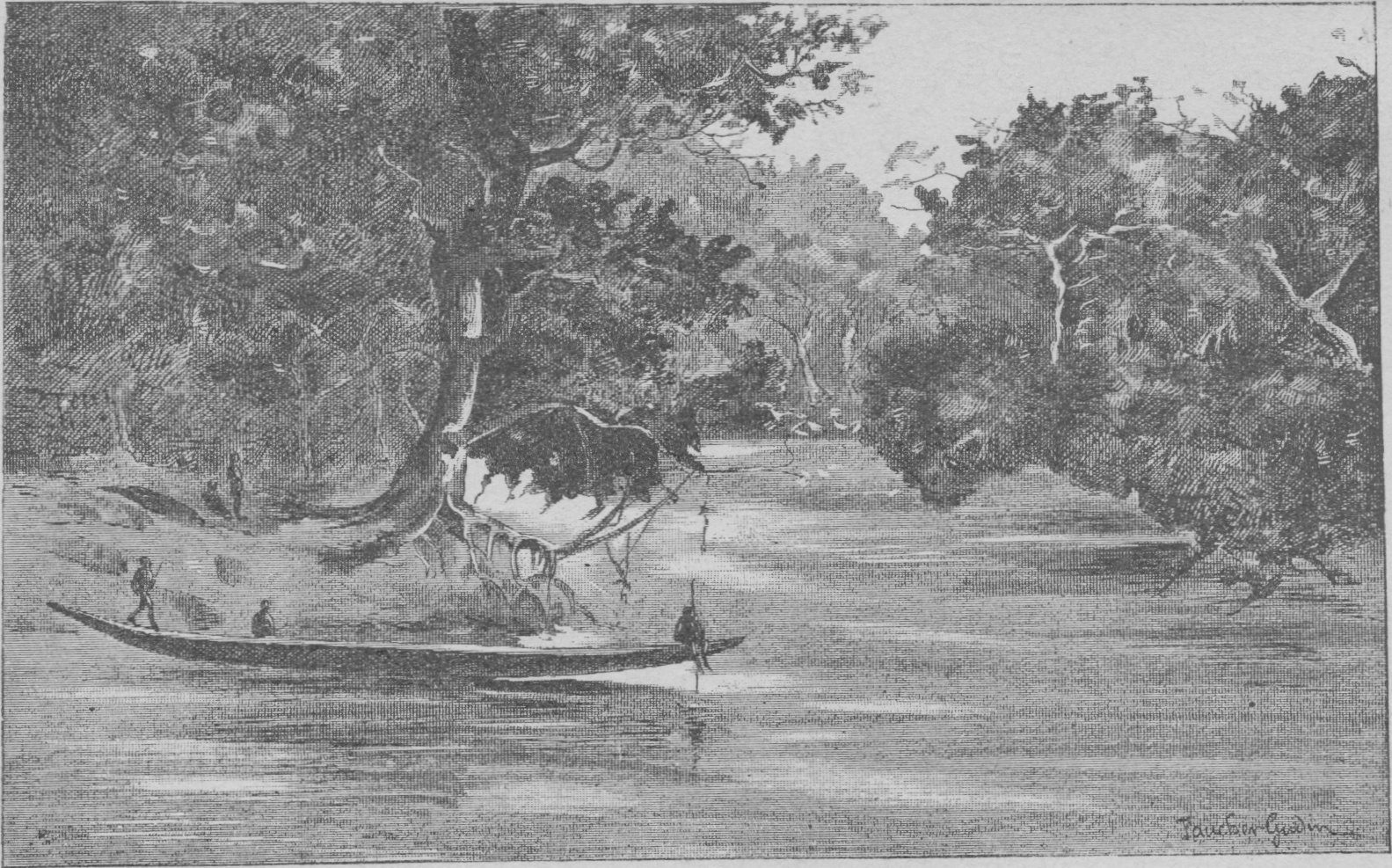
Crossing over the Inkisi River. From Stanleys expedition till Emin Paschas undsättning (1890)

Sir Francis de Winton mediated with Stanley, who gave back the Zanzibaris to Valcke, and with many difficulties the caravan reached Isanghila on 4 September 1884. It left by water on 14 September, reached Tshumbu by water and on 3 December set off on the Tshumbu-Lukungu road, reaching Lukungu on 23 December 1884. Valcke suffered from another bout of hematuria, but pressed on and the seven boat sections and the boilers reached Lutete on 14 February 1885. On 10 March 1885 the exhausted caravan camped at the Inkisi River. The local people all deserted overnight. The Zanzibaris bridged the river and carried all he equipment across on the evening of 13 March, but some of them deserted that night leaving only 82 men with Valcke. Valcke left a guard at the Inkisi under Wall and Olsen and set off for Vivi, again suffering from hematuria. He went on to Boma and took ship to Rotterdam, which he reached in mid-April, where he was bedridden for six weeks. He returned to Belgium on 19 May 1885. In his absence, the Stanley completed its journey and was launched on the pool in December 1885.

== Third and fourth tours in the Congo ==
In 1885 Valcke married the 18-year-old Augusta Eerebout (5 December 1866 – 12 August 1940). She accompanied him in June 1886 when he returned to the Congo after being appointed director of the navy and transport of the Congo Free State. She was the first Belgian wife of a State agent authorized to stay in Central Africa during the term of her spouse. She was accompanied by a young Flemish servant and settled in a comfortable house by the standards of the time in the capital of the state, Boma. There she entertained senior officials of the Free State.

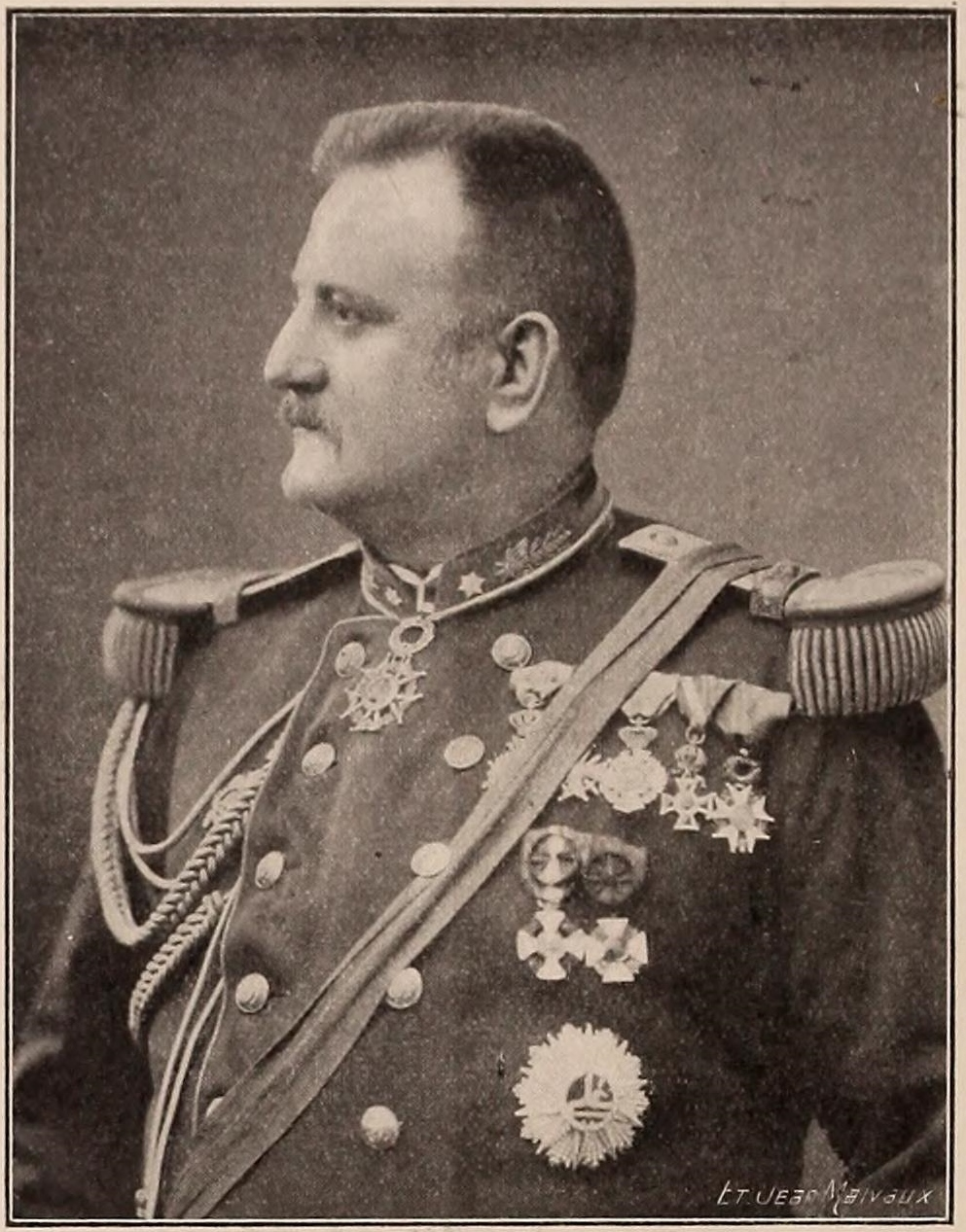
Albert Thys from Le chemin de fer du Congo (Matadi-Stanley-Pool) (1907)

In the absence of Camille Janssen, at one time Valcke was interim governor-general at the age of 29. In 1887 he began construction at Matadi of a 6 metres (20 ft) landing stage connected to the shore by two 15 metres (49 ft) walls. On 2 June 1887 he was visited at his house in Boma by Albert Thys and members of the Compagnie du Congo pour le Commerce et l'Industrie (CCCI), and by engineers who were to study construction of the first railway in the Congo. On 8 August 1887 Valcke and Thys directed transport of five carts weighing 1,500–3,500 kilograms (3,300–7,700 lb) to Stanley Pool, which took hundreds of local laborers a month to achieve. The heavily loaded carts carried spare parts for the Roi des Belges and Ville de Bruxelles boats. His wife accompanied Valcke on this trip, as she had when he was building the pier in Matadi.

In 1888 Valcke and the engineer Fabry reported the general route of the railway based on a sketch map drawn up by Thuys. Valcke came down with hematuria again, followed by dysentery and an abscess of the liver, and in February 1888 returned to Europe. While in Belgium, Valcke and Thys created the Compagnie du chemin de fer du Congo, the Compagnie des Produits du Congo, and the Société anonyme belge du commerce du Haut-Congo (SAB). Valcke returned to the Congo in July 1889 on behalf of the SAB, where he replaced Major Parminter as director until March 1890. He established trading posts of this company as far as the Falls. He left the Congo for the last time for health reasons, and after a dispute with Jérôme Becker he retired from the army.

== Later career ==
In 1892 Valcke left for Colombia, where he managed several Franco-Belgian industrial enterprises, mainly gold mines. His wife, Augusta Eerebou, joined him there with their two children. Later the British government asked that he represent English interests in an arbitration between an English company and the Colombian government over a railway construction project. He remained in Colombia until 1910, when he finally returned to Belgium. He was involved in the Colonial Veterans Association and lectured on colonial subjects in Brussels, Ghent and Bruges. Valcke was involved in many colonial enterprises including the Union nationale des transports fluviaux (Unatra), Kilo-Moto Gold Mines, Société minière de Luebo, Société minière de l'Aruwimi-Ituri, Société minière du Kasai, Cie du Lomami-Lualaba, Ciments du Katanga and Cie du Kasai. He died in Ghent on 16 March 1940.

== Publications ==
- Louis Valcke (1886), "Des produits commerçables du Congo", Bull, de la Sté belge des Ingénieurs et industriels
- Louis Valcke (1886), "Cinq années sur le Congo", Bull, de la Sté de géographie commerciale de Paris, VIII (3): 203
- Louis Valcke (1886), "Description de la région des Cataractes, de Vivi au Stanley-Pool", Bull. Sté belge des ing. Et des industriels
- Louis Valcke (1885), "Conférence sur le Congo", Bull. Sté royale de géog. d'Anvers, X (1): 42
- Louis Valcke (1889), "Matadi, port de mer", Mouv. Géog.: 65
- Louis Valcke (1891), "D'Anvers au Congo", Mouv. Géog.: 73
- Louis Valcke, "Une Promenade autour d'un village du Bas-Congo", Conférence, Bull, de la Société belge de Géog, X: 60
- Louis Valcke (May 1930), "Pourquoi les vétérans coloniaux sont oubliés", Expansion Belge, and Vieux Congo by L, Lejeune: 23–31

== Sources ==
- Coosemans, Marthe (20 January 1953), "VALCKE (Louis Pierre Alphonse)", Biographie Coloniale Belge, vol. V, Inst. roy. colon. belge
- Cornet, Anne (26 August 2014), EEREBOUT (Augusta), Musée royal de l’Afrique centrale
- Inventaire des archives de Louis Valcke 1857 – 1940 (PDF), Tervuren: Koninklijk Museum voor Midden-Afrika, 2018
- Stanley, Henry Morton (25 August 2011), The Congo and the Founding of Its Free State: A Story of Work and Exploration, Cambridge University Press, ISBN 978-1-108-03131-8
