= Isidore Bakanja =

Roman Catholic martyr (1887–1909)

Blessed Isidore Bakanja
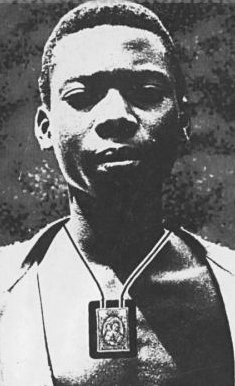

Martyr
- Born: c. 1880–1890; Bokendela, Congo Free State
- Died: 15 August 1909; Busira, Belgian Congo
- Venerated in: Roman Catholic Church
- Beatified: 24 April 1994, Saint Peter's Square by Pope John Paul II
- Feast: 15 August, 12 August (Carmelites)

Isidore Bakanja (c. 1880–1890 – 15 August 1909) was a Congolese Catechist who was killed by a plantation agent. He was beatified by Pope John Paul II in 1994.

== Life ==
Isidore Bakanja, a member of the Boangi tribe, was born in Bokendela, Congo Free State, between 1880 and 1890. to Iyonzwa and Inyuka. His birthplace was to the north of Mbandaka. There was no consistent pronunciation for Bakanja's name and the pronunciations of Bakanda, Bakana, Bokando, Makanda and Makando were used.

Bakanja went down to Mbandaka to seek employment. He was a bricklayer and farm worker. Trappists missionaries converted him to Christianity on 6 May 1906, at St. Eugene's parish, Bolokwa-Nsimba.

Bakanja was a Catechist. He worked at the rubber plantation in Ikili, but The owner of the plantation forbade Bakanja from proselyting to the other workers. Belgian agents opposed missionaries who fought for the rights of the natives. The superintendent tore off Bakanja's Brown Scapular and severely beat him on 22 April 1909. An agent gave Bakanja 100 blows using an elephant hide whip with nails on the end. He died from these wounds on 15 August. Van Cauter, the man who whipped Bakanja, was given a prison sentence of several years in 1910. Bakanja was buried in Bokote and construction of a shrine started in 2022.

== Veneration ==
A local apostolic vicar conducted a canonical inquiry into Bakanja and 24 witnesses were interrogated from 1913 to 1914. However, the Belgians opposed attempts to canonize Bakanja and agreed to improve the conditions of missionaries in exchange for discussion about Bakanja to end. The issue of Bakanja's beatification was raised by catechists in Zaire in 1976. Maria Valabek, a member of the Carmelites, was the postulator for Bakanja's beatification.

Pope John Paul II beatified Bakanja on 24 April 1994. His feast day is 15 August in the Roman Martyrology and 12 August in the calendar of the Carmelites. The death of Floribert Bwana Chui was compared to Bakanja's.

The National Shrine of Saint Jude, Faversham, United Kingdom contains an icon of Isidore. In 2004 a fire broke out in the Shrine Chapel which destroyed the murals which hung there, and it damaged much of the other artwork. The decision was made to install icons depicting saints inspired by the Rule of Saint Albert, and in commemoration of the 8th centenary of the Carmelite rule in 2007.

A parish in N'Djamena, Chad, was named in honour of Bakanja. Laity Coordination Committee of the Democratic Republic of Congo created the Bakanja-Kimbangu Grand Citizen Merit Award in 2020 to honour Congolese people who distinguish themselves with concrete and exceptional acts.

== Works cited ==
=== News ===
- "Goma: Relics of Blessed Floribert transferred to the Shrine of the Blessed Sacrament". Agenzia Fides. 10 July 2025.
- "We have much to learn from our persecuted brothers and sisters in Africa". Vatican News. 11 November 2025.
- Atemanke, Jude (23 February 2021). "Laity Council in DR Congo Recognizes Cardinal with "Bakanja-Kimbangu Grand Citizen Award"". ACI Africa.
- Lusimana, Blandine (14 March 2022). "Launch of construction work on the Isidore Bakanja shrine". Agence d'Information d'Afrique Centrale.
- Povoledo, Elisabetta (29 January 1995). "Word for Word: Martyrology; Brutalized in Colonial Africa, 1909; Beatified in Rome, 1994". The New York Times. Archived from the original on 29 June 2024.

=== Web ===
- "2021 Report on International Religious Freedom: Chad". United States Department of State.
- "Bakanja, Isidore". Dictionary of African Christian Biography.
- "Bl. Isidore Bakanja". General Secretariat for the Synod of Bishops.
- "Isidore Bakanja". Dicastery for the Causes of Saints.
