= Busira River =

River in Democratic Republic of the Congo

- Mouth location in the Democratic Republic of the Congo

Location
- Country: Democratic Republic of the Congo

Physical characteristics
- Source
  - coordinates: 0.3497°S 20.7804°E
- Mouth: Ruki River
  - coordinates: 0.321419°S 18.982817°E
- Length: 305 kilometres (190 mi)

Basin features
- River system: Congo River
- Tributaries
  - right: Tshuapa River

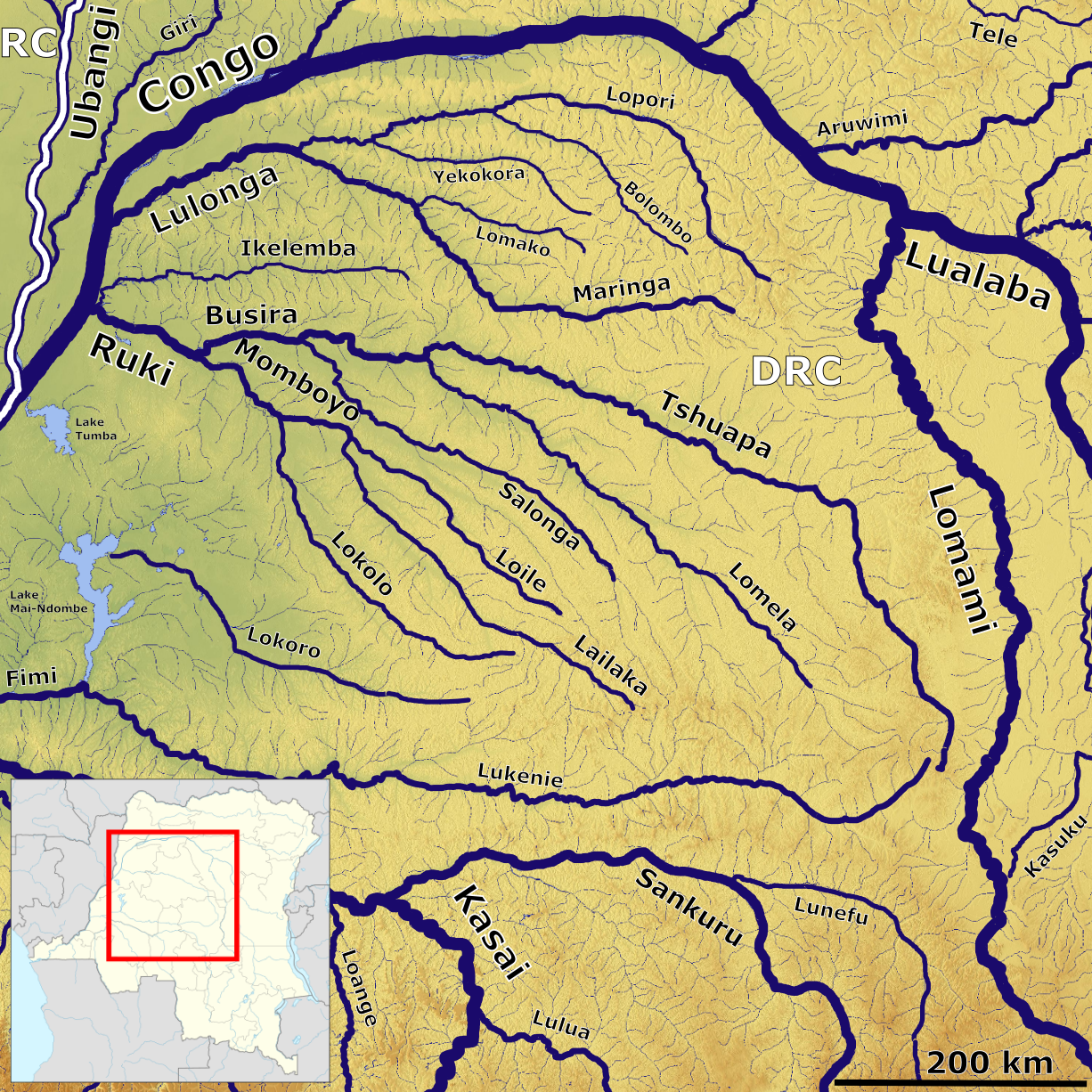
Rivers of the Central DRC

The Busira River is a river in the Democratic Republic of the Congo. It is the main tributary of the Ruki River, which in turn is a tributary of the Congo River. The Busira may be seen as the upper reach of the Ruki River. It is navigable year round.

== Location ==
The Busira River forms a few miles west of Boende where the Lomela River joins the Tshuapa River from the left. The Busira receives the Salonga River 2 kilometres (1.2 mi) upstream from Lotoko. The Momboyo River joins the Busira River from the left to form the Ruki River above Ingende. The Busira is 305 kilometres (190 mi) long, and the whole Ruki-Busira waterway is 408 kilometres (254 mi) long.

The Ruki–Busira can be navigated year round, since the depth is always more than 1 metre (3 ft 3 in) and reaches 2 metres (6 ft 7 in) in the flood period. High water is in March-April and November. Low water is in February and June-July. Villages along the Busira River include Lingunda, Boleke, Bokote and Loolo. These have markets for wild animals and for forest products from the nearby Salonga National Park. They are the main source of bushmeat in the markets of Mbandaka, where the Ruki River joins the Congo River.

== Environment ==
The Busira forms in the heart of the central depression of the Congo Basin. Rainfall here averages 2,000 millimetres (79 in) annually, with no dry season. The Tshuapa and Lomela tributaries both run through wide belts of swampland. There are swamps on the Busira and Momboyo before they join to form the Ruki. Swamps cover 55,000 hectares (140,000 acres) on the Busira between 19°00'E and 19°27'E. The Busira River feeds the Mbandaka flooded forests, and floods 925 square kilometres (357 sq mi).

Edaphic savannas, small herbaceous clearings on sandy, or loamy to clayey soil, are found beside the channels of the Busira River. They are separated from the river by a strip of gallery forest. They form on old sandbanks or dried out lagoons left behind when the river changed course. The vegetation is dominated by Hyparrhenia diplandra. The savannas are transitional and gradually disappear as they are invaded by the forest.

== Colonial period ==
As of 1 January 1894 the Société anonyme belge pour le commerce du Haut-Congo (SAB) had 83 factories and posts, including some in the French territory to the west of the Congo and Ubangi rivers. A map shows the company had posts along the upper Ruki River at Bilakamba, Bombimba, Bussira Manene, Moniaca, Bocoté and Yolongo. It also had a post at Bomputu on the Lengué (Salonga) River, and posts at Balalondzy, Ivulu and Ivuku on the Momboyo River.

The Compagnie du Congo pour le Commerce et l'Industrie (CCCI) was given the right to 150,000 hectares (120,000 acres) of land in return for its services in studying the Matadi-Léopoldville Railway project. The Compagnie du chemin de fer du Congo (CFC) was given 1,500 hectares (3,700 acres) of land for every 1 kilometre (0.62 mi) of line put into operation, as well as a strip 200 metres (660 ft) wide along the railway. The CCCI and CFC lands were mostly grouped into the Bloc de la Busira-Momboyo, created in 1901, along the Busira and Momboyo rivers. This property of 1,041,373 hectares (2,573,290 acres) was exploited by the SAB. In 1904, in the last months before the concession was taken back by the state, the SAB harvested 50 tons of dry rubber, of which 6 were from Ikelemba, 34 from Busira and 10 from Salonga Lomela.

== Sources ==
- H.B. (February 1939), "African Vegetation by W. Robyns", Journal of Ecology (article review), 27 (1), British Ecological Society: 238–240, doi:10.2307/2256312, JSTOR 2256312
- Heyse, Th. (January–May 1940), "La politique des concessions foncieres au congo belge", Revue d'histoire moderne, Nouv. Ser. Tome 9: Etudes sur l'histoire de Belgique (in French), 15e (41/42), Societe d'Histoire Moderne et Contemporaine: 88–104, JSTOR 20525978
- Hughes, R. H. (1992), A Directory of African Wetlands, IUCN, ISBN 978-2-88032-949-5
- Lederer, A. (1973), L'exploitation des affluents du Zaïre et des ports de l'intérieur de 1960 à 1971 (PDF) (in French), Académi e royal e des Sciences d'Outre-Mer: Classe des Sciences Techniques, N.S., XVII-6, Bruxelles
- Lufungula Lewono, Stanislas (2006), "Les Abus de l'Exploitation du Caoutchouc: Le cas des chefs Bonkosi et Boyenge de la Chefferie de Lingoy au Congo belge", Annales Aequatoria, 27, Honoré Vinck: 103–126, JSTOR 25836885
- "Map: Société anonyme belge pour le commerce du Haut-Congo : emplacement des 83 factoreries et postes au 1er janvier 1894", Mouvement géographique, Brussels: Institut national de géographie, 28 October 1894
- "Relation: Tshwapa (385008)", OpenStreetMap
- "Ruki River", Encyclopaedia Britannica
- Trolliet, F. (2015), Sustainability of tropical forest biodiversity and services under climate and human pressure "BIOSERF" (PDF), Brussels: Belgian Science Policy
- "Zaire (Contd.)", Source book for the inland fishery resources of Africa, vol. 1, FAO
