= Bolenge =

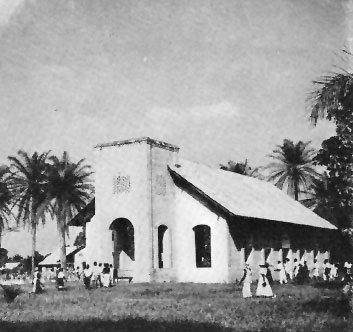
- Church in the village of Bolenge, circa 1942

- Location in the Democratic Republic of the Congo
- Coordinates: 0.0001°N 18.2167°E
- Country: Democratic Republic of the Congo

Bolenge is a village located in the Democratic Republic of the Congo. It is located exactly where the geographic equator intersects the Congo River, formerly the Zaire River.

Henry Morton Stanley reputedly stopped at Bolenge during his epic voyage across central Africa during the 19th century. In (the late 1890s) 1884 a mission station was established at nearby Wangata by the British Livingstone Inland Mission then moved to Bolenge in 1891 by the American Baptist Missionary Union Baptists. In the 1890s the local missionaries Murphy, Sjoblom and Banks were pioneers in bringing world attention to atrocities by Belgian King Leopold's Congo Free State. (Reference "Mission and State in the Congo" by David Lagergren 1970.) This mission was acquired in 1899 by the American protestant church called the Christian Church (Disciples of Christ). Eventually a network of mission stations were established throughout the Equateur province of what was at the time known as the Belgian Congo. Each mission station had a hospital and various schools and other social and economic programs.

In 1960 Congo became independent and responsibility for operation of the missions was handed over to local church authorities. Throughout the 1960s until the late 1990s Zaire (as it was then known) underwent a long period of dissolution of much of its infrastructure. Schools, roads, hospitals and commerce in general were severely degraded. In the 1990s Zaire underwent a period of dissolution of the existing dictatorship under Mobutu Sese Seko and endured a period of quasi anarchy and several multinational and civil wars. In 1997 there was a massacre of Hutu refugees perpetrated by military forces at a fishing/trading village near Bolenge. Several hundred individuals were reportedly killed with survivors of the initial attack hunted down and killed in and around Bolenge and the nearby city of Mbandaka.

In 1992 Bolenge was attacked by elements of the Zairian army. The hospital and schools and private homes were all pillaged, resulting in the evacuation of the several foreign missionary families who were living at Bolenge. In July 2005, Bolenge was again attacked by other military personnel in revenge for the murder of a soldier at the nearby military camp. The hospital was again sacked with the loss of most equipment and medicines.

Nearby Bolenge (about five kilometers south) is the Catholic Mission of Iyonda. This mission was the site of a large leprosarium and is reportedly where the British author Graham Greene spent time in gathering material for his novel A Burnt-Out Case, which is set at Iyonda in the 1950s.
