= Ingende Territory =

Ingende
- Territory
- Interactive map of Ingende
- Country: DR Congo
- Province: Équateur Province
- Time zone: UTC+1 (WAT)

Ingende Territory is a second-level administrative area (territory) in Équateur Province in the Democratic Republic of the Congo. Its headquarters is the town of Ingende.

Ingende Territory covers 17,328 km² and is divided into three administrative divisions or "sectors":

- Bokatola, with 6 groupings (groupements) and 118 villages;
- Duali, with 5 groupings (groupements) and 143 villages;
- Eungu, with 4 groupings (groupements) and 94 villages.
