= Compagnie du Kasai =

Belgian company in the Congo Free State

- Trade name: Cie du Kasai
- Industry: Resource extraction
- Founded: 1901 in Belgium
- Headquarters: Dima, Congo Free State
- Products: Rubber, palm oil, minerals

The Compagnie du Kasai (Kasai Company) was a Belgian company established to exploit the resources of the Kasai River basin in the Congo Free State. At first it was mainly involved in harvesting wild rubber, but later moved into palm oil and mining.

== Background ==
The German Hermann Wissmann explored the Kasai River in 1884 and established a short-lived commercial operation that resulted in the present day city of Kananga. The Sandford Exploring Expedition of the US started commercial operations on the river in 1887 after buying a trading post at Luebo, then in 1888 merged with the Société anonyme belge pour le commerce du Haut-Congo (SAB). In 1890 the Belgian army officer Paul Le Marinel established a military post at Lusambo. The Société Hollandaise arrived in the region in the same year, and for six years SAB and the Société Hollandaise were the only traders in the region. In 1892 rules were established for harvesting rubber, and later in the decade new companies began to move into the Kasai basin:

- La société des Produits végétaux du Haut Kasai (1894)
- Compagnie Anversoise des Plantations de la Lubefu (1897)
- Société de la Djuma et La Kasaienne (1897)
- La Loanje (1898)
- Société anonyme du Trafic Congolais (1898)
- Plantations Lacourt (1899)
- Plantations L’Est du Kwango (1899)
- Les Comptoirs Congolais Velde (1900)

A decree was issued in 1899 enforcing planting of rubber-bearing lianas, because harvesting wild lianas would not be enough to meet the expanding needs of the rubber market. By this time there were 14 companies employing 176 expatriates in 41 establishments. Cut-throat competition was keeping prices low, but also creating financial instability and reducing the amount paid to the local workers.

== Foundation ==
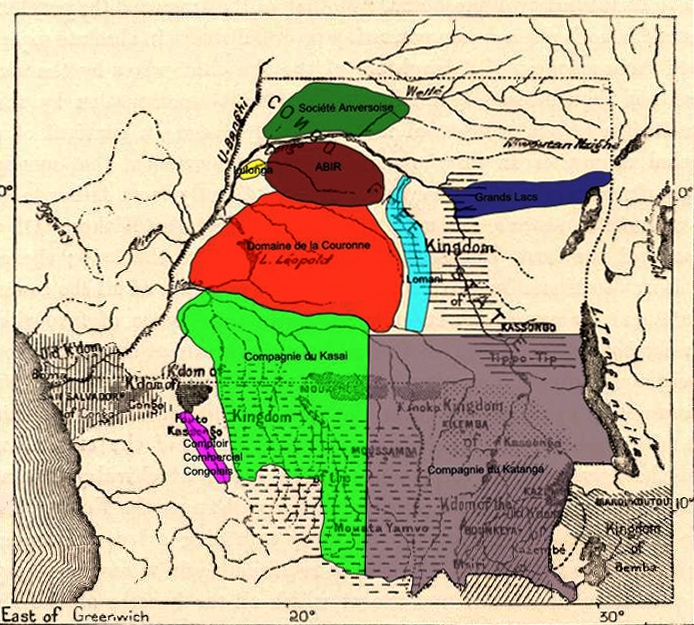
Congo Free State concession companies; Kasai (green) in southwest

The Congo Free State and the 14 companies agreed to form a new body, the Compagnie du Kasai (Kasai Company) with its head office at Dima in the Congo and administrative headquarters in Belgium. It would take over the facilities of the 14 companies such as buildings, boats and stocks, and all of their employees. The companies could keep the plantations they had created and their management, with certain restrictions. The purpose would be to harvest and trade plant products and ivory, as well as related commercial, industrial and agricultural operations. Capital of one million francs would be equally divided between the Congo Free State, which would receive half, and the 14 companies. The state would have representatives on the board of directors and management committee. The statutes of the company were published in the Official Bulletin in 1901.

The company did not receive a concession, unlike Abir or the Société Anversoise du Commerce au Congo (SCA), and its representatives were not commissioned to impose taxes. It could therefore only obtain rubber and other forest products by dealing with the natives.

== Early years (1901–1918) ==
The company began a rubber plantation at Bena Makima in October 1904. In a unique arrangement, four missionaries of the order of Scheut fathers took charge of planting rubber and of gathering wild rubber, in exchange for having their goods transported at no charge on the steamer from Kinshasa to Luebo. The missionaries ran the plantation using bonded Luba laborers, former slaves from eastern and central Kasai who had recently been liberated.

On 5 November 1904 the post was attacked by the Kuba. The Europeans managed to drive off the attackers with the help of their foreign workers, and were relieved on 9 November by soldiers of the Force Publique led by De Cock and Hubin, who arrived from the east. An official report in 1905 found that agents of the company had undertaken armed expeditions against the local people.

The company was initially profitable. In the 1905 financial year it produced 1,400 tons of rubber, or 28% of total production in the Congo Free State. In the 1906 financial year production had risen to 1,500 tons. Profits fell in 1907 due to lower selling prices in Europe, and fell again in 1908. The company decided to expand into some far eastern businesses.

In 1908 the Belgian government took over control of the Congo Free State from King Leopold II after an international campaign against the atrocities committed under his ownership, creating the colony of the Belgian Congo.

By 1910 a factory of the company had been established near Misumba, which had about two thousand inhabitants. The company had made successful trial rubber plantations there. That same year there was a dispute between the government and the company. By decree of 22 February 1910 the Kasai basin was opened to free trade. In 1911 the company bought out the state's share and became fully independent.

The company lost money in 1912 and 1913 due to the collapse of the rubber and copal markets. In 1913 the company was given the right to prospect for minerals south of the 5th parallel south and in part of the Aruwimi River basin near Kilo-Moto. There were continued losses in 1914 and 1915, when the company started to buy palm nuts, and exported 385 tons. The company was profitable in 1916 and 1917, and broke even in 1918. That year it exported 593 tons of rubber, 3,536 tons of palm kernels, 90 tons of palm oil, 5 tons of ivory and 7 tons of beeswax.

== Later history (post-1918) ==
In 1919 the company issued new shares to raise capital. Mining concessions were divided between the Société minière du Kasai and the Syndicat général de recherches minières du Kasai. All mining operations were to be undertaken by Forminière. The Société minière du Kasai, a mining subsidiary, was created in July 1920. Meanwhile, La Forminière had taken over operation of diamond mines started by the Compagnie du Kasai.

In 1922 the company was granted concessions for palm oil exploitation, consisting of five circular areas with a radius of 20 kilometres (12 mi). This now became the company's main activity. Three of the concessions were improved by creating plantations of selected palms, growing food crops, building a road network and organizing road and water transport. By 1930 the rubber trade had virtually ended.

During the economic crisis of the 1930s the company reduced its overheads as far as possible. By 1934 the company was the second largest palm oil producer in the country after Huileries du Congo Belge. By the following year it had sold shares to SAB in exchange for a 3,000-hectare (7,400-acre) plot in the Manghay region where it was cultivating coffee and cocoa trees. It had seven steam oil mills, ten manual oil mills, a coffee plant, cocoa processing plant, rubber plant and a plant for treating rice harvested by the local people. It had a 500-kilometre (310 mi) road network, a fleet of river boats and loading and unloading facilities in Léopoldville and Matadi. It also operated trading posts buying ivory, palm kernels, palm oil, peanuts, copal and textile fibers, and shops selling imported goods to expatriates and locals.

As of 1945 the company was controlled by the Société Générale de Belgique. It continued operating until at least 1955.

== Notable people ==
- Alphonse De Valkeneer (1898–1973), governor of Équateur Province from 1959 to 1960, served two terms with the Cie du Kasai from 23 April 1929 to 27 May 1934, before resigning and later joining government service.
- Alphonse van Gèle (1848–1939), was a Belgian soldier who served as the Vice-Governor General of the Congo Free State from December 1897 until January 1899. After retiring he became a director of various colonial companies including the Compagnie du Kasai.
- Léon Rom (1859–1924), a former officer of the Force Publique, who worked as an official for the Compagnie du Kasai. Rom was known for the alleged brutality of his administration in the Stanley Falls area. According to contemporary reports from white missionaries, Rom had used the severed heads of 21 Congolese to decorate the flower beds of his house at Stanley Falls.
- Louis Valcke (1857–1940), an engineer and explorer in the early days of the Congo Free State, was later a commissaire of the Société minière du Kasai and the Cie du Kasai.

== Sources ==
- Coosemans, Marthe (20 January 1953), "Valcke (Louis Pierre Alphonse)", Biographie Coloniale Belge, vol. V, Inst. roy. colon. belge
- de Cuvelier (September–October 1905), "Rapport au Roi-Souverain" (PDF), Bulletin Officiel de l'État Indépendant du Congo (in French)
- de Rosenbaum, G. (3 November 1975), "Valkeneer (DE)" (PDF), Biographie Belge d'Outre-Mer, vol. VII–B, Bruxelles: Académie royale des sciences d'Outre-mer, pp. col. 373–374
- Engels, A. (1951), "Vangele (Alphonse)" (PDF), Biographie Coloniale Belge, vol. 2, Institut royal colonial belge, pp. 928–37
- Ergo, A.-B. (29 October 2019), "La Compagnie du Kasai" (PDF), Histoire du Congo, archived from the original (PDF) on 2021-01-17
- Firchow, Peter Edgerly (2000). Envisioning Africa: Racism and Imperialism in Conrad's Heart of Darkness. Lexington: University Press of Kentucky. ISBN 9780813191980.
- Harms, Robert (1975), "The End of Red Rubber: A Reassessment", The Journal of African History, 16 (1): 73–88, doi:10.1017/S0021853700014110, JSTOR 181099
- Hochschild, Adam (2012). King Leopold's Ghost (Paperback ed.). London: Pan. ISBN 978-1-4472-1135-8.
- Marchal, Jules; Delathuy, A. M. (1996). E.D. Morel contre Léopold II. Editions L'Harmattan. ISBN 2-7384-2856-8.
- Torday, E. (July 1910), "Land and Peoples of the Kasai Basin", The Geographical Journal, 36 (1), The Royal Geographical Society (with the Institute of British Geographers): 26–53, Bibcode:1910GeogJ..36...26T, doi:10.2307/1777651, JSTOR 1777651
- United States. Bureau of Mines (1945), Foreign Minerals Survey: A Regional Review of Mineral Resources, Production and Trade
- Vansina, Jan (2010). Being colonized: the Kuba experience in rural Congo, 1880–1960. Univ of Wisconsin Press. ISBN 978-0-299-23644-1.
