= Compagnie du Congo pour le Commerce et l'Industrie =

Belgian colonial investment company

Compagnie du Congo pour le Commerce et l’Industrie
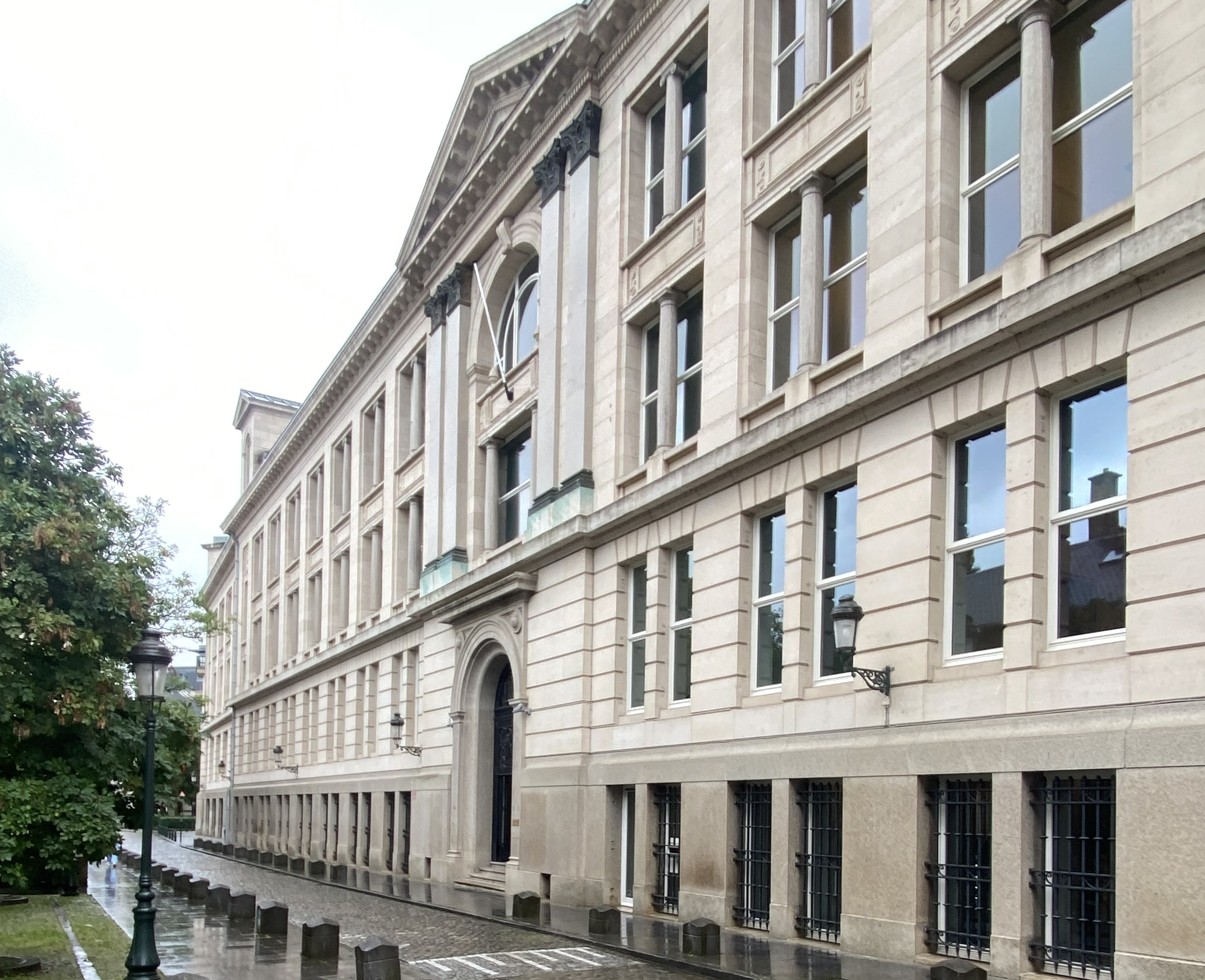
- Former CCCI building, rue Brederode 13 in Brussels, completed 1920 on a design by architect Jules Brunfaut
- Trade name: CCCI
- Industry: Transportation
- Founded: 27 December 1886 in Brussels, Belgium
- Founder: Albert Thys
- Defunct: 1971
- Successor: Compagnie du Katanga
- Headquarters: Brussels, Belgium
- Area served: Congo Free State, Belgian Coingo
- Parent: Société Générale de Belgique

The Compagnie du Congo pour le Commerce et l’Industrie (CCCI) was a major conglomerate active in the Congo Free State, Belgian Congo and later the Democratic Republic of the Congo where its subsidiary companies engaged in a wide range of activities in the Congo between 1887 and 1971. These included railway and river transport, mining, agriculture, banking, trading and so on. It was the largest commercial enterprise in the Congo for many years. It went through various mergers in the years that followed before its successor Finoutremer was liquidated in 2000.

== Foundation ==
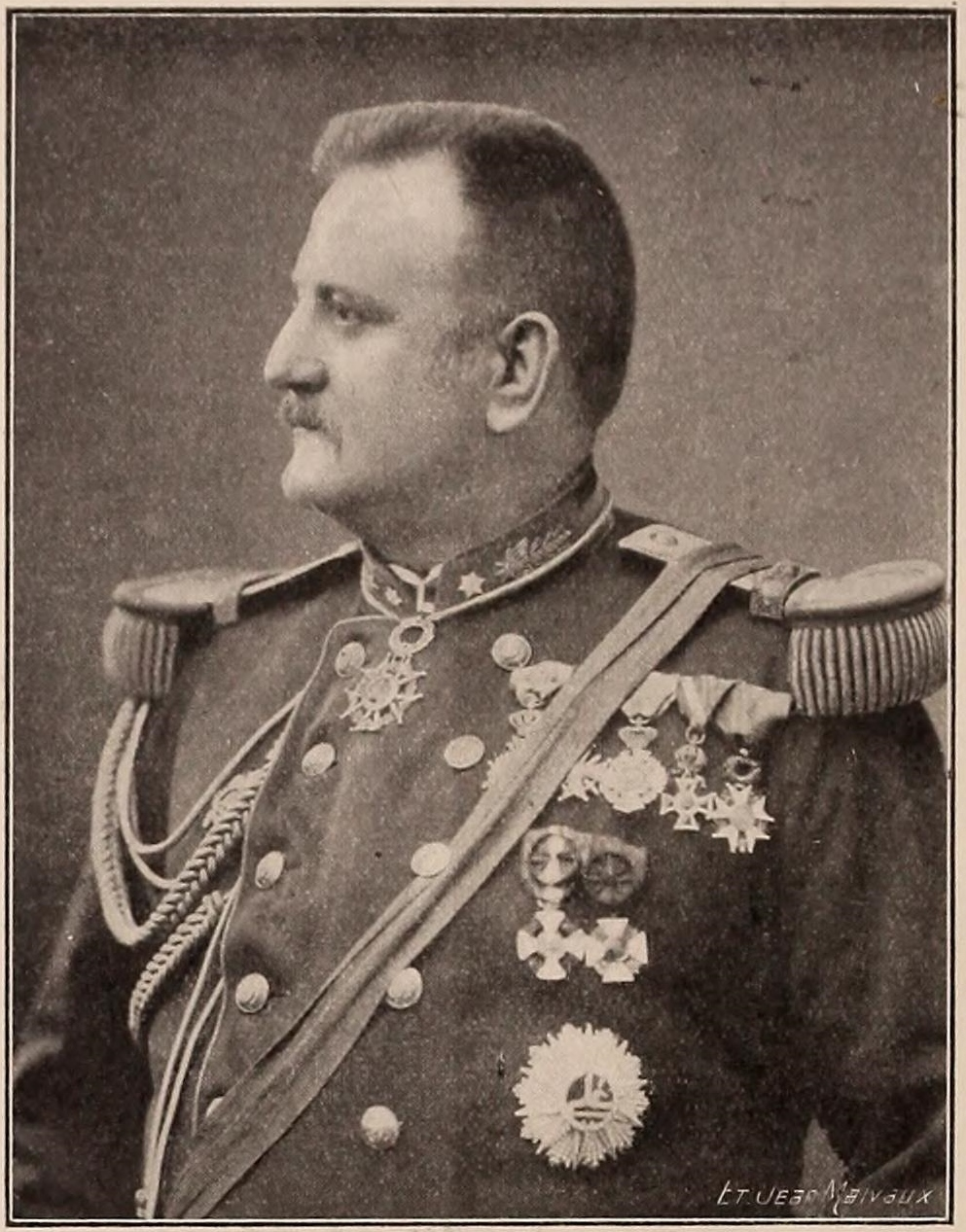
Albert Thys in 1907

When the Congo Free State was formed in 1885, King Leopold II of Belgium thought of appointing Albert Thys (1849–1915), his secretary for colonial affairs, to head the new state. Thys dissuaded him, but proposed to create the Compagnie du Congo pour le Commerce et l’Industrie (CCCI) and to go to the lower Congo in person to look into building a railway from Matadi to Léopoldville, and to set engineers to work on technical studies. The railway would bypass the rapids between the navigable lower and upper sections of the Congo River. The CCCI was created on 27 December 1886, the first Belgian colonial society to be involved in exploration and exploitation of the Congo. The financier Georges Brugmann (1829–1900) was one of the founders. King Leopold granted the CCCI extensive trading privileges since the enterprise was seen as a bastion against British interests.

On 26 March 1887 the CCCI made an agreement with the Congo Free State that gave it favorable conditions for studying a railway from the lower Congo River to Stanley Pool (Pool Malebo), the option to build the railway and operate it for 99 years, concession of all the lands needed for the railway, and concession of 150,000 hectares (370,000 acres) of freehold land. Thys organized two expeditions. One, under Captain Ernest Cambier, would consist of engineers and topographers who would determine the best route from Matadi to Léopldville. The other, under Alexandre Delcommune, would be responsible for commercial exploration of the navigable waterways of the upper Congo. As managing director of the CCCI, Thys was in charge of launching the two projects in the Congo. As a member of the king's cabinet, he was responsible for confidentially advising the king on the organization of the Congo Free State.

Thys' first trip to the Congo lasted from May 1887 to April 1888. On 2 June 1887 Thys arrived at the house in Boma on the lower Congo of Louis Valcke, director of the navy and transport of the Congo Free State. He was accompanied by members of the CCCI, and by engineers who were to study construction of the first railway in the Congo. On 8 August 1887 Valcke and Thys directed transport of five carts weighing 1,500–3,500 kilograms (3,300–7,700 lb) to Stanley Pool, which took hundreds of local laborers a month to achieve. The heavily loaded carts carried spare parts for the Roi des Belges and Ville de Bruxelles boats. In March 1888 the Léopoldville shipyards organized by Charles Liebrechts launched the Roi des Belges on the upper Congo River for the CCCI.

The first three subsidiaries of the CCCI were the Compagnie des Magasins généraux du Congo (22 October 1888), which would establish hotels and retail outlets for imports, mainly in Boma and Matadi; the Compagnie des Produits du Congo (29 November 1889), based on the Île de Mateba, which would breed cattle and trade in agricultural products; and the Société anonyme belge pour le commerce du Haut-Congo (SAB), which would take over existing companies in the upper Congo and engage in the ivory and rubber trade. In 1889 Thys founded the Banque d’Outremer, with CCCI participation, to support Belgian interests throughout the world. In July 1889 the Compagnie du chemin de fer du Congo (CCCF) was founded in Brussels with capital of 25 million francs. The Belgian government invested 6 million francs, and Belgian and foreign private investors provided the rest.

== Matadi-Léopoldville Railway ==
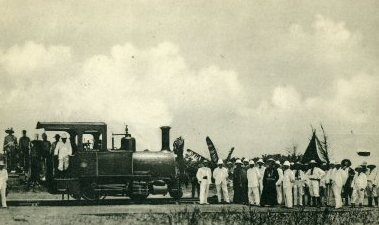
The first locomotive arrives in Léopoldville in 1898

In 1888 Valcke and the engineer Fabry reported the general route of the Matadi-Léopoldville Railway based on a sketch map drawn up by Thuys. Work on the railway began in April 1890, and progressed slowly. The terrain was difficult, all the labor had to be imported and mortality was high. After the first 30 miles (48 km) progress became faster, and the work was completed by March 1898. The railway carried five 100-ton steamers to the upper Congo River, and then carried supplies and equipment for further railway lines, such as that started in 1903 by the Compagnie des Chemins de Fer du Congo aux Grands Lacs Africains (CFL). One of the railway stations, Thysville (now Mbanza-Ngungu) was named after Albert Thys.

== Compagnie du Katanga ==
The CCCI sent an expeditionary force named the Compagnie du Katanga under Alexandre Delcommune to Katanga in September 1890. In 1891 the CCCI joined with a group of English investors to formally create the Compagnie du Katanga, which would defend Belgian interests in Katanga Province against British claims. The Compagnie du Katanga was given ownership of one third of the land in Katanga with a 99-year lease on mineral rights on the land. They were also given preferential mineral exploration rights on the other two thirds. The company explored the area and found rich deposits of copper. In 1899 the company and the Free State government formed the Comité Spécial du Katanga (CSK) to administer the whole province, with its own police force. In many ways the CSK was independent of the administration at Boma and reported directly to Brussels.

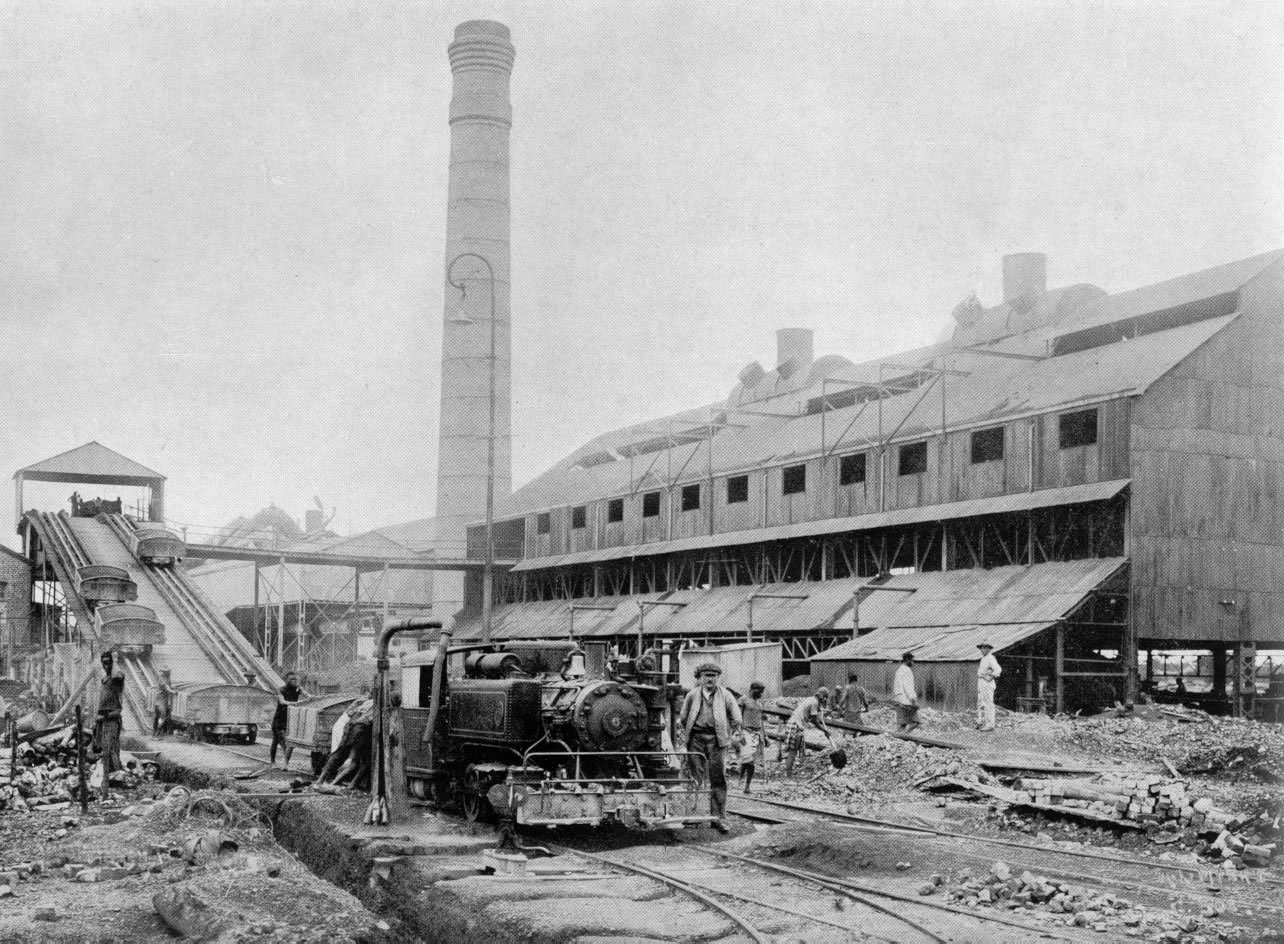
UMHK ore processing in Élisabethville (modern-day Lubumbashi) in 1917

The CSK hired Robert Williams of the Tanganyika Concessions (TCL) to prospect for minerals. In 1906 the Compagnie du Katanga, the CSK and the TCL formed the mining company Union Minière du Haut-Katanga (UMHK). In 1920 the UMHK, CCCI and several other large private enterprises set up the Syndicat Foncier du Katanga to provide financial support to settlers in Katanga. The Société Ciments du Katanga was created by royal decree on 16 January 1922 to supply cement to the rapidly growing Union Minière du Haut-Katanga (UMHK) and other companies in southern Katanga and the two Kasais. The founders included the Société Belge et Minière du Katanga, the CCCI, the Banque de Paris et des Pays-Bas, the Belgo-Katanga and others.

== Other activities ==
To raise capital, in January 1899 Thys founded the Compagnie internationale pour le commerce et l’industrie (CICI), soon after renamed the Banque d'Outremer. Its main shareholders were CCCI, the Société Générale de Belgique and the French Banque de Paris et des Pays-Bas. The Société Générale gradually took control of the Banque d'Outremer, and thus of CCCI. In 1928 the Société Générale, which had absorbed the Banque d'Outremer, made the CCCI its main holding company in the Congo.

By the 1950s the CCCI owned shares in companies that produced palm oil, coffee, tea, cocoa, rubber and cattle throughout the Congo. It controlled Forminière, the only diamond producer in the colony, and had a large indirect share of the tin producer Géomines. The CCCI had a large share of the Compagnie du Chemin de Fer du Bas-Congo au Katanga (BCK), owner of the railway from Port Franqui (Ilebo) on the Kasai River to Elizabethville (Lubumbashi) in Katanga, and of the BCK's mining subsidiary the Compagnie Miniere du BCK.

In 1957 the CCCI held large or controlling interests in the Banque du Congo Belge, Compagnie du Katanga, Comité National de Kivu, which controlled mining and agricultural concessions in Kivu Province, the Compagnie Maritime Belge, the Société des Chemins de Fer Vicinaux du Congo (VICICONGO), which ran the northern railways, the Chantier Naval et Industriel du Congo (CHANIC), which built river boats, and the Compagnie Cotonniere Congolaise (COTONCO). Associated businesses were involved in a wide range of other activities, including agriculture and mining, manufacturing, power generation and banking. Its parent, the Société Génerale, also held large or controlling shares of BCK, UMHK, Compagnie du Katanga, Forminière (diamonds) and Société minière du Bécéka.

== Post-independence (1960–2000) ==
On 21 June 1960 the CCCI became a company incorporated under Belgian law. The Democratic Republic of the Congo became independent on 30 June 1960. Between 1965 and 1971 it gradually became harder for Belgian companies to do profitable business in the Congo, and the subsidiaries of the CCCI tried to move their activities to Europe. In 1971 the CCCI and its subsidiary the Compagnie du Katanga were merged as the Compagnie Européenne et d'Outre-Mer (Euroutremer). (Note: For tax purposes the subsidiary Compagnie du Katanga took over the parent CCCI.) The Compagnie Financière du Katanga took over the assets of Euroutremer in December 1972, changing its name to Compagnie Financière Européenne et d'Outre-Mer (Finoutremer). This company was liquidated in 2000, with its assets and liabilities assumed by the Société Générale de Belgique.

== Sources ==
- American University (1962), U.S. Army Area Handbook for the Republic of the Congo, U.S. Government Printing Office
- "Compagnie du Congo pour le Commerce et l'Industrie. CCCI", Africa Museum (in French)
- Coosemans, Marthe (20 January 1953), "VALCKE (Louis Pierre Alphonse)", Biographie Coloniale Belge, vol. V, Inst. roy. colon. belge
- Cornet, Anne (26 August 2014), EEREBOUT (Augusta), Musée royal de l’Afrique centrale
- Defauwes, Georges, Albert Thys, de Dalhem au Congo (PDF) (in French), archived from the original (PDF) on 2016-01-22
- Historical Railway: Congo Railways - Leopoldville - a view of the port and the train station, 20 December 2016
- Inventaire des archives de Louis Valcke 1857 – 1940 (PDF), Tervuren: Koninklijk Museum voor Midden-Afrika, 2018
- Lemarchand, Rene (2021-01-08), Political Awakening in the Congo: The Politics of Fragmentation, Univ of California Press, ISBN 978-0-520-33862-3
- Moulaert, G. (12 February 1952), "LIEBRECHTS (Charles Adolphe Marie)", Biographie Coloniale Belge (in French), vol. III, Inst. roy. colon. belge, pp. col. 556-56
- Oliver, Roland; Sanderson, G.N., eds. (1975), The Cambridge History of Africa, Cambridge University Press, ISBN 978-0-521-22803-9
- Pary, J., Les matériaux de construction, l'industrie Katangaise. Réalisation et prospective, 1955-1960.
- Tilman, Samuel (2005), "BRIGMANN, Georges, Edmond" (PDF), Nouvelle Biographie Nationale (in French), vol. 8, Académie Royale de Belgique
- Yav, André (1990). History from below: the Vocabulary of Elisabethville by André Yav : texts, translation, and interpretive essay. John Benjamins Publishing Company. ISBN 90-272-5227-0.
