= Bolomba Territory =

Bolomba
- Territory
- Interactive map of Bolomba
- Coordinates: 00°21′02″N 19°13′49″E
- Country: Democratic Republic of the Congo
- Province: Équateur Province

Area
  - Total: 24,598 km^{2} (9,497 sq mi)

Population
  - Languages: Lomongo Lingombe French
- Time zone: UTC+1 (West Africa Time)

Bolomba Territory is an administrative area in Équateur Province in the Democratic Republic of the Congo. The headquarters is the town of Bolomba. It is located northeast of the provincial capital of Mbandaka. Its main waterway is the Ikelemba River which is navigable down to the Congo River.

== History ==
The territory of Bolomba was included in the Équateur District when the Congo Free State was established, annexed by Belgium in 1908, and passed into Équateur Province in 1917. In the reorganizations of 1962, 1966 and 2015 it remained in the core Équateur area.

== Administrative subdivisions ==
Bolomba Territory is divided into five administrative divisions or "sectors":

Dianga, with 4 sub-groupings (groupements) and 46 villages;
Mampoko, with 3 sub-groupings (groupements) and 43 villages;
Bolomba, with 7 sub-groupings (groupements) and 112 villages;
Busira, with 6 sub-groupings (groupements) and 78 villages; and
Losanganya, with 4 sub-groupings (groupements) and 113 villages.

== Geography and climate ==
The Bolomba Territory is mainly evergreen deciduous forest, except where it has been clear-cut. The area is low-lying with respect to the Ikelemba River and is subject to either regular annual inundation or flooding in wet years.

== Ethnology ==
Bolomba is primarily inhabited by Bantu tribes of the Mongo and the western branch of the Ngombe (water-people), with some dependent pygmy communities known as "Balumbe". The Mongo there are divided into the Eleku and the Baenga. The predominant languages are Lomongo and Lingombe. The primary occupation is fishing.
