= Salonga River =

River in Democratic Republic of the Congo

- Mouth location in the Democratic Republic of the Congo

Location
- Country: Democratic Republic of the Congo

Physical characteristics
- Mouth: Busira River
  - coordinates: 0.288243°S 19.899050°E
- Length: 305 kilometres (190 mi)

Basin features
- River system: Congo River

The Salonga River is a river in the Democratic Republic of the Congo. It is a tributary of the Busira River.

== Course ==
The river's name is said to come from a mispronunciation of "nsao'loonga", the local name of a bird. The Salonga River meanders in a generally northwest direction through the Salonga National Park and on to its confluence with the Busira River. The Salonga National Park is the largest forest national park in Africa, with an area of 33,350 square kilometres (12,880 sq mi). The river enters the Busira 2 kilometres (1.2 mi) upstream from Lotoko. It is navigable all year with 50 ton barges up to Watsi-Kengo.

== Sources ==
- Lederer, A. (1973), L'exploitation des affluents du Zaïre et des ports de l'intérieur de 1960 à 1971 (PDF) (in French), Académi e royal e des Sciences d'Outre-Mer: Classe des Sciences Techniques, N.S., XVII-6, Bruxelles
- "Relation: Salonga (380844)", OpenStreetMap
- Salonga Landscape, WWF
