= Société anonyme belge pour le commerce du Haut-Congo =

Former Belgian colonial company

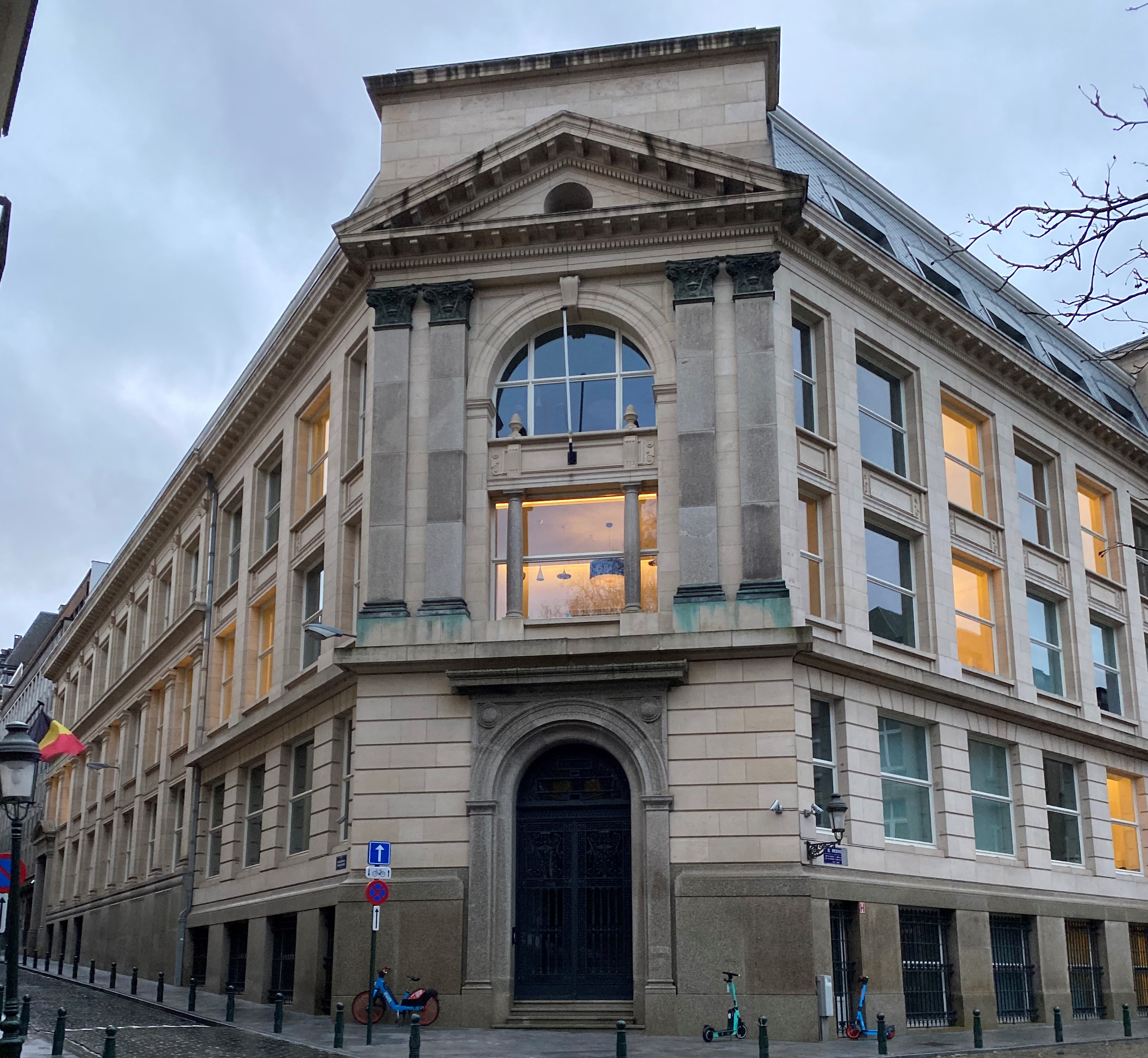
- Former Brussels head office, rue Brederode 15
- Trade name: SAB
- Industry: Trade and industry
- Founded: 10 December 1888 in Brussels, Belgium
- Founder: Albert Thys
- Headquarters: Brussels, Belgium
- Area served: Congo Free State, Belgian Coingo

The Société anonyme belge pour le commerce du Haut-Congo (SAB) was a private enterprise in the Congo Free State, later the Belgian Congo, that operated a string of trading stations in the Congo River basin, and exported ivory, rubber and other local products. The ruthless treatment of the local people by SAB agents inspired Joseph Conrad to write his 1899 novel Heart of Darkness. The company was founded by Albert Thys in 1888 as a subsidiary of the Compagnie du Congo pour le Commerce et l'Industrie (CCCI).

== Foundation ==
The Compagnie du Congo pour le Commerce et l'Industrie CCCI was created by Albert Thys on 27 December 1886, the first Belgian colonial society to be involved in exploration and exploitation of the Congo.

The Sanford Exploring Expedition was created by the American businessman Henry Shelton Sanford in 1886 to trade along the upper Congo River, with concessions granted by King Leopold II of Belgium. The company brought the first commercial steamer up to Stanley Pool, the Florida, and in 1887 bought another steamer, the New York. It founded posts at Matadi, Kinshasa, Luebo and Equateur (Mbandaka). By 1888 the company was running out of money, and attempted without success to obtain funding from various American businessmen. At the end of 1888 the Sanford Exploring Expedition merged with the CCCI to create the SAB.

The Société anonyme belge pour le commerce du Haut-Congo (SAB) was founded on 10 December 1888. It was the third subsidiary of the CCCI. The headquarters were at 15, rue Bréderode, Bruxelles. Albert Thys was president and Baron Louis Weber de Treuenfels was vice-president. The capital was originally set at 1,200,00 francs. This was increased to 3 million francs on 31 January 1890 and to 5 million francs on 16 April 1892.

The SAB was the first Belgian corporation to engage in Congo export commerce. The SAB would take over existing companies in the upper Congo and engage in the ivory and rubber trade. Its purpose was defined as commercial, industrial, mining and other operations, within the broadest limits, throughout the country and especially in the territory of the Independent State of Congo.

== Transport ==
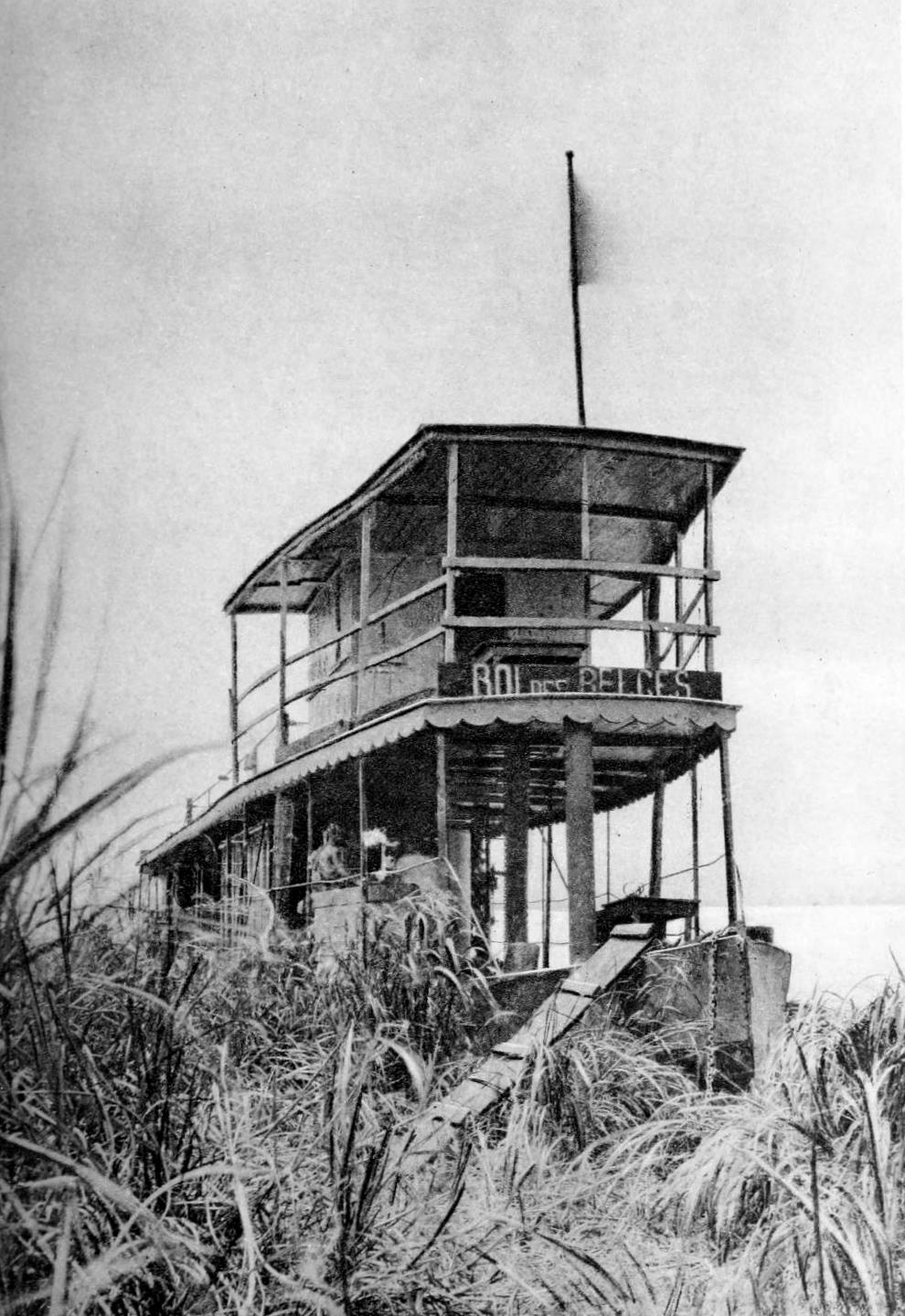
Roi des Belges, in which Joseph Conrad sailed up the Congo River (1890)

On 8 August 1887 Thys and Louis Valcke directed transport of five carts weighing 1,500–3,500 kilograms (3,300–7,700 lb) to Stanley Pool, which took hundreds of local laborers a month to achieve. The heavily loaded carts carried spare parts for the Roi des Belges and Ville de Bruxelles boats. The CCCI and its subsidiary SAB established a steamer service on the Congo in January 1890. However they were hampered by the policy of the Free State which was opposed to competition from the private sector in the field of river transport.

The steamer "Brugmann" was built by the John Cockerill shipyard in Hoboken, Antwerp, for SAB (Société Anonyme Belge pour le Commerce du Haut-Congo), April 1898. Regulations for the captains of the steamers in 1903 included:

4. The captain alone chooses the camp sites. All black personnel and passengers must spend the night ashore, unless the captain decides otherwise. 5. The captain will ensure that the boat leaves as soon as dawn ; the daily navigation time will be at least nine hours ... 9. ... The Captain will take care that the men of his crew or the passengers do not arouse any difficulty with the natives of the stopovers... Special regulations on board:... No blacks can have access to the part of the steamer reserved for travelers, except for the service of the boat, as determined by the captain ... The captain has the right to examine the baggage of all the natives on board. It is strictly forbidden to European or native staff to engage in any trade and particularly to buy ivory and curiosities ... The mechanic will never leave his machine for any pretext ... He will take his meals near the machine while the steamer will be running.

A new transport company named Compagnie Industrielle et de Transports au Stanley Pool (CITAS) was founded in 1907, which took over the Léopoldville facilities of the SAB and the Société Belgica. Presidents would include Albert Thys, Alexandre Delcommune and Maurice Lippens.

== Trading and extraction ==
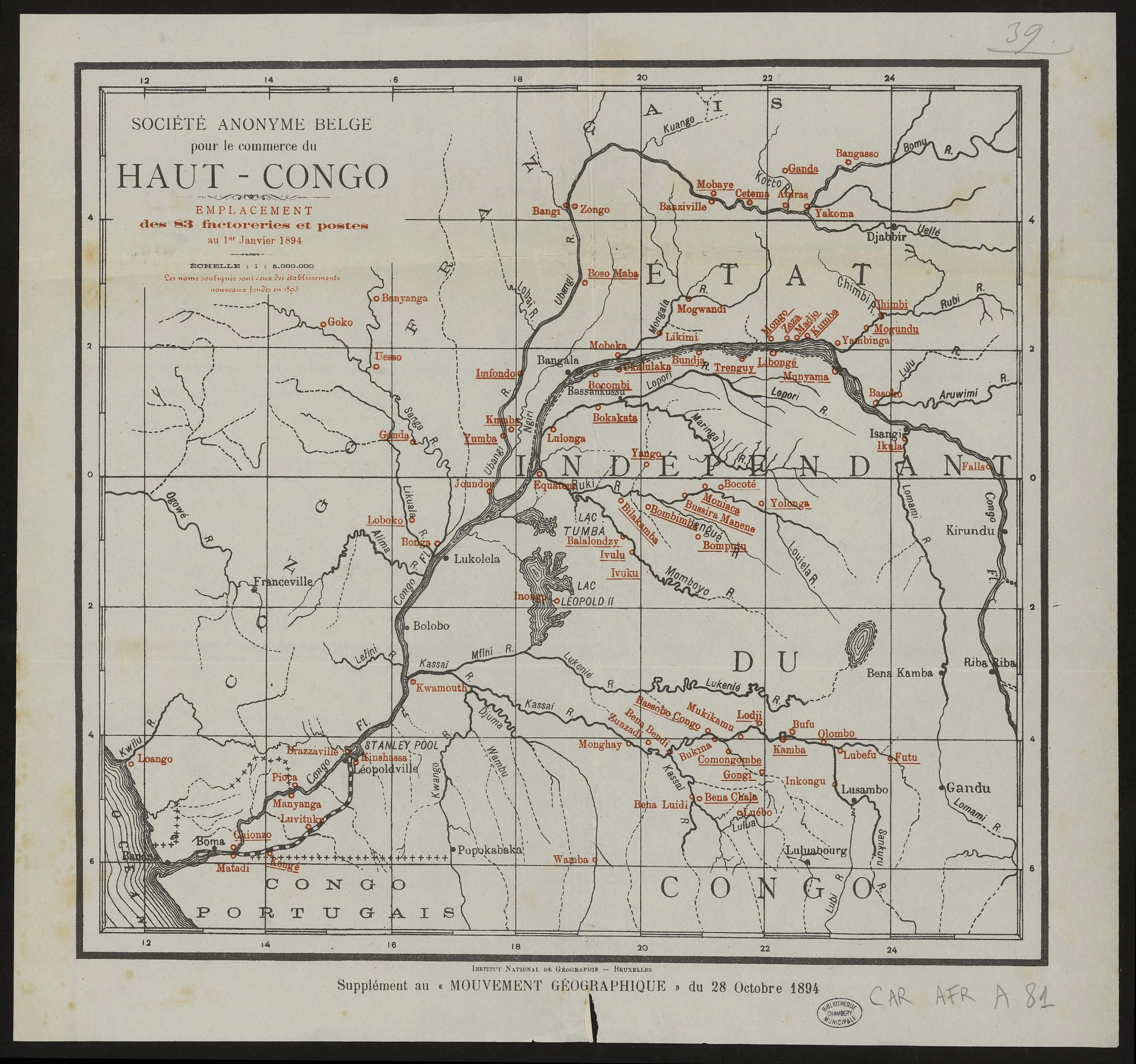
Map showing 83 factories and posts of the SAB in 1894

Louis Valcke returned to the Congo in July 1889 on behalf of the SAB, where he replaced Major Parminter as director until March 1890. He established trading posts of this company as far as the Stanley Falls (Boyoma Falls). As of 1 January 1894 the company had 83 factories and posts, including some in the French territory to the west of the Congo and Ubangi rivers. In 1895 12 of the SAB's 68 trading posts were in French territory. In 1900 the concession system was established in the French territory, and presumably SAB direct involvement there ended.

The CCCI was given the right to 150,000 hectares (120,000 acres) of land in return for its services in studying the Matadi-Léopoldville Railway project. The Compagnie du chemin de fer du Congo (CFC) was given 1,500 hectares (3,700 acres) of land for every 1 kilometre (0.62 mi) of line put into operation, as well as a strip 200 metres (660 ft) wide along the railway. The CCCI and CFC lands were mostly grouped into the Bloc de la Busira-Momboyo, created in 1901, along the Busira and Momboyo rivers. This property of 1,041,373 hectares (2,573,290 acres) was exploited by the SAB. Between 1902 and 1910 the SAB sublet most of its activities to the Compagnie du Kasaï and Société du Busira concession companies. After this, SAB began to expand again as the concession system was gradually phased out.

Before 1920 the economy of the Congo was essentially based on harvesting natural products. Rubber and ivory generated the largest part of the revenues of companies such as SAB and of the state. However, SAB made efforts to spread the species that produced the most rubber. In 1893 SAB created a string of rubber plantations in the Busira concession, but most rubber was gathered from wild vines in the rainforests. Collection of rubber did not require much skill: the rubber-bearing vine was cut and its sap drained into a bucket. However, the villagers were brutally forced to meet quotas by the Force Publique, and this meant they had to travel deep into the flooded forest for days on end during the rainy season. They made no profit from the rubber, but ran short of food because they could not cultivate their crops at the most important time of the year.

By 1934 the Compagnie du Kasai was the second largest palm oil producer in the country after HCB. By 1935 it had sold shares to the SAB in exchange for a 3,000 hectares (7,400 acres) plot in the Manghay region where it was cultivating coffee and cocoa trees. On 26 June 1937 the "Bus Bloc" of the SAB was returned to the state, a huge area of 1,041,773 hectares (2,574,280 acres). The SAB was compensated financially and in land.

== Heart of Darkness ==
Joseph Conrad's novel Heart of Darkness (1899) draws on what he heard or experienced of SAB operations.

In the first half of November 1889 Conrad went to Brussels to meet Albert Thys, then the deputy director of SAB, to discuss employment in Africa. After Johannes Freiesleben, Danish master of the steamship Florida, was murdered by Congo tribesmen on 29 January 1890, Conrad was appointed by Thys' company to take his place. On 10 May 1890, at Bordeaux, he boarded the SS Ville de Maceio to begin what Zdzisław Najder calls "the most traumatic journey of his life." En route to the Congo, near Grand-Popo, Benin, Conrad saw a French man-of-war, Le Seignelay, shelling a native camp hidden in the jungle. The incident would acquire symbolic import in Heart of Darkness. Conrad reached Boma on 12 June 1890 and went on to Matadi, where he met Roger Casement, who later wrote a 1904 report on atrocities perpetrated against the native Congolese population.

Conrad went overland to Léopoldville, which he reached on 2 August 1890, and took passage on the river steamer Roi des Belges. During the long journey to Stanley Falls (Kisangani) he saw few villages, since the native population had fled from the colonial forces. At Stanley Falls on 6 September 1890 he was temporarily given command of Roi des Belges for the return journey while its captain recovered from a sickness. During this journey Georges-Antoine Klein, who had recently been appointed the company's commercial agent at Stanley Falls, died of dysentery. His name (later changed to "Kurtz") appears in the manuscript of Heart of Darkness; otherwise the Frenchman seems not to have had much in common with the novel's character. Conrad fell sick, returned to the coast and left Africa. His African experience made him one of the fiercest critics of the "white man's mission".

== Sources ==
- "Compagnie Industrielle et de Transports au Stanley Pool . CITAS", Africa Museum
- Coosemans, Marthe (20 January 1953), "VALCKE (Louis Pierre Alphonse)", Biographie Coloniale Belge, vol. V, Inst. roy. colon. belge
- Cornet, Anne (26 August 2014), EEREBOUT (Augusta), Musée royal de l'Afrique centrale
- Defauwes, Georges, Albert Thys, de Dalhem au Congo (PDF) (in French), archived from the original (PDF) on 22 January 2016
- De Roo, Bas, Negotiating colonial tariff policies. Customs and commerce in the Congo (1886–1914) (PDF) (thesis)
- Ergo, A.-B. (29 October 2019), "La Compagnie du Kasai" (PDF), Histoire du Congo, archived from the original (PDF) on 17 January 2021
- Gondola, Ch. Didier (2002), The History of Congo, Greenwood Publishing Group, ISBN 978-0-313-31696-8
- Hayes, Th. (January–May 1940), "La politique des concessions foncieres au Congo belge" (PDF), Revue d'histoire moderne, Nouv. Ser. Tome 9: Etudes sur l'histoire de Belgique, 15e (41/42), Societe d'Histoire Moderne et Contemporaine: 88–104, JSTOR 20525978
- Heyse, Th. (January–May 1940), "La politique des concessions foncieres au congo belge", Revue d'histoire moderne, Nouv. Ser. Tome 9: Etudes sur l'histoire de Belgique (in French), 15e (41/42), Societe d'Histoire Moderne et Contemporaine: 88–104, JSTOR 20525978
- Images des entreprises belges au Congo (PDF) (Exposition program) (in French), Brussels: Archives générales du Royaume, 20 October 2007
- "Map: Société anonyme belge pour le commerce du Haut-Congo : emplacement des 83 factoreries et postes au 1er janvier 1894", Mouvement géographique, Brussels: Institut national de géographie, 28 October 1894
- Najder, Zdzisław (2007), Joseph Conrad: A Life, Camden House, ISBN 978-1-57113-347-2
- Plas, J.; Pourbaix, Victor (1899), Les Sociétés Commerciales Belges de l'État Indépendant du Congo (PDF), Brussels
- White, James P. (22 January 2009), "The Sanford Exploring Expedition", The Journal of African History, 8 (2), Cambridge University Press: 291–302, doi:10.1017/S0021853700007064
