= Équateur Province =

Province of the Democratic Republic of the Congo

Équateur Province de l'Équateur (French)
- Province
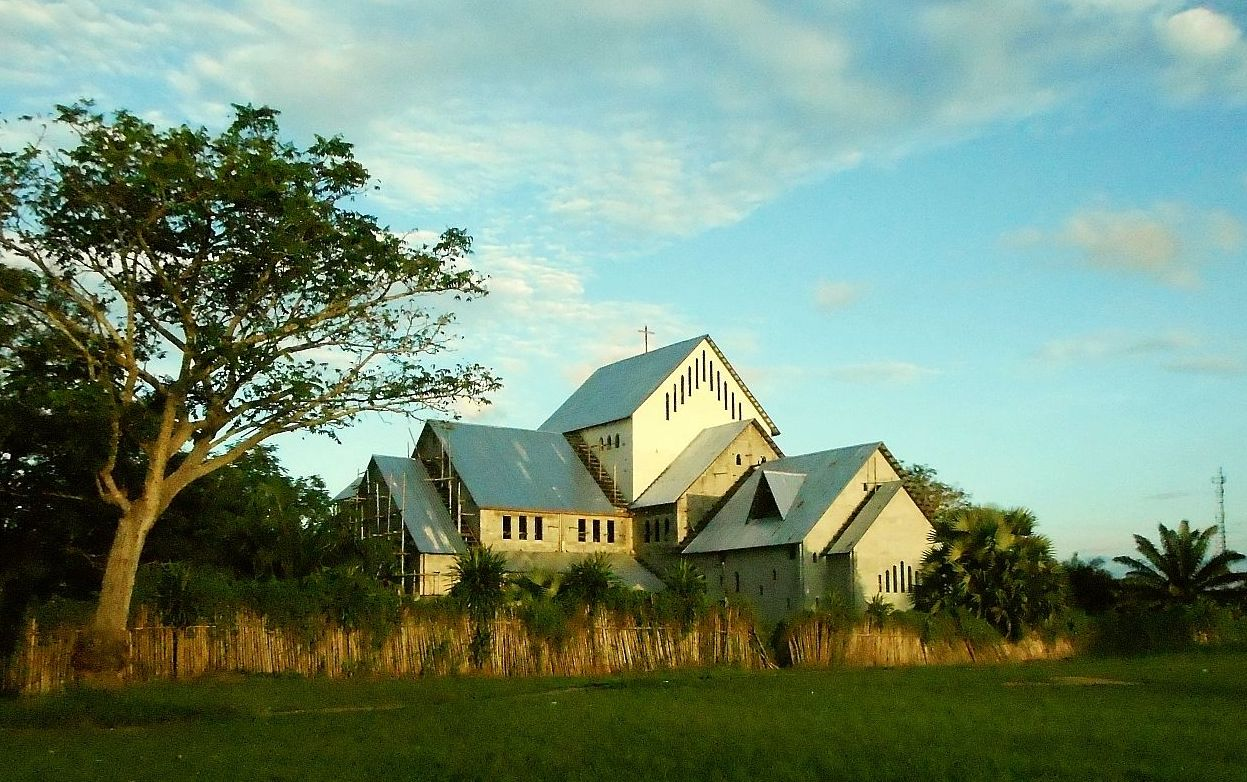
- Basankusu Cathedral

- Country: DR Congo
- Established: 2015
- Named for: The Equator
- Capital: Mbandaka

Government
  - Governor: Bobo Boloko

Area
  - Total: 103,902 km^{2} (40,117 sq mi)
  - Rank: 11th

Population (2020 est.)
  - Total: 1,856,000
  - Rank: 22nd
  - Density: 17.86/km^{2} (46.26/sq mi)
- Demonym: Equatorian

Ethnic groups
  - Native: Anamongo • Batwa • Ngombe • Babangi • Baloi • Babala • Babolia
- Time zone: UTC+1 (WAT)
- License Plate Code: (Democratic Republic of the Congo) CGO / 03
- Official language: French
- National language: Lingala

Équateur is one of the 21 newest provinces of the Democratic Republic of the Congo created by the 2015 repartitioning. The provinces of Équateur, Mongala, Nord-Ubangi, Sud-Ubangi, and Tshuapa are the result of the division of the former Équateur province. The current province was formed from the Équateur district and the independently administered city of Mbandaka which retained its status as a provincial capital.

The 2020 population was estimated to be 1,856,000.

== History ==
The province of Équateur created in 1917 was much larger than today. Over time it went through a number of border and name changes. Under Article 2 of the 2006 Constitution it was to assume its current boundaries, but administratively they were not finalized until 2015.

== Administrative divisions ==
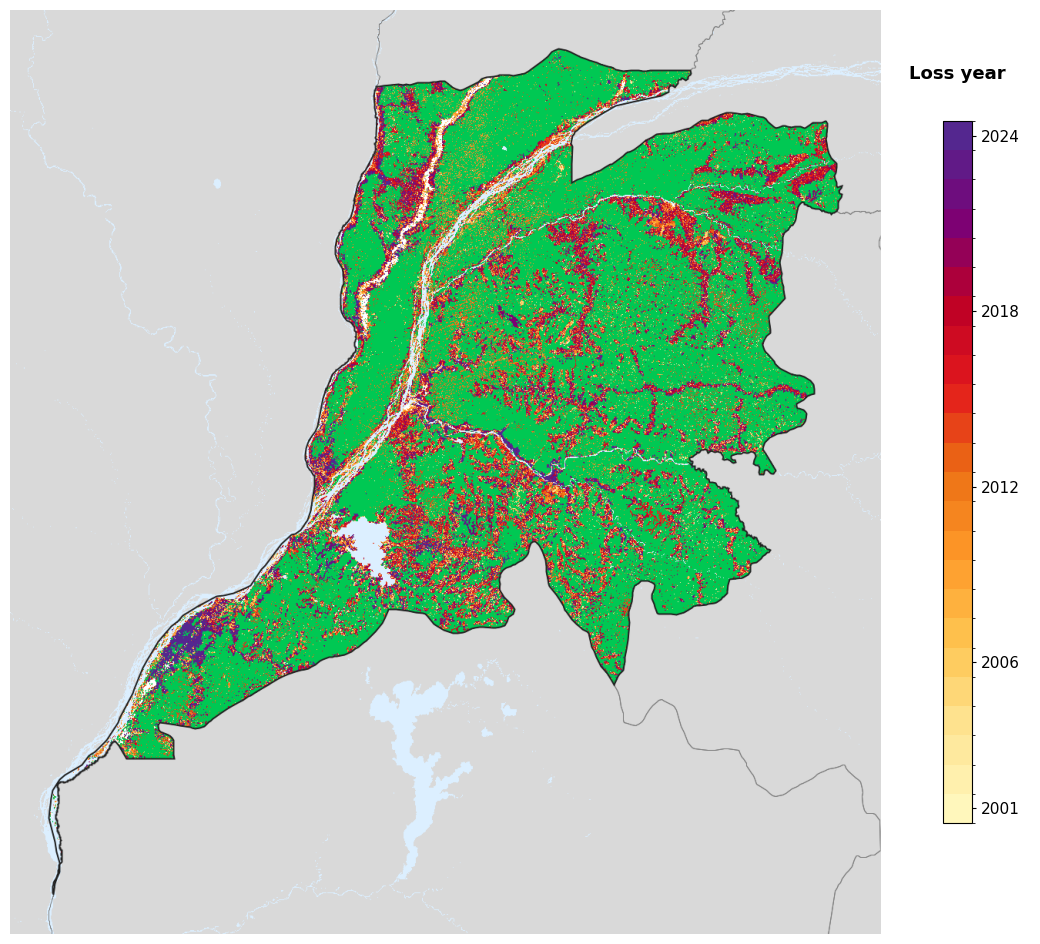
Tree-cover loss year in Équateur, 2001-2024, from the Global Forest Change dataset.

The province consists of eight administrative subdivisions, one of which is the provincial capital, Mbandaka; and seven of which are territories:

Administrative division	Type	Map
Mbandaka	City	Mbandaka
Basankusu	Territory	Basankusu
Bikoro	Territory	Bikoro
Bolomba	Territory	Bolomba
Bomongo	Territory	Bomongo
Ingende	Territory	Ingende
Lukolela	Territory	Lukolela
Makanza	Territory	Makanza

== See also ==
- Bolenge

== See also ==
- Équateur province topics
- Équateur (former province)
