= Wamba, Luo Reserve =

Wamba
- Location within Democratic Republic of the Congo
- Coordinates: 0.026779°N 22.548752°E
- Country: DR Congo
- Province: Tshuapa
- Territory: Ikela
- Time zone: UTC+1 (West Africa Time)

Wamba is a village in the Luo Scientific Reserve, Tshuapa province of the Democratic Republic of the Congo. It is inhabited by Bongando people. The reserve is home to bonobos, threatened due to hunting.

The 150 square kilometres (58 sq mi) Wamba forest is home to an important population of bonobos. It was founded in 1973 by Takayoshi Kano, who surveyed the forests of Congo, covering 2,000 km on bicycle. After travelling through occasionally hostile villages, he found Wamba to be friendly, and he could hear bonobo calls from the forest, so he decided to set up a research station here. In 1974, his student Suehisa Kuroda went to Wamba and identified three groups of bonobos, one of which they were able to habituate after a year, by provisioning a sugarcane field.

In the past, the local people co-existed with the bonobos and had taboos against eating bushmeat. These have broken down as villagers were forced to hide in the forest during two civil wars. By 2005 an area that once held 300 bonobos now held just 22, with a serious risk of extinction.

Under the Bonobo Conservation Initiative, a reforestation project is planned for the Maringa-Lopori-Wamba Landscape in an attempt to counter the destruction of bonobo habitat and increase areas where the bonobo are protected. 5,000 hectares (12,000 acres) will be replanted, forming corridors to link existing patches of forest, with the project funded by sale of carbon credits.
