= Kokolopori Bonobo Reserve =

Nature reserve in the Democratic Republic of the Congo

- Kokolopori Bonobo Nature Reserve
- Location within Democratic Republic of the Congo
- Location: Djolu Territory, Tshuapa; Democratic Republic of the Congo
- Coordinates: 0.0774°S 22.8422°E
- Area: 4,875 km^{2} (1,882 sq mi)
- Established: 2003 (local accords); May 2009 (official recognition)
- Operator: Kokolopori communities Vie Sauvage

The Kokolopori Bonobo Reserve is a nature reserve in the Democratic Republic of the Congo. The 4,875-square-kilometre (1,882 sq mi) reserve is a protected area for endangered bonobos and uses a community-based model of natural resource management undertaken by residents of the villages of Kokolopori and the local conservation organisation Vie Sauvage.

The reserve was founded in 2003 through accords between local villages and Vie Sauvage with assistance from the Bonobo Conservation Initiative. It was formally recognized by the DRC government in 2009. Located in the Djolu Territory of Tshuapa, the reserve hosts 1,000 to 1,800 bonobos. Scientific research in the reserve is centred on four bonobo communities that have been habituated to the presence of humans.

== Location and geography ==
The Kokolopori Bonobo Reserve is a 4,875-square-kilometre (1,882 sq mi) reserve located in the Djolu Territory of Tshuapa province that encompasses the 35 villages of Kokolopori. The reserve is situated within the Cuvette Centrale, a region of lowland wetlands and tropical forests of the Maringa-Lopori-Wamba Landscape.

Kokolopori is geographically linked to the Luo Scientific Reserve by the Iyondji Community Bonobo Reserve, a smaller community-managed reserve which lies to its west.

== History ==
Kokolopori local Albert Lotana Lokasola founded the wildlife and forest conservation organisation Vie Sauvage in 1999. He met with representatives of each of the Kokolopori villages and began the process of establishing protected zones for bonobos. Early efforts for the reserve involved environmental education, creating wildlife inventories, training trackers and eco-guards, and starting the process of habituating local bonobo populations to humans. In 2001, Lokasola sought support for the conservation efforts in Kokolopori from the United States organisation Bonobo Conservation Initiative (BCI).

The Kokolopori Bonobo Reserve began in 2003 with the signing of accords between local residents and the non-governmental organisations (NGOs) Vie Sauvage and the Bonobo Conservation Initiative. The agreements stipulated that the Kokolopori would provide for the protection of the bonobos and their habitat while the NGOs would provide health care and employment. The accords allocated parts of the forest for agriculture and allowed limited hunting within the reserve, forbidding wire snare traps.

Beginning in 2003, Kokolopori locals received salaries for monitoring groups of bonobos. NGO projects within the reserve have included a health clinic, agricultural initiatives, and a microcredit program providing sewing machines for women. After a mosaic virus destroyed nearly 80% of the cassava yields, NGOs including Vie Sauvage and BCI worked with a local agricultural cooperative and the South-East Consortium for International Development to import cassava varieties resistant to the virus.

The Bonobo Conservation Initiative implemented the Information Exchange program, allowing for structured feedback and knowledge sharing between the NGOs and the local residents. As a community-managed nature reserve, Kokolopori Bonobo Reserve is a model for the Bonobo Peace Forest, a project to create contiguous protected habitat for bonobos through a network of community-managed reserves.

The Kokolopori Bonobo Reserve was formally recognized as a protected area by the DRC government in May 2009.

== Research projects ==
Four groups of bonobos within the Kokolopori Bonobo Reserve have become habituated to humans: Ekalakala, Kokoalongo, Fekako, and Bekako. Beginning in 2007, bonobos near Yetee village were habituated to the presence of researchers.

The Kokolopori Bonobo Research Project was established in 2016 with assistance from the Max Planck Society. The long-term project is led by scientists from Harvard University and the Max Planck Institute for Evolutionary Anthropology. It maintains a research camp and a team of local trackers who follow three of the habituated bonobo communities: Ekalakala, Fekako, and Kokoalongo. The project collaborates with the Congolese Ministry of Research, the Bonobo Conservation Initiative, and Vie Sauvage. It also supports school construction in the region.

Research on bonobos within the Kokolopori Bonobo Reserve has focussed on tool use, intergroup encounters, and seed predation. Research published in 2021 found that truffles were a food source for the bonobos, predominantly the newly described species Hysterangium bonobo.

== Wildlife populations ==
Bonobos are an endangered species and are only found south of the Congo River in the Democratic Republic of the Congo. Estimates of the population of bonobos within the Kokolopori Bonobo Reserve range from 1,000 to 1,800. A 2013 study found that 64% of the reserve had suitable conditions for bonobo habitat.

Aside from bonobos, Kokolopori is home to eleven primate species including the Dryas monkey and Thollon's red colobus. Other endemic species include the African golden cat, the sitatunga, the Congo forest buffalo, the bongo, the leopard, the dwarf crocodile, and the frog Congolius robustus Several endangered species of birds live within the reserve, including the grey parrot. The reserve also hosts the near-endemic Congo sunbird, Congo peafowl, the African river martin, the Congo martin, and the yellow-legged weaver. African forest elephants have been observed using the reserve as a migration route.

== See also ==
- Lola ya Bonobo, a bonobo sanctuary
- Sankuru Nature Reserve
- Wildlife of the Democratic Republic of the Congo
