= Kokolopori =

Kokolopori is a community of 35 villages in Djolu territory of Tshuapa province, Democratic Republic of the Congo. Kokolopori is an ethnically Mongandu Congolese community of about 24,000 people. It is located within the Kokolopori Bonobo Reserve, a 4,875 square kilometres (1,882 sq mi) community-based reserve using the Man and the Biosphere conservation model. The Reserve was established by a local nongovernmental organization, Vie Sauvage, together with an American partner organization, the Bonobo Conservation Initiative, and was formally recognized by the DRC government in 2009.

Bonobos (Pan paniscus) are one of the four species of great ape which live in the Democratic Republic of Congo - the others being human, chimpanzee (Pan troglodytes) and eastern gorilla (Gorilla beringei). The Kokolopori Bonobo Reserve is the site of a long-term bonobo research project led by scientists from Harvard University and the Max Planck Institute for Evolutionary Anthropology.

Vie Sauvage, the managing organization of the Kokolopori Bonobo Reserve, also manages Djolu Technical College (Institut Supérieur de Développement Rural de Djolu). The College is the only accredited rural development college in Tshuapa Province, and the only accredited higher education institution in Djolu Territory. It offers three majors: Environment and Sustainable Development, Water and Forests, and Nursing and Public Health. For the 2022 academic year, Djolu Technical College has also opened an extension in Kokolopori that will offer the Water and Forests major.
