= Sankuru Nature Reserve =

- Réserve naturelle du Sankuru
- Location within Democratic Republic of the Congo
- Coordinates: 2°36′36″S 24°10′48″E
- Area: 3,057,000 ha (11,800 sq mi)

Sankuru Nature Reserve (French: Réserve naturelle du Sankuru) is a protected area in the Democratic Republic of the Congo. It was created in November 2007 to protect a forest area home to bonobo, okapi and African forest elephant. The reserve has not been managed effectively, and suffers from ongoing deforestation and bushmeat hunting.

== Creation ==
The Réserve Naturelle du Sankuru (RNSA) was created by ministerial decree on 6 November 2007, with an area of 30,570 square kilometres (11,800 sq mi). The purpose was to protect the Sankuru and Lokenye hydrographic basin to guarantee the flows of rivers in the Congo Basin and to conserve important animal biodiversity, including specifically the Bonobo, Okapi and Forest Elephant.

== Description ==
The Sankuru Nature Reserve is the first large reserve in the Congo to be managed by indigenous people. It is the largest continuous protected area for great apes in the world. It won the first REDD+ (Reducing emissions from deforestation and forest degradation) contract in the Democratic Republic of the Congo. REDD+ fights climate change, but also protects biodiversity and supports local people. Fauna include bonobo, okapi, elephants, Hamlyn's monkey, blue monkey and at least 8 other primate species.

== Rivers ==
The Lomela River flows in a northwest direction from the Sankuru Nature Reserve and across the Salonga National Park. The Busira River forms a few miles west of Boende where the Lomela River joins the Tshuapa River from the left. The Tshuapa rises in the southeast of the Sankuru Nature Reserve and meanders north-northwest and then west-northwest direction to its confluence with the Lomela River. The Lukenie River rises near Katako-Kombe to the south of the reserve.

== Issues ==
Satellite imagery shows that the reserve continues to steadily lose forest coverage. Between 2011 and 2018 it lost 136,000 hectares (340,000 acres) of primary rainforest, of which 70,800 hectares (175,000 acres) were lost between 2014 and 2019. The main driver for deforestation is growth of agriculture. Roads built to provide access to the logging area have let commercial hunters gain access to wildlife for sale as bushmeat in the large cities.

== See also ==
- Kokolopori Bonobo Reserve

== Sources ==
- Didace Pembele Bokiaga (6 November 2007), Arrêté ministériel n° 045/CAB/MIN/ECN-EF/03/PDB/07 du 06 novembre 2007 (PDF) (in French)
- "Relation: Lomela (2166127)", OpenStreetMap
- "Relation: Tshwapa (385008)", OpenStreetMap
- Sankuru Nature Reserve, Bonobo Conservation Initiative, 20 March 2019
- Volckhausen, Taran (24 October 2019), "Bonobo conservation stymied by deforestation, human rights abuses", Mongabay
