= Elinga-Mpango =

- Village
- Location within Democratic Republic of the Congo
- Coordinates: 1.9905°S 24.2213°E -->
- Country: Democratic Republic of the Congo
- Province: Sankuru
- Territory: Lomela Territory
- Collectivity: Djonga

Elinga-Mpango or Elingampango is a community in the Sankuru province of the Democratic Republic of the Congo.

== Location ==
Elinga-Mpango is in the Lomela Territory of Sankuru. It is on the right bank of the Tshuapa River. The Tshuapa has a navigable length of 825 kilometres (513 mi) from its confluence with the Lomela River up to the terminus at Elinga-Mpango. From Bondo to Elinga-Mpango the river narrows and winds, and is not navigable all year round. The Tshuapa has cataracts above Elingampango, preventing further navigation.

The village is in the Roman Catholic Diocese of Kole, and has a church dedicated to the Cœur Immaculé de Marie. The church was erected in 1956. It also has a health enter and dispensary.

== Sources ==
- Kibal N. Mansong'loo, Emery (2015), État du diocsese de Kole (PDF) (in French)
- Lederer, A. (1973), L'exploitation des affluents du Zaïre et des ports de l'intérieur de 1960 à 1971 (PDF) (in French), Académi e royal e des Sciences d'Outre-Mer: Classe des Sciences Techniques, N.S., XVII-6, Bruxelles
- "Node: Elinga-Mpango (1722905623)", OpenStreetMap
- Nouvelles, Diocese of Kole
