= Ikela =

- Location in Democratic Republic of the Congo
- Coordinates: 1°11′S 23°16′E
- Country: Democratic Republic of the Congo
- Province: Tshuapa

Population (2005)
  - Language: Lingala

Ikela is a market town in Tshuapa, Democratic Republic of Congo, lying on the Tshuapa River east of Boende. Founded by Belgium in the early twentieth century as a trading post, it became an important local centre. It is the headquarters of the Ikela Territory. Ikela is a locality and the administrative center of the territory in the Tshuapa province of the Democratic Republic of Congo. The territory of Ikela, a decentralized administrative unit within the Tshuapa province, covers a vast area of 22,565 km² and is home to over 294,129 inhabitants. It is composed of the Mongando, Boyela, Koka, Mongo, Topoke, and Watsi peoples, and is divided into five administrative sectors: Lokina, Loile, Lofome, Tshuapa, and Tumbenga. The dominant languages are Lingala and Lomongo, though several local dialects, such as Moko, Kitetela, Swahili, and Kikongo, are also spoken. The inhabitants, living in harmony with their environment, derive their livelihoods from the region's vast forests and rivers, notably the Lonkendu and Tshuapa. Agriculture, hunting, traditional fishing, and livestock farming form the pillars of the local economy, producing essential crops such as cassava, maize, plantain, rice, and peanuts, along with non-agricultural products like meat, fish, and wood. These activities ensure household survival and sustain small-scale local commerce.

The territory of Ikela has two health zones, Ikela and Mondombe, each equipped with a general reference hospital to provide medical care for the population. In terms of education, the region is served by two school districts, Ikela I and Ikela II, which oversee 216 primary schools and 113 secondary schools. Higher education is also present, with the Higher Institute of Medical Techniques (ISTM) and the University of Ikela. Politically, the territory enjoys representation at both local and national levels, with four deputies sitting in the provincial assembly and two in the national assembly, ensuring that the interests of Ikela's inhabitants are defended within the institutions of the Republic.

== History ==
The town was largely destroyed in the Second Congo War, being for many years under siege from Congolese Rally for Democracy forces. Its population of 15,000 almost all fled, but around half have since returned to reconstruct it.

Ikela is served by Ikela Airport.

Near the former front line, the town was largely destroyed during the Second Congo War (1998-2002) during the siege by forces of the Congolese Rally for Democracy (RCD). The population of approximately 15,000 people, who fled at the time, is currently rebuilding the town.

Ikela endured a siege lasting about a year, from 1998 to 1999, marking one of the darkest periods in its history. On a Sunday in January 1998, around 3 p.m., a violent attack was launched by a group of Rwandan and Ugandan rebels, affiliated with the Congolese Rally for Democracy (RCD). The attackers, heavily armed, appeared wearing the uniforms of the 227th brigade—a military unit also nicknamed "two two seven"—thus creating confusion among the local population and forces. In total chaos, the enemy, disguised as Congolese soldiers, infiltrated Ikela, blurring the lines and making it nearly impossible to distinguish between allies and adversaries. This infiltration, a symbol of military collapse and a crisis of trust, plunged the town into an atmosphere of disorientation and terror, further exacerbating the suffering of the inhabitants.

Despite the horror of the situation, the vigilance of the regular armed forces managed to offer crucial protection to the population and save the town from complete devastation. Bullets flew from all directions, causing an uncountable number of deaths, leaving behind desperate mothers abandoning their children, and men disoriented by the overwhelming power of the enemy's war machine. After being caught off guard by the rebels in the Itafa neighborhood, near the Sacred Heart, a group of women, children, and men was rescued thanks to the joint intervention of the Armed Forces of the Democratic Republic of Congo (FAC) at the time and the Zimbabwean army. These civilians were evacuated across the Tshuapa River and taken to the forest, not far from Bokole Sondjo. However, the threat remained, as the region was already heavily occupied by rebel forces, plunging these survivors into a new ordeal of uncertainty and terror, despite the heroic efforts made for their safety.

Near the village of Lingomo, an 11-year-old girl, Basele Lokwa Wenge Bibi, was separated from her family and found herself isolated among a group of displaced persons, trying to reach the other side of the Tshuapa. It is remembered that she had set out with Arthur Bofaya Lokwa Ekolo, who tragically perished during an attack. Devastated but resilient, young Basele, along with other survivors, continued their journey toward the village of Mandaka Ngelo. A week later, the group, now weakened, decided to turn back toward Bokole. It was there that circumstances took an unexpected turn: the group split, and, surprisingly, little Basele managed to cross the ferry in the company of military tanks taking position in the town of Ikela. This dramatic and unforeseen journey bears witness to the strength of spirit of a child confronted with the horrors of war and the resilience to survive the unimaginable.

Namibian soldier Mister Mingistro, an expert in handling anti-aircraft weapons, managed to reassure the population by repelling each devastating attack by the rebels along with his comrades. Under his command, the enemy was held off during each assault, but the cost was heavy. As the battles raged on, the ground became littered with corpses—soldiers, civilians, and rebels alike—victims of the relentless violence. Each victory, though decisive, left behind macabre scenes, bearing witness to the devastation of a war where no life seemed spared. Thanks to the courage and determination of Mingistro and his fellow soldiers, the fragile balance between protection and devastation was maintained, offering a glimmer of hope to a terrified population.

This war, more than just a conflict, resembled a veritable race toward extermination, as refugees from the Second Congo War (1998-2003), fleeing the massacres in Rutshuru, Ubundu, and Kisangani, desperately tried to reach Ikela. Those who had escaped the violence found themselves once again hunted, relentlessly pursued by ruthless rebel forces, supported by the Rwandan and Ugandan armies. A group of these refugees, believing they would find refuge by heading toward Boende, enjoyed only a brief respite: barely had they crossed the region when the rebels reappeared, once again spreading terror and death in their wake. This infernal cycle of flight and massacre left little hope for these civilians, whose survival was continuously threatened by the merciless brutality of this relentless war.

The army took care to build underground shelters to protect the population as the town was encircled, its inhabitants trapped in a deadly stranglehold. Faced with this desperate situation, the only chance for survival lay in hiding within these shelters, hastily constructed by the military forces. A total mobilization of the population was observed, with everyone participating in the effort to defend the town, uniting civilians and soldiers in the same cause. The people of Ikela, the Congolese armed forces, along with their Zimbabwean and Namibian allies, rallied around a single battle cry: "If Ikela must fall, it will be with the last drop of blood from those who swear never to surrender their freedom." This shared oath embodied the spirit of resistance in the face of an implacable threat and their determination to defend this inalienable freedom to the very end. Ikela, encircled and located in the heart of the DRC, remained the last strategic stronghold to open the way to Kinshasa from the north.

Food quickly ran out, plunging the town into an unprecedented famine. In response to this crisis, the regular army's command ingeniously supplied the armed forces and the besieged population by parachute, providing them with food and ammunition. For nearly a year, fierce fighting ensued between the regular army, supported by Zimbabwean and Namibian contingents, and the rebel forces of the Congolese Rally for Democracy. This survival strategy, combined with the resilience of the defenders, allowed them to maintain resistance against a relentless enemy, testifying to the determination of the loyalist forces not to give in, despite the isolation and grueling conditions.

The imminent arrival of the 504th battalion of the regular army, a unit made up of young university students who had abandoned their studies at the University of Kinshasa and elsewhere to defend the land of their ancestors from the invader, marked a decisive turning point. Initially deployed in the East before the fall of Kindu, this battalion was redirected 20 kilometers from Boende, where it repelled the rebels after intense fighting, achieving victories in Bokungu, Mondombe, Baloko, Bokende, Bongele, Yalusaka, Ya Kindu, Maboka, and other locations, after days and nights of uninterrupted battle. Despite heavy losses, the 504th battalion remained unwavering in morale, reaching the outskirts of the encirclement of Ikela on the eve of Christmas 1999. During the final confrontation at the entrance to the town, from December 22 to 24, 1999, soldier Mumberé, from the first section, was caught in an ambush near the Sacred Heart. Armed with his MAG and aware of the impending sacrifice, he bade farewell to his comrades and, in a heroic rush, launched a suicide attack, proclaiming that his spirit, rooted in this land, would survive beyond death. "Let them take this body, but my land will take my spirit," were his last words. By breaking the ambush and opening a breach, the 504th battalion finally entered Ikela, liberating the town and bringing an end to the rebel occupation.
