= Hysterangium bonobo =

Scientific classification
- Domain: Eukaryota
- Kingdom: Fungi
- Division: Basidiomycota
- Class: Agaricomycetes
- Order: Hysterangiales
- Family: Hysterangiaceae
- Genus: Hysterangium
- Species: H. bonobo

Binomial name
- Hysterangium bonobo Elliot et al. (2020)

Species of fungus

Hysterangium bonobo is a species of fungus found in the Democratic Republic of the Congo. Also known as simbokilo, the truffle-like species is named for bonobos, one of the species known to eat the fruiting bodies.

== Naming and taxonomy ==
In the Bantu language Bongando, Hysterangium bonobo is known as simbokilo, which is linked to a longer phrase that translates roughly as "don't let your brother-in-law leave because traps baited with this will bring in plenty of food".

Hysterangium bonobo was first described in the journal Mycologia in 2020 based on specimen gathered within the Kokolopori Bonobo Reserve in the Democratic Republic of the Congo. It is named for bonobos (Pan paniscus), a primate species known to unearth and consume the fruiting bodies. Primatologist Alexander Georgiev observed wild bonobos consuming the fungi in the reserve and collected samples for analysis.

== Description ==
The basidiocarp of Hysterangium bonobo is hypogeous to partially emergent, as wide as 50 mm. It is dull to light brown and irregularly globose. Its outer layer is lined with crystal-encrusted microscopic filaments which may play a role in aroma diffusion or defense. Analysis of Hysterangium bonobo indicated that the fungi had high concentrations of sodium.

== Use ==
Hysterangium bonobo is a food source for bonobos. The truffles are probably located through their scent, detected either in the air or on the hands of bonobos after digging through soil. A 2021 article in the American Journal of Primatology addressed the nutritional content of Hysterangium bonobo and bonobo feeding patterns. The research indicated that while the fungi were not a staple food source, they could be a supplemental source of sodium in the bonobo diet.

During forest hunting expeditions, some Congolese trappers use Hysterangium bonobo as bait for various small mammals.
