= Takayoshi Kano =

Japanese primatologist

Takayoshi Kano (加納 隆至, Kanō Takayoshi) is a Japanese primatologist, known for his pioneering work on the bonobo (Pan paniscus). He highlighted their peaceful communal lifestyle and the high frequency of sexual interactions. A student of Junichiro Itani, he was a professor at Ryukyu University and at the Primate Research Institute of Kyoto University. In 1973, he founded the first bonobo study center, at Wamba, Luo Reserve. It is the oldest bonobo research area and has survived a number of political upheavals in the region.

Initially in his career, he assisted Toshisada Nishida in his work on the chimpanzees of the Mahale mountains in Tanzania. In 1971, Nishida conducted a brief survey looking for the bonobo (or the "pygmy chimpanzee"), and encountered several abandoned chimpanzee nests. In the conclusion of his report, he suggests that:

"Before we can begin to make an intensive study, we must first make an extensive preliminary survey covering the vast area of the Central Congo Basin".

In 1973, Takayoshi Kano conducted this survey, covering a large area of several hundred kilometers on bicycle, when he visited a number of remote villages unaccustomed to non-Africans, some of which were hostile. He eventually came upon the village of Wamba, where the villagers were more welcoming, and he could hear bonobo calls from the forest. Unlike the area near Lake Tumba visited by Nishida, there was no tradition of hunting chimpanzees for bushmeat here. It took over a year of effort by Kano and his assistant, Suehisa Kuroda, before they could habituate the first group of bonobos in the area, provisioning them via a sugarcane patch. The chimpanzees in the area have little fear of humans, because of a local legend, that humans and bonobos were cousins.

"According to this belief, an older brother in a family of bonobos held to their traditional lifestyle and his descendants thus remained in the forest as bonobos. However, his younger brother was tired of eating raw foods. Once upon a time, he was roaming in the forest, crying, a spirit of the forest taught him to make fire, after which he left the forest and began eating cooked food. His descendants became humans. Therefore, the village people consider the bonobos akin to distant brothers and do not kill or eat them".

In the local language of the Bongando, one of the words for the bonobo is elia, or "missed" - the bonobos are thought to have "missed" becoming human, or have been "blocked" on this path.

Kano was among the first to comment extensively on the sexual practices among the bonobo, particularly the use of sex as a mechanism for reducing tensions within the group. Kano's work motivated a large group of researchers to work at Wamba, many of them from Kyoto and other institutions in Japan. He was among the movers in the founding of the Luo Scientific Reserve in 1990. The group was forced to pause its work several times - during the anti-Mobutu outbreak in 1991-92, and a major disruption after the Tutsi rebellion and war from 1996 to 2002.

Kano's main work, The Last Ape: Pygmy Chimpanzee Behavior and Ecology, was translated from Japanese into English in 1992.
