= Ruki River =

River in Democratic Republic of the Congo

- Mouth location in the Democratic Republic of the Congo

Location
- Country: Democratic Republic of the Congo

Physical characteristics
- Source
  - coordinates: 0.321419°S 18.982817°E
- Mouth: Congo River
  - coordinates: 0.079782°N 18.292829°E
- Length: 805 km (500 mi)
- Basin size: 173,790 km^{2} (67,100 mi^{2})
- Discharge
  - location: Ingende
  - average: 4,450 m^{3}/s (157,000 cu ft/s)

Basin features
- River system: Congo River
- Tributaries
  - left: Momboyo River
  - right: Busira River

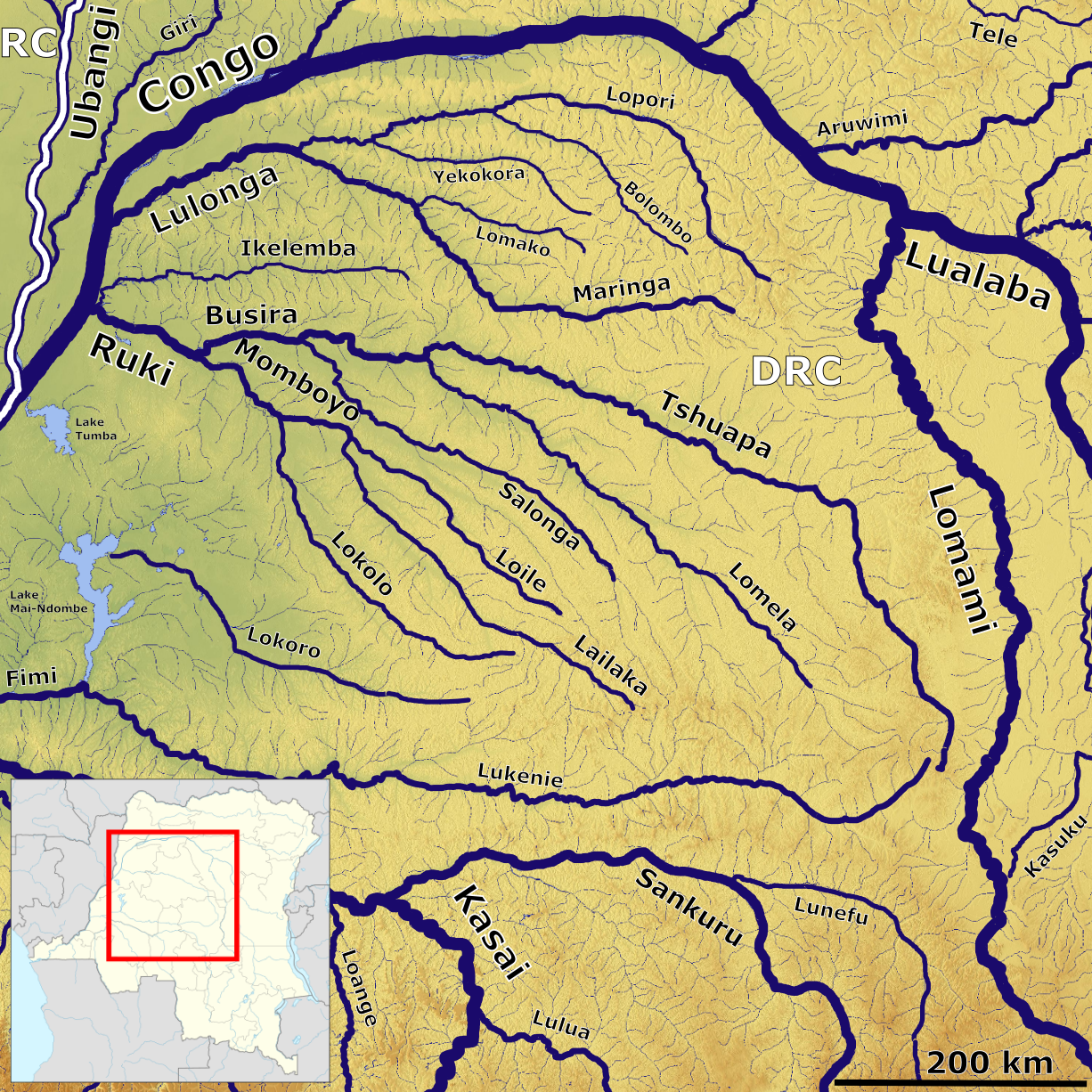
River Ruki as seen at the top left

The Ruki (Swahili: Mto Ruki) is a river in the Democratic Republic of the Congo. It is a left tributary of the Congo River. It may be seen as the lower reach of the Busira River, which in turn may be seen as the lower reach of the Tshuapa River.

== Location ==
The Ruki is a major river in the Cuvette Centrale of the middle Congo River basin. The watershed covers about 175,000 square kilometres (68,000 sq mi). The drainage basin is almost entirely pristine lowland forest and swamp forest. As of 2020, 248 species of fish had been identified in 26 families. The main rivers are the Ruki-Busira, Momboyo-Luilaka, Tshuapa, Lomela and Salonga. The most important town in the river basin is Boende on the Tshuapa, 29 kilometres (18 mi) upstream from where it joins the Lomela to form the Busira.

The Ruki River forms above Ingende where the Momboyo River joins the Busira River from the left and flows in a west-northwest direction. It enters the Congo from the east, flowing past the north of the town of Mbandaka. The Ruki and its main tributary the Busira can be navigated year round, since the depth is always more than 1 metre (3 ft 3 in) and reaches 2 metres (6 ft 7 in) in the flood period. High water is in March-April and November. Low water is in February and June-July.

The Ruki itself is just 103 kilometres (64 mi) long, and extends downstream from the mouth of the Momboyo, which is 2 kilometres (1.2 mi) above Ingende. Higher up it is called the Busira as far as the confluence of the Tshuapa and the Lomela. The Busira section is 305 kilometres (190 mi) long, and the whole Ruki-Busira waterway is 408 kilometres (254 mi) long. The Ruki-Busira receives four navigable tributaries: the Momboyo at 103 kilometres (64 mi) from its mouth, the Salonga at 233 kilometres (145 mi), just upstream from Lotoko, and the Tshuapa and Lomela which converge to form the river.

== Colonial period ==
The explorer Henry Morton Stanley visited the region, and called the Ruki the Mohindu River. A local man from Bungata named the river Buruki (Ruki) or Mohindu, meaning "Black". Stanley explored it for about 80 miles (130 km), and based on its size and reports of the local people he estimated that it might be navigable for about 650 miles (1,050 km).

== The African Queen ==
The Ruki River was used as a location for the movie The African Queen starring Humphrey Bogart and Katharine Hepburn. A 1951 article in Life magazine describes how the influx of filmmakers broke the "sweltering monotony of life along the dank, disease-ridden shores" of the river. Forest was cleared to create a "cluster of tasteful native huts". Filming took seven weeks.

== Sources ==
- Drake, Travis W.; Baumgartner, Simon; Barthel, Matti; Bauters, Marijn; Van Oost, Kristof; Bush, Glenn, Hydrologic and Biogeochemical Fluxes from the Ruki River and Adjacent Swamp Forest
- "Katie and Bogie Hit the Congo", Life, 17 September 1951
- Kesner-Reyes, Kathleen (2020), "EcosystemRuki", fishbase
- Lederer, A. (1973), L'exploitation des affluents du Zaïre et des ports de l'intérieur de 1960 à 1971 (PDF) (in French), Académi e royal e des Sciences d'Outre-Mer: Classe des Sciences Techniques, N.S., XVII-6, Bruxelles
- "Ruki River", Encyclopaedia Britannica
- Stanley, Henry Morton (1885), The Congo and the Founding of Its Free State: A Story of Work and Exploration, Cambridge University Press, ISBN 978-1-108-03132-5
- "Way: Моандака (238294439)", OpenStreetMap
