= Lomela River =

River in Democratic Republic of the Congo

- Mouth location in the Democratic Republic of the Congo

Location
- Country: Democratic Republic of the Congo

Physical characteristics
- Mouth: Busira River
  - coordinates: 0.3497°S 20.7804°E
- Length: 566 kilometres (352 mi) (navigable)

Basin features
- River system: Ruki–Busira

The Lomela River is a river in the Democratic Republic of the Congo. It is one of the main tributaries of the Busira River, which forms where the Lomela meets the Tshuapa River. The Busira is in turn the main tributary of the Ruki River, which enters the Congo River to the north of Mbandaka.

== Location ==
The Lomela River flows in a northwest direction from the Sankuru Nature Reserve and across the Salonga National Park. The Busira River forms a few miles west of Boende where the Lomela River joins the Tshuapa River from the left.

== Navigation ==
The Lomela River is navigable from its confluence with the Tshuapa up to the terminus of Lomela, a distance of 566 kilometres (352 mi). It is winding and narrow, and flows through forested and marshy areas that flood in the high water seasons. From the mouth of the river to Itoko, a distance of 236 kilometres (147 mi), it always allows boats with a 1 metre (3 ft 3 in) draft. In high water periods it can take 350 ton barges, and in low water periods can take 150-250 ton barges in this section. From Itoko to Lomami, at 462 kilometres (287 mi) from its mouth, the rocky banks and narrow navigable channels make navigation dangerous. From Lomami up to Lomela the river is open to navigation only from early June to early September, and only for 25 ton barges. In some places the channels are less than 25 metres (82 ft) wide and 0.5 metres (1 ft 8 in) deep.

== Environment ==
The Lomela flows through the heart of the central depression of the Congo Basin. Rainfall here averages 2,000 millimetres (79 in) annually, with no dry season. The Lomela meanders through a 88,000 hectares (220,000 acres) area of permanent swamp forest from 20°35'E to 21°30'E, and through a 46,500 hectares (115,000 acres) area of swamp forest between 21°50'E and 22°18'E. Part of the river is protected by the Salonga National Park.

== Sources ==
- Hughes, R. H. (1992), A Directory of African Wetlands, IUCN, ISBN 978-2-88032-949-5
- Lederer, A. (1973), L'exploitation des affluents du Zaïre et des ports de l'intérieur de 1960 à 1971 (PDF) (in French), Académi e royal e des Sciences d'Outre-Mer: Classe des Sciences Techniques, N.S., XVII-6, Bruxelles
- "Relation: Lomela (2166127)", OpenStreetMap
