= Boende Airport =

Boende Airport Aéroport de Boende
- IATA: BNB; ICAO: FZGN

Summary
- Serves: Boende, Democratic Republic of the Congo
- Elevation AMSL: 1,168 ft / 356 m
- Coordinates: 0°17′12″S 20°53′00″E

Map
- Location of airport in the Democratic Republic of the Congo

Runways
| Direction | Length | | Surface |
| Direction | m | ft | Surface |
|---|---|---|---|
| 07/25 | 1,400 | 4,593 | Gravel |
- Sources: GCM Google Maps

Boende Airport (IATA: BNB, ICAO: FZGN) (French: Aéroport de Boende) is an airport serving the town of Boende in Tshuapa Province, Democratic Republic of the Congo.

The Boende non-directional beacon (Ident: 'BDE) is located 2.3 nautical miles (4.3 km) west-southwest of the airport.

== Airlines and destinations ==
| Airlines | Destinations |
|---|---|
| Compagnie Africaine d'Aviation | Kinshasa–N'djili, Mbandaka |

== See also ==
- List of airports in the Democratic Republic of the Congo
- Transport in the Democratic Republic of the Congo
