= Clathrogaster =

Scientific classification
- Kingdom: Fungi
- Division: Basidiomycota
- Class: Agaricomycetes
- Order: Hysterangiales
- Family: Hysterangiaceae
- Genus: Clathrogaster; Petri (1900)

Species
- C. beccarii C. vulvarius

Genus of fungi

Clathrogaster is a genus of fungi in the Hysterangiaceae family. Circumscribed by Lionello Petri in 1900, The genus contains two species found in Borneo.
