= Circulocolumella =

Scientific classification
- Kingdom: Fungi
- Division: Basidiomycota
- Class: Agaricomycetes
- Order: Hysterangiales
- Family: Hysterangiaceae
- Genus: circulocolumella S.Ito & S.Imai (1957)

Type species
- Circulocolumella hahashimensis (S.Ito & S.Imai) S.Ito & S.Imai (1957)

Synonyms
- Genus: Stalactocolumella S.Imai (1950); Species: Hysterangium hahashimense S.Ito & S.Imai (1937); Gelopellis hahashimensis (S.Ito & S.Imai) Zeller (1947)

Genus of fungi

Circulocolumella is a genus of fungus in the Hysterangiaceae family. The genus is monotypic, containing the single species Circulocolumella hahashimensis, found in the Bonin Islands of Japan, and is now extinct.
