= Ikela Airport =

- IATA: IKL; ICAO: FZGV

Summary
- Serves: Ikela, Democratic Republic of the Congo
- Elevation AMSL: 1,283 ft / 391 m
- Coordinates: 1°02′55″S 23°22′20″E

Map
- Location of airport in the Democratic Republic of the Congo

Runways
| Direction | Length | | Surface |
| Direction | m | ft | Surface |
|---|---|---|---|
| 07/25 | 1,180 | 3,871 | Dirt |
- Source: GCM Google Maps

Ikela Airport (IATA: IKL, ICAO: FZGV) is an airport serving the market town of Ikela in Tshuapa Province, Democratic Republic of the Congo.

== See also ==
- Transport in the Democratic Republic of the Congo
- List of airports in the Democratic Republic of the Congo
