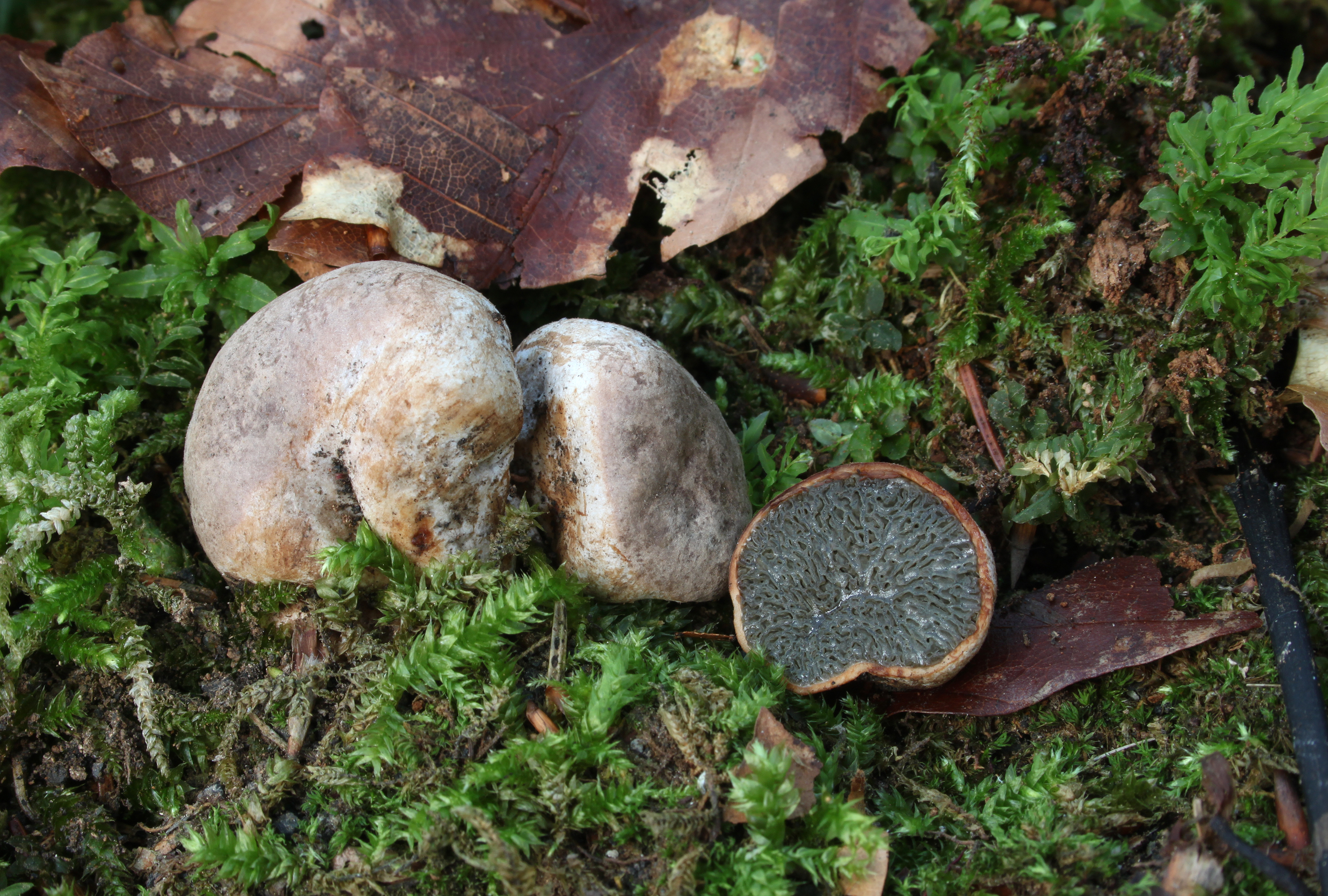
- Hysterangium stoloniferum

Scientific classification
- Domain: Eukaryota
- Kingdom: Fungi
- Division: Basidiomycota
- Class: Agaricomycetes
- Order: Hysterangiales
- Family: Hysterangiaceae
- Genus: Hysterangium; Vittad. (1831)

Type species
- Hysterangium clathroides Vittad. (1831)

= Hysterangium =

Genus of fungi

Hysterangium is a genus of truffle-like fungi in the family Hysterangiaceae. The genus is widespread, especially in temperate regions, and contains more than 60 species. Hysterangium was circumscribed by Italian mycologist Carlo Vittadini in 1831.

== Species ==
As of June 2015, Index Fungorum lists 64 valid species of Hysterangium:

- Hysterangium affine
- Hysterangium aggregatum
- Hysterangium album
- Hysterangium areolatum
- Hysterangium aureum
- Hysterangium calcareum R. Hesse 1891
- Hysterangium cerebrinum
- Hysterangium cinereum
- Hysterangium clathroides
- Hysterangium coriaceum
- Hysterangium crassirhachis
- Hysterangium crassum
- Hysterangium duriaeanum
- Hysterangium epiroticum
- Hysterangium eucalyptorum
- Hysterangium fischeri
- Hysterangium fragile
- Hysterangium fuscum
- Hysterangium gardneri
- Hysterangium graveolens
- Hysterangium hallingii
- Hysterangium harknessii
- Hysterangium hessei Soehner ex Svrček 1958
- Hysterangium hokkaidoense
- Hysterangium incarceratum
- Hysterangium incognitum
- Hysterangium inflatum
- Hysterangium knappii
- Hysterangium latiappendiculatum
- Hysterangium latisporum
- Hysterangium lobatum
- Hysterangium luteum
- Hysterangium maidenii
- Hysterangium membranaceum
- Hysterangium moselei
- Hysterangium neglectum
- Hysterangium neocaledonicum
- Hysterangium neotunicatum
- Hysterangium nephriticum Berk. 1844
- Hysterangium nigrum
- Hysterangium obtusum
- Hysterangium occidentale
- Hysterangium petriei
- Hysterangium pompholyx Tul. & C. Tul. 1843
- Hysterangium pseudacaciae
- Hysterangium pseudostoloniferum
- Hysterangium pterosporum
- Hysterangium pumilum
- Hysterangium quercicola
- Hysterangium rickenii
- Hysterangium rubricatum
- Hysterangium rugisporum
- Hysterangium rupticutis
- Hysterangium salmonaceum
- Hysterangium separabile Zeller 1941
- Hysterangium siculum
- Hysterangium simlense
- Hysterangium spegazzinii
- Hysterangium stoloniferum Tul. & C. Tul. 1851
- Hysterangium strobilus
- Hysterangium subglobosum
- Hysterangium thwaitesii
- Hysterangium velatisporum
- Hysterangium youngii

Another list can be found in Catalogue of Life, which also lists Hysterangium atratum Rodway 1920 , Hysterangium burburianum Rodway 1918, and others.

A further species, Hysterangium bonobo, has been reported by Elliott et al. in September 2020.

== Gallery ==
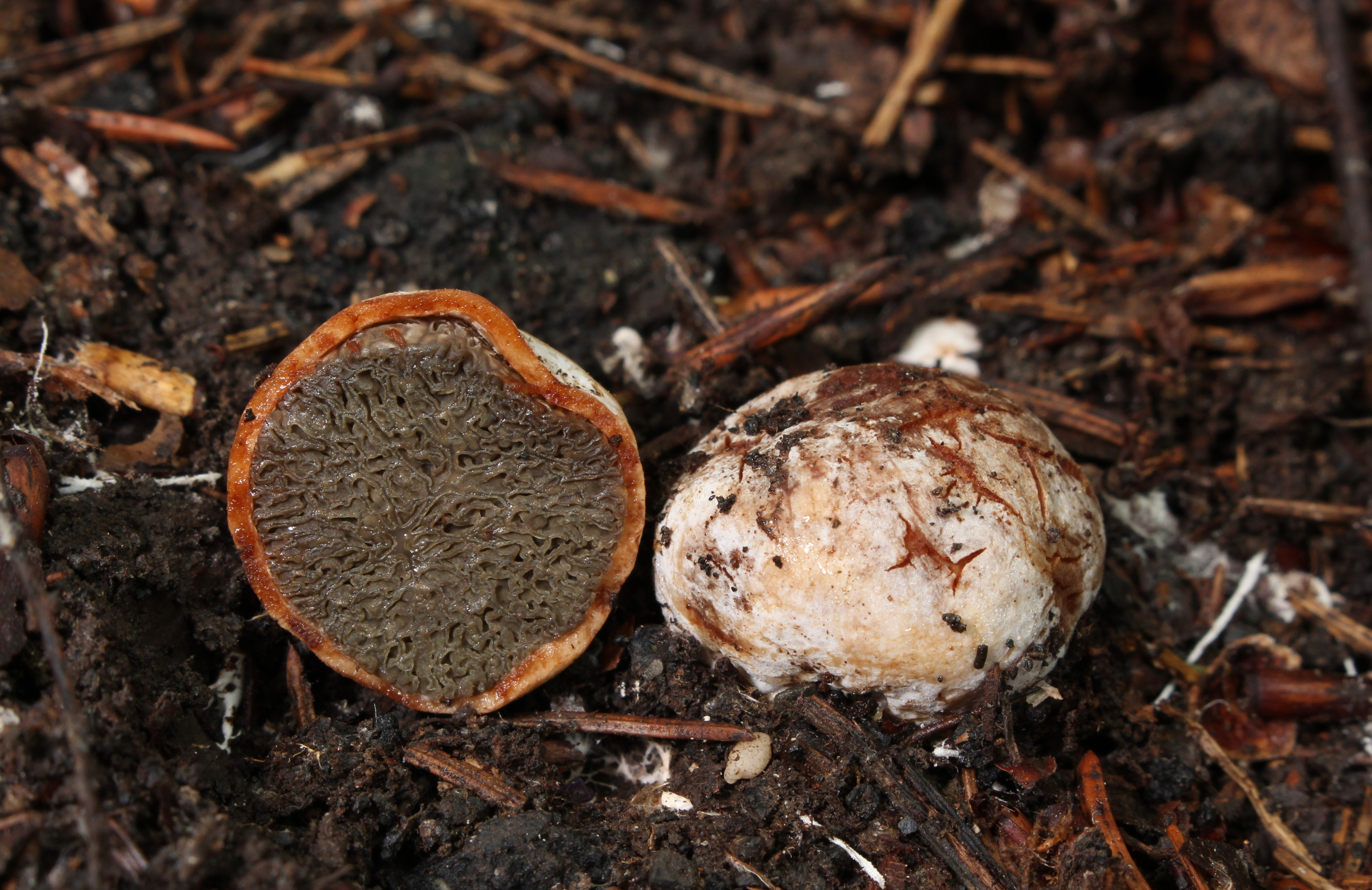
Hysterangium stoloniferum

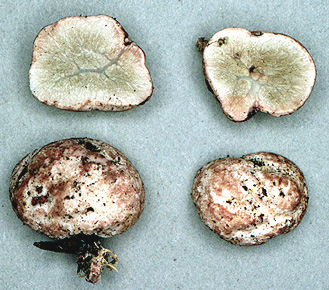
Hysterangium coriaceum
