= Boninogaster =

Scientific classification
- Kingdom: Fungi
- Division: Basidiomycota
- Class: Agaricomycetes
- Order: Hysterangiales
- Family: Hysterangiaceae
- Genus: Boninogaster; Kobayasi (1937)

Type species
- Boninogaster phalloides Kobayasi (1937)

Genus of fungi

Boninogaster is a genus of fungus in the Hysterangiaceae family. The genus is monotypic, containing the single species Boninogaster phalloides, found in the Bonin Islands of Japan. The genus and species were described by Japanese mycologist Yosio Kobayasi in 1937.
