= Ikela Territory =

- Interactive map of Ikela Territory
- Coordinates: 1°11′S 23°16′E
- Country: DR Congo
- Province: Tshuapa

Population (2005)
  - Languages: Lingala
- Time zone: UTC+1 (WAT)

Ikela Territory an administrative division of Tshuapa Province of the Democratic Republic of the Congo. The headquarters of the Territory is the town of Ikela. The territory is divided into Loile Sector, Lofome Sector, Lokina Sector, Tumbenga Sector and Tshuapa Sector.

== History ==
The town was largely destroyed during the Second Congo War (1998-2002) during the siege by forces of the Congolese Rally for Democracy. The population of about 15,000, which fled at the time, is now rebuilding the town.

Ikela experienced a siege that lasted about a year, from 1998 to 1999. In January 1998, a group of Rwandan and Ugandan rebels affiliated with the Congolese Rally for Democracy (RCD) attacked the town. The armed rebels wore Congolese army uniforms when they infiltrated Ikela, making it difficult to distinguish between allies and enemies, leading to significant disruption and hardship for the town's residents.

The regular armed forces provided protection to the population during the siege. There were numerous casualties. In the Itafa district, near Sacré-Cœur, a group of women, children, and men were rescued through a joint intervention by the Armed Forces of the Democratic Republic of Congo (FAC) and the Zimbabwean army. These civilians were evacuated across the Tshuapa River and into the forest near Bokole Sondjo. The region remained contested, and the survivors continued to face considerable danger.

During the Second Congo War (1998–2003), refugees fleeing violence in Rutshuru, Ubundu, and Kisangani tried to reach Ikela. Many of those who escaped continued to face attacks from rebel forces, which were supported by Rwandan and Ugandan armies. Some refugees traveled toward Boende, but the region remained unstable and subject to repeated violence. The conflict posed ongoing risks to civilians throughout the area.

The army constructed underground shelters to protect the population as Ikela became encircled. Many residents took refuge in these shelters, and both civilians and soldiers participated in the town's defense. Congolese forces, along with Zimbabwean and Namibian allies, regarded Ikela as a strategic position on the approach to Kinshasa from the north.

Food supplies were depleted, which led to a famine. In response, the regular army's headquarters arranged air-drops of food and ammunition for both the armed forces and the besieged population. For almost a year, the regular army, with support from Zimbabwean and Namibian contingents, fought against the Congolese Rally for Democracy rebel forces.

The arrival of the 504th battalion of the regular army, made up of former university students, marked a significant change in the conflict. After being redeployed from the East, the battalion fought in several towns and villages before reaching the outskirts of Ikela in December 1999. The battalion faced heavy losses but continued its advance.. The battalion broke through the ambush, entered Ikela, and ended the rebel occupation of the town.
