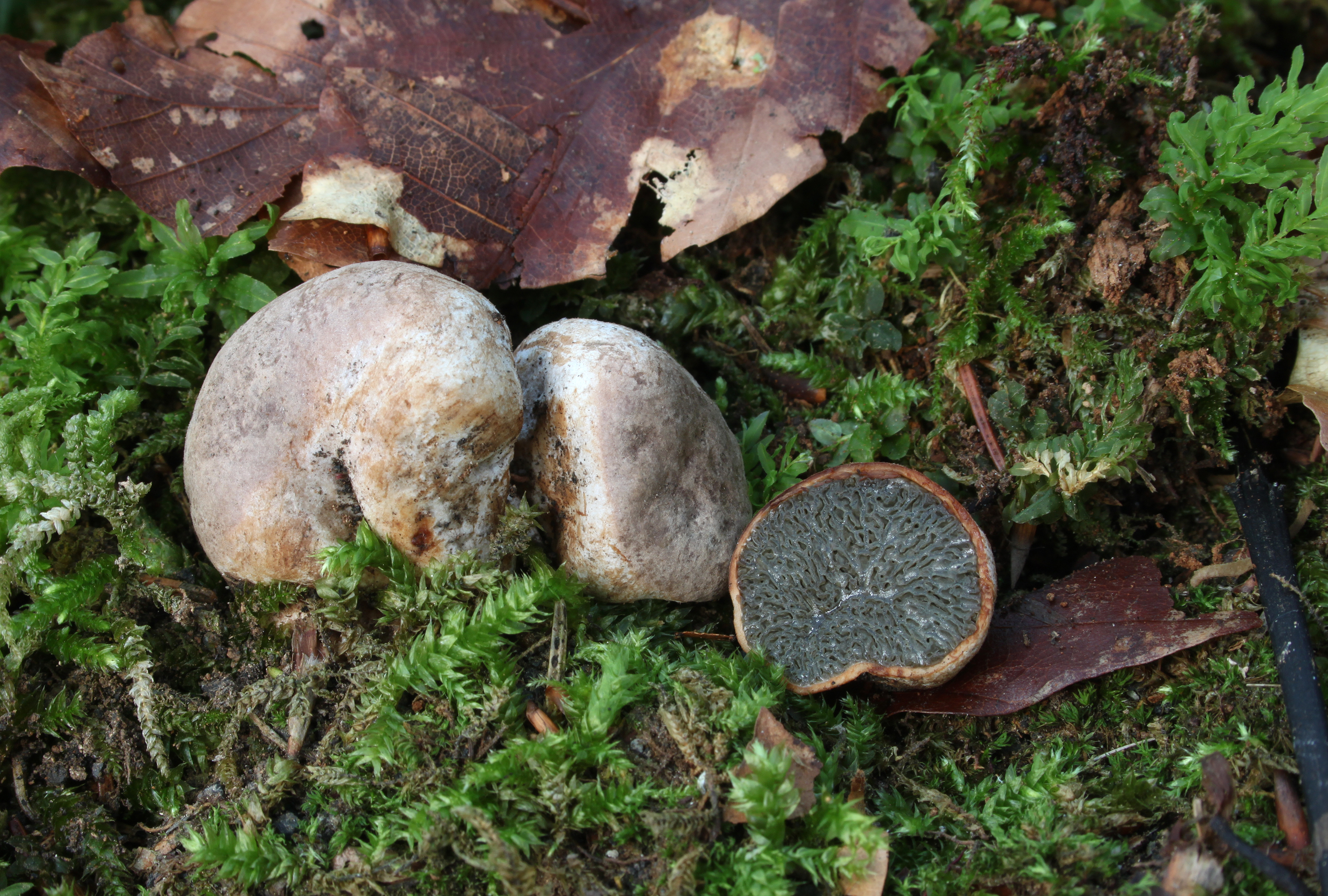
- Hysterangium stoloniferum

Scientific classification
- Kingdom: Fungi
- Division: Basidiomycota
- Class: Agaricomycetes
- Order: Hysterangiales
- Family: Hysterangiaceae; E.Fisch. (1899)

Type genus
- Hysterangium Vittad. (1831)

Genera
- Aroramyces; Boninogaster; Circulocolumella; Clathrogaster; Hysterangium

= Hysterangiaceae =

Family of fungi

The Hysterangiaceae are a family of fungi in the order Hysterangiales. Species in the family are widely distributed in temperate areas and the tropics. According to a 2008 estimate, the family contains four genera and 54 species.
