= Tshuapa River =

River in Democratic Republic of the Congo

- The Ruki-Busira-Tshuapa River, in red

- Mouth location in the Democratic Republic of the Congo

Location
- Country: Democratic Republic of the Congo

Physical characteristics
- Mouth: Busira River
  - coordinates: 0.345888°S 20.783018°E
- Length: 825 kilometres (513 mi) (navigable)

Basin features
- River system: Ruki–Busira

The Tshuapa River or Rivière Tshwapa is a river in Democratic Republic of the Congo, the main tributary of the Busira River.

== Course ==
The river rises in the south of the Sankuru Nature Reserve and meanders north-northwest to Elinga-Mpango and on to Bondo, from where flows in a west-northwest direction to Boende, above its confluence with the Lomela River to form the Busira River. It is 408 kilometres (254 mi) from this point to the Congo River. The town of Boende is 29 kilometres (18 mi) from the confluence and 444 kilometres (276 mi) from Mbandaka. on the Congo River.

== Environment ==
The confluence of the Tshuapa and Lomela rivers is in the heart of the central depression of the Congo Basin. Annual rainfall averages 2,000 millimetres (79 in), with no dry season. Throughout parts of the Tshuapa catchment 20–25% of the land is subject to flooding. Permanent swamp forest stretches for 156 kilometres (97 mi) along the Tshuapa, with an area of 160,000 hectares (400,000 acres) between 20°33'E and 22°00'E.

== Navigation ==
The Tshuapa has a navigable length of 825 kilometres (513 mi) from its confluence with the Lomela up to the terminus at Elinga-Mpango. The section of the river from its mouth up to Ikela, at 555 kilometres (345 mi) can be navigated all year round by 350 ton barges, although a few tight bends must be negotiated. From Ikela up to Bondo at 696 kilometres (432 mi) it can carry 40 ton barges all year round. There is a rocky bench 3 kilometres (1.9 mi) upstream from Bondo. From Bondo to Elinga-Mpango the river narrows and winds more, and is not navigable all year round.

== Sources ==
- Hughes, R. H. (1992), A Directory of African Wetlands, IUCN, ISBN 978-2-88032-949-5
- Lederer, A. (1973), L'exploitation des affluents du Zaïre et des ports de l'intérieur de 1960 à 1971 (PDF) (in French), Académi e royal e des Sciences d'Outre-Mer: Classe des Sciences Techniques, N.S., XVII-6, Bruxelles
- "Relation: Tshwapa (385008)", OpenStreetMap
