= Luo Scientific Reserve =

Protected area in the Democratic Republic of the Congo

- Location within Democratic Republic of the Congo
- Location: Ikela Territory (Tshuapa), DR Congo
- Coordinates: 0°08′N 22°34′E
- Established: 1990

The Luo Scientific Reserve (French: Réserve Scientifique de Luo) is a protected area situated in the Ikela territory of Tshuapa province, Democratic Republic of the Congo. The reserve covers 225.59 km^{2} (55,740 acres; 87.10 sq mi).

The reserve is in the territory of the Bongando people. A Japanese team first started researching the bonobo population near the village of Wamba in 1973, and the Luo Scientific Reserve was established in 1990. However, research was discontinued after political disorders started in 1991 followed by civil war in 1997, resuming only in the mid-2000s.
