= Bonobo Conservation Initiative =

- Headquarters: Washington, D.C.
- Region served: Democratic Republic of the Congo
- Website: www.bonobo.org

The Bonobo Conservation Initiative is a non-profit organization based in Washington, D.C. and the Democratic Republic of the Congo that promotes conservation of the bonobo and its habitat in the tropical forests of the Congo Basin.

Under the Bonobo Conservation Initiative, a reforestation project is planned for the Maringa-Lopori-Wamba Landscape around the Luo Scientific Reserve in an attempt to counter the destruction of bonobo habitat and increase areas where the bonobo are protected. 5,000 hectares (12,000 acres) will be replanted, forming corridors to link existing patches of forest, with the project funded by sale of carbon credits.
