= Djolu Territory =

Djolu
- Territory
- Interactive map of Djolu
- Coordinates: 0°42′N 22°25′E
- Country: DR Congo
- Province: Tshuapa

Area
  - Total: 17,494 km^{2} (6,754 sq mi)

Population
  - Total: 483,545
  - Density: 27.641/km^{2} (71.589/sq mi)
- Time zone: UTC+1 (WAT)

Djolu is a territory of the Democratic Republic of the Congo. It is located in Tshuapa Province.
