= Boende =

- Provincial capital and city
- Ville de Boende
- Location in Democratic Republic of the Congo
- Coordinates: 0.281°S 20.876°E
- Country: DR Congo
- Province: Tshuapa
- Communes: Boende, Tshuapa

Government
  - Mayor: Mustafa Bosenge

Population (2009)
  - Total: 36,158
- Time zone: UTC+1 (West Africa Time)
- Climate: Af

Boende is a city and capital of Tshuapa Province, lying on the Tshuapa River, in the Democratic Republic of Congo. It is a river port with riverboats sailing to Kinshasa via Mbandaka and is also home to an airport. As of 2009, it had an estimated population of 36,158. The national language used locally is Lingala.

== History ==
Boende was captured by mercenaries during the Simba rebellion in January 1964. This battle was documented in the Mondo documentary Africa Addio.

== Climate ==
Boende has an equatorial tropical rainforest climate (Köppen Af) and is hot, humid and wet all year round without pronounced variations in temperature or rainfall.

Climate data for Boende, elevation 351 m (1,152 ft), (1971–2000)
Month	Jan	Feb	Mar	Apr	May	Jun	Jul	Aug	Sep	Oct	Nov	Dec	Year
Mean daily maximum °C (°F)	30.6 (87.1)	31.4 (88.5)	31.2 (88.2)	31.1 (88.0)	31.2 (88.2)	30.3 (86.5)	29.1 (84.4)	29.4 (84.9)	30.0 (86.0)	30.0 (86.0)	30.0 (86.0)	30.2 (86.4)	30.4 (86.7)
Mean daily minimum °C (°F)	20.3 (68.5)	20.5 (68.9)	20.7 (69.3)	20.9 (69.6)	20.8 (69.4)	20.5 (68.9)	20.2 (68.4)	20.2 (68.4)	20.3 (68.5)	20.4 (68.7)	20.5 (68.9)	20.6 (69.1)	20.5 (68.9)
Average precipitation mm (inches)	156.0 (6.14)	136.0 (5.35)	203.0 (7.99)	174.0 (6.85)	168.0 (6.61)	137.0 (5.39)	128.0 (5.04)	182.0 (7.17)	188.0 (7.40)	215.0 (8.46)	224.0 (8.82)	155.0 (6.10)	2,066 (81.32)
Average relative humidity (%)	85	83	83	85	85	87	89	86	88	86	86	86	86
Source: FAO
