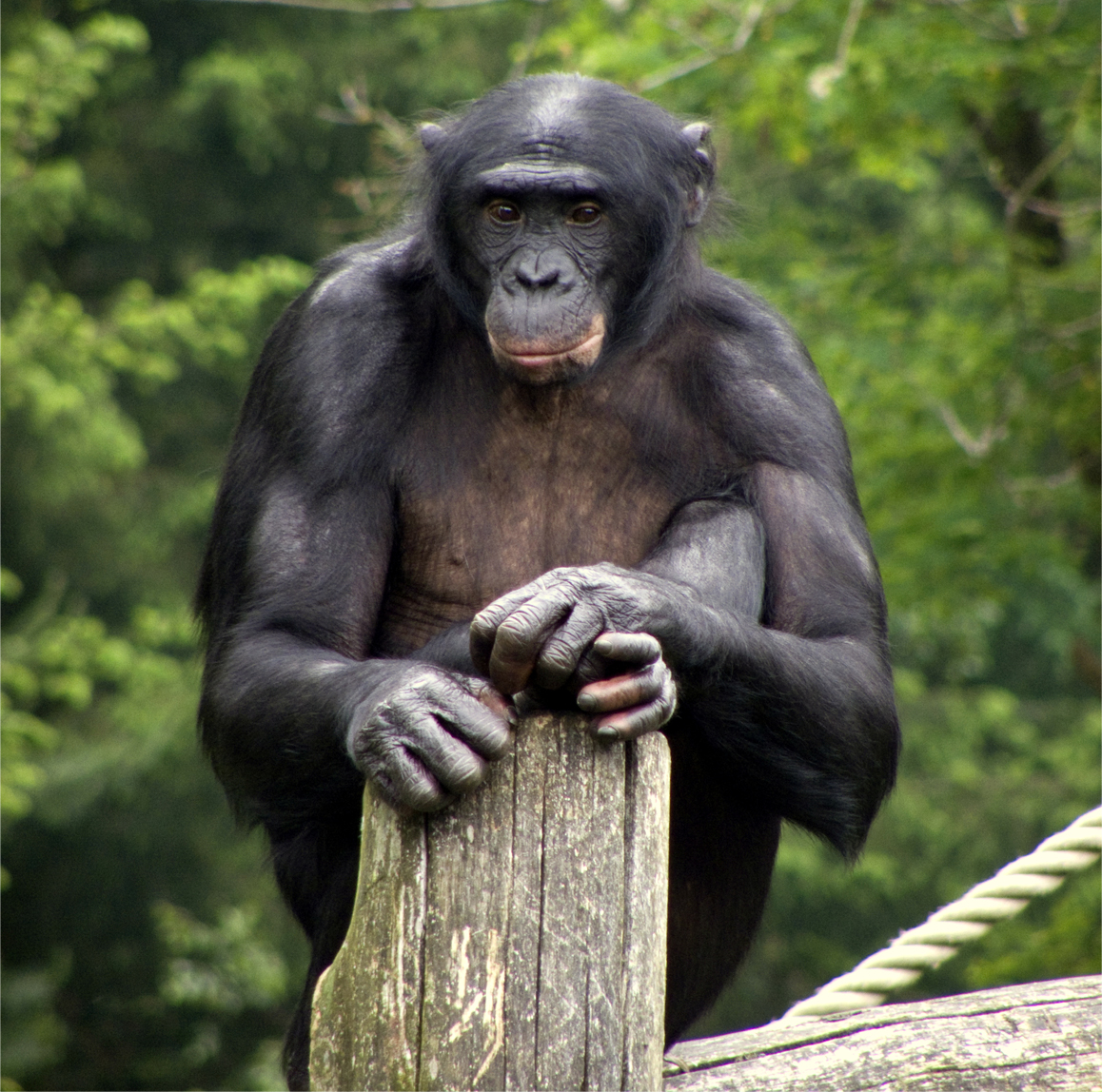
- Male at Apenheul Primate Park

Conservation status
- Endangered (IUCN 3.1)
- CITES Appendix I

Scientific classification
- Kingdom: Animalia
- Phylum: Chordata
- Class: Mammalia
- Order: Primates
- Superfamily: Hominoidea
- Family: Hominidae
- Genus: Pan
- Species: P. paniscus

Binomial name
- Pan paniscus Schwarz, 1929
- Bonobo distribution

= Bonobo =

Bonobo Temporal range: 1.5–0 Ma Early Pleistocene – Holocene

Species of great ape

The bonobo (/bəˈnoʊboʊ, ˈbɒnəboʊ/; Pan paniscus), also historically called the pygmy chimpanzee, is the smallest species of great ape and one of the two making up the genus Pan (the other being the chimpanzee, Pan troglodytes). While bonobos are today recognized as a distinct species, they were initially thought to be a subspecies of Pan troglodytes, because of the physical similarities between the two species. Taxonomically, members of the chimpanzee/bonobo subtribe Panina—composed entirely by the genus Pan—are collectively termed panins.

Bonobos are distinguished from common chimpanzees by relatively long limbs, pinker lips, a darker face, a tail-tuft through adulthood, and longer, parted hair on their heads. Some individuals have sparser, thin hair over parts of their bodies. Bonobos typically live 40 years in captivity; their lifespan in the wild is unknown, but it is almost certainly much shorter. The bonobo is found in a 500,000 km^{2} (190,000 sq mi) area within the Congo Basin of the Democratic Republic of the Congo (DRC), Central Africa. It is predominantly frugivorous, compared to the often highly omnivorous diets and hunting of small monkeys, duiker and other antelope exhibited by common chimpanzees. Bonobos inhabit primary and secondary forest, including seasonally inundated swamp forest. Because of political instability in the region, and the general timidity of bonobos, there has been relatively little field work done observing the species in its natural habitat.

Along with the common chimpanzee, the bonobo is the closest extant relative to humans. As the two species are not proficient swimmers, the natural formation of the Congo River (around 1.5–2 million years ago) possibly led to the isolation and speciation of the bonobo. Bonobos live south of the river, and thereby were separated from the ancestors of the common chimpanzee, which live north of the river. There are no concrete figures regarding population, but the estimate is between 29,500 and 50,000 individuals. The species is listed as Endangered on the IUCN Red List and is most threatened by habitat destruction, human population growth and movement (as well as ongoing civil unrest and political infighting), with commercial poaching being, by far, the most prominent threat.

== Etymology ==
Formerly the bonobo was known as the "pygmy chimpanzee", despite the bonobo having a similar body size to the common chimpanzee. The name "pygmy" was given by the German zoologist Ernst Schwarz in 1929, who classified the species on the basis of a previously mislabeled bonobo cranium, noting its diminutive size compared to chimpanzee skulls.

The name "bonobo" first appeared in 1954, when Austrian zoologist Eduard Paul Tratz and German biologist Heinz Heck proposed it as a new and separate generic term for pygmy chimpanzees. The name is thought to derive from a misspelling on a shipping crate from the town of Bolobo on the Congo River near the location from which the first bonobo specimens were collected in the 1920s.

In English the word is generally stressed on the second syllable, in both the US and UK, though sometimes it is instead stressed on the first syllable.

== Taxonomy ==
The bonobo was first recognised as a distinct taxon in 1928 by German anatomist Ernst Schwarz, based on a skull in the Tervuren Museum in Belgium which had previously been classified as a juvenile chimpanzee (Pan troglodytes). Schwarz published his findings in 1929, classifying the bonobo as a subspecies of chimpanzee, Pan satyrus paniscus. In 1933, American anatomist Harold Coolidge elevated it to species status. Major behavioural differences between bonobos and chimpanzees were first discussed in detail by Tratz and Heck in the early 1950s. Unaware of any taxonomic distinction with the common chimpanzee, American psychologist and primatologist Robert Yerkes had already noticed an unexpected major behavioural difference in the 1920s.

Bonobos and chimpanzees are the two species which make up the genus Pan, and are the closest living relatives to humans (Homo sapiens).

Bonobos and common chimpanzees show remarkable evolutionary stasis in musculoskeletal anatomy since their split from humans 8 million years ago, with bonobos exhibiting no changes since diverging from common chimps ~2 million years ago, making them a better anatomical model for the last common ancestor of humans and chimps/bonobos.

Nonetheless, the exact timing of the Pan–Homo last common ancestor is contentious, but DNA comparison suggests continual interbreeding between ancestral Pan and Homo groups, post-divergence, until about 4 million years ago. DNA evidence suggests the bonobo and common chimpanzee species diverged approximately 890,000–860,000 years ago following separation of these two populations possibly because of acidification and the spread of savannas at this time. Currently, these two species are separated by the Congo River, which had existed well before the divergence date, though ancestral Pan may have dispersed across the river using corridors which no longer exist. The first Pan fossils were reported in 2005 from the Middle Pleistocene (after the bonobo–chimpanzee split) of Kenya, alongside early Homo fossils.

According to A. Zihlman, bonobo body proportions closely resemble those of Australopithecus, leading evolutionary biologist Jeremy Griffith to suggest that bonobos may be a living example of our distant human ancestors. According to Australian anthropologists Gary Clark and Maciej Henneberg, human ancestors went through a bonobo-like phase featuring reduced aggression and associated anatomical changes, exemplified in Ardipithecus ramidus.

The first official publication of the sequencing and assembly of the bonobo genome was released in June 2012. The genome of a female bonobo from Leipzig Zoo was deposited with the International Nucleotide Sequence Database Collaboration (DDBJ/EMBL/GenBank) under the EMBL accession number AJFE01000000 after a previous analysis by the National Human Genome Research Institute confirmed that the bonobo genome is about 0.4% divergent from the chimpanzee genome.

=== Genetics and genomics ===
Genomic information
- NCBI ID: GCF_029289425.2
- Ploidy: diploid
- Genome size: 2,869.21 Mb
- Number of chromosomes: 24 pairs
- Year of completion: 2012, 2021
- UCSC Genome Browser assembly ID: panPan3

Relationships of bonobos to humans and other apes can be determined by comparing their genes or whole genomes. While the first bonobo genome was published in 2012, a high-quality reference genome became available only in 2021. The overall nucleotide divergence between chimpanzee and bonobo based on the latter is 0.421 ± 0.086% for autosomes and 0.311 ± 0.060% for the X chromosome. The reference genome predicts 22,366 full-length protein-coding genes and 9,066 noncoding genes, although cDNA sequencing confirmed only 20,478 protein-coding and 36,880 noncoding bonobo genes, similar to the number of genes annotated in the human genome. Overall, 206 and 1,576 protein-coding genes are part of gene families that contracted or expanded in the bonobo genome compared to the human genome, respectively, that is, these genes were lost or gained in the bonobo genome compared to humans.

=== Hybrids ===
Researchers have found that both central (Pan troglodytes troglodytes) and eastern chimpanzees (Pan troglodytes schweinfurthii) share more genetic material with bonobos than other chimpanzee subspecies. It is believed that genetic admixture has occurred at least two times within the past 550,000 years. In modern times hybridization between bonobos and chimpanzees in the wild is prevented as populations are allopatric and kept isolated on different sides of the Congo river.

Within captivity, hybrids between bonobos and chimpanzees have been recorded. Between 1990 and 1992, five pregnancies were conceived and studied between a male bonobo and two female chimpanzees. The two initial pregnancies were aborted because of environmental stressors. The following three pregnancies however led to the birth of three hybrid offspring.

A bonobo and chimpanzee hybrid called Tiby was also featured in the 2017 Swedish film The Square. This same male bonobo and female chimpanzee had several offspring.

== Description ==
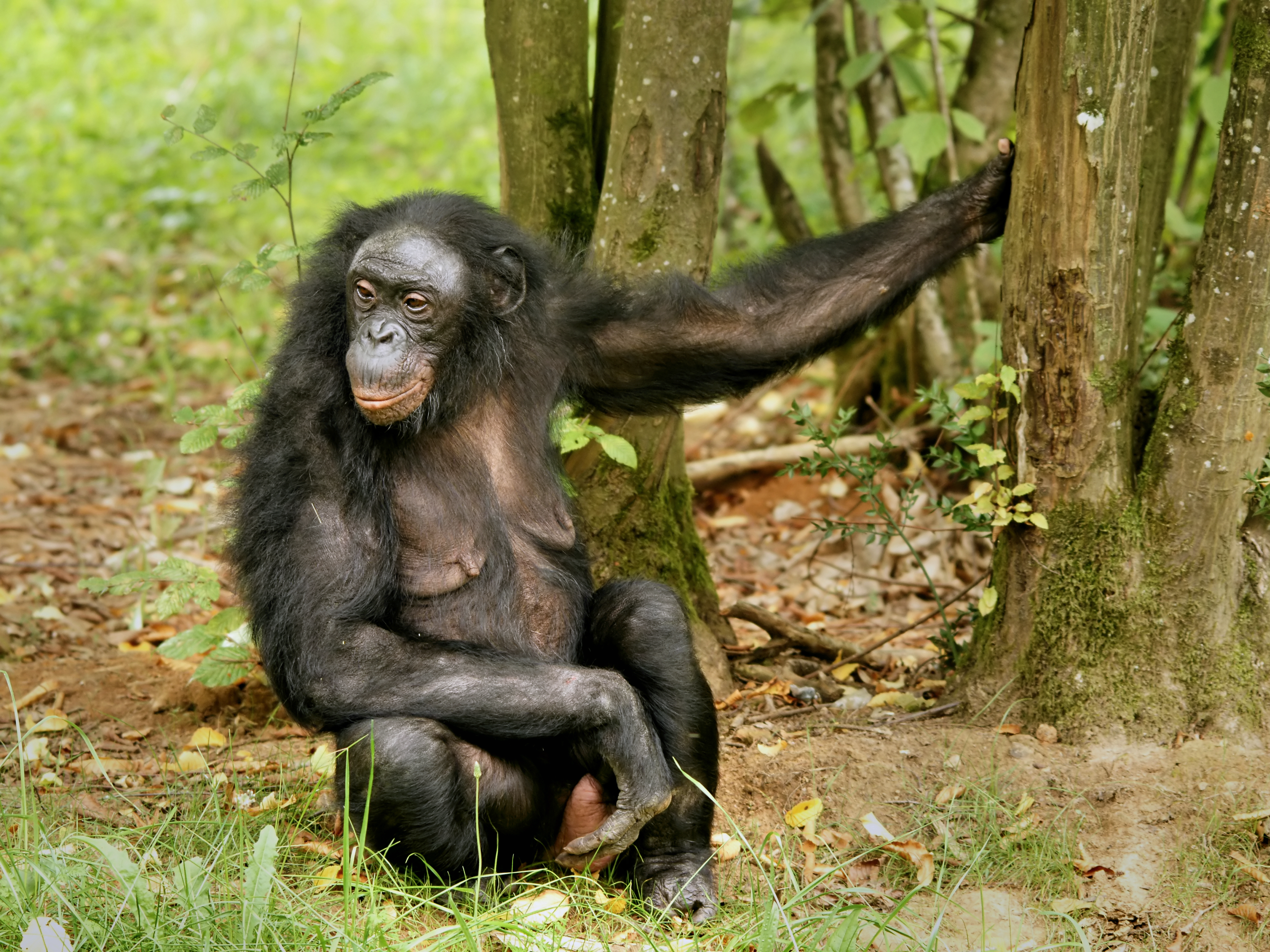
Bonobo female

The bonobo is commonly considered to be more gracile than the common chimpanzee. Although large male chimpanzees can exceed any bonobo in bulk and weight, the two species broadly overlap in body size. Adult female bonobos are somewhat smaller than adult males. Body mass ranges from 34 to 60 kg (75 to 132 lb) with an average weight of 45 kilograms (99 lb) in males against an average of 33 kg (73 lb) in females. The total length of bonobos (from the nose to the rump while on all fours) is 70 to 83 cm (28 to 33 in). Male bonobos average 119 cm (3.90 ft) when standing upright, compared to 111 centimetres (3.64 ft) in females. The bonobo's head is relatively smaller than that of the common chimpanzee with less prominent brow ridges above the eyes. It has a black face with pink lips, small ears, wide nostrils, and long hair on its head that forms a parting. Females have slightly more prominent breasts, in contrast to the flat breasts of other female apes, although not so prominent as those of humans. The bonobo also has a slim upper body, narrow shoulders, thin neck, and long legs when compared to the common chimpanzee.

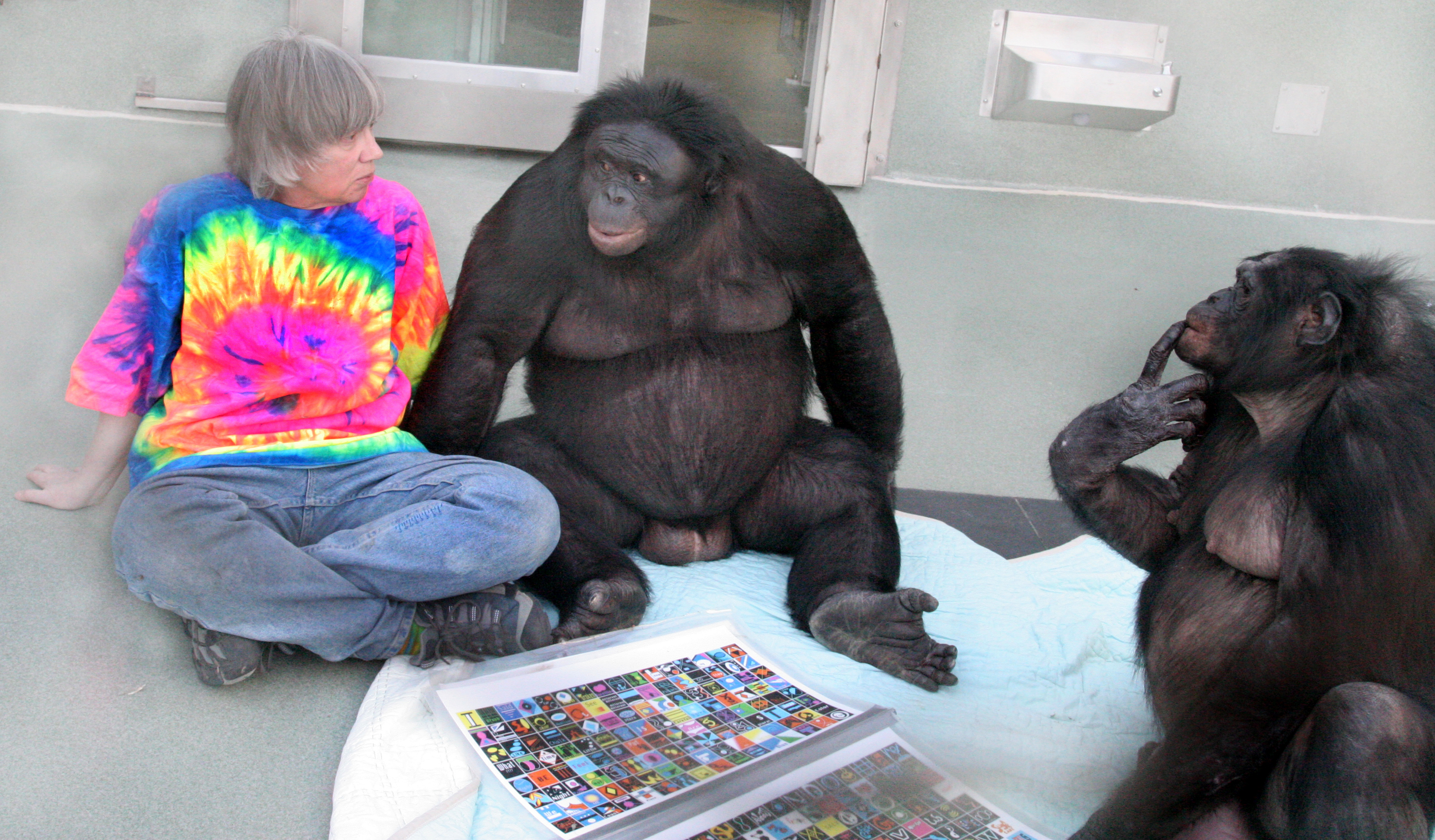
Bonobos Kanzi (C) and Panbanisha (R) with Sue Savage-Rumbaugh and the outdoor symbols "keyboard"

Bonobos are both terrestrial and arboreal. Most ground locomotion is characterized by quadrupedal knuckle-walking. Bipedal walking has been recorded as less than 1% of terrestrial locomotion in the wild, a figure that decreased with habituation, while in captivity there is a wide variation. Bipedal walking in captivity, as a percentage of bipedal plus quadrupedal locomotion bouts, has been observed from 3.9% for spontaneous bouts to nearly 19% when abundant food is provided. These physical characteristics and its posture give the bonobo an appearance more closely resembling that of humans than the common chimpanzee does. The bonobo also has highly individuated facial features, as humans do, so that one individual may look significantly different from another, a characteristic adapted for visual facial recognition in social interaction.

Multivariate analysis has shown bonobos are more neotenised than the common chimpanzee, taking into account such features as the proportionately long torso length of the bonobo. Other researchers challenged this conclusion.

== Behaviour ==
Primatologist Frans de Waal states bonobos are capable of altruism, compassion, empathy, kindness, patience, and sensitivity, and described "bonobo society" as a "gynecocracy" (Note: Gynecocracy among people, 'women's government over women and men' or 'women's social supremacy') (i.e. a matriarchy). Primatologists who have studied bonobos in the wild have documented a wide range of behaviours, including aggressive behaviour and more cyclic sexual behaviour similar to chimpanzees, even though bonobos show more sexual behaviour in a greater variety of relationships. An analysis of female bonding among wild bonobos by Takeshi Furuichi stresses female sexuality and shows how female bonobos spend much more time in oestrus than female chimpanzees.

Some primatologists have argued that De Waal's data reflect only the behaviour of captive bonobos, suggesting that wild bonobos show levels of aggression closer to what is found among chimpanzees. De Waal has responded that the contrast in temperament between bonobos and chimpanzees observed in captivity is meaningful, because it controls for the influence of environment. The two species behave quite differently even if kept under identical conditions. A 2014 study also found bonobos to be less aggressive than chimpanzees, particularly eastern chimpanzees. The authors argued that the relative peacefulness of western chimpanzees and bonobos was primarily due to ecological factors. Bonobos warn each other of danger less efficiently than chimpanzees in the same situation.

Nonetheless, in April 2024, biologists reported that bonobos behave more aggressively than thought earlier.

In a study published in February 2025, scientists determined that bonobos could tell when humans did not know something. The findings advance researchers' proposal that like humans, chimpanzees and bonobos—humans' closest evolutionary cousins—may also possess theory of mind.

=== Social behaviour ===
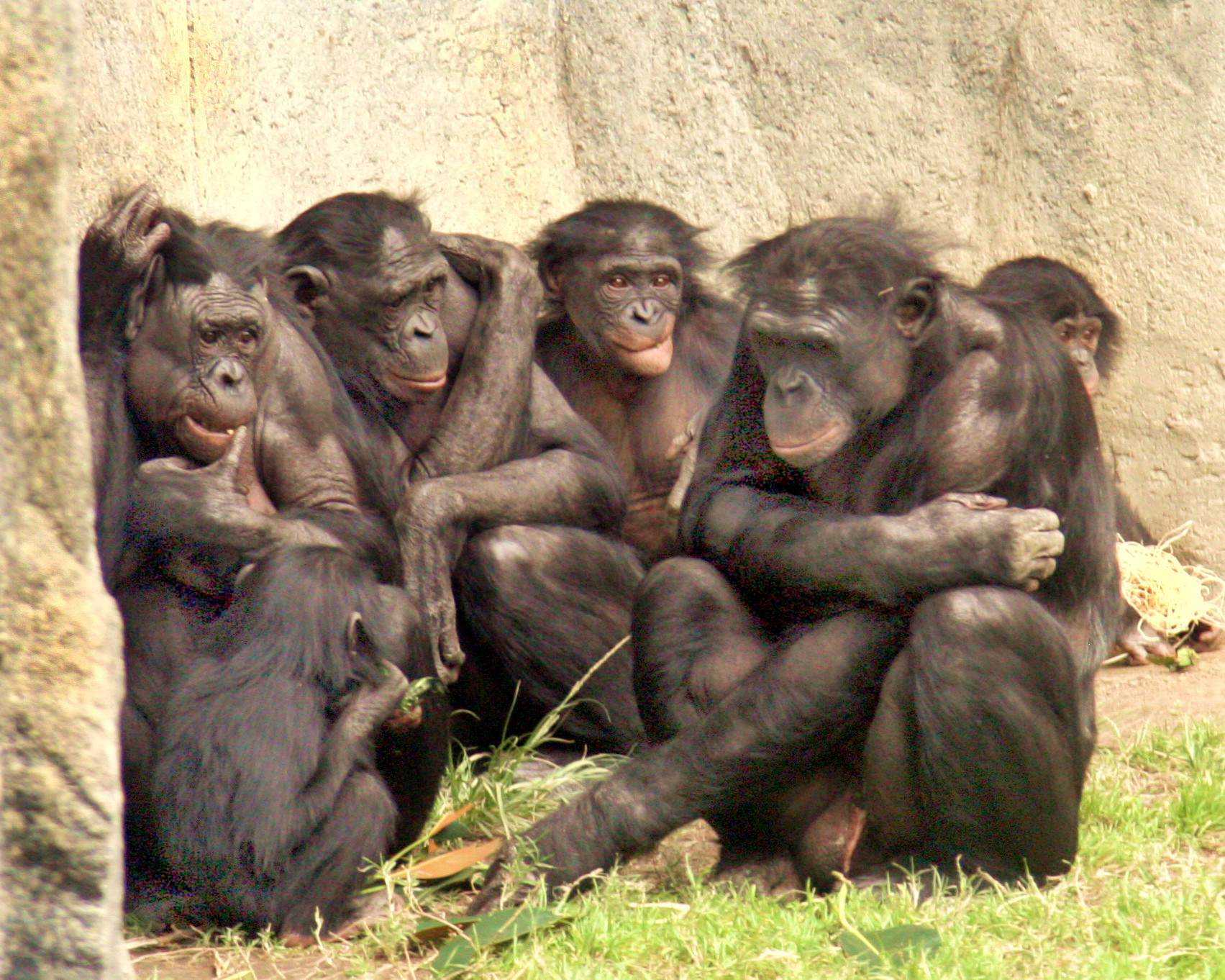
Bonobos are very social.

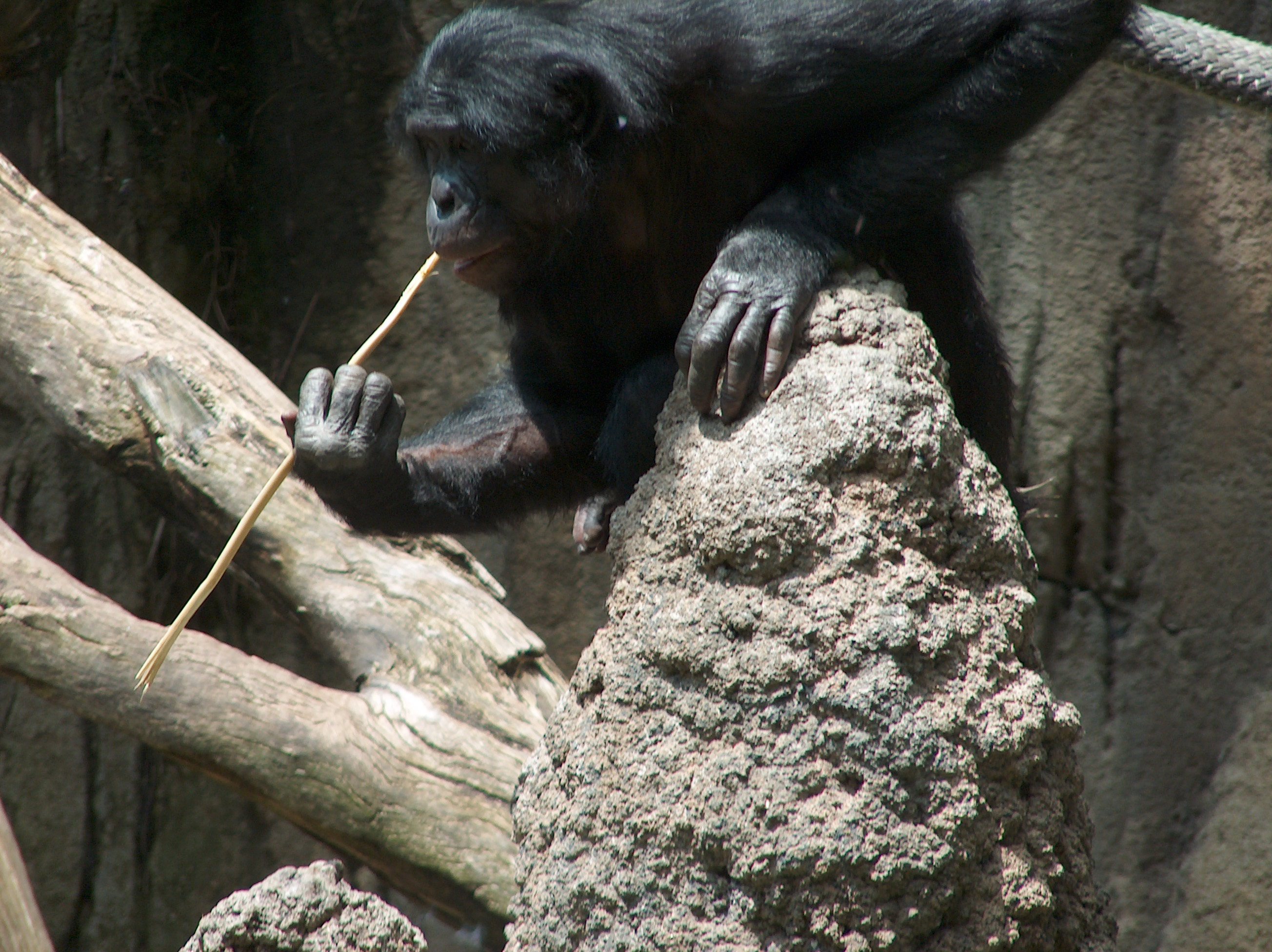
Bonobo searching for termites

Bonobos are unusual among apes for their matriarchal social structure (extensive overlap between the male and female hierarchies leads some to refer to them as gender-balanced in their power structure). Bonobos do not have a defined territory and communities will travel over a wide range. Because of the nomadic nature of the females and evenly distributed food in their environment, males do not gain any obvious advantages by forming alliances with other males, or by defending a home range, as chimpanzees do. Female bonobos possess sharper canines than female chimpanzees, further fueling their status in the group. Although a male bonobo is dominant to a female in a dyadic interaction, depending on the community, socially-bonded females may be co-dominant with males or dominant over them, even to the extent that females can coerce reluctant males into mating with them.

At the top of the hierarchy is a coalition of high-ranking females and males typically headed by an old, experienced matriarch who acts as the decision-maker and leader of the group. Female bonobos typically earn their rank through experience, age, and ability to forge alliances with other females in their group, rather than physical intimidation, and top-ranking females will protect immigrant females from male harassment. While bonobos are often called matriarchal, and while every community is dominated by a female, some males will still obtain a high rank and act as coalitionary partners to the alpha female, often taking initiative in coordinating the group's movements. These males may outrank not only the other males in the group, but also many females. Certain males alert the group to any possible threats, protecting the group from predators such as Central African rock pythons, leopards and possibly African golden cats and crowned eagles.

Aggressive encounters between males and females are rare, and males are tolerant of infants and juveniles. A male derives his status from the status of his mother. The mother–son bond often stays strong and continues throughout life. While social hierarchies do exist, and although the son of a high ranking female may outrank a lower female, rank plays a less prominent role than in other primate societies. Relationships between different communities are often positive and affiliative, and bonobos are not a territorial species. Bonobos will also share food with others, even unrelated strangers. Bonobos exhibit paedomorphism (retaining infantile physical characteristics and behaviours), which greatly inhibits aggression and enables unfamiliar bonobos to freely mingle and cooperate with each other.

Males engage in lengthy friendships with females and, in turn, female bonobos prefer to associate with and mate with males who are respectful and easygoing around them. Because female bonobos can use alliances to rebuff coercive and domineering males and select males at their own leisure, they show preference for males who are not aggressive towards them. Aging bonobos lose their playful streak and become noticeably more irritable in old age. Both sexes have a similar level of aggressiveness. Bonobos live in a male philopatric society where the females immigrate to new communities while males remain in their natal troop. However, it is not entirely unheard of for males to occasionally transfer into new groups. Additionally, females with powerful mothers may remain in their natal clan.

Alliances between males are poorly developed in most bonobo communities, while females will form alliances with each other and alliances between males and females occur, including multisex hunting parties. There is a confirmed case of a grown male bonobo adopting his orphaned infant brother. A mother bonobo will also support her grown son in conflicts with other males and help him secure better ties with other females, enhancing her chance of gaining grandchildren from him. She will even take measures such as physical intervention to prevent other males from breeding with certain females she wants her son to mate with. Although mothers play a role in aiding their sons, and the hierarchy among males is largely reflected by their mother's social status, some motherless males will still successfully dominate some males who do have mothers.

Female bonobos have also been observed fostering infants from outside their established community. Bonobos are not known to kill each other, and are generally less violent than chimpanzees, yet aggression still manifests itself in this species. Although female bonobos dominate males and selectively mate with males who do not exhibit aggression toward them, competition between the males themselves is intense and high-ranking males secure more matings than low-ranking ones. Indeed, the size difference between males and females is more pronounced in bonobos than it is in chimpanzees, as male bonobos do not form alliances and therefore have little incentive to hold back when fighting for access to females. Male bonobos are known to attack each other and inflict serious injuries such as missing digits, damaged eyes and torn ears. Some of these injuries may also occur when a male threatens the high ranking females and is injured by them, as the larger male is swarmed and outnumbered by a female mob.

Because of the promiscuous mating behaviour of female bonobos, a male cannot be sure which offspring are his. As a result, the entirety of parental care in bonobos is assumed by the mothers. However, bonobos are not as promiscuous as chimpanzees and slightly polygamous tendencies occur, with high-ranking males enjoying greater reproductive success than low-ranking males. Unlike chimpanzees, where any male can coerce a female into mating with him, female bonobos enjoy greater sexual preferences and can rebuff undesirable males, an advantage of female-female bonding, and actively seek out higher-ranking males.

Bonobo party size tends to vary because the groups exhibit a fission–fusion pattern. A community of approximately 100 will split into small groups during the day while looking for food, and then will come back together to sleep. They sleep in nests that they construct in trees. Female bonobos more often than not secure feeding privileges and feed before males do, and although they are rarely successful in one-on-one confrontations with males, a female bonobo with several allies supporting her has extremely high success in monopolizing food sources. Different communities favour different prey. In some communities females exclusively hunt and have a preference for rodents, in others both sexes hunt, and will target monkeys. In captive settings, females exhibit extreme food-based aggression towards males, and forge coalitions against them to monopolize specific food items, often going as far as to mutilate any males who fail to heed their warning. In wild settings, however, female bonobos will quietly ask males for food if they had gotten it first, instead of forcibly confiscating it, suggesting sex-based hierarchy roles are less rigid than in captive colonies. Female bonobos are known to lead hunts on duikers and successfully defend their bounty from marauding males in the wild. They are more tolerant of younger males pestering them yet exhibit heightened aggression towards older males.

In a study published in November 2023, scientists reported, for the first time, evidence that groups of primates, particularly bonobos, are capable of cooperating with each other. Researchers observed unprecedented cooperation between two distinct bonobo groups in the Congo's Kokolopori Bonobo Reserve, Ekalakala and Kokoalongo, challenging traditional notions of ape societies. Over two years of observation, researchers witnessed 95 encounters between the groups. Contrary to expectations, these interactions resembled those within a single group. During these encounters, the bonobos engaged in behaviours such as grooming, food sharing, and collective defense against threats like snakes. Notably, the two groups, while displaying cooperative tendencies, maintained distinct identities, and there was no evidence of interbreeding or a blending of cultures. The cooperation observed was not arbitrary but evolved through individual bonds formed by exchanging favors and gifts. Some bonobos even formed alliances to target a third individual, demonstrating a nuanced social dynamic within the groups.

==== Sociosexual behaviour ====
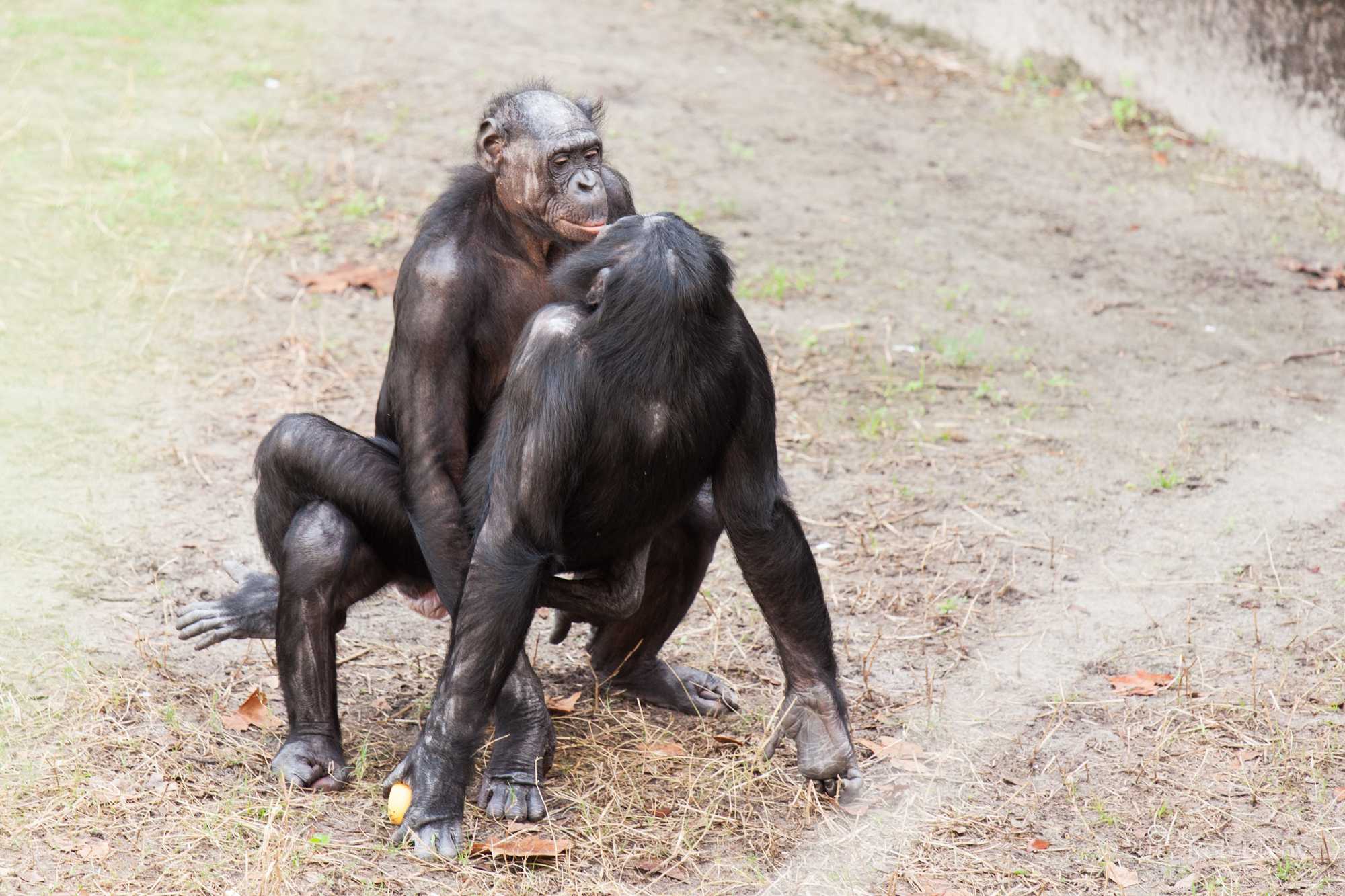
Bonobos mating, Jacksonville Zoo and Gardens

Sexual activity generally plays a major role in bonobo society, being used as what some scientists perceive as a greeting, a means of forming social bonds, a means of conflict resolution, and postconflict reconciliation. Bonobos are the only non-human animal to have been observed engaging in tongue kissing. Bonobos and humans are the only primates to typically engage in face-to-face genital sex, although a pair of western gorillas has also been photographed in this position.

Bonobos do not form permanent monogamous sexual relationships with individual partners. They also do not seem to discriminate in their sexual behaviour by sex or age, with the possible exception of abstaining from sexual activity between mothers and their adult sons. When bonobos come upon a new food source or feeding ground, the increased excitement will usually lead to communal sexual activity, presumably decreasing tension and encouraging peaceful feeding.

More often than the males, female bonobos engage in mutual genital-rubbing behaviour, possibly to bond socially with each other, thus forming a female nucleus of bonobo society. The bonding among females enables them to dominate most of the males. Adolescent females often leave their native community to join another community. This migration mixes the bonobo gene pools, providing genetic diversity. Sexual bonding with other females establishes these new females as members of the group.

Bonobo clitorises are larger and more externalized than in most mammals; while the weight of a young adolescent female bonobo "is maybe half" that of a human teenager, she has a clitoris that is "three times bigger than the human equivalent, and visible enough to waggle unmistakably as she walks". In scientific literature, the female–female behavior of bonobos pressing vulvas together is often referred to as genito-genital (GG) rubbing. This sexual activity happens within the immediate female bonobo community and sometimes outside of it. Ethologist Jonathan Balcombe stated that female bonobos rub their clitorises together rapidly for ten to twenty seconds, and this behaviour, "which may be repeated in rapid succession, is usually accompanied by grinding, shrieking, and clitoral engorgement"; he added that it is estimated that they engage in this practice "about once every two hours" on average. As bonobos occasionally copulate face-to-face, "evolutionary biologist Marlene Zuk has suggested that the position of the clitoris in bonobos and some other primates has evolved to maximize stimulation during sexual intercourse". The position of the clitoris may alternatively permit GG-rubbings, which has been hypothesized to function as a means for female bonobos to evaluate their intrasocial relationships.

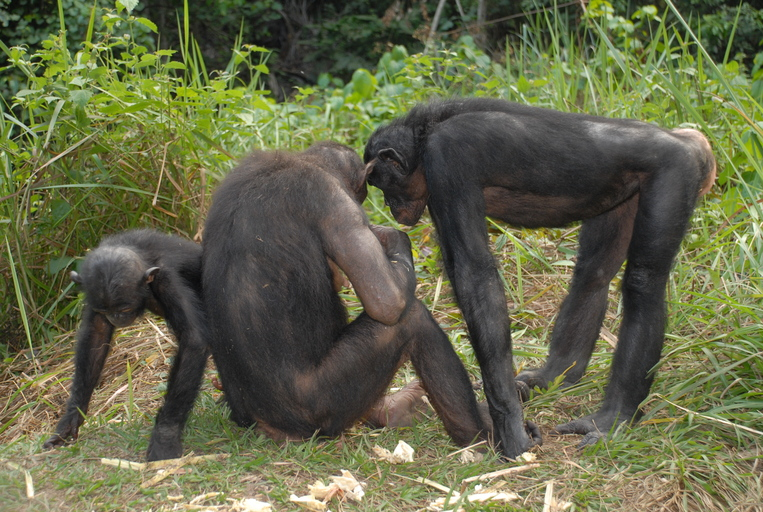
Group of bonobos

Bonobo males engage in various forms of male–male genital behavior. The most common form of male–male mounting is similar to that of a heterosexual mounting: one of the males sits "passively on his back [with] the other male thrusting on him", with the penises rubbing together because of both males' erections. In another, rarer form of genital rubbing, two bonobo males hang from a tree limb face-to-face while penis fencing. This also may occur when two males rub their penises together while in face-to-face position. Another form of genital interaction (rump rubbing) often occurs to express reconciliation between two males after a conflict, when they stand back-to-back and rub their scrotal sacs together, but such behaviour also occurs outside agonistic contexts: Kitamura (1989) observed rump–rump contacts between adult males following sexual solicitation behaviours similar to those between female bonobos prior to GG-rubbing. Takayoshi Kano observed similar practices among bonobos in the natural habitat. Tongue kissing, oral sex, and genital massaging have also been recorded among male bonobos.

Wild females give birth for the first time at 13 or 14 years of age. Bonobo reproductive rates are no higher than those of the common chimpanzee. However, female bonobo oestrus periods are longer. During oestrus, females undergo a swelling of the perineal tissue lasting 10 to 20 days. The gestation period is on average 240 days. Postpartum amenorrhea (absence of menstruation) lasts less than one year and a female may resume external signs of oestrus within a year of giving birth, though the female is probably not fertile at this point. Female bonobos carry and nurse their young for four years and give birth on average every 4.6 years. Compared to common chimpanzees, bonobo females resume the genital swelling cycle much sooner after giving birth, enabling them to rejoin the sexual activities of their society. Also, bonobo females which are sterile or too young to reproduce still engage in sexual activity. Mothers will help their sons get more matings from females in oestrus.

Adult male bonobos have sex with infants, although without penetration. Adult females also have sex with infants, but less frequently. Infants are not passive participants. They quite often initiate contacts with both adult males and females, as well as with peers. They have also been shown to be sexually active even in the absence of any stimulation or learning from adults.

Infanticide, while well documented in chimpanzees, is apparently absent in bonobo society. Although infanticide has not been directly observed, there have been documented cases of both female and male bonobos kidnapping infants, sometimes resulting in infants dying from dehydration. Although male bonobos have not yet been seen to practice infanticide, there is a documented incident in captivity involving a dominant female abducting an infant from a lower-ranking female, treating the infant roughly and denying it the chance to suckle. During the kidnapping, the infant's mother was clearly distressed and tried to retrieve her infant. Had the zookeepers not intervened, the infant almost certainly would have died from dehydration. This suggests female bonobos can have hostile rivalries with each other and a propensity to carry out infanticide. The highly sexual nature of bonobo society and the fact that there is little competition over mates means that many males and females are mating with each other, in contrast to the one dominant male chimpanzee that fathers most of the offspring in a group. The strategy of bonobo females mating with many males may be a counterstrategy to infanticide because it confuses paternity. If male bonobos cannot distinguish their own offspring from others, the incentive for infanticide essentially disappears. This is a reproductive strategy that seems specific to bonobos; infanticide is observed in all other great apes except orangutans. Bonobos engage in sexual activity numerous times a day.

It is unknown how the bonobo avoids simian immunodeficiency virus (SIV) and its effects.

==== Peacefulness ====
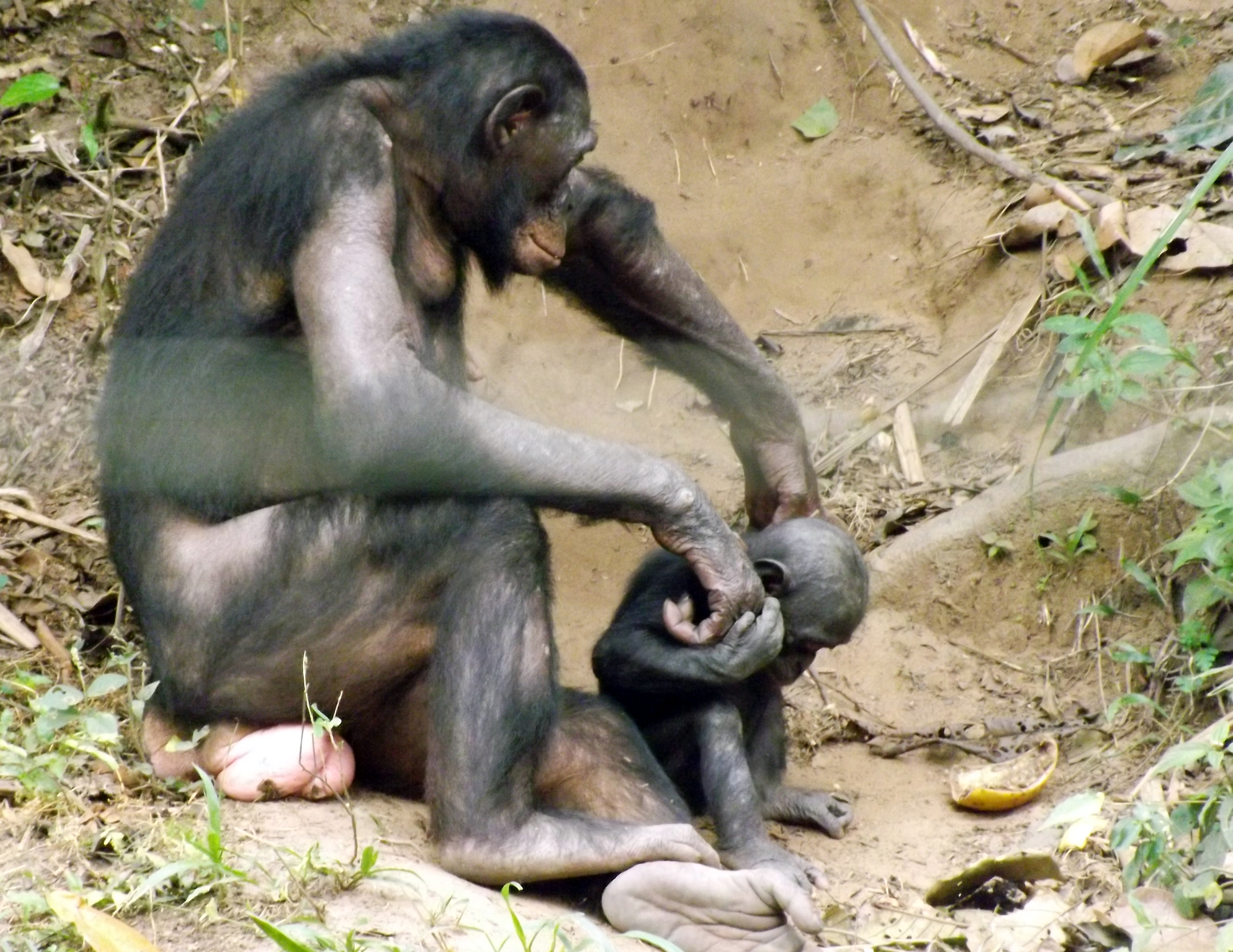
Bonobo (Pan paniscus) mother and infant at Lola ya Bonobo

Observations in the wild indicate that the males among the related common chimpanzee communities are hostile to males from outside the community. Parties of males "patrol" for the neighboring males that might be traveling alone, and attack those single males, often killing them. This does not appear to be the behaviour of bonobo males or females, which seem to prefer sexual contact over violent confrontation with outsiders.

While bonobos are more peaceful than chimpanzees, it is not true that they are unaggressive. In the wild, among males, bonobos are more aggressive than chimpanzees, having higher rates of aggressive acts, about three times as much. Although, male chimpanzees are more likely to be aggressive to a lethal degree than male bonobos which are more likely to engage in more frequent, yet less intense squabbling. There is also more female to male aggression with bonobos than there is with chimpanzees. Female bonobos are also more aggressive than female chimpanzees, in general. Both bonobos and chimpanzees exhibit physical aggression more than 100 times as often as humans do.

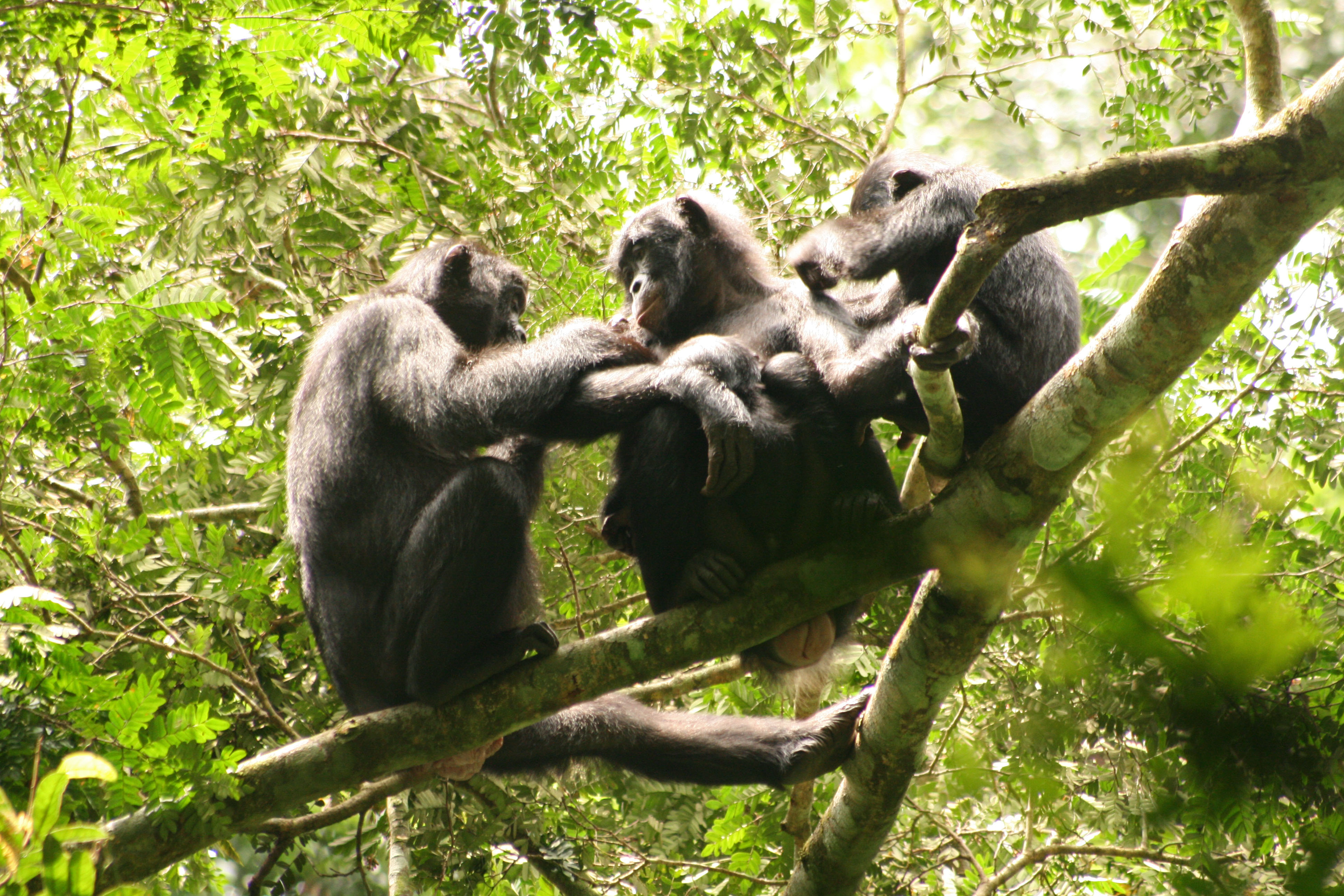
Grooming: reinforcement of social links

Although referred to as peaceful, bonobo aggression is not restricted to each other, and humans have also been attacked by bonobos, and suffered serious, albeit non-fatal, injuries. Bonobos are far less violent than chimpanzees, though, as lethal aggression is essentially nonexistent among bonobos while being not infrequent among chimpanzees. It has been hypothesized that bonobos are able to live a more peaceful lifestyle in part because of an abundance of nutritious vegetation in their natural habitat, allowing them to travel and forage in large parties.

Recent studies show that there are significant brain differences between bonobos and chimpanzees. Bonobos have more grey matter volume in the right anterior insula, right dorsal amygdala, hypothalamus, and right dorsomedial prefrontal cortex, all of which are regions assumed to be vital for feeling empathy, sensing distress in others and feeling anxiety. They also have a thick connection between the amygdala, an important area that can spark aggression, and the ventral anterior cingulate cortex, which has been shown to help control impulses in humans. This thicker connection may make them better at regulating their emotional impulses and behavior.

Bonobo society is dominated by females, and severing the lifelong alliance between mothers and their male offspring may make them vulnerable to female aggression. De Waal has warned of the danger of romanticizing bonobos: "All animals are competitive by nature and cooperative only under specific circumstances" and that "when first writing about their behaviour, I spoke of 'sex for peace' precisely because bonobos had plenty of conflicts. There would obviously be no need for peacemaking if they lived in perfect harmony."

Surbeck and Hohmann showed in 2008 that bonobos sometimes do hunt monkey species. Five incidents were observed in a group of bonobos in Salonga National Park, which seemed to reflect deliberate cooperative hunting. On three occasions, the hunt was successful, and infant monkeys were captured and eaten.

There is one inferred intraspecies killing in the wild, and a confirmed lethal attack in captivity. In both cases, the attackers were female and the victims were male.

=== Diet ===
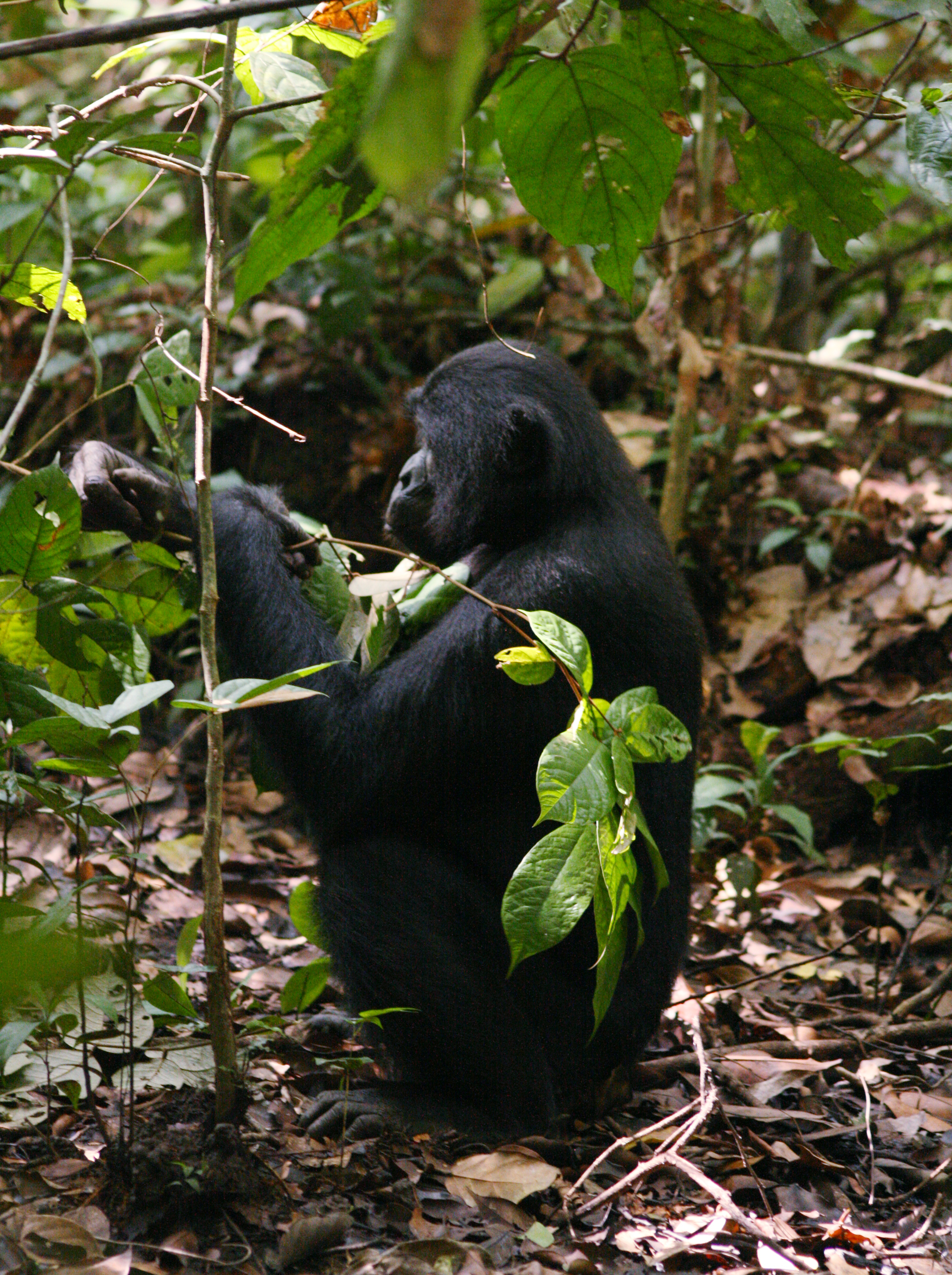
Folivory: bonobos use certain species for self-medication.

The bonobo is an omnivorous frugivore; 57% of its diet is fruit, but this is supplemented with leaves, honey, eggs, meat from small vertebrates such as anomalures, flying squirrels and duikers, and invertebrates. The truffle species Hysterangium bonobo is eaten by bonobos. In some instances, bonobos have been shown to consume lower-order primates. Some claim bonobos have also been known to practise cannibalism in captivity, a claim disputed by others. However, at least one confirmed report of cannibalism in the wild of a dead infant was described in 2008. A 2016 paper reported two more instances of infant cannibalism, although it was not confirmed if infanticide was involved.

=== Cognitive comparisons to chimpanzees ===
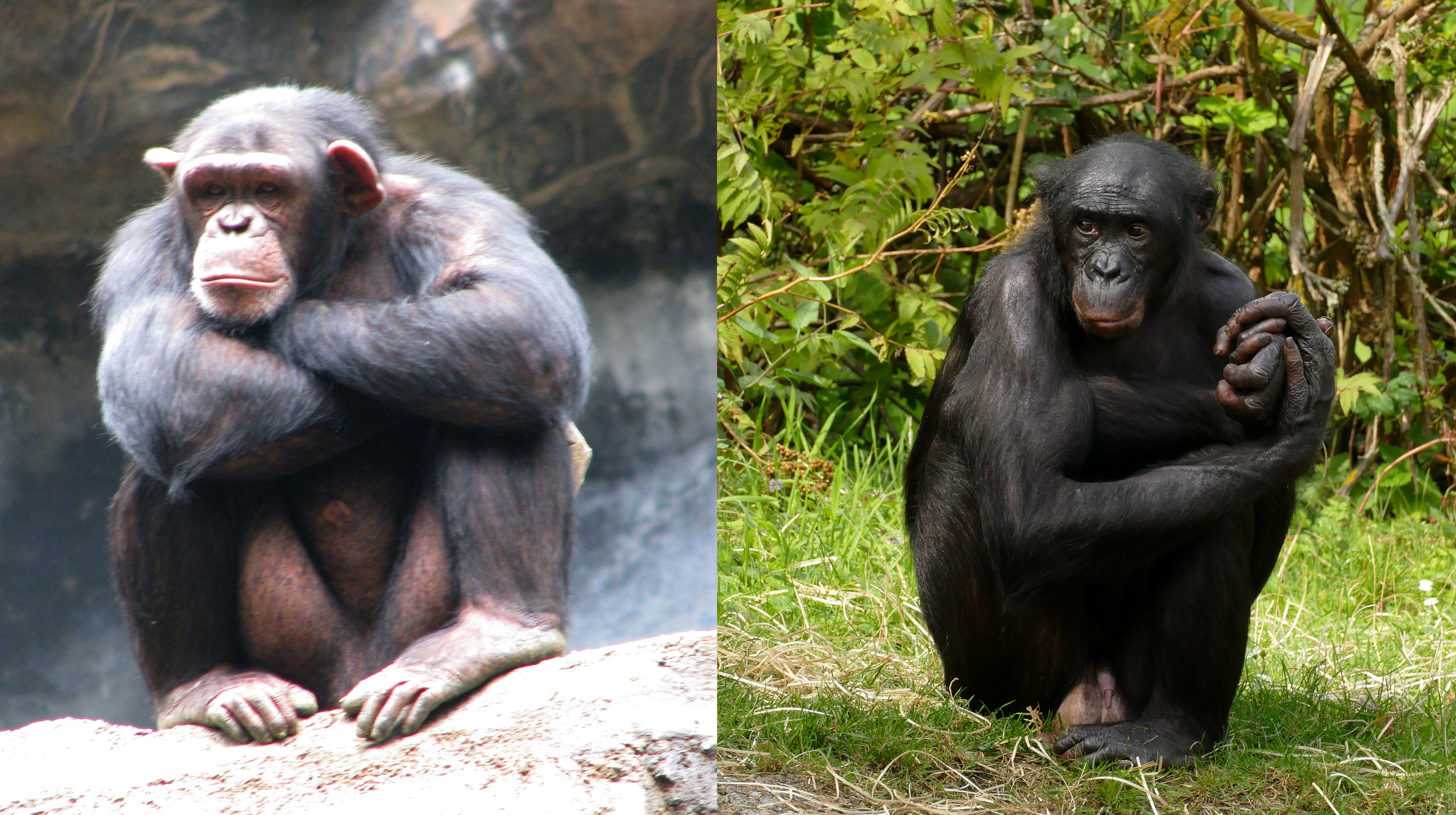
Chimpanzee and bonobo males

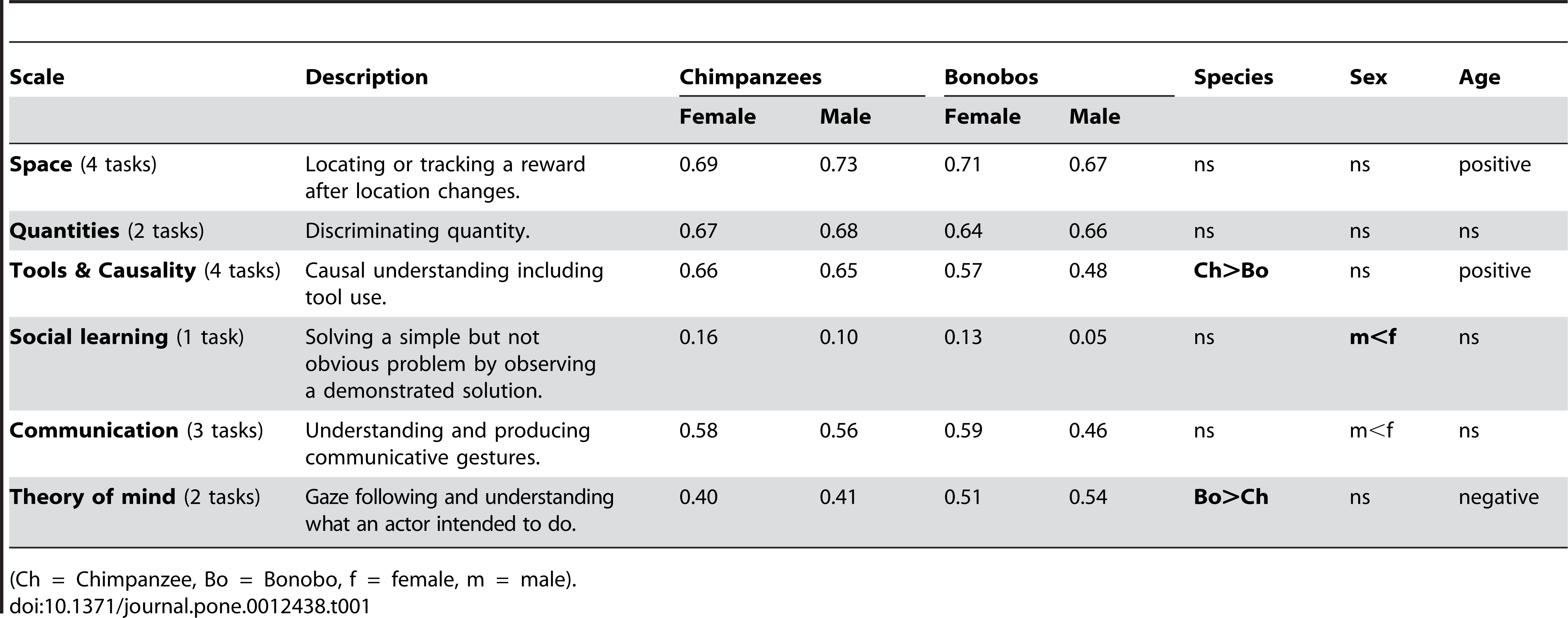
A comparison of chimpanzees' and bonobos' performance on various cognitive tests

In 2020, the first whole-genome comparison between chimpanzees and bonobos was published and showed genomic aspects that may underlie or have resulted from their divergence and behavioural differences, including selection for genes related to diet and hormones. A 2010 study found that "female bonobos displayed a larger range of tool use behaviours than males, a pattern previously described for chimpanzees but not for other great apes". This finding was affirmed by the results of another 2010 study which also found that "bonobos were more skilled at solving tasks related to theory of mind or an understanding of social causality, while chimpanzees were more skilled at tasks requiring the use of tools and an understanding of physical causality". Bonobos have been found to be more risk-averse compared to chimpanzees, preferring immediate rather than delayed rewards when it comes to foraging. Bonobos also have a weaker spatial memory compared to chimpanzees, with adult bonobos performing comparably to juvenile chimpanzees.

=== Similarity to humans ===
Bonobos are capable of passing the mirror-recognition test for self-awareness, as are all great apes. They communicate primarily through vocal means, although the meanings of their vocalizations are not currently known. However, most humans do understand their facial expressions and some of their natural hand gestures, such as their invitation to play. The communication system of wild bonobos includes a characteristic that was earlier only known in humans: bonobos use the same call to mean different things in different situations, and the other bonobos have to take the context into account when determining the meaning.

Two bonobos at the Great Ape Trust, Kanzi and Panbanisha, were taught how to communicate using a keyboard labeled with lexigrams (geometric symbols) and they could respond to spoken sentences. Kanzi’s vocabulary consisted of more than 500 English words, and he had comprehension of around 3,000 spoken English words.

Kanzi is also known for learning by observing people trying to teach his mother; Kanzi started doing the tasks that his mother was taught just by watching, some of which his mother had failed to learn. Some, such as philosopher and bioethicist Peter Singer, argue that these results qualify them for "rights to survival and life"—rights which humans theoretically accord to all persons (See great ape personhood).

In the 1990s, Kanzi was taught to make and use simple stone tools. This resulted from a study undertaken by researchers Kathy Schick and Nicholas Toth, and later Gary Garufi. The researchers wanted to know if Kanzi possessed the cognitive and biomechanical abilities required to make and use stone tools. Though Kanzi was able to form flakes, he did not create them in the same way as humans, who hold the core in one hand and knap it with the other; Kanzi threw the cobble against a hard surface or against another cobble. This allowed him to produce a larger force to initiate a fracture as opposed to knapping it in his hands.

As in other great apes and humans, third party affiliation toward the victim—the affinitive contact made toward the recipient of an aggression by a group member other than the aggressor—is present in bonobos. A 2013 study found that both the affiliation spontaneously offered by a bystander to the victim and the affiliation requested by the victim (solicited affiliation) can reduce the probability of further aggression by group members on the victim (this fact supporting the Victim-Protection Hypothesis). Yet, only spontaneous affiliation reduced victim anxiety—measured via self-scratching rates—thus suggesting not only that non-solicited affiliation has a consolatory function but also that the spontaneous gesture—more than the protection itself—works in calming the distressed subject. The authors hypothesize that the victim may perceive the motivational autonomy of the bystander, who does not require an invitation to provide post-conflict affinitive contact. Moreover, spontaneous—but not solicited—third party affiliation was affected by the bond between consoler and victim (this supporting the Consolation Hypothesis). Importantly, spontaneous affiliation followed the empathic gradient described for humans, being mostly offered to kin, then friends, then acquaintances (these categories having been determined using affiliation rates between individuals). Hence, consolation in the bonobo may be an empathy-based phenomenon.

Instances in which bonobos have expressed joy have been reported. One study analyzed and recorded sounds made by human infants and bonobos when they were tickled. Although the bonobos' laugh was at a higher frequency, the laugh was found to follow a spectrographic pattern similar to that of human babies.

== Distribution and habitat ==
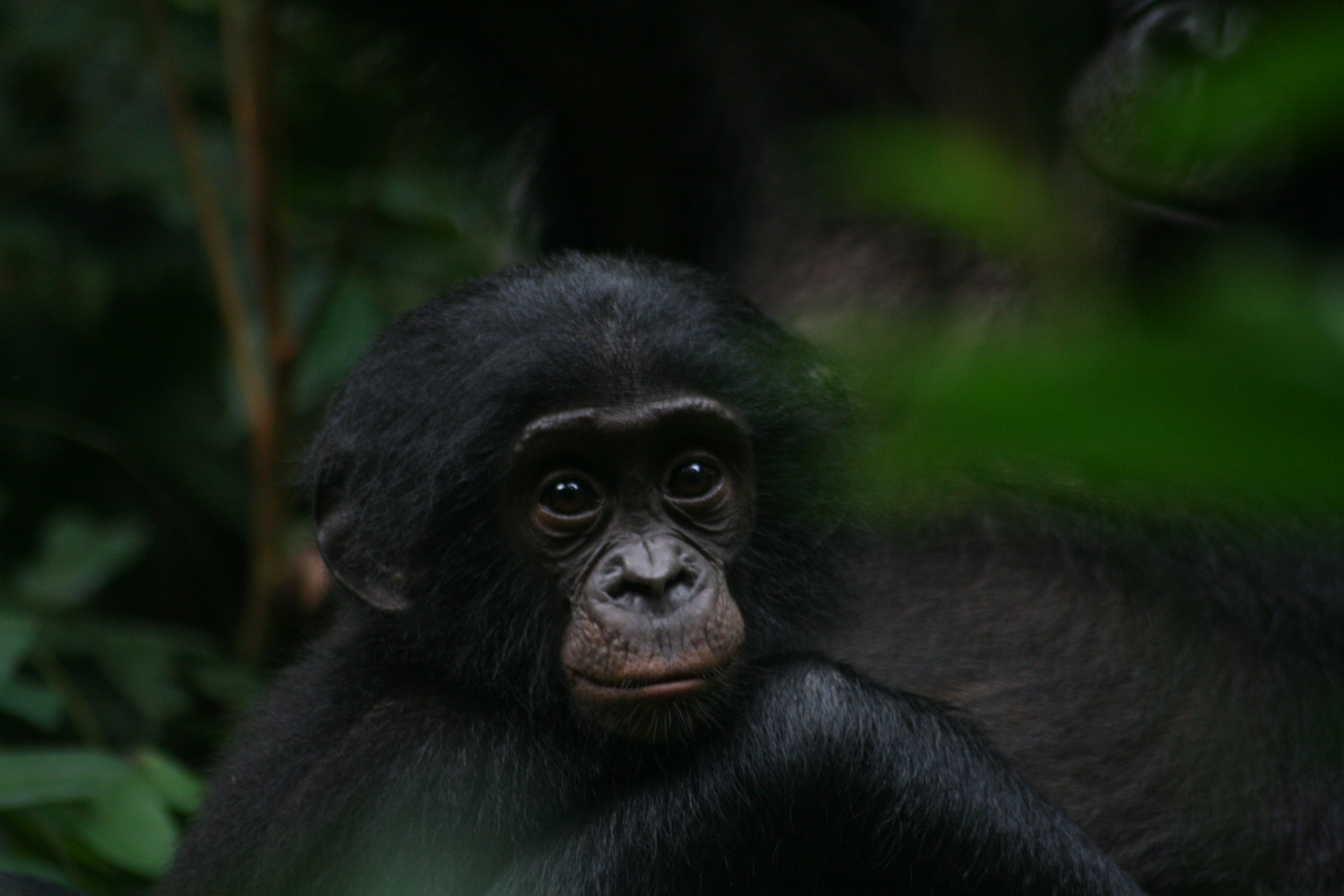
A year-old bonobo (Ulrik)

Bonobos are found only south of the Congo River and north of the Kasai River (a tributary of the Congo), in the humid forests of the Democratic Republic of Congo. Ernst Schwarz's 1927 paper "Le Chimpanzé de la Rive Gauche du Congo", announcing his discovery, has been read as an association between the Parisian Left Bank and the left bank of the Congo River; the bohemian culture in Paris, and an unconventional ape in the Congo. The ranges of bonobos and chimpanzees are separated by the Congo River, with bonobos living to its south and chimpanzees to the north.

== Ecological role ==
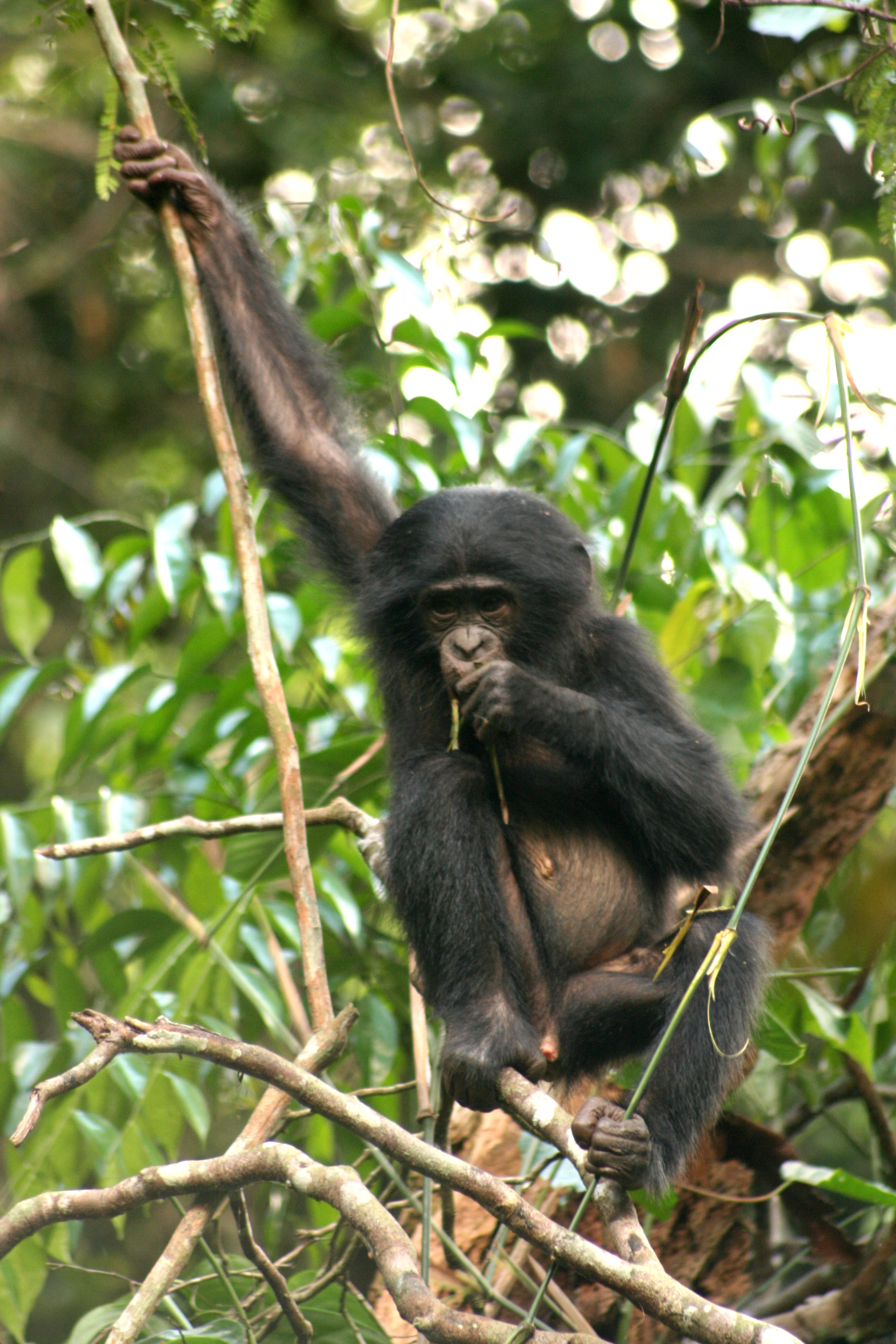
Bonobos disperse the seeds of more than 91 species of plants across distances of several kilometers.

In the Congo tropical rainforest, the very great majority of plants need animals to reproduce and disperse their seeds. Bonobos are the second largest frugivorous animals in this region, after elephants. It is estimated that during its life, each bonobo will ingest and disperse nine tons of seeds, from more than 91 species of lianas, grass, trees and shrubs. These seeds travel for about 24 hours in the bonobo digestive tract, which can transfer them over several kilometers (mean 1.3 km; max: 4.5 km), far from their parents, where they will be deposited intact in their feces. These dispersed seeds remain viable, germinating better and more quickly than unpassed seeds. For those seeds, diplochory with dung-beetles (Scarabaeidae) improves post-dispersal survival.

Certain plants such as Dialium may even be dependent on bonobos to activate the germination of their seeds, characterized by tegumentary dormancy. The first parameters of the effectiveness of seed dispersal by bonobos are present. Behaviour of the bonobo could affect the population structure of plants whose seeds they disperse. The majority of these zoochorous plants cannot recruit without dispersal and the homogeneous spatial structure of the trees suggests a direct link with their dispersal agent. Few species could replace bonobos in terms of seed dispersal services, just as bonobos could not replace elephants. There is little functional redundancy between frugivorous mammals of the Congo, which face severe human hunting pressures and local extinction. The defaunation of the forests, leading to the empty forest syndrome, is critical in conservation biology. The disappearance of the bonobos, which disperse seeds of 40% of the tree species in these forests, or 11.6 million individual seeds during the life of each bonobo, would have consequences for the conservation of the Congo rainforest.

== Conservation status ==
The IUCN Red List classifies bonobos as an endangered species, with conservative population estimates ranging from 29,500 to 50,000 individuals. Major threats to bonobo populations include habitat loss and hunting for bushmeat, the latter activity having increased dramatically during the first and second Congo Wars in the Democratic Republic of Congo, due to the presence of heavily armed militias (even in remote, "protected" areas such as Salonga National Park). This is part of a more general trend of ape extinction.

As the bonobos' habitat is shared with many people, the ultimate success of conservation efforts still relies on local and community involvement. The issue of parks versus people is salient in the Cuvette Centrale, within the bonobos' range. There is strong local, and broad-based Congolese, resistance to establishing national parks, as indigenous communities have previously been driven from their forest homes by the forming of parks. In Salonga National Park (the only national park in bonobo habitat), there is no local involvement, and surveys undertaken since 2000 indicate the bonobo, the African forest elephant, the okapi, and other rare species have been devastated by poachers and the thriving bushmeat trade. In contrast, areas do exist where the bonobo and ecological biodiversity still thrive without any established park borders, because of the indigenous beliefs/taboos against killing bonobos and other animals.

During the wars in the 1990s, researchers and international non-governmental organisations (NGOs) were driven out of the bonobo habitat. In 2002, the Bonobo Conservation Initiative initiated the Bonobo Peace Forest Project (supported by the Global Conservation Fund of Conservation International), in cooperation with national institutions, local NGOs, and local communities; the Peace Forest Project works with local communities to establish a linked constellation of community-based reserves managed by local and indigenous people. This model, implemented mainly through DRC organisations and local communities, has helped bring about agreements to protect over 50,000 square miles (130,000 km^{2}) of the bonobo habitat. According to Amy Parish, the Bonobo Peace Forest "is going to be a model for conservation in the 21st century".

The port town of Basankusu is situated on the Lulonga River, at the confluence of the Lopori and Maringa Rivers, in the north of the country, making it well placed to receive and transport local goods to the cities of Mbandaka and Kinshasa. With Basankusu being the last port of substance before the wilderness of the Lopori Basin and the Lomako River—the bonobo heartland—conservation efforts for the bonobo use the town as a base.

In 1995, concern over declining numbers of bonobos in the wild led the Zoological Society of Milwaukee (ZSM), in Milwaukee, Wisconsin, with contributions from bonobo scientists around the world, to publish the Action Plan for Pan paniscus: A Report on Free Ranging Populations and Proposals for their Preservation. The Action Plan compiles population data on bonobos from 20 years of research conducted at various sites throughout the bonobo's range. The plan identifies priority actions for bonobo conservation and serves as a reference for developing conservation programs for researchers, government officials, and donor agencies.

Acting on Action Plan recommendations, the ZSM developed the Bonobo and Congo Biodiversity Initiative. This program includes habitat and rain-forest preservation, training for Congolese nationals and conservation institutions, wildlife population assessment and monitoring, and education. The ZSM has conducted regional surveys within the range of the bonobo in conjunction with training Congolese researchers in survey methodology and biodiversity monitoring. The ZSM's initial goal was to survey Salonga National Park to determine the conservation status of the bonobo within the park and to provide financial and technical assistance to strengthen park protection. As the project has developed, the ZSM has become more involved in helping the Congolese living in bonobo habitat. They have built schools, hired teachers, provided some medicines, and started an agriculture project to help the Congolese learn to grow crops and depend less on hunting wild animals.

With grants from the United Nations, USAID, the U.S. Embassy, the World Wildlife Fund, and many other groups and individuals, the ZSM also has been working to:

- Survey the bonobo population and its habitat to find ways to help protect these apes
- Develop antipoaching measures to help save apes, forest elephants, and other endangered animals in Congo's Salonga National Park, a UN World Heritage Site
- Provide training, literacy education, agricultural techniques, schools, equipment, and jobs for Congolese living near bonobo habitats so that they will have a vested interest in protecting the great apes – the ZSM started an agriculture project to help the Congolese learn to grow crops and depend less on hunting wild animals.
- Model small-scale conservation methods that can be used throughout Congo

Starting in 2003, the U.S. government allocated $54 million to the Congo Basin Forest Partnership. This significant investment has triggered the involvement of international NGOs to establish bases in the region and work to develop bonobo conservation programs. This initiative should improve the likelihood of bonobo survival, but its success still may depend upon building greater involvement and capability in local and indigenous communities.

The bonobo population is believed to have declined sharply in the last 30 years, though surveys have been hard to carry out in war-ravaged central Congo. Estimates range from 60,000 to fewer than 50,000 living, according to the World Wildlife Fund.

In addition, concerned parties have addressed the crisis on several science and ecological websites. Organisations such as the World Wide Fund for Nature, the African Wildlife Foundation, and others, are trying to focus attention on the extreme risk to the species. Some have suggested that a reserve be established in a more stable part of Africa, or on an island in a place such as Indonesia. Awareness is ever increasing, and even nonscientific or ecological sites have created various groups to collect donations to help with the conservation of this species.

== In human culture ==
World Bonobo Day is February 14 (Valentine's Day), established in 2017 by the African Wildlife Foundation.

== See also ==
- Basankusu, DR Congo – base for bonobo research and conservation
- Bonobo Conservation Initiative
- Chimpanzee genome project
- Claudine André
- Great ape personhood
- Great Ape Project
- International Primate Day
- Kanzi
- List of apes – notable individual nonhuman apes
- Lola ya Bonobo
- Koba, a fictional bonobo and antagonist of the Planet of the Apes reboot series
