= Demographics of the Democratic Republic of the Congo =

Demographics of Democratic Republic of the Congo
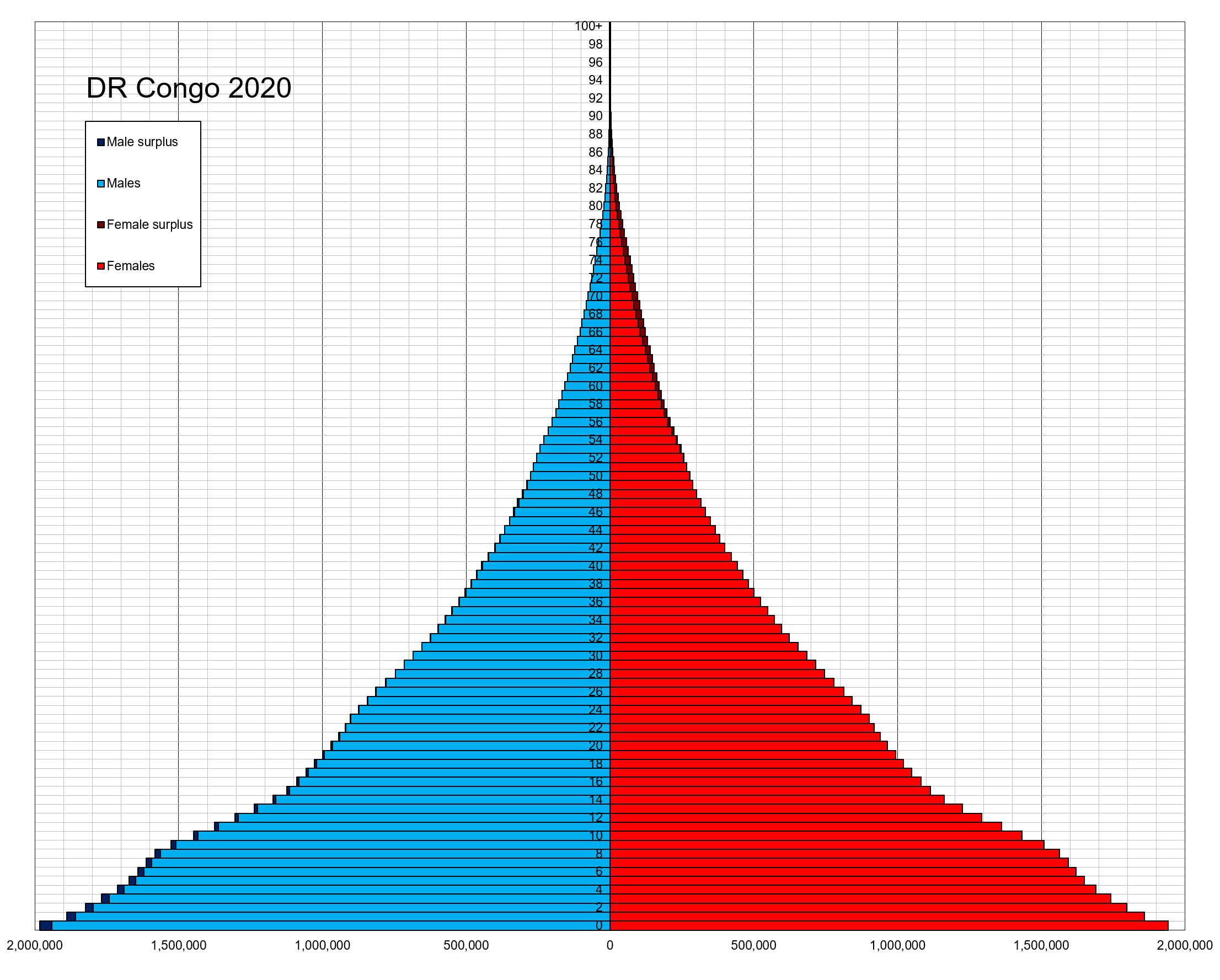
- Population pyramid of the Democratic Republic of the Congo in 2020
- Population: 95,894,118 (2021 est.)
- Growth rate: 3.24% (2022 est.)
- Birth rate: 40.4 births/1,000 population (2025 est.)
- Death rate: 8.3 deaths/1,000 population (2025 est.)
- Life expectancy: 61.83 years
  - male: 60.03 years
  - female: 63.69 years
- Fertility rate: 5.90 children born/woman (2025 est.)
- Infant mortality: 60.85 deaths/1,000 live births
- Net migration rate: -0.71 migrant(s)/1,000 population (2022 est.)
- Immigrant share: 1.0% (2024)

Age structure
- 0–14 years: 46.38%
- 65 and over: 2.47%

Sex ratio
- Total: 1 male(s)/female (2022 est.)
- At birth: 1.03 male(s)/female
- Under 15: 1.01 male(s)/female
- 65 and over: 0.6 male(s)/female

Nationality
- Nationality: Congolese

Language
- Official: French

Democratic Republic of the Congos population between 1960 and 2017.

Demographic features of the population of the Democratic Republic of the Congo include ethnicity, education level, health, economic status, religious affiliations and other aspects of the population.

As many as 250 ethnic groups have been distinguished and named. The most numerous people are the Luba, Mongo, and Kongo.

Although 700 local languages and dialects are spoken, the linguistic variety is bridged both by the use of French, and the intermediary languages Kikongo ya leta, Tshiluba, Swahili, and Lingala.

== Population ==
Historical population of the DR Congo

The CIA World Factbook estimated the population to be over 105 million as of 2022 (the exact number being 108,407,721), now exceeding that of Vietnam (with 98,721,275 inhabitants as of 2020) and ascending the country to the rank of 14th most populous in the world. The proportion of children below the age of 15 in 2020 was 46.38%, 51.15% of the population was between 15 and 65 years of age, while 2.47% was 65 years or older.

| | Total population | Population aged 0–14 (%) | Population aged 15–64 (%) | Population aged 65+ (%) |
|---|---|---|---|---|
| 1950 | 12 184 000 | 43.7 | 52.5 | 3.8 |
| 1955 | 13 580 000 | 43.8 | 53.1 | 3.1 |
| 1960 | 15 368 000 | 43.8 | 53.3 | 2.9 |
| 1965 | 17 543 000 | 43.9 | 53.2 | 2.8 |
| 1970 | 20 267 000 | 44.4 | 52.8 | 2.8 |
| 1975 | 23 317 000 | 44.9 | 52.3 | 2.8 |
| 1980 | 27 019 000 | 45.4 | 51.8 | 2.8 |
| 1985 | 31 044 000 | 46.1 | 51.1 | 2.8 |
| 1990 | 36 406 000 | 47.0 | 50.2 | 2.8 |
| 1995 | 44 067 000 | 47.9 | 49.4 | 2.7 |
| 2000 | 49 626 000 | 48.0 | 49.4 | 2.7 |
| 2005 | 57 421 000 | 47.5 | 49.9 | 2.7 |
| 2010 | 65 966 000 | 46.3 | 51.1 | 2.7 |
| 2020 | 101 780 263 | 46.4 | 51.2 | 2.5 |

Population Estimates by Sex and Age Group (01.VII.2020) (Post-censal estimates.) (Provisional.):

| Age group | Male | Female | Total | % |
|---|---|---|---|---|
| Total | 50 286 000 | 51 472 000 | 101 758 000 | 100 |
| 0–4 | 9 956 000 | 9 780 000 | 19 736 000 | 19.40 |
| 5–9 | 8 046 000 | 7 978 000 | 16 024 000 | 15.75 |
| 10–14 | 6 638 000 | 6 588 000 | 13 226 000 | 13.00 |
| 15–19 | 5 280 000 | 5 250 000 | 10 530 000 | 10.35 |
| 20–24 | 4 224 000 | 4 272 000 | 8 496 000 | 8.35 |
| 25–29 | 3 621 000 | 3 603 000 | 7 224 000 | 7.10 |
| 30–34 | 3 017 000 | 3 037 000 | 6 054 000 | 5.95 |
| 35–39 | 2 565 000 | 2 728 000 | 5 293 000 | 5.20 |
| 40–44 | 2 011 000 | 2 059 000 | 4 070 000 | 4.00 |
| 45–49 | 1 307 000 | 1 493 000 | 2 800 000 | 2.75 |
| 50–54 | 1 056 000 | 1 287 000 | 2 343 000 | 2.30 |
| 55–59 | 704 000 | 926 000 | 1 630 000 | 1.60 |
| 60–64 | 704 000 | 926 000 | 1 630 000 | 1.60 |
| 65–69 | 553 000 | 721 000 | 1 274 000 | 1.25 |
| 70–74 | 302 000 | 412 000 | 714 000 | 0.70 |
| 75+ | 302 000 | 412 000 | 714 000 | 0.70 |
| Age group | Male | Female | Total | Percent |
| 0–14 | 24 640 000 | 24 346 000 | 48 986 000 | 48.14 |
| 15–64 | 24 489 000 | 25 581 000 | 50 070 000 | 49.20 |
| 65+ | 1 157 000 | 1 545 000 | 2 702 000 | 2.66 |

Population Estimates by Sex and Age Group (DHS 2023-24):

| Age Group | Male | Female | Total |
|---|---|---|---|
| 0–4 | 17.6 | 15.4 | 16.5 |
| 5–9 | 17.5 | 16.4 | 17.0 |
| 10–14 | 16.0 | 15.5 | 15.7 |
| 15–19 | 10.7 | 9.9 | 10.3 |
| 20–24 | 7.0 | 8.3 | 7.7 |
| 25–29 | 5.1 | 6.3 | 5.7 |
| 30–34 | 4.4 | 5.2 | 4.8 |
| 35–39 | 4.6 | 5.1 | 4.9 |
| 40–44 | 3.8 | 3.5 | 3.6 |
| 45–49 | 2.9 | 2.8 | 2.9 |
| 50–54 | 2.6 | 3.9 | 3.3 |
| 55–59 | 2.0 | 2.4 | 2.2 |
| 60–64 | 2.6 | 2.0 | 2.3 |
| 65-69 | 1.5 | 1.4 | 1.4 |
| 70-74 | 0.8 | 0.9 | 0.8 |
| 75-79 | 0.5 | 0.5 | 0.5 |
| 80+ | 0.4 | 0.4 | 0.4 |
| Age group | Male | Female | Total |
| 0–14 | 51.1 | 47.3 | 49.2 |
| 15–64 | 45.7 | 49.5 | 47.7 |
| 65+ | 3.2 | 3.2 | 3.1 |

View source data.
View source data.
View source data.

=== Census ===
The first and so far only census conducted in DR Congo dates from 1984. A census is supposed to be conducted decennially, but this has been obstructed by periods of instability such as the political reorganization in 1991 and the civil war in 1996.

In January 2015, the parliament passed a law requiring that a census be completed before the next election. Opponents said this was intended to keep Joseph Kabila in power by delaying the next election, leading to protests that caused several deaths. The parliament repealed the law and the census did not take place.

The second general census of population and housing is underway as of 2024. President Félix Tshisekedi called for a census to improve demographic policies and to enable the creation of national identity cards. The National Office for Population Identification (ONIP), founded in 2011, was tasked with leading the census, settling a dispute between bids by the Ministries of Interior, Planning, and Digital Technology. Preliminary mapping was conducted in 2018 under Minister of State Modeste Bahati Lukwebo. Data collection began on 2 March 2020 and was scheduled to end on 10 June, but implementation was postponed due to the COVID-19 pandemic. Data collection was arranged by the Ministries of Planning, Budget, and Finance, and the electoral commission sent materials to the ONIP and the National Statistics Institute. In 2022, Prime Minister Sama Lukonde issued a decree about the operations of the census. The government allocated the census 250 million dollars of its 2022 budget. The census is planned to be completed in 2025 with an expected budget of US$153,700,453.

== Vital statistics ==
Registration of vital events in the Democratic Republic of the Congo is incomplete. The Population Department of the United Nations prepared the following estimates.

| Period | Population | Live births | Deaths | Natural change | CBR* | CDR* | NC* | TFR* | IMR* | Life expectancy |
|---|---|---|---|---|---|---|---|---|---|---|
| 1950 | 12,174,000 | 566,000 | 326,000 | 239,000 | 46.0 | 26.6 | 19.5 | 5.97 | 179.9 | 38.31 |
| 1951 | 12,415,000 | 579,000 | 328,000 | 251,000 | 46.1 | 26.2 | 20.0 | 5.97 | 178.5 | 38.44 |
| 1952 | 12,671,000 | 592,000 | 327,000 | 264,000 | 46.2 | 25.6 | 20.6 | 5.97 | 175.8 | 38.85 |
| 1953 | 12,937,000 | 607,000 | 329,000 | 278,000 | 46.4 | 25.1 | 21.2 | 5.98 | 173.3 | 39.14 |
| 1954 | 13,202,000 | 619,000 | 330,000 | 289,000 | 46.3 | 24.7 | 21.6 | 5.98 | 171.0 | 39.47 |
| 1955 | 13,484,000 | 632,000 | 333,000 | 299,000 | 46.3 | 24.4 | 21.9 | 5.98 | 168.8 | 39.72 |
| 1956 | 13,777,000 | 646,000 | 336,000 | 311,000 | 46.4 | 24.1 | 22.3 | 5.99 | 166.7 | 39.98 |
| 1957 | 14,084,000 | 663,000 | 338,000 | 325,000 | 46.5 | 23.7 | 22.8 | 6.01 | 164.7 | 40.32 |
| 1958 | 14,402,000 | 681,000 | 343,000 | 338,000 | 46.7 | 23.5 | 23.2 | 6.04 | 162.9 | 40.50 |
| 1959 | 14,714,000 | 698,000 | 348,000 | 349,000 | 46.8 | 23.4 | 23.4 | 6.07 | 161.2 | 40.64 |
| 1960 | 15,069,000 | 716,000 | 354,000 | 362,000 | 46.9 | 23.2 | 23.7 | 6.08 | 159.8 | 40.86 |
| 1961 | 15,460,000 | 738,000 | 370,000 | 368,000 | 47.1 | 23.6 | 23.5 | 6.11 | 159.6 | 40.24 |
| 1962 | 15,864,000 | 761,000 | 378,000 | 383,000 | 47.4 | 23.5 | 23.8 | 6.13 | 158.1 | 40.34 |
| 1963 | 16,287,000 | 785,000 | 385,000 | 400,000 | 47.5 | 23.3 | 24.2 | 6.16 | 156.5 | 40.60 |
| 1964 | 16,728,000 | 808,000 | 403,000 | 406,000 | 47.7 | 23.8 | 24.0 | 6.18 | 155.7 | 40.05 |
| 1965 | 17,183,000 | 833,000 | 404,000 | 429,000 | 47.9 | 23.2 | 24.7 | 6.21 | 153.1 | 40.70 |
| 1966 | 17,673,000 | 859,000 | 397,000 | 462,000 | 47.9 | 22.1 | 25.8 | 6.24 | 149.5 | 42.05 |
| 1967 | 18,191,000 | 885,000 | 405,000 | 480,000 | 48.0 | 21.9 | 26.0 | 6.27 | 147.3 | 42.31 |
| 1968 | 18,735,000 | 910,000 | 411,000 | 500,000 | 47.9 | 21.6 | 26.3 | 6.30 | 145.1 | 42.71 |
| 1969 | 19,290,000 | 935,000 | 418,000 | 517,000 | 47.8 | 21.4 | 26.4 | 6.32 | 142.7 | 42.98 |
| 1970 | 19,851,000 | 959,000 | 425,000 | 534,000 | 47.6 | 21.1 | 26.5 | 6.34 | 140.5 | 43.28 |
| 1971 | 20,424,000 | 985,000 | 431,000 | 554,000 | 47.5 | 20.8 | 26.8 | 6.38 | 138.3 | 43.66 |
| 1972 | 20,967,000 | 1,006,000 | 437,000 | 569,000 | 47.3 | 20.5 | 26.8 | 6.40 | 136.4 | 43.93 |
| 1973 | 21,535,000 | 1,026,000 | 445,000 | 582,000 | 47.0 | 20.4 | 26.6 | 6.41 | 134.7 | 44.10 |
| 1974 | 22,121,000 | 1,047,000 | 451,000 | 597,000 | 46.7 | 20.1 | 26.6 | 6.42 | 133.3 | 44.41 |
| 1975 | 22,717,000 | 1,070,000 | 460,000 | 610,000 | 46.4 | 20.0 | 26.4 | 6.42 | 132.1 | 44.47 |
| 1976 | 23,325,000 | 1,091,000 | 468,000 | 623,000 | 46.1 | 19.8 | 26.3 | 6.43 | 130.9 | 44.66 |
| 1977 | 23,923,000 | 1,111,000 | 476,000 | 634,000 | 45.8 | 19.6 | 26.1 | 6.43 | 129.8 | 44.76 |
| 1978 | 24,535,000 | 1,134,000 | 491,000 | 643,000 | 45.6 | 19.7 | 25.8 | 6.44 | 129.1 | 44.54 |
| 1979 | 25,450,000 | 1,184,000 | 496,000 | 688,000 | 45.9 | 19.2 | 26.7 | 6.46 | 126.9 | 45.21 |
| 1980 | 26,323,000 | 1,227,000 | 507,000 | 720,000 | 46.0 | 19.0 | 27.0 | 6.47 | 125.1 | 45.47 |
| 1981 | 27,099,000 | 1,260,000 | 517,000 | 744,000 | 45.9 | 18.8 | 27.1 | 6.49 | 123.5 | 45.72 |
| 1982 | 27,902,000 | 1,293,000 | 526,000 | 766,000 | 45.8 | 18.6 | 27.2 | 6.50 | 121.9 | 45.92 |
| 1983 | 28,774,000 | 1,333,000 | 535,000 | 798,000 | 45.9 | 18.5 | 27.5 | 6.55 | 120.3 | 46.18 |
| 1984 | 29,728,000 | 1,377,000 | 545,000 | 832,000 | 46.2 | 18.3 | 27.9 | 6.60 | 118.7 | 46.45 |
| 1985 | 30,763,000 | 1,433,000 | 559,000 | 873,000 | 46.5 | 18.2 | 28.4 | 6.65 | 117.4 | 46.62 |
| 1986 | 31,767,000 | 1,480,000 | 571,000 | 910,000 | 46.7 | 18.0 | 28.7 | 6.69 | 116.1 | 46.91 |
| 1987 | 32,763,000 | 1,529,000 | 579,000 | 950,000 | 46.8 | 17.7 | 29.1 | 6.74 | 114.9 | 47.34 |
| 1988 | 33,834,000 | 1,568,000 | 588,000 | 980,000 | 46.5 | 17.4 | 29.1 | 6.73 | 113.7 | 47.77 |
| 1989 | 34,931,000 | 1,610,000 | 596,000 | 1,014,000 | 46.3 | 17.1 | 29.1 | 6.74 | 112.6 | 48.17 |
| 1990 | 36,043,000 | 1,652,000 | 604,000 | 1,047,000 | 46.0 | 16.8 | 29.2 | 6.70 | 111.3 | 48.60 |
| 1991 | 37,325,000 | 1,713,000 | 617,000 | 1,097,000 | 46.1 | 16.6 | 29.5 | 6.69 | 110.1 | 48.95 |
| 1992 | 38,526,000 | 1,761,000 | 629,000 | 1,132,000 | 45.9 | 16.4 | 29.5 | 6.67 | 108.9 | 49.24 |
| 1993 | 39,932,000 | 1,804,000 | 638,000 | 1,165,000 | 45.7 | 16.2 | 29.5 | 6.64 | 108.1 | 49.55 |
| 1994 | 41,381,000 | 1,878,000 | 653,000 | 1,225,000 | 45.9 | 16.0 | 29.9 | 6.67 | 107.0 | 49.88 |
| 1995 | 43,873,000 | 2,046,000 | 682,000 | 1,364,000 | 47.1 | 15.7 | 31.4 | 6.71 | 105.7 | 50.41 |
| 1996 | 44,995,000 | 2,083,000 | 730,000 | 1,353,000 | 46.8 | 16.4 | 30.4 | 6.72 | 106.4 | 49.31 |
| 1997 | 45,598,000 | 2,067,000 | 707,000 | 1,360,000 | 45.8 | 15.7 | 30.2 | 6.73 | 103.7 | 50.40 |
| 1998 | 46,462,000 | 2,071,000 | 729,000 | 1,342,000 | 45.1 | 15.9 | 29.2 | 6.73 | 101.5 | 49.70 |
| 1999 | 48,133,000 | 2,128,000 | 739,000 | 1,389,000 | 45.0 | 15.6 | 29.4 | 6.72 | 99.5 | 49.95 |
| 2000 | 49,693,000 | 2,189,000 | 712,000 | 1,477,000 | 45.0 | 14.6 | 30.4 | 6.72 | 97.3 | 51.78 |
| 2001 | 51,322,000 | 2,245,000 | 721,000 | 1,525,000 | 44.8 | 14.4 | 30.4 | 6.70 | 95.0 | 52.12 |
| 2002 | 52,943,000 | 2,310,000 | 733,000 | 1,577,000 | 44.7 | 14.2 | 30.5 | 6.67 | 92.6 | 52.33 |
| 2003 | 54,558,000 | 2,372,000 | 738,000 | 1,634,000 | 44.5 | 13.9 | 30.7 | 6.64 | 89.9 | 52.83 |
| 2004 | 56,130,000 | 2,426,000 | 738,000 | 1,688,000 | 44.3 | 13.5 | 30.8 | 6.62 | 87.2 | 53.43 |
| 2005 | 57,865,000 | 2,499,000 | 743,000 | 1,757,000 | 44.2 | 13.1 | 31.1 | 6.60 | 84.6 | 53.93 |
| 2006 | 59,686,000 | 2,592,000 | 746,000 | 1,846,000 | 44.4 | 12.8 | 31.6 | 6.59 | 82.0 | 54.53 |
| 2007 | 61,546,000 | 2,675,000 | 756,000 | 1,920,000 | 44.4 | 12.5 | 31.8 | 6.58 | 79.4 | 54.92 |
| 2008 | 63,410,000 | 2,767,000 | 764,000 | 2,003,000 | 44.4 | 12.3 | 32.2 | 6.58 | 77.0 | 55.34 |
| 2009 | 65,372,000 | 2,867,000 | 771,000 | 2,096,000 | 44.6 | 12.0 | 32.6 | 6.59 | 74.5 | 55.84 |
| 2010 | 67,453,000 | 2,957,000 | 774,000 | 2,183,000 | 44.5 | 11.7 | 32.9 | 6.59 | 72.2 | 56.42 |
| 2011 | 69,674,000 | 3,069,000 | 776,000 | 2,293,000 | 44.7 | 11.3 | 33.4 | 6.58 | 70.0 | 57.07 |
| 2012 | 72,025,000 | 3,171,000 | 793,000 | 2,378,000 | 44.6 | 11.2 | 33.5 | 6.56 | 68.0 | 57.25 |
| 2013 | 74,484,000 | 3,247,000 | 797,000 | 2,450,000 | 44.2 | 10.9 | 33.4 | 6.53 | 65.9 | 57.76 |
| 2014 | 77,095,000 | 3,345,000 | 802,000 | 2,543,000 | 44.0 | 10.6 | 33.4 | 6.48 | 64.0 | 58.30 |
| 2015 | 79,712,000 | 3,433,000 | 818,000 | 2,615,000 | 43.6 | 10.4 | 33.2 | 6.44 | 62.2 | 58.49 |
| 2016 | 82,359,000 | 3,532,000 | 820,000 | 2,712,000 | 43.4 | 10.1 | 33.3 | 6.39 | 60.4 | 59.07 |
| 2017 | 85,554,000 | 3,647,000 | 832,000 | 2,815,000 | 43.3 | 9.9 | 33.4 | 6.35 | 58.6 | 59.41 |
| 2018 | 88,613,000 | 3,748,000 | 835,000 | 2,913,000 | 43.0 | 9.6 | 33.4 | 6.30 | 56.9 | 59.94 |
| 2019 | 91,482,000 | 3,839,000 | 844,000 | 2,995,000 | 42.7 | 9.4 | 33.3 | 6.25 | 55.5 | 60.28 |
| 2020 | 94,413,000 | 3,930,000 | 886,000 | 3,044,000 | 42.3 | 9.5 | 32.8 | 6.21 | 53.9 | 59.74 |
| 2021 | 97,567,000 | 4,158,000 | 930,000 | 3,163,000 | 41.9 | 9.4 | 31.9 | 6.16 | 52.0 | 60.0 |
| 2022 | 100,731,000 | 4,262,000 | 914,000 | 3,333,000 | 41.6 | 8.9 | 32.7 | 6.11 | 50.5 | 61.0 |
| 2023 | 104,063,000 | 4,370,000 | 902,000 | 3,453,000 | 41.3 | 8.5 | 32.8 | 6.05 | 49.3 | 61.9 |
| 2024 | | | | | 40.9 | 8.4 | 32.5 | 5.98 | | |
| 2025 | | | | | 40.4 | 8.3 | 32.1 | 5.90 | | |
*CBR = crude birth rate (per 1000 people); CDR = crude death rate (per 1000 people); NC = natural change (per 1000 people), also equals CBR minus CDR; IMR = infant mortality rate per 1000 births; TFR = total fertility rate (number of children per woman)

=== Population estimates by INS ===
The Institute of National Statistics of the DRC has provided population estimates from 1984 and 2000-2019:

- 1984: 30,631,000
- 2000: 52,099,000
- 2001: 53,870,000
- 2002: 55,702,000
- 2003: 57,596,000
- 2004: 59,554,000
- 2005: 61,579,000
- 2006: 63,673,000
- 2007: 65,837,000
- 2008: 68,076,000
- 2009: 70,391,000
- 2010: 72,784,000
- 2011: 75,259,000
- 2012: 77,817,000
- 2013: 80,462,000
- 2014: 83,197,000
- 2015: 86,024,000
- 2016: 88,957,000
- 2017: 91,994,000
- 2018: 94,921,000
- 2019: 98,370,000

=== Fertility ===
Total Fertility Rate (TFR) (Wanted Fertility Rate) and Crude Birth Rate (CBR) for urban and rural areas:

The Wanted Fertility Rate is an estimate of what the fertility rate would be if all unwanted births were avoided.

| Year | CBR (Total) | TFR (Total) | CBR (Urban) | TFR (Urban) | CBR (Rural) | TFR (Rural) |
|---|---|---|---|---|---|---|
| 2007 | 44.1 | 6.3 (5.6) | 40.4 | 5.4 (4.8) | 46.8 | 7.0 (6.2) |
| 2013–14 | 44.1 | 6.6 (5.7) | 40.5 | 5.4 (4.6) | 45.9 | 7.3 (6.5) |
| 2023–24 | 35.7 | 5.5 (4.8) | 30.4 | 4.2 (3.5) | 38.6 | 6.4 (5.7) |

Fertility data per province, as of 2014:

| Province | Total fertility rate | Percentage of women age 15-49 currently pregnant | Mean number of children ever born to women age 40–49 |
|---|---|---|---|
| Kinshasa | 4.2 | 5.7 | 4.8 |
| Bas-Congo | 6.0 | 12.6 | 6.5 |
| Bandundu | 6.3 | 12.1 | 6.1 |
| Équateur | 7.0 | 14.3 | 6.5 |
| Orientale | 5.9 | 11.6 | 5.3 |
| Nord-Kivu | 6.5 | 9.7 | 6.7 |
| Sud-Kivu | 7.7 | 12.5 | 7.4 |
| Maniema | 6.9 | 14.8 | 7.0 |
| Katanga | 7.8 | 12.8 | 7.3 |
| Kasaï Oriental | 7.3 | 12.4 | 7.5 |
| Kasaï Occidental | 8.2 | 14.2 | 7.5 |

| Years | 1925 | 1926 | 1927 | 1928 | 1929 |
|---|---|---|---|---|---|
| Total Fertility Rate in Democratic Republic of the Congo | 5.99 | 5.99 | 5.99 | 5.99 | 5.99 |

| Years | 1930 | 1931 | 1932 | 1933 | 1934 | 1935 | 1936 | 1937 | 1938 | 1939 |
|---|---|---|---|---|---|---|---|---|---|---|
| Total Fertility Rate in Democratic Republic of the Congo | 5.99 | 5.99 | 5.99 | 5.99 | 5.99 | 5.99 | 5.99 | 5.99 | 5.99 | 5.99 |

| Years | 1940 | 1941 | 1942 | 1943 | 1944 | 1945 | 1946 | 1947 | 1948 | 1949 |
|---|---|---|---|---|---|---|---|---|---|---|
| Total Fertility Rate in Democratic Republic of the Congo | 5.99 | 5.99 | 5.99 | 5.99 | 5.99 | 5.99 | 5.99 | 5.99 | 5.99 | 5.99 |

=== Life expectancy ===
Life expectancy in DR Congo since 1950

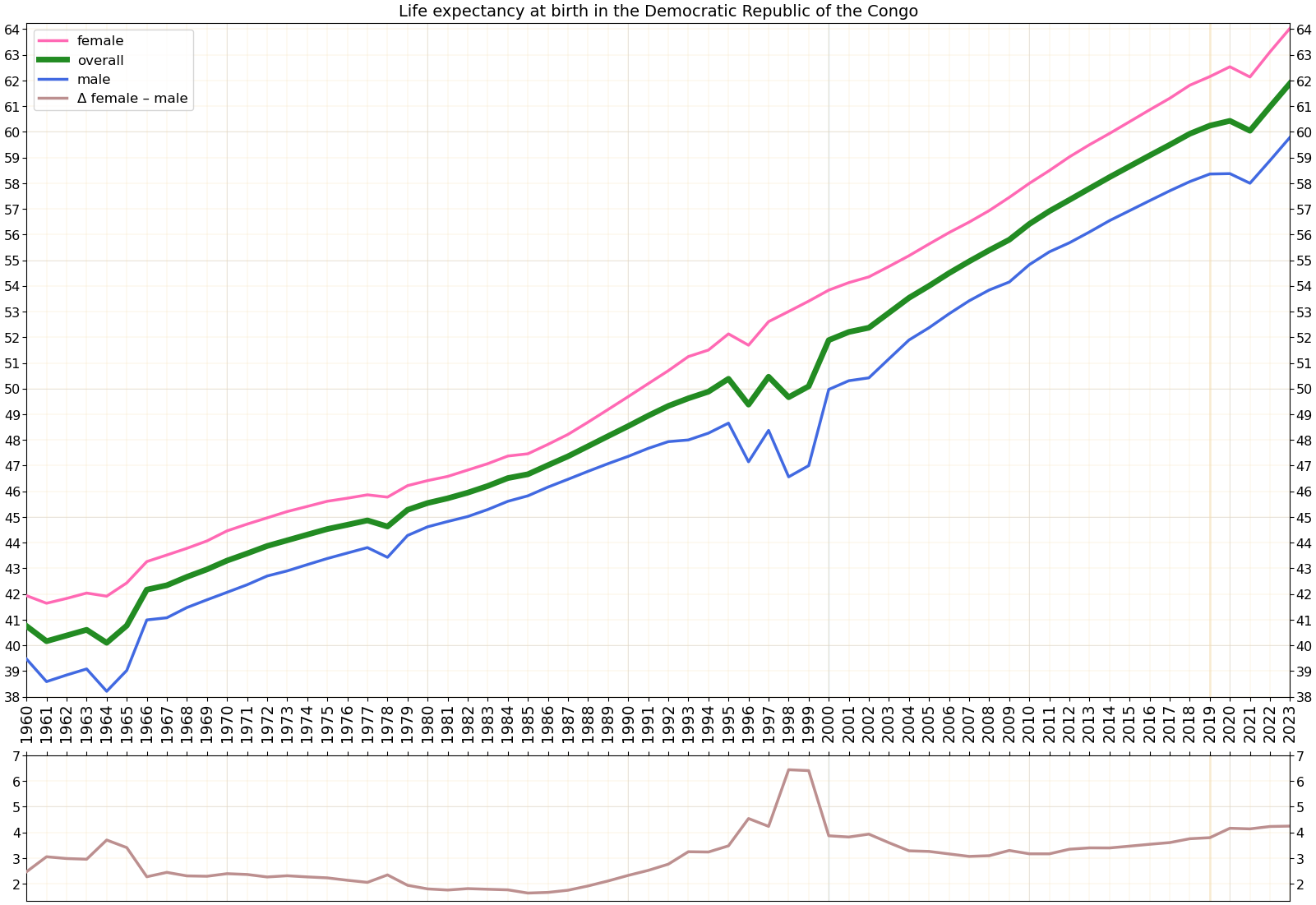
Life expectancy in DR Congo since 1960 by gender

| Period | Life expectancy in Years |
|---|---|
| 1950–1955 | 39.06 |
| 1955–1960 | ▲40.55 |
| 1960–1965 | ▲41.63 |
| 1965–1970 | ▲42.99 |
| 1970–1975 | ▲44.77 |
| 1975–1980 | ▲45.63 |
| 1980–1985 | ▲47.13 |
| 1985–1990 | ▲48.25 |
| 1990–1995 | ▲49.59 |
| 1995–2000 | ▼48.89 |
| 2000–2005 | ▲51.84 |
| 2005–2010 | ▲55.48 |
| 2010–2015 | ▲58.10 |

== Ethnic groups ==
Over 250 ethnic groups and 450 tribes (ethnic subgroups) populate the Democratic Republic of Congo. These ethnic groups are from the Bantu, Sudanic, Nilotic, Ubangian and Pygmy linguistic groups. There is no dominant ethnic group in Congo; the following ethnic groups account for 51.5% of the population:

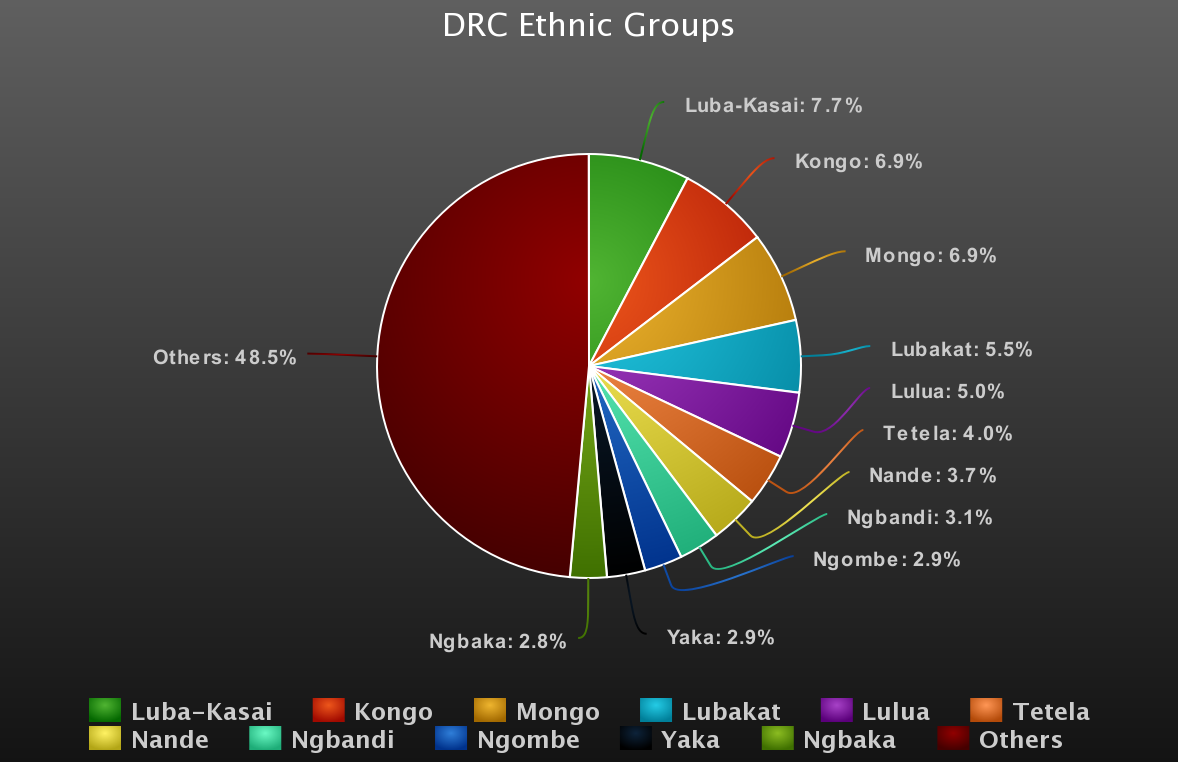
Breakdown of the largest ethnic groups in DRC

- Shi people
- Luba-Kasaï
- Kongo
- Mongo
- Lubakat
- Lulua
- Tetela
- Nande
- Ngbandi
- Ngombe
- Yaka
- Ngbaka

Ethnic groups include:

- Bantu peoples: Ambala, Ambuun, Angba, Babindi, Baboma, Baholo, Bangala, Bango, Bapindi, Batsamba, Bazombe, Bemba, Bembe, Bira, Bowa, Dikidiki, Dzing, Fuliru, Havu, Hema, Hima, Hunde, Iboko, Kanioka, Kaonde, Kongo, Kuba, Kumu, Kwango, Lengola, Lokele, Luba, Lunda, Lupu, Lwalwa, Mbala, Mbole, Mbuza (Budja), Mongo, Nande, Ngoli, Bangoli, Ngombe, Nkumu, Nyanga, Pende, Popoi, Poto, Sango, Shi, Nyindu, Songo, Sukus, Tabwa, Chokwe, Téké, Tembo, Tetela, Topoke, Ungana, Vira, Wakuti, Yaka, Yakoma, Yanzi, Yéké, Yela, etc.
- Central Sudanic: Manvu, Mbunja, Moru-Mangbetu, Lugbara
- Nilotic peoples: Alur, Bari, Kakwa, Logo
- Ubangian: Azande, Banda, Ngbandi, Ngbaka
- Pygmy peoples: Mbuti, Twa, Baka, Babinga

People of European descent (white) and Asian groups make up a significant part of the Democratic Republic of the Congo's migrant population. Most Europeans and Asians went to the country for temporary employment.

== Languages ==
| French | 79% |
| Lingala | 59% |
| Swahili | 40% |
| Kikongo | 17% |
| Tshiluba | 17% |
| English | 7% |
Percentage of the DRC population who speak each of the five national languages, plus English.

The five major languages in the DRC are French (official), Lingala (a lingua franca, or trade language), Swahili (more specifically Congo Swahili such as the Kingwana dialect), Kikongo ya leta or Kituba (a Kikongo-based creole language), and Tshiluba or Luba-Kasai. In total, there are over 200 languages spoken in the DRC.

French, the official language, is generally the language of instruction in schools. However, English is taught as a compulsory foreign language in secondary schools around the country. It is a required subject in the Faculty of Economics at major universities around the country, and there are numerous language schools in the country that teach it. Many Congolese, such as former president Joseph Kabila, are fluent in both English and French.

== Religion ==
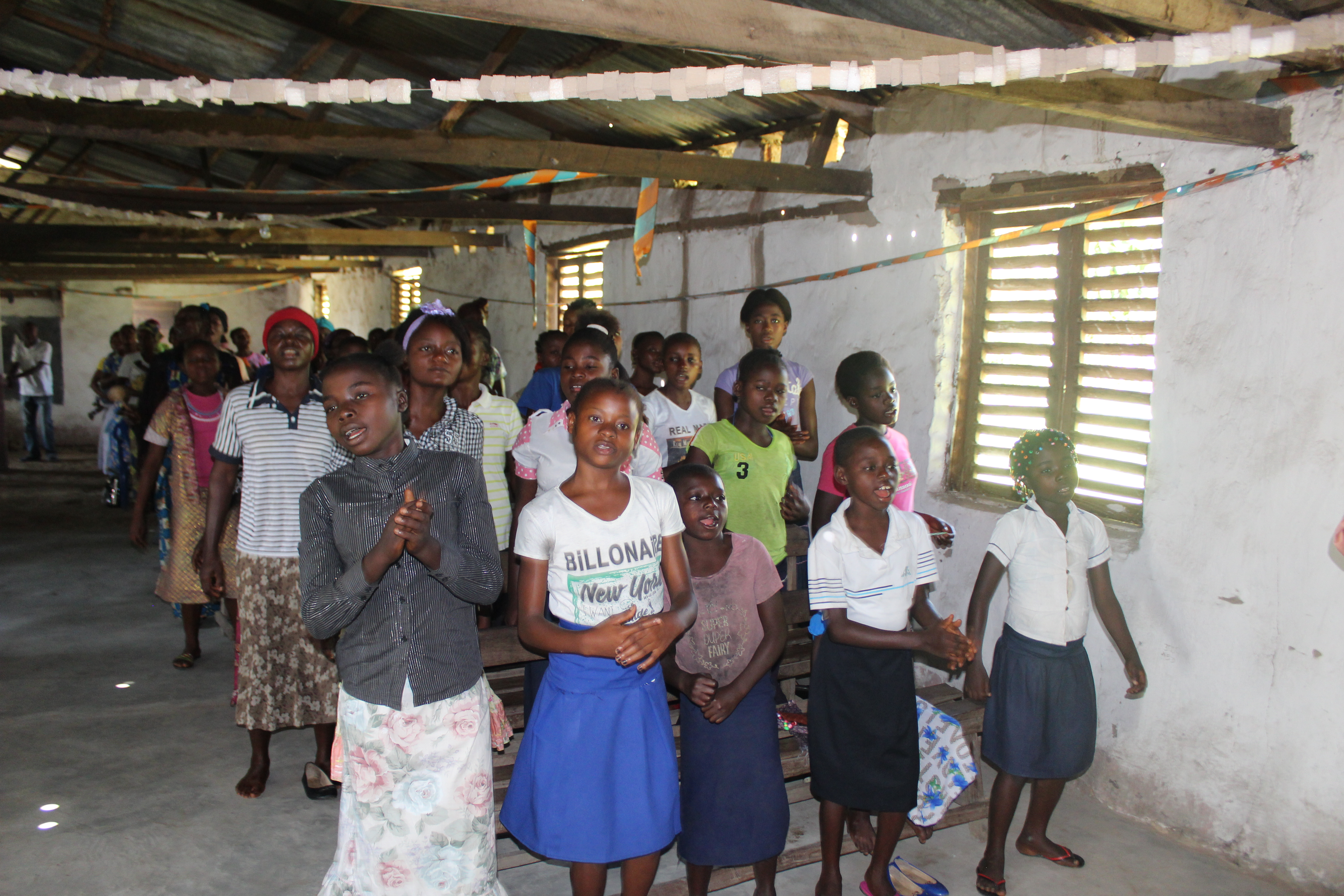
Christian church in Kisangani

A survey conducted by the Demographic and Health Surveys program in 2013–2014 indicated that Christians constituted 93.7% of the population (Catholics 29.7%, Protestants 26.8%, and other Christians 37.2%). An indigenous religion, Kimbanguism, was practiced by 2.8% of the population, while Muslims make up 1.2%.

Another estimate (by the Pew Research Center in 2010) found Christianity was followed by 95.8% of the population.

The CIA The World Factbook gives the following percentages: Roman Catholic 29.9%, Protestant 26.7%, Kimbanguist 2.8%, Other Christian 36.5%, Islam 1.3%, Other (includes Syncretic Sects and Indigenous beliefs) 2.7%.

Population, fertility rate and net reproduction rate, United Nations estimates

== Congolese diaspora ==
The table below shows DRC born people who have emigrated abroad in selected Western countries (although it excludes their descendants).

| Rank | Country | Region | Year | DRC born population |
|---|---|---|---|---|
| 1 | France | Europe | 2010 | 59,641 |
| 2 | Belgium | Europe | 2015 | 44,715 |
| 3 | Canada | North America | 2021 | 39,475 |
| 4 | United States | North America | 2011–13 | 20,410 |
| 5 | United Kingdom | Europe | 2011 | 19,193 |
| 6 | Germany | Europe | 2011 (foreign citizens) | 9,299 |
| 7 | Switzerland | Europe | 2011 | 6,724 |
| 8 | Italy | Europe | 2015 | 6,010 |
| 9 | Netherlands | Europe | 2015 | 4,973 |
| 10 | Sweden | Europe | 2015 | 3,092 |
| 11 | Brazil | South America | 2025 | 3,001 |
| 12 | Australia | Oceania | 2011 | 2,576 |
| 13 | Norway | Europe | 2015 | 2,210 |
| 14 | Spain | Europe | 2013 | 1,494 |
| 15 | Finland | Europe | 2015 | 1,523 |
| 16 | Denmark | Europe | 2015 | 1,264 |
| 17 | Austria | Europe | 2015 | 1,258 |

These are only estimates and do not account for Congolese migrants residing illegally in these and other countries. Among African countries, Congo's diaspora is second only to Nigeria in size.

== See also ==
Congolese ethnic groups:

- Alur
- Azande
- Chokwe
- Hema
- Kakwa
- Lendu
- Luba
- Mangbetu
- Twa
- Yaka
- Lunda

Other articles

- Health in the Democratic Republic of the Congo
