= Losengo language =

Bantu language spoken in Democratic Republic of Congo

Losengo
- Native to: Democratic Republic of the Congo
- Native speakers: (67,000 cited 1983–2002)
- Language family: Niger–Congo?: Atlantic–Congo; Benue–Congo; Bantoid; Bantu (Zone C); Bangi–Ntomba (C.30); Zamba–Binza; Losengo languages; Losengo

Language codes
- ISO 639-3: lse – inclusive code Individual codes: bkt – Boloki ndl – Ndolo
- Glottolog: luse1252 Lusengo ndol1238 Ndolo bolo1262 Boloki
- Guthrie code: C.36

Losengo (Lusengo) is a Bantu language spoken in the Democratic Republic of the Congo. It has had a significant effect on Lingala, the most important Bantu language in the two Congos.

Maho (2009) lists the following dialects:

- Poto (Pfoto), including Yakata
- Mpesa (Limpesa)
- Mbudza (cf. the related Budza language)
- Mangala (Ngala) [the name of the Bangi lingua franca that became Lingala]
- Loki (Boloki)
- Kangana
- Ndolo

(Yamongeri, however, is a variety of Mongo.)
