= Sambwakoy massacre =

2021 massacre in the Democratic Republic of the Congo

- Location: Sambwakoy and other villages, Bianga District, Monkoto Territory, Tshopo Province, Democratic Republic of the Congo
- Date: February 1–3, 2021
- Target: Iyeke villagers
- Deaths: 66
- Injuries: Dozens
- Perpetrator: Nkundo villagers

Between February 1 and 3, 2021, armed Nkundo villagers attacked Iyeke villagers in the Iyeke village of Sambwakoy, Tshopo Province, Democratic Republic of the Congo, killing 66 civilians.

== Background ==
In Monkoto territory in western DRC's Tshopo Province, long-standing tensions have existed between the Nkundo people and indigenous Iyeke people, part of the Twa people. The Iyeke and Nkundo live in separate but adjacent villages along a 100-kilometer stretch on the outskirts of Salonga National Park. These villages constitute Bianga district. In December 2020, a prominent trader in the village of Manga had received instructions to secure access to a large swath of mineral-rich land in the area. Following this, several Iyeke people were killed between December 2020 and January 2021 in a series of small attacks and assassinations.

On January 31, 2021, a small fight broke out between a Nkundo coffee trader and an Iyeke laborer over a debt in the village of Manga, with the trader vowing revenge.

== Massacre ==
On February 1, 2021, hundreds of armed Nkundo villagers stormed the village of Sambwakoy, wearing protective amulets and staining their faces with charcoal. Over a thousand houses in Sambwakoy were burned down, and the perpetrators shot sporadically at anyone in the village. Around 8,000 Iyeke people fled into the forest. Most of the displaced Iyeke remained in the forest for at least six months out of fear of being attacked again if they returned to their villages. At least 66 people were killed in the massacre, including 40 children, 33 of whom under the age of 10. At the time of the massacre, most of the parents and older siblings of the children were working in the fields, and the children were left in Sambwakoy defenseless.

Following the massacre at Sambwakoy, the Nkundo assailants attacked seven other Iyeke villages. Homes, churches, hospitals, and other community centers were torched, and many of the villagers were forced to flee into the forest. Some of those wounded during the attacks died of their wounds in the forest.

== Aftermath ==
The Congolese authorities had virtually no reaction to the massacre until February 16, when they deployed seven Congolese soldiers to the area with no transport or means of communication. Several men were arrested in connection with the killings on April 23, although a court in Boende dismissed the defendants without any witness testimony from survivors of the attack. The police commander of Bianga was known to be a leading perpetrator of the massacre, but his whereabouts remain unknown.
