= Zamba language =

Bantu language of DR Congo

Zamba
- Dzamba
- Native to: Democratic Republic of the Congo
- Language family: Niger–Congo?: Atlantic–Congo; Benue–Congo; Bantoid; Bantu (Zone C); Bangi–Ntomba (C.30); Zamba–Binza; Zamba

Language codes
- ISO 639-3: None (mis)
- Glottolog: zamb1245
- Guthrie code: C.322

Zamba (Dzamba) is a Bantu language spoken in the Democratic Republic of the Congo. Once considered a dialect of Bangi, Nurse (2003) places it closer to Lingala instead of Bangi.
