= Sakata =

Sakata may refer to:

== People ==
- Akira Sakata (born 1945), Japanese saxophonist
- Daisuke Sakata (born 1983), former American professional football player
- Jeanne Sakata, American actress and playwright
- Lenn Sakata (Lenn Haruki Sakata) (born 1954), former American professional baseball player
- Harold Sakata (Toshiyuki "Harold" Sakata) (1920–1982), American Olympic medalist, professional wrestler, and actor
- Sakata Eio (1920–2010), Japanese professional Go player
- Sakata Minoru (1902–1974), Japanese photographer
- Sakata no Kintoki, the Japanese folk hero Kintarō
- Sakata Tōjūrō, stage name taken on by a number of Kabuki actors
- Shoichi Sakata (Sakata Shōichi) (1911–1970), Japanese physicist
- Takefumi Sakata (born 1980), Japanese flyweight boxer

== Places ==
- Sakata, Yamagata, a city in Yamagata Prefecture, Japan
- Sakata District, Shiga, a district located in Shiga, Japan
- Sakata people, a tribe in the Black Water Province of the Democratic Republic of the Congo

== Fictional characters ==
- Nemuno Sakata, a character in Hidden Star in Four Seasons from the video game series Touhou Project

== Other ==
- Sakata language, a language of the Democratic Republic of the Congo
- Sakata, a brand of rice cracker sold by Smith's Australia
