= Mpama =

Mpama can refer to:

- Mpama language, Bantu language of the Democratic Republic of the Congo
- Mpama people, ethnic group of the Congo and Democratic Republic of the Congo
- Mpama River, tributary of the Alima in the Congo
