= Clarias monsembulai =

Scientific classification
- Domain: Eukaryota
- Kingdom: Animalia
- Phylum: Chordata
- Class: Actinopterygii
- Order: Siluriformes
- Family: Clariidae
- Genus: Clarias
- Species: C. monsembulai

Binomial name
- Clarias monsembulai Bernt and Stiassny, 2022
- Clarias monsembulai (Democratic Republic of the Congo)

Species of fish

Clarias monsembulai is a species of clariid catfish from the Congo Basin. It was named in honor of Raoul Monsembula Iyaba, a biology professor at the University of Kinshasa for collecting the type sample specimens and his contribution towards central African ichthyology. It has been described from a few rivers, namely Luilaka and Salonga, all near Salonga National Park.

== Habitat & distribution ==
According to its diagnosis paper, it is only currently known from the Momboyo, Luilaka, Salonga, and Yenge river systems, all within the Cuvette Centrale area of the middle Congo River Basin. It has been found in streams, both large and small, within this area.

== Characteristics ==
The holotype has been recorded at 226 mm (8.9 inches), with paratypes found downstream with a range of 127–244 mm (5–9.6 inches). It is currently distinguishable by the following characters (except for C. buthupogon):

- boasting exceptionally long maxilliary barbels (up to 60% SL

and from C. buthupogon from the following characters:

- not possessing fine pale spots over the body surface
- having an exposed cleithrum reaching up to one-eighth of the head length, as opposed to being deeply imbedded.

It is also distinguishable from C. angolensis, the clariid species possessing the closest phenotypic similarity by longer nasal, internal and external mandibular barbels, and also from barbel coloration, showing a creamy-white color over more than half the length. Other noticeable characters include:

- a broad head with a round snout
- a cylindrical body with a laterally compressed posterior edge
- 80–86 rays within the dorsal fin, anal fin 57–61 rays, pectoral fin consisting of 10–12 rays
- strong serration in both anterior and posterior margins of the pectoral fin

Preserved specimens have been known to be of brown color from upper view, fading to light brown, gray or cream approaching dorsal regions. Lighter-colored specimens have been known to possess a faint mottling of somewhat irregular, dark brown markings over a slightly lighter background. Fins are dark brown, in uniform. It also has a visible lateral line through a pattern of slight pores underneath the skin.
