= SZG =

SZG or szg may refer to:

- SZG, the Börse Frankfurt symbol for Salzgitter AG, a German manufacturing company
- SZG, the IATA code for Salzburg Airport, Austria
- szg, the ISO 639-3 code for Sengele language, Democratic Republic of the Congo
