= Loile River =

River in Democratic Republic of the Congo

- Location within Democratic Republic of the Congo

Location
- Country: Democratic Republic of the Congo
- Province: Tshuapa

Physical characteristics
- Mouth: Momboyo River
  - coordinates: 1.006°S 20.2964°E

The Loile River (French: Rivière Loile) is a tributary of the Momboyo River in the Democratic Republic of the Congo.

The Loile forms in the Salonga National Park and flows in the generally northwest direction to its confluence with the Luilaka. The Momboya forms to the southeast of the village of Waka, Equateur, just over the border in Tshuapa, where the Luilaka River is joined from the right by the Loile River at Bakako.

== Sources ==
- "Relation: Loile (2778227)", OpenStreetMap
