= Foto =

Foto may refer to:

- Fotö, an island and locality in Öckerö municipality, Västra Götaland county, Sweden
- Foto language, a Bantu language of the Democratic Republic of Congo
- Foto Strakosha (born 1965), an Albanian retired football goalkeeper
- Foto Çami (born 1925), a former Albanian politician
- To Lua Foto (died 614), Abbot of Clonmacnoise
- Fot, sometimes known as Foto, a runemaster in mid-11th century Sweden
- Forecasting Of Traffic Objects (FOTO), software tool for Three-phase traffic theory

== See also ==
- Photograph or photo, an image created by light falling on a light-sensitive surface
- Fotos, a German indie rock band
