= Lokoro River =

River in Democratic Republic of the Congo

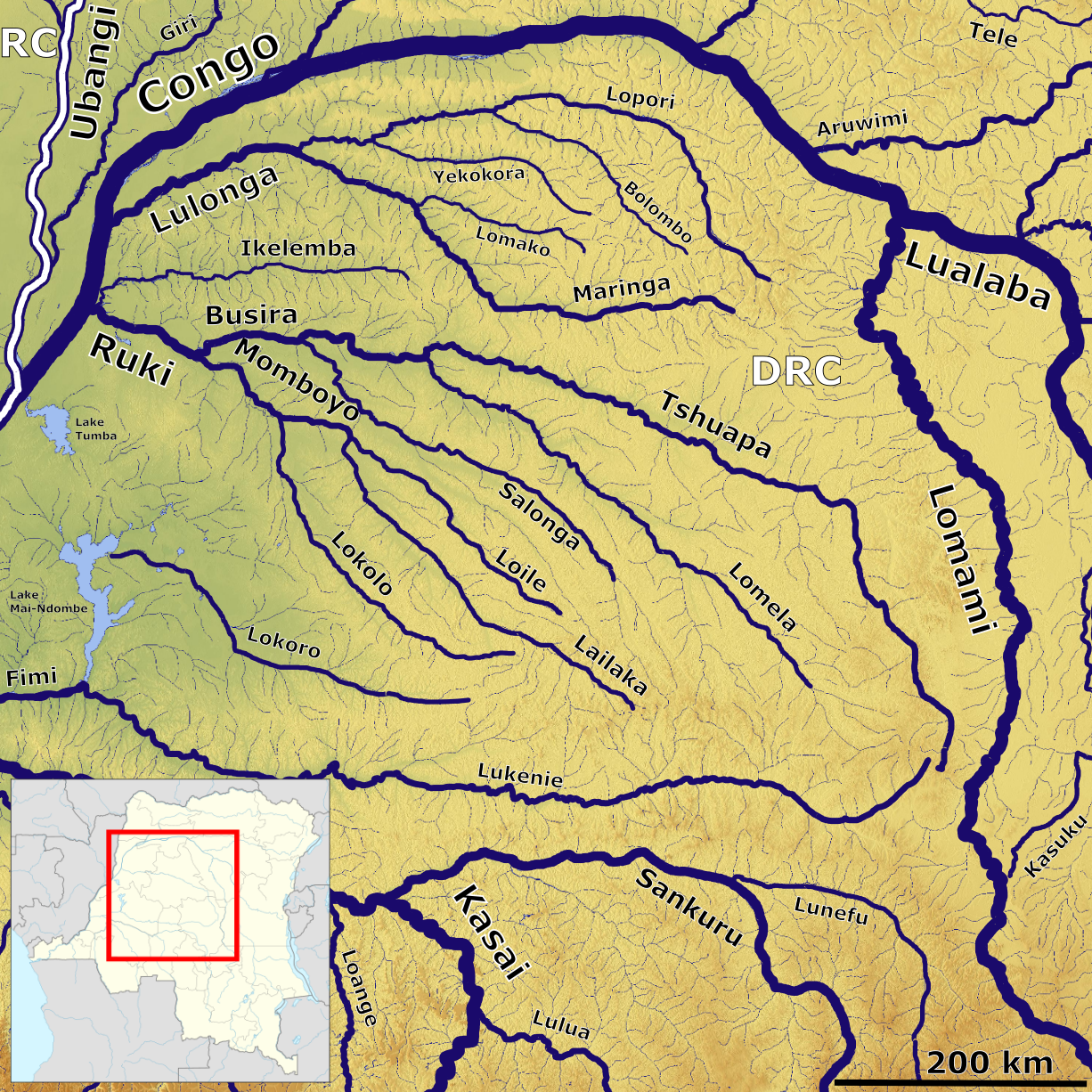
- The rivers of the central Democratic Republic of Congo with the Lokoro (left center)

Location
- Country: Democratic Republic of the Congo

Physical characteristics
- Mouth
  - location: Lake Mai-Ndombe
  - coordinates: 1.711381°S 18.455143°E

Basin features
- River system: Kasai River

The Lokoro River (French: Rivière Lokoro) is a river in the Democratic Republic of the Congo, one of the largest affluents of Lake Mai-Ndombe.

The river originates in the Dekese Territory, then flows west through the Lokolama sector of Oshwe Territory of Mai-Ndombe Province, then northwestward along the boundary between Kiri Territory and Inongo Territory to enter the northern part of Lake Mai-Ndombe. The river runs through extensive areas of permanent swamp forest. When the heavy rains begin in October the river floods and brings oxygenated water and nutrients into the swamp forests.

Near the upper Lokolo there is a great intercalary savanna named Ita. This seems to have been the location of a Bolia chiefdom at the end of the fourteenth century. The headwaters of the river are in the southern part of the Salonga National Park Most of the park is accessible only via river. The region in the south of the park that is occupied by the Iyaelima people is accessible via the Lokoro, which flows through the center, the Lokolo in the northern part and Lula in the south. This region has been the location for studies of Bonobos in the wild.

== Sources ==
- Blaes, X. (October 2008). "Découpage administratif de la République Démocratique du Congo" (PDF). UNOCHA and PNUD. Archived from the original (PDF) on 2010-04-01.
- Furuichi, Takeshi; Thompson, Jo Myers (2008). The bonobos: behavior, ecology, and conservation. Springer. ISBN 978-0-387-74785-9.
- Thieme, Michele L. (2005). Freshwater ecoregions of Africa and Madagascar: a conservation assessment. Island Press. ISBN 1-55963-365-4.
- Vansina, Jan (1990). Paths in the rainforests: toward a history of political tradition in equatorial Africa. Univ of Wisconsin Press. ISBN 0-299-12574-2.
