= Monkoto Airport =

Airport in DR Congo

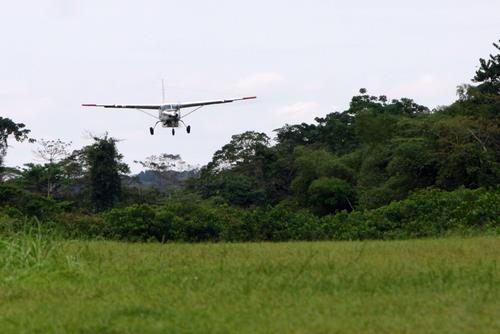
- A Mission Aviation Fellowship aircraft landing at Monkoto in 2005
- IATA: none; ICAO: FZGX

Summary
- Airport type: Public
- Serves: Monkoto
- Elevation AMSL: 1,282 ft / 391 m
- Coordinates: 1°43′20″S 20°41′25″E

Map
- Location of the airport in Democratic Republic of the Congo

Runways
Direction	Length		Surface
Direction	m	ft	Surface
11/29	1,400	4,593	Grass
- Sources: GCM HERE Maps

Monkoto Airport (ICAO: FZGX) is an airport serving the village of Monkoto in Tshuapa Province, Democratic Republic of the Congo.

== See also ==
- Transport in the Democratic Republic of the Congo
- List of airports in the Democratic Republic of the Congo
- Salonga National Park
