= Ambroise Boimbo =

Congolese citizen who snatched the King of Belgium's Sword

- Born: Monkoto, Tshuapa, Colonial Congo
- Died: 1981
- Burial place: Kintambo Cemetery, Kinshasa, Democratic Republic of the Congo
- Occupations: Electrician, former soldier
- Known for: Snatching King Baudouin of Belgium's ceremonial sword just before the Belgian Congo's independence

Ambroise Boimbo (died 1981) was a Congolese citizen who snatched the ceremonial sword of King Baudouin I of Belgium on June 29, 1960, in Léopoldville (now Kinshasa) on the eve of the independence of the Belgian Congo. He was a former soldier who originated from Monkoto, Tshuapa.

The king's entourage was driving from the airport into the city when it slowed to enable the monarch to stand and salute the flag of an honour guard of the Force Publique drawn up by the side of the road. A widely published photograph, taken by journalist Robert Lebeck, shows an exuberant Ambroise Boimbo, in jacket and tie, flourishing the sword while Baudouin and Congolese President Joseph Kasa-Vubu appear unaware of the incident. Further photographs taken by Lebeck show Boimbo encircled by Belgian and Congolese colonial gendarmes, as they wrestled him to the ground. According to media reports the "nationalist demonstrator" was taken away in a police vehicle but released later the same day at the king's request. The sword was apparently quickly retrieved and returned to King Baudouin, who was filmed wearing it at the Independence speech-making ceremonies the next day on June 30.

Ambroise Boimbo subsequently worked as an electrician. He died in 1981 and is interred at the Kintambo cemetery.

== Legacy ==
To some commentators the seizure of the sword symbolized the real independence of the Congo, although others saw it as simply an instance of high-spirited behavior at a time of celebration.

A small Belgian film crew travelled to the Congo in 2009 and 2010 to document their search for Boimbo, releasing a documentary, Boyamba Belgique, or, Why a king should not lose his sword.

South African artist Mary Sibande noted an interest in Boimbo's motivations in a 2019 interview.
