= Binza language =

Bantu language in the Congo

Binza
- Libinza
- Native to: Democratic Republic of the Congo
- Region: Ngiri and Mwanda rivers
- Native speakers: (10,000 cited 1986)
- Language family: Niger–Congo?: Atlantic–Congo; Benue–Congo; Bantoid; Bantu (Zone C); Bangi–Ntomba (C.30); Zamba–Binza; Binza

Language codes
- ISO 639-3: liz
- Glottolog: libi1244
- Guthrie code: C321

Binza (Binja) is a Bantu language spoken in the Democratic Republic of the Congo.
