= Momboyo River =

River in Democratic Republic of the Congo

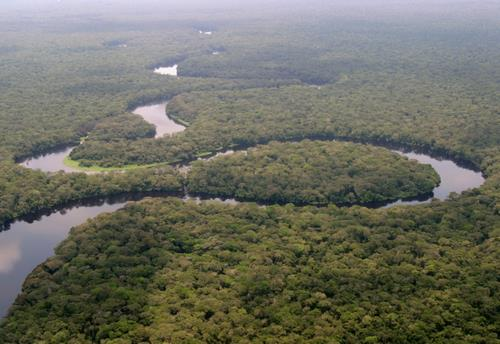
- The Luilaka River, the main tributary of the Momboyo, in Salonga National Park

- Mouth location in the Democratic Republic of the Congo

Location
- Country: Democratic Republic of the Congo

Physical characteristics
- Source
  - location: Waka
  - coordinates: 1.00745°S 20.29525°E
- Mouth: Ruki River
  - coordinates: 0.343048°S 19.008223°E
- Length: 227 kilometres (141 mi)

Basin features
- River system: Ruki River
- Tributaries
  - left: Luilaka River, Lokolo River, Dwali River
  - right: Loile River

The Momboyo River (French: Rivière Momboyo) is a river in the Democratic Republic of the Congo. It joins the Busira River to form the Ruki River, a tributary of the Congo River. The Momboya and its main tributary the Luilaka are navigable for 545 kilometres (339 mi) from its mouth.

== Location ==
The Momboya and its main tributary the Luilaka are sometimes treated as one river. The lower 227 kilometres (141 mi) is called the Momboyo, and above this it is called Luilaka.| The Momboya proper forms to the southeast of the village of Waka, Equateur, just over the border in Tshuapa, where the Luilaka River is joined from the right by the Loile River at Bakako. It flows with many meanders in a generally northwest direction to its confluence with the Busira River. It joins the Busira River from the left above Ingende to form the Ruki River, which flows for 100 miles (160 km) in a west-northwest direction to join the Congo River. There are 25,000 hectares (62,000 acres) of swamps on the Momboyo before it joins the Busira.

== Navigation ==
The combined Momboyo–Luilaka river is navigable for 545 kilometres (339 mi) from its mouth up to Ikali. From its mouth up to Kassa, at 119 kilometres (74 mi) the river is accessible to “C” type tugs pulling a 350 tonne barge. Above this "G" mailboats can push four barges up to Monkoto at 407 kilometres (253 mi) from the mouth. Further up, "G" mailboats can push two barges up to Ikali at 545 kilometres (339 mi) from the mouth. During low water periods the river may be navigable only as far as Isaka at 460 kilometres (290 mi) from its mouth, or only as far as Monkoto.

== Human presence ==
The villages located along the river supply Mbandaka with various food products, the most important being cassava chips, corn and palm oil. The river waters are polluted by discharge from public markets along the riverside. This results in water-borne diseases such as diarrhea in the surrounding population. In 2008 cases of monkeypox were reported in Ingende at the foot of the river and in Boteka, on the Momboya. The disease is mainly caused in humans by consumption of monkey and squirrel meat.

== 2018 boat accident ==
In May 2018 fifty people died when a motorized boat sank during a night voyage on the upper part of the river. About fifty were saved. The boat was overloaded, and was travelling at night without lights from the village of Monkoto towards Mbandaka It sank 1 kilometre (0.62 mi) from Wafanya. (Note: Monkoto and Wafanya, where the accident occurred, are on the Lwilaka or Luilaka River, the main tributary of the Momboyo. The Luilaka is often called the Momboyo) The accident was caused when the Baleinière, a large wooden boat, collided with a log. The strong current would have quickly swept the boat away. Accidents such as this are common on the Congo waterways due to overloading of boats that are in poor condition, combined with lack of life jackets and many passengers who cannot swim.

== Sources ==
- Bosiyo Jean Clement, Protection de la diversité biologique des eaux de la rivière Momboyo à Ingende (in French), GEF Small Grants Programme
- "Congo : 50 morts dans un naufrage sur la rivière Momboyo", Le Parisien (in French), 25 May 2018
- Hughes, R. H. (1992), A Directory of African Wetlands, IUCN, ISBN 978-2-88032-949-5
- Lederer, A. (1973), L'exploitation des affluents du Zaïre et des ports de l'intérieur de 1960 à 1971 (PDF) (in French), Académi e royal e des Sciences d'Outre-Mer: Classe des Sciences Techniques, N.S., XVII-6, Bruxelles
- "RDC: 50 morts dans le naufrage d'une embarcation dans le Nord-Ouest", RFI (in French), 25 May 2018
- Regine Kiala (1 July 2008), "Equateur : Monkey Pox, 470 cas dont 22 décès à Mbandaka", Le potentiel (in French), Congo-Kinshasa
- "République démocratique du Congo : 50 morts dans un naufrage", La Provence (in French), 25 May 2018
- "Ruki River", Encyclopaedia Britannica
- "Relation: Momboyo (2100506)", OpenStreetMap
