= Mbompo language =

Bantu language of Kasai, DR Congo

Mbompo
- Native to: Democratic Republic of Congo
- Region: Ubangi River
- Native speakers: (3,000 cited 2000)
- Language family: Niger–Congo?: Atlantic–Congo; Benue–Congo; Bantoid; Bantu (Zone C); Bangi–Ntomba (C.30); Bangi–Moi; Mbompo

Language codes
- ISO 639-3: None (mis)
- Glottolog: None
- Guthrie code: C.351

Mbompo (Mpombo) is a Bantu language of Kasai, Democratic Republic of Congo. Nurse (2003) places it among the Bangi–Moi languages.
