= Mongo people =

Ethnic group in Central Africa

Mongo
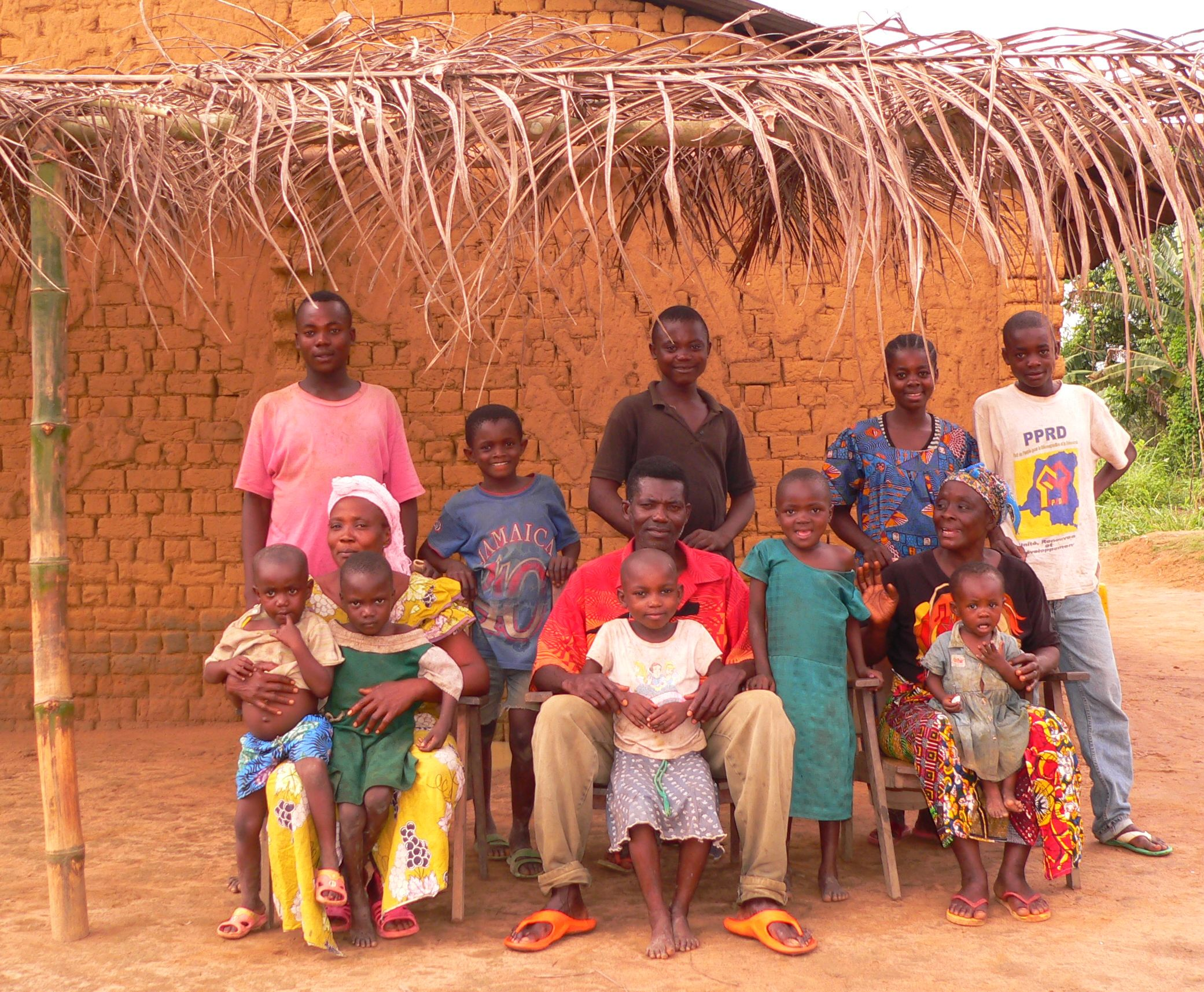
- Mongo family from Equateur Province in 2007

Regions with significant populations
- DRC

Languages
- Mongo, Lingala, French

Related ethnic groups
- other Bantu peoples

Mongo
- People: Bomongo
- Language: Lomongo, Nkundo

The Mongo people are an ethnic group who live in the equatorial forest of Central Africa. They are the largest ethnic group in the Democratic Republic of Congo, highly influential in its north region. The Mongo people are a diverse collection of sub-ethnic groups who are referred to as AnaMongo. The Mongo (Anamongo) subgroups include the Mongo, Batetela, Bakusu (Benya Samba/ Benya lubunda), Ekonda, Bolia, Nkundo, Iyadjima, Ngando, Ndengese, Sengele, Sakata, Mpama, Ntomba, Mbole. The Mongo (Anamongo) occupy 14 provinces particularly the province of Equateur, Tshopo, Tshuapa, Mongala, Kwilu, in Maï Ndombe, Kongo-Centrale, in Kasai, in Sankuru, Maniema, North Kivu and South Kivu, Tanganiyka (Katanga) and Ituri province. Their highest presence is in the province of Équateur and the northern parts of the Bandundu Province (Maï Ndombe).

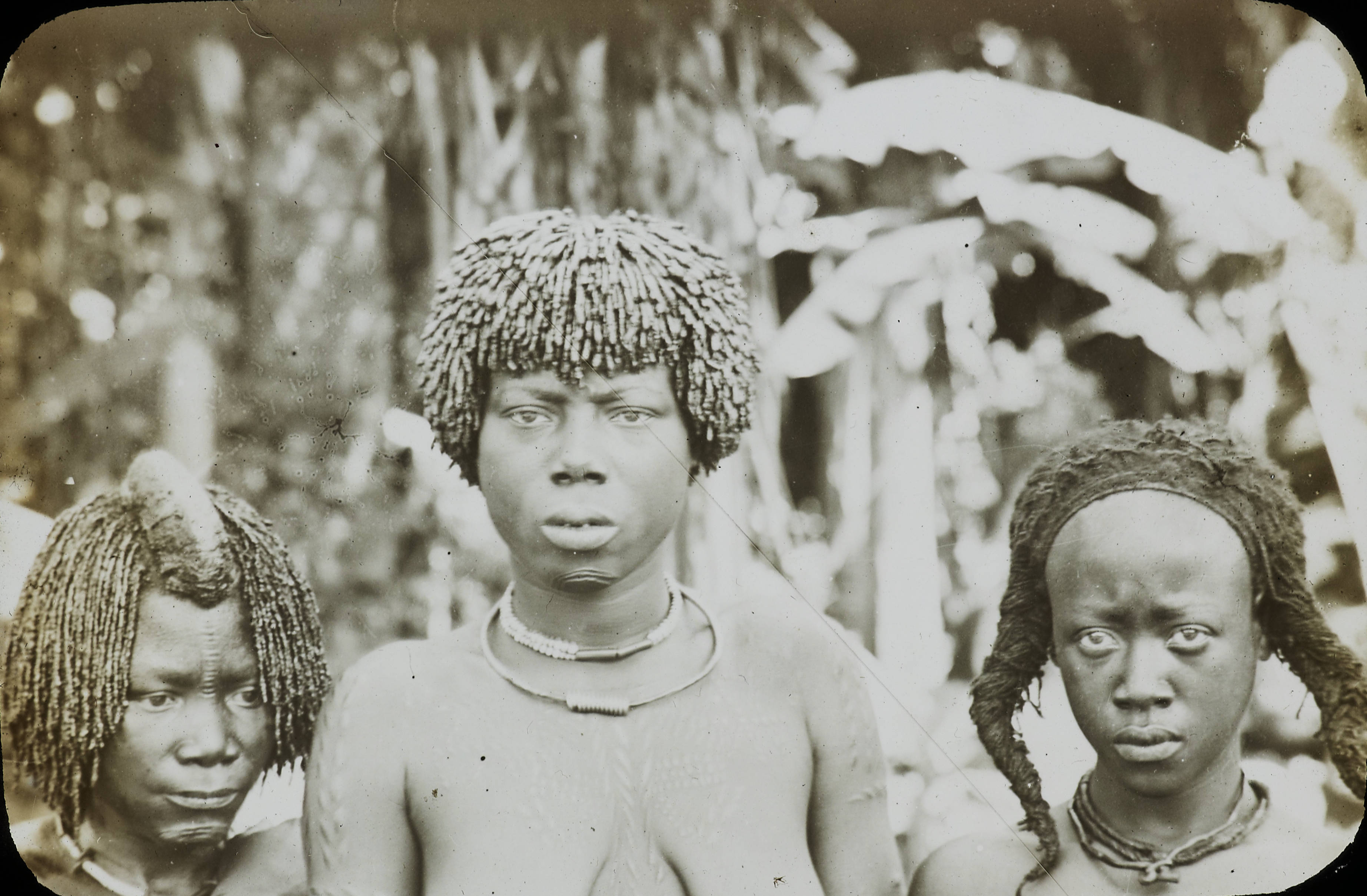
Early 20th century photo of three women taken in Mongo lands Equator province. “Balolo Mission”

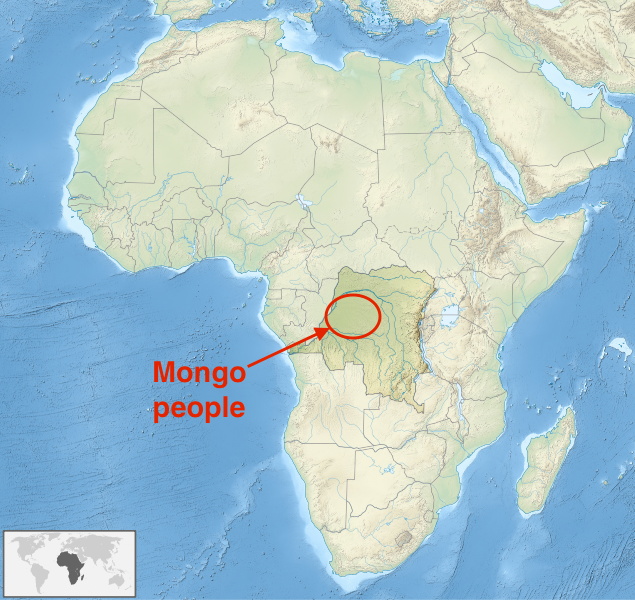
Origins of the Mongo people (approx).

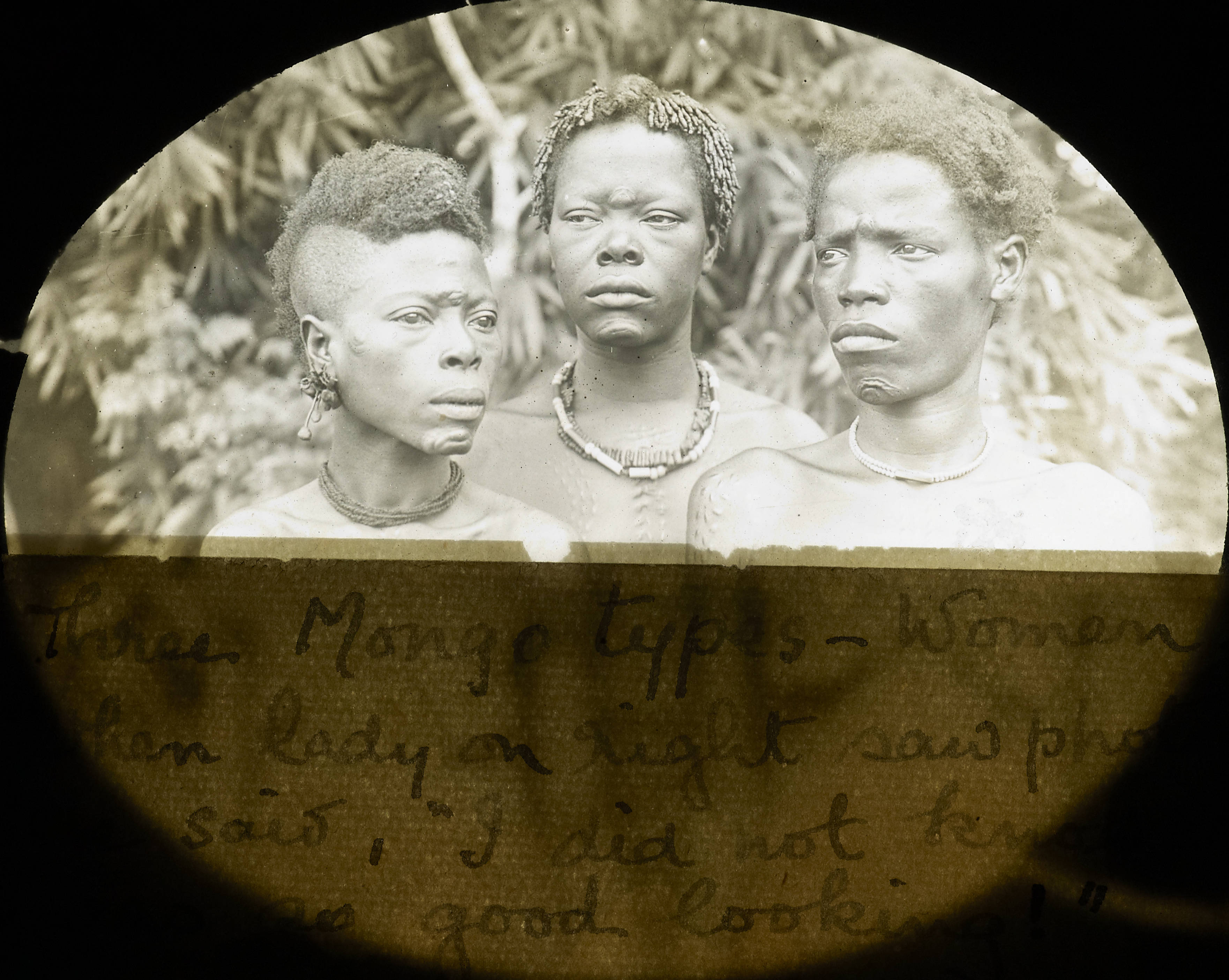
Three Mongo women, c. 1900–1915

The Mongo people, despite their diversity, share a common legend wherein they believe that they are the descendants of a single ancestor named Mongo. Historically the term “Bangala” had been imposed on the Mongo people to such consistency various groups of Mongo origin accept this term without regard to the historical origins of the term “Bangala.” Political scientist M. Crawford Young has written that the term "Bangala" is an artificial construct rather than a natural sociographic grouping. Mongo people also share similarities in their language and social organization, but also have differences. Anthropologists first proposed the Mongo unity as an ethnic group in 1938 particularly by Boelaert, followed by a major corpus on Mongo people in 1944 by Vanderkerken – then the governor of Équateur.

The Mongo people traditionally speak the Mongo language (also called Nkundo). The Lingala language, however, often replaces Mongo in urban centers. This language has about 200 dialects, and these are found clustered regionally as well as based on Mongo sub-ethnic groups such as Bolia, Bokote, Bongandu, Ekonda, Iyaelima, Konda, Mbole, Mpama, Nkutu, Ntomba, Sengele, Songomeno, Dengese, Tetela-Kusu, Bakutu, Boyela.

== History ==
The historical roots of the Mongo people are unclear, but they probably settled along the rainy, hot, and humid river valleys of northern and western Congo in the early centuries of the 1st millennium. Farming of staples such as yam and banana was likely established by about 1000 CE. The Belgian colonial rule impacted the traditions, culture and religious beliefs of the Mongo people, and they predominantly converted to one of the numerous denominations of Christianity found in Congo. The influence of Islamic missionary activity from northern Africa has been a source of deep resentment for the Christian Mongo people, leading to a history of conflicts between them and some Muslim ethnic groups found in the neighboring northeastern regions of Congo.

According to Alexander Reid, the Mongo people suffered during the active slave capture, trade, and export in the 18th and 19th centuries, where "thousands of Mongo people as captured slaves passed through the Zanzibar route by the Arabs". A system of enslavement and slave trade led by Arab incursions, state Patrick Harries and David Maxwell, existed and impacted the Mongo people before the colonial period. The arrival of Belgium as a colonial ruler, with its Leopoldian exploitation model, combined with imported diseases such as sleeping sickness and syphilis, decimated the Mongo people over the colonial history. The colonial period also brought an ecological and economic change from the introduction of cocoa, coffee, and rubber plantations as well as the trapping of animals as pets and for zoos.

== Society and culture ==
Given the equatorial forests they live in, like neighboring ethnic groups, the Mongo people cultivate cassava, yam and banana as staple foods. This is supplemented with wild-plant and edible-insects gathering, seasonal vegetables and beans, fishing, and hunting. The society is patrilineal, and traditionally based on a joint family household called Etuka with twenty to forty members, derived from an ancestor lineage. The male elder of the Etuka is called Tata (meaning father). A cluster of Etuka form a village of the Mongo people. Disputes and covenants between lineages were typically resolved through goods or inter-marriages. Some sub-ethnic groups found in the southern parts of Congo have had a chief, instead of being a collection of lineages, with the chief known as Bokulaka.

Traditional religion of the Mongo people is largely one of ancestor worship, belief in nature spirits, fertility rites, with shamanic practices such as magic, sorcery, and witchcraft. Mongo artistic achievements, songs, musical instruments and carvings show richness and high sophistication. Like many ancient cultures, the Mongo people have used the oral tradition, including Mongo proverbs and fables, to preserve and transmit knowledge to the next. In the early 1970s, Mabel Ross, a Christian missionary, collected 95 traditional stories from Nkundo storytellers in what was then Zaire; the stories were published in English translation in 1979 in the book On Another Day: Tales Told among the Nkundo of Zaire. Polygamy has been a part of the Mongo culture into the modern age, though missionaries have attempted to curb this part after their conversion to Christianity.

The musician Jupiter Bokondji is of Mongo descent.

== See also ==
- Belgian colonial empire
- Slavery in Africa
- Zebola
