= Ndolo dialect =

Language

Ndolo
- Native to: Democratic Republic of the Congo
- Native speakers: (8,000 cited 1983 census)
- Language family: Niger–Congo?: Atlantic–Congo; Benue–Congo; Bantoid; Bantu (Zone C); Bangi–Ntomba (C.30); Zamba–Binza; Losengo; Ndolo

Language codes
- ISO 639-3: ndl
- Glottolog: ndol1238
- Guthrie code: C.36g

Ndolo is a Bantu language spoken in the Democratic Republic of the Congo by 8,000 people. It is very close to Lingala.
