= Foto language =

Bantu language of the Democratic Republic of Congo

Foto
- Bafoto
- Native to: DR Congo
- Extinct: by 2001
- Language family: Niger–Congo?: Atlantic–Congo; Benue–Congo; Bantoid; Bantu (Zone C); Mongo or Soko; Foto

Language codes
- ISO 639-3: None (mis)
- Glottolog: bafo1235
- Guthrie code: C.611

Foto (Bafoto) is an extinct Bantu language of the Democratic Republic of Congo. Malcolm Guthrie classified it close to Mongo. However, Mongo and its closest relatives were split between the Bangi–Ntomba and Soko–Kele branches of Bantu in Nurse (2003), and it is not clear where Foto belongs.
