= Bangi–Ntomba languages =

Group of Bantu languages

Bangi–Ntomba
- Bangi–Mongo
- Geographic distribution: Central reaches of the Congo River and adjacent areas
- Linguistic classification: Niger–Congo?: Atlantic–Congo; Benue–Congo; Southern Bantoid; Bantu (Zone C.30); Bangi–Tetela?; Bangi–Ntomba
- Subdivisions: Zamba–Binza; Bangi–Moi; Sakata; Mongo (Bolia)

Language codes
- ISO 639-3: –

The Bangi–Ntomba languages are a group of Bantu languages spoken in the Democratic Republic of Congo and the Republic of the Congo. They are coded Zone C.30 in Guthrie's classification, and included the trade language Lingala, one of four national languages of the DRC and two of the RC.

According to Nurse & Philippson (2003), apart from the Ngiri languages (to Ngondi–Ngiri) and Budza (Buja), and together with a few additional languages such as Mongo-Nkundu, they form a valid node. Using Guthrie's listing, they are:

- Zamba–Binza: Losengo (Losengo, Loki/Boloki, Ndolo), Binza, Dzamba (Zamba)
- Bangi–Moi: Bangi, Mbompo (Mpombo), Moi, Mpama (Pama), (C20) Kuba
- Sakata
- Mongo: Sengele, Ntomba-Bolia, (C60) Mongo (Nkundo) (?Bafoto), (C70) Kela

Lingala and Bangala developed as trade languages, primarily on a Bangi lexical base.
