= Bangi language =

Bantu language spoken in Congo and DRC

Bangi
- Bobangi
- Native to: Republic of Congo, Democratic Republic of the Congo
- Native speakers: (120,000 cited 2000)
- Language family: Niger–Congo?: Atlantic–Congo; Volta-Congo; Benue–Congo; Bantoid; Southern Bantoid; Bantu (Zone C); Bangi–Ntomba; Bangi–Moi; Bangi
- Dialects: Moi; Liku; Rebu; Derived languages: Lingala; Bangala

Language codes
- ISO 639-3: Either: bni – Bangi mow – Moi
- Glottolog: bang1354 Bobangi moic1236 Moi
- Guthrie code: C.32

The Bangi language, or Bobangi, is a relative and main lexical source of Lingala spoken in central Africa. Dialects of the language are spoken on both sides of the Ubangi and the Congo rivers.

== Phonology ==
=== Consonants ===
| | | Labial | Alveolar | | Palatal | Velar |
| | | Labial | plain | sibilant | Palatal | Velar |
|---|---|---|---|---|---|---|
| Nasal | | m | n | | ɲ | |
| Plosive/ Affricate | voiceless | p | t | ts | | k |
| Plosive/ Affricate | voiced/imp. | ɓ~b | | (dz) | | |
| Plosive/ Affricate | prenasal vl. | ᵐp | ⁿt | ⁿts | | ᵑk |
| Plosive/ Affricate | prenasal vd. | ᵐb | ⁿd | ⁿdz | | ᵑɡ |
| Fricative | voiceless | | | s | | |
| Fricative | voiced | | | z | | |
| Fricative | prenasal | | | ⁿs | | |
| Approximant | | w | l | | j | |

- /ɓ/ may also be pronounced as [b].
- Sounds /z, ⁿs/ can have allophones of [dz, ⁿts] in free variation.

=== Vowels ===
| | Front | Central | Back |
|---|---|---|---|
| Close | i | | u |
| Close-mid | e | | o |
| Open-mid | ɛ | | ɔ |
| Open | | a | |

== Use in trade ==
As the Bobangi people came to dominate the slave trade along the upper Congo River in the late 18th century, the Bangi language was used to facilitate trade between different ethnic groups in the region. Linguist John Whitehead claimed that the Moye, Likuba, Bonga, Mpama, Lusakani, and Bangala (peuple) peoples all used Bangi for intercommunication in the 1890s. At the height of indigenous trade along the upper river, the Bobangi dominated the 500 kilometer section of the Congo between the Kwah River and the equator, which most river trade passed through. Other ethnic groups in this area were either assimilated into the Bobangi ethnic alliance, adopting the Bangi language, or were driven off. However, the Bobangi dominance over trade was ended by Europeans in the late 19th century when colonial powers pushed local indigenous groups out of the profitable trade. By the late twentieth century, there were very few Bobangi people remaining in the area they had controlled a century earlier, and the Bangi language is no longer widespread.

== Sources and references ==
- Linguistic map
- Webresources for Bantu languages
