= Sakata people =

The Sakata people, or Basakata, are one of the Bantu peoples of Central Africa, and in the Democratic Republic of the Congo. They are indigenous to the Mai-Ndombe Province, formerly part of Bandundu Province. They speak the Sakata language, and Lingala as their lingua franca. The Sakata are a sub-group of the Mongo ethnic group.
