= Zebola =

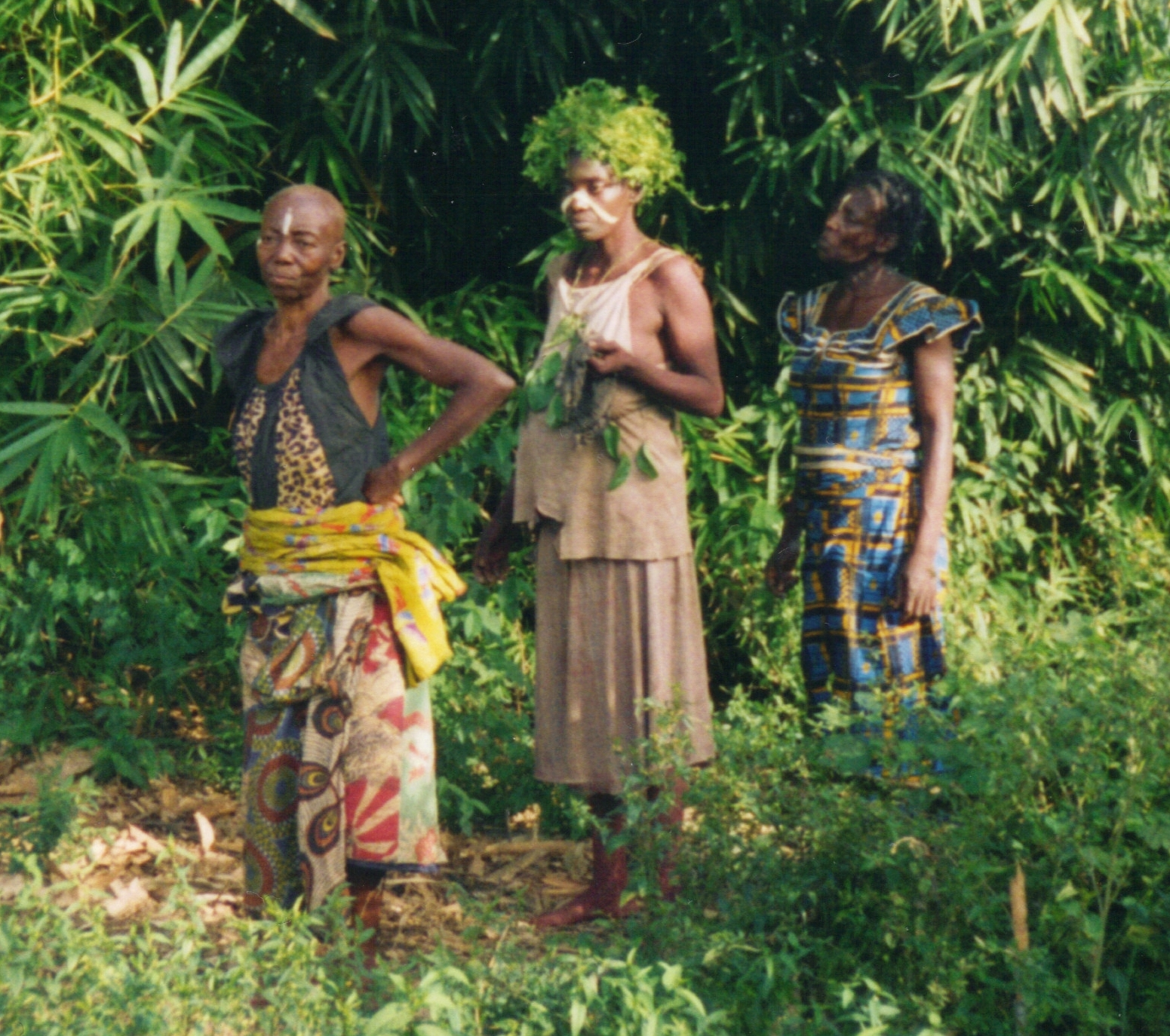
Jebola: in the village of Baringa, Equateur Province, DRC

Zebola, also, Jebola, is a women's spirit possession dance ritual practised by certain ethnic groups of the Democratic Republic of the Congo. It is believed to have therapeutic qualities and has been noted in the West as a traditional form of psychotherapy.

It originated among the Mongo people but is also practised among various ethnic groups in Kinshasa.
