= Iyaelima people =

Total population
- 2,500

Regions with significant populations
- Salonga National Park: 2,500

Related ethnic groups
- Mongo, Anamongo

Iyaelima people are an ethnic group with a population of about 2,500 that live in eight settlements in the southern part of the Salonga National Park (SNP) in the Democratic Republic of the Congo. They belong to the Mongo group of Bantu peoples. Although they practice slash-and-burn agriculture and hunt for bushmeat, they have little impact on the environment. The Iyaelima never kill bonobos, an ape closely related to humans whose population is much higher in Iyaelima territory than elsewhere.

== Location ==
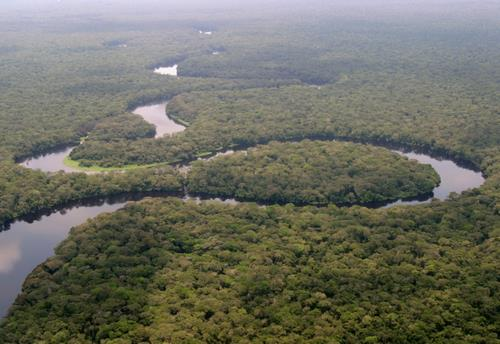
Lulilaka River in the Salonga National Park

The Salonga National Park was established as the Tshuapa National Park in 1956, and gained its present boundaries with a 1970 presidential decree by President Mobutu Sese Seko. It was registered as a UNESCO World Heritage Site in 1984. Most of the Salonga National Park is accessible only via river. The region in the southwest of the park occupied by the Iyaelima is accessible via the Lokoro River, which flows through the center. The Lokolo River defines the northern boundary and Lula River the south.

When the SNP was established, most of the inhabitants were expelled but the Iyaelima managed to remain. The Iyaelima had gained a reputation as ferocious warriors, which they were careful to cultivate. They were allowed to stay under a law that categorizes them as "wildlife".

The park structure is based on the American National Park model in which wilderness areas are cleared of their indigenous inhabitants. The World Wildlife Fund (WWF) has been pressing to do the same with the Iyaelima, the last remaining residents of the SNP. The Iyaelima are hostile to the park, to Institut Congolais pour la Conservation de la Nature (ICCN) personnel who manage it and to the park guards. They have not been informed of park laws, for example prohibiting trade in wild animals, and mainly interact with ICCN personnel over legal problems. Only one of the Iyaelima is employed by the park.

== Society ==
The Iyaelima are patriarchal, with the men hunting and women farming and doing most of the housework. Few of them ever leave their territory, other than a very small number of coffee traders. A family will live in a one-room mud hut. A typical farm is a half-acre in size, cleared by slash-and-burn, on which they grow cassava, sugarcane and rice. Mangabeys, colobus, hogs and forest elephant graze in the secondary forest surrounding the Iyaelima settlements. All of these are hunted for food. The Iyaelima mostly use spears or bows and arrows, and are assisted by trained hunting dogs. The preferred prey includes various types of duiker and hogs. However, bonobos are never killed.

The etoschi, a council of wise men, make the decisions in a village. Sorcerers provide protection through witchcraft. Although they cannot destroy an evil spirit they can prevent it from doing harm. The villagers engage in sacred hunts, slaughtering the animals they catch in a sacred ritual on a public altar. They bury their dead beside or underneath the family hut. Until recently they practiced cannibalism to feed their ancestors.

== Conservationists ==
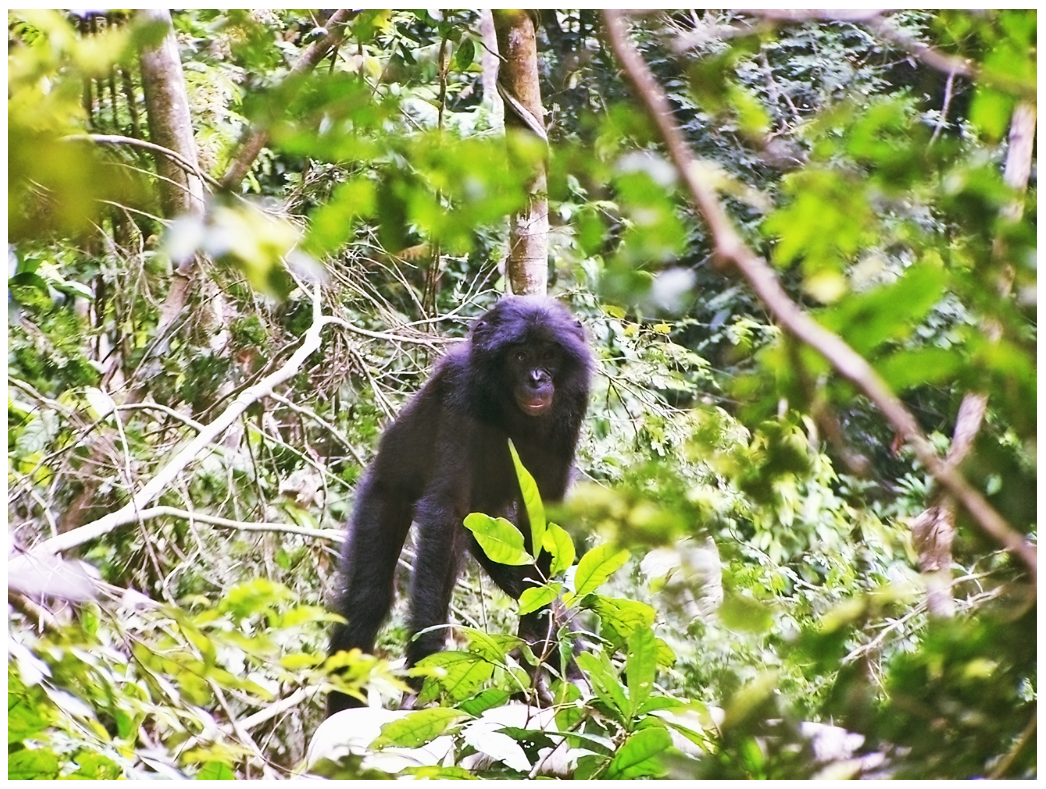
Juvenile bonobo

Contrary to the views of the WWF and other NGOs, a survey by Jo Thompson of the independent Lukuru Wildlife Research Project concluded that the Iyaelima were helping conserve the environment. The Iyaelima recognise that some sites are magical, inhabited by water or forest spirits or by their ancestral spirits. They do not occupy these locations or hunt in them, and in return the spirits provide protection. They thus create natural animal sanctuaries. Lake Nkantotsha is a spirit lake of this type. Hunters are careful to leave areas of forest undisturbed to allow animal populations to regenerate. Based on aerial photography, the impact of the Iyaelima on the forest is minimal.

The Salonga National Park is home to an unusually large group of bonobos, a species of ape that shares 98% of their DNA with humans and are thus our closest non-human relatives. The Iyaelima have a harmonious relationship with the bonobos, whose population is much higher in Iyaelima territory than elsewhere in the park. The Iyaelima recognize that bonobos are similar in many ways to humans, and see them as equally intelligent, but have no feeling of kinship with them and are insulted by the suggestion that they are relatives. However, they avoid bonobos when they meet them in the forest, thinking the bonobos may beat them up or kill them, just as other ethnic groups might. For this reason, they do not kill bonobos for fear of stirring up conflict with them.

The ICCN is understaffed in Salonga, with just 137 guards for the entire area, many near retirement age, where at least 1,000 would be needed to enforce conservation laws effectively. The Iyaelima, with their local knowledge and track record of conservation may be an effective alternative to guards.

== Sources ==
- Falk, John (February 7, 2008). "Why the Bonobos Need a Radio and Other (Unlikely) Lessons From Deepest Congo". National Geographic. Archived from the original on April 3, 2012.
- Furuichi, Takeshi; Thompson, Jo Myers (2008). The bonobos: behavior, ecology, and conservation. Springer. ISBN 978-0-387-74785-9.
- "Greatest hope for ape conservation". Rolex Awards. 2010.
- Hopson, Mark (2011). "The Wilderness Myth: How the Failure of the American National Park Model Threatens the Survival of the Iyaelima Tribe and the Bonobo Chimpanzee". Earth Jurisprudence and Environmental Justice Journal. 1 (1).
