= Loki dialect =

Bantu language of DR Congo

Loki
- Boloki
- Native to: Democratic Republic of the Congo
- Native speakers: (undated figure of 4,200)
- Language family: Niger–Congo?: Atlantic–Congo; Benue–Congo; Bantoid; Bantu (Zone C); Bangi–Ntomba (C.30); Zamba–Binza; Losengo; Loki

Language codes
- ISO 639-3: bkt
- Glottolog: bolo1262
- Guthrie code: C.36e
- ELP: Boloki

Loki (Boloki), or Ruki, is a Bantu language spoken in the Democratic Republic of the Congo. It is very close to Lingala. The Boloki (Baloki) people are named after the Ruki River; they live on either side of the Congo River where the Ruki joins it.
