= Bangala language =

Bantu language

Bangala
- Ngala
- Native to: Democratic Republic of the Congo, Republic of the Congo
- Region: Haut-Uele District
- Speakers: (undated figure of "few"); L2: 3.5 million (1991)
- Language family: Niger–Congo?: Atlantic–Congo; Benue–Congo; Bantoid; Bantu (Zone C); Bangi–Ntomba (C.30); Bangi–Moi; Bangi; Lingala; Bangala

Language codes
- ISO 639-3: bxg
- Glottolog: bang1353
- Guthrie code: C30A

Bangala or Mɔnɔkɔ na bangála is a Bantu language spoken in the northeast corner of the Democratic Republic of the Congo, it is also spoken in parts of South Sudan and some speakers are still found in the extreme western part of Uganda (e.g., Arua, Koboko). A sister language of Lingala, it is used as a lingua franca by people with different languages and rarely as a first language. In 1991 there were an estimated 3.5 million second-language speakers. It is spoken to the east and northeast of the area where Lingala is spoken. In Lingala, Bangala translates to "People of Mongala". This means people living along the Mongala River. Across Bas-Uele Province, Bangala speakers have to a great extent adopted Lingala.

== History ==
As Lingala spread east and north, its vocabulary was replaced more and more by local languages, and it became more of an interlanguage (a language that is a mix of two or more languages) and was classified as a separate language – Bangala. The vocabulary varies, depending on the first language of the speakers.

Around the 1980s, with the popularity and increased availability of Lingala in modern music, young people in large villages and towns began adopting Lingala so much that their Bangala is becoming more of a dialect than a separate language.

== Characteristics ==
In Bangala, the words for six and seven (motoba, sambo) are replaced with the Swahili words sita and saba. Many Lingala words are replaced by words in Swahili, Zande, other local languages, plus English (bilizi is derived from the English word bridge) and French.

The verb "to be" is conjugated differently in Bangala. Below is a comparison with Lingala.

English	Lingala	Bangala
I am	nazali	ngái azí (=ng'azí)
you are (singular)	ozali	yó azí (y'ozí)
he/she is	azali	(yé) azí
it is	ezali	(angó) azí
we are	tozali	ɓísú azí, sometimes tazí, less often tozí
you are (plural)	bozali	ɓínú azí
they are	bazali	ɓu azí, sometimes ɓazí

The verb prefix ko-, meaning "to" in Lingala is instead ku-, as it is in Swahili, so "to be" in Bangala is kusara, not kosala. Many other Bangala words have an /u/ sound where Lingala has an /o/ sound, such as ɓisu (not biso - "we") and mutu (not moto - "person").

== Documentation ==
Several old missionary sketches exist, most of them from the late 19th and early 20th century, e.g., Wtterwulghe (1899), MacKenzie (1910), Heart of Africa Mission (1916), van Mol (1927). However, Bangala as described in these concise overview sketches has changed over the past one hundred years, due to language contact with Ubangian languages and Nilo-Saharan languages of northeastern DR Congo. Currently, researchers from Ghent University, JGU Mainz and Goethe-Universität Frankfurt are working on a grammatical description of the language.
