= Kuba language =

Language

Kuba
- Likuba
- Native to: Republic of the Congo
- Native speakers: 53,000 (2018)
- Language family: Niger–Congo?: Atlantic–Congo; Volta-Congo; Benue–Congo; Bantoid; Southern Bantoid; Bantu (Zone C); Bangi–Ntomba (C.30, traditionally C.20 Mboshi); Bangi–Moi; Kuba

Language codes
- ISO 639-3: kxx
- Glottolog: liku1242
- Guthrie code: C.27

Kuba (Likuba, Kyba) is a Bantu language spoken on the right bank of the Congo River in the Republic of Congo.

Ethnologue reports that it is mutually intelligible with Kwala, in the C.20 group where it was classified by Guthrie 1948. However, Nurse & Philippson (2003), it belongs with the Bangi–Ntomba group, C.30.
