= Mpama language =

Bantu language

Mpama
- Pama
- Native to: Congo-Kinshasa
- Region: Ubangi River
- Language family: Niger–Congo?: Atlantic–Congo; Benue–Congo; Bantoid; Bantu (Zone C); Bangi–Ntomba (C.30); Bangi–Moi; Mpama

Language codes
- ISO 639-3: None (mis)
- Glottolog: mpam1239
- Guthrie code: C.323

Mpama (Pama) is a Bantu language of Kasai, Democratic Republic of Congo. It is spoken by the Mpama people.
