= Sakata language =

Language

Sakata
- Native to: Democratic Republic of the Congo
- Ethnicity: Sakata people
- Native speakers: (75,000 cited 1982)
- Language family: Niger–Congo?: Atlantic–Congo; Benue–Congo; Bantoid; Bantu (Zone C); Bangi–Ntomba (C.30); Sakata
- Dialects: Sakata proper; Djia; Bai; Tuku

Language codes
- ISO 639-3: skt
- Glottolog: saka1287
- Guthrie code: C.34

Sakata is a Bantu dialect cluster of DR Congo. The dialects are rather divergent: Sakata proper, Djia (Wadia), Bai (Kibay), Tuku (Ketu, Batow).

According to Glottolog, it may be one of the Teke languages.
