= Monkoto =

Territory of the Democratic Republic of the Congo

Monkoto is a territory of the Democratic Republic of the Congo. It is located in Tshuapa Province.

The village of Monkoto (Coordinates:1°44′40″S 20°41′10″E) is within Monkoto Territory. It is on the Momboyo river and is served by Monkoto Airport.

Monkoto was the birthplace of Ambroise Boimbo.
