= Sengele language =

Bantu language of DR Congo

Sengele
- Native to: Democratic Republic of the Congo
- Region: Bandundu province
- Native speakers: 17,000 (2002)
- Language family: Niger–Congo?: Atlantic–Congo; Benue–Congo; Bantoid; Bantu (Zone C); Bangi–Ntomba (C.30); Sengele

Language codes
- ISO 639-3: szg
- Glottolog: seng1278
- Guthrie code: C.33

Sengele is a Bantu language of the Democratic Republic of the Congo.
