= Mpama people =

Bantu ethnic group native to the Congos

The Mpama are a Bantu ethnic group that today live in eastern Congo and western Democratic Republic of Congo, mainly along the Congo River. Because of their similarity to the Lia, Ntomba and Sengele, they are considered part of the Mongo ethnic group. They are river residents and lived traditionally from fishing, agriculture and trade in the Congo.

They speak Mpama, a Bantu language.
