= Mongo language =

Bantu language of the Democratic Republic of Congo

Mongo
- Nkundu
- Lomongo
- Region: Democratic Republic of Congo
- Ethnicity: Mongo people
- Native speakers: (400,000 cited 1995)
- Language family: Niger–Congo?: Atlantic–Congo; Volta-Congo; Benue–Congo; Bantoid; Southern Bantoid; Bantu (Zone C); Bangi–Ntomba; Mongo–Bolia; Mongo–Nkunda (C.60); Mongo

Language codes
- ISO 639-2: lol
- ISO 639-3: lol – inclusive code Individual code: ymg – Yamongeri
- Glottolog: mong1338 Mongo bafo1235 Bafoto
- Guthrie code: C.61,611; C.36H

Mongo, also called Nkundo or Mongo-Nkundu (Lomongo, Lonkundu), is a Bantu language spoken by several of the Mongo peoples in the Democratic Republic of the Congo. Mongo speakers reside in the north-west of the country over a large area inside the curve of the Congo River. Mongo is a tonal language.

== Dialects ==
There are several dialects. Maho (2009) lists one of these, Bafoto (Batswa de l'Equateur), C.611, as a separate language. The others are:

- Kutu (Bakutu), including Longombe
- Bokote, including Ngata
- Booli
- Bosaka
- Konda (Ekonda), including Bosanga-Ekonda
- Ekota
- Emoma
- Ikongo, including Lokalo-Lomela
- Iyembe
- Lionje, Nsongo, Ntomba
- Yamongo
- Mbole, including Nkengo, Yenge, Yongo, Bosanga-Mbole, Mangilongo, Lwankamba
- Nkole
- South Mongo, including Bolongo, Belo, Panga, Acitu
- Yailima
- Ngombe-Lomela, Longombe, Ngome à Múná

== Phonology ==
=== Consonants ===
| | | Labial | Alveolar | Palatal | Velar | Glottal |
|---|---|---|---|---|---|---|
| Nasal | | m | n | ɲ | ŋ | |
| Plosive | plain | p b | t d | | k ɡ | |
| Plosive | prenasal | ᵐp ᵐb | ⁿt ⁿd | | ᵑk ᵑɡ | |
| Affricate | plain | | t͡s d͡z | | | |
| Affricate | prenasal | | ⁿt͡s ⁿd͡z | | | |
| Fricative | plain | f | s | | | h |
| Fricative | prenasal | | ⁿs | | | |
| Lateral | | | l | | | |
| Approximant | | w | | j | | |

- /d͡z/ can be heard as alveolar or dental [d̪͡z̪] and /t͡s/ can be alveolar or postalveolar [t͡ʃ], when before front vowels.

=== Vowels ===
| | Front | Central | Back |
|---|---|---|---|
| Close | i | | u |
| Close-mid | e | | o |
| Open-mid | ɛ | | ɔ |
| Open | | a | |

== Oral literature ==
In 1921, Edward Algernon Ruskin, a Christian missionary at Bongandanga from 1891 until 1935 in what was then the Belgian Congo, published Mongo Proverbs and Fables, with the Mongo text and an English translation. As Ruskin explains in the foreword to the book, his goal was to train missionaries in the Mongo language. The book contains 405 Mongo proverbs. Here are some examples:

- "Ntambaka jit'a nkusa." ("You do not go hunting porcupines and collecting bark for making string at the same time.") (#88)
- "Nkema ntawaka ndesanya." ("A monkey is not killed by merely watching it.") (#172)
- "Ise aomaki njoku, beke bempate nko?" ("Your father killed an elephant, then where are your tusks?") (#219)
- "Tusake wese; wunyu botaka 'akata." ("Do not throw away a bone; a piece of lean meat has not yet fallen into your hands.") (#389)

There are also 21 Mongo fables in the book, including a story about Ulu, the trickster Tortoise.

In an earlier booklet, Proverbs, Fables, Similes and Sayings of the Bamongo, published in 1897, Ruskin provides a word by word analysis of some Mongo proverbs, often accompanied by a brief fable.

In 1909, Frederick Starr published a collection of 150 Nkundo (Mongo) proverbs with English translations, "Proverbs of Upper Congo," which he selected from a 1904 publication, Bekolo bi' ampaka ba Nkundo. Bikolongo la nsako. Beki Bakola otakanyaka (Stories of the Elders of Nkundo: Adages and Proverbs Gathered by Bakola) by Bakola, also known as Ellsworth Farris, and Royal J. Dye, missionaries based near Coquilhatville (now Mbandaka). Here are some of those proverbs:

- "Bobimbo nko lobya, nk'ome w'etuka." "The bobimbo bears no great flowers, but what large fruit it has (i.e. show is not always a sign of substance)." (#24)
- "Bocik'a nsoso: ng'omanga ntokumba, ifoyala lobi enkolonkoko." "Spare the chicken: if the wild-cat does not take it, it will become large (i.e. do not despise small things)." (#26)
- "Boseka nkoi, lokola nkingo." "The friendship of the leopard, a claw in your neck (i.e. like nursing a serpent)." (#64)
- "Bosai'omonkolo bondotaji mpota, beuma beyokoka l'alongo." "One finger gashed, all the fingers are covered with blood (i.e. if one suffers, all are involved)." (#66)

Starr is also the author of A Bibliography of Congo Languages. For more recent bibliography, see A. J. de Rop's La littérature orale mongo, published in 1974. For a comprehensive study of Mongo proverbs, see Hulstaert's Proverbes mongo, published in 1958, which contains over 2500 Mongo proverbs with accompanying French translations.
