= Salonga National Park =

National park in the Democratic Republic of the Congo

Salonga National Park Parc national de la Salonga
- IUCN category II (national park)
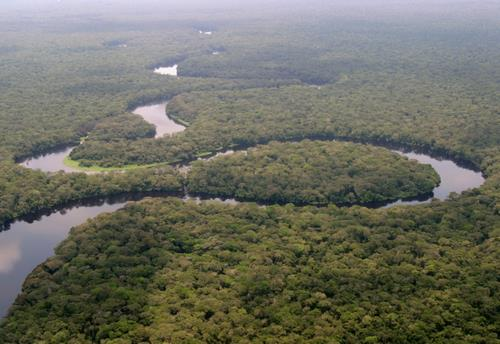
- View of a river in the Salonga National Park in 2005

- Location within Democratic Republic of the Congo
- Location: Democratic Republic of the Congo
- Coordinates: 2°S 21°E
- Area: 36,000 km^{2} (14,000 sq mi)
- Established: 1970
- Governing body: Institut Congolais pour la Conservation de la Nature

UNESCO World Heritage Site
- Type: Natural
- Criteria: vii, ix
- Designated: 1984 (8th session)
- Reference no.: 280
- Region: Africa
- Endangered: 1999–2021

Salonga National Park (French: Parc National de la Salonga) is a national park in the Democratic Republic of the Congo located in the Congo River basin. It is Africa's largest tropical rainforest reserve covering about 36,000 km^{2} or 3,600,000 hectares (8,900,000 acres). It extends into the provinces of Mai Ndombe, Equateur, Kasaï and Sankuru. In 1984, the national park was inscribed on the UNESCO World Heritage List for its protection of a large swath of relatively intact rainforest and its important habitat for many rare species. In 1999, the site has been listed as endangered due to poaching and housing construction. Following the improvement in its state of conservation, the site was removed from the endangered list in 2021.

== Geography ==
The park is in an area of rainforest about halfway between Kinshasa, the capital, and Kisangani. There are no roads and most of the park is accessible only by river. Sections of the national park are almost completely inaccessible and have never been systematically explored. The southern region inhabited by the Iyaelima people is accessible via the Lokoro River, which flows through the center and northern parts of the park, and the Lula River in the south. The Salonga River meanders in a generally northwest direction through the Salonga National Park to its confluence with the Busira River.

== History ==
The Salonga National Park was established as the Tshuapa National Park in 1956, and gained its present boundaries with a 1970 presidential decree by President Mobutu Sese Seko. It was registered as a UNESCO World Heritage Site in 1984. Due to the civil war in the eastern half of the country, it was added to the List of World Heritage in Danger in 1999.

The park is co-managed by the Institut Congolais pour la Conservation de la Nature and the World Wide Fund for Nature since 2015. Extensive consultation is ongoing, with the two main populations living within the park; the Iyaelima, the last remaining residents of the park and the Kitawalistes, a religious sect who installed them-self in the park just after its creation. An intense collaboration exists between the park guards and the Iyaelima, as Iyaelima villages are used as guard posts. It is known that bonobo densities are highest around Iyaelima villages which shows that they cause no threat to the park's emblematic species.

== Ecology ==
Located in the center of the Congo Basin, Salonga National Park protects the largest rainforest in Africa and the second largest in the world. The large size and ecological complexity of this rainforest has allowed species and communities to evolve relatively undisturbed. As a result, the national park protects a highly biodiverse and unique ecosystem. Of 735 identified plant species in the southwestern part of the park, 85% rely on animals to disperse their seeds, a process called zoochory.

Many large mammals are found within the park at relatively high densities, including Bongo antelopes, black-crested mangabeys, leopards, and bonobos. The southern region has been the location for studies of bonobos in the wild. There are much higher populations of bonobos near the Iyaelima settlements than elsewhere in the park, apparently because the Iyaelima do not harm them and are playing a strong role in their conservation. Despite hunting pressure, a viable population of forest elephants survive in the park.

Other than bonobo, park is home to several species primates such as Dryas monkey, Thollon's red colobus, Allen's swamp monkey, golden-bellied mangabey, red-tailed monkey, Potto, dwarf bushbaby.

Other mammals in the park include the long-tailed pangolin, giant pangolin, tree pangolin, Congo clawless otter, spotted-necked otter, Angolan kusimanse, aquatic genet, hippopotamus, the African golden cat, red river hog, blue duiker, yellow-backed duiker, sitatunga, bushbuck, water chevrotain and forest buffalo.

There are many bird species present within the park, including the cattle egret, black stork and yellow-billed stork. The Congo peafowl, a threatened bird species endemic to the Congo Basin and the national bird of the Democratic Republic of the Congo, lives in both the primary and secondary forests within the park.

56 fish species have been identified in the park, including the catfishes Clarias monsembulai and Synodontis nigriventris. African slender-snouted crocodiles are also found within the park.

== Access ==
The primary access is via motor vehicle or trekking along the dirt road going South-east from Monkoto Airport. There are houses and villages on either side of the road, leading to Salonga National Park.

== Sources ==
- Furuichi, Takeshi; Thompson, Jo Myers (2008). The bonobos: behavior, ecology, and conservation. Springer. ISBN 978-0-387-74785-9.
- INCEF - Conservation and Health in Salonga
- Wildlife Conservation Society
- UNESCO Salonga National Park Site
- WCMC Site Data Sheet
