= Leucocoprinus submontagnei =

Scientific classification
- Domain: Eukaryota
- Kingdom: Fungi
- Division: Basidiomycota
- Class: Agaricomycetes
- Order: Agaricales
- Family: Agaricaceae
- Genus: Leucocoprinus
- Species: L. submontagnei

Binomial name
- Leucocoprinus submontagnei (Beeli) Heinem. (1977)

Synonyms
- Lepiota montagnei var. congolensis Beeli (1936)

Species of fungus

Leucocoprinus submontagnei Mycological characteristics
- Gills on hymenium
- Cap is campanulate or convex
- Hymenium is free
- Stipe has a ring
- Spore print is white
- Ecology is saprotrophic
- Edibility is unknown

Leucocoprinus submontagnei is a species of mushroom producing fungus in the family Agaricaceae.

== Taxonomy ==
It was first described in 1936 by the Belgian mycologist Maurice Beeli who classified the species as Lepiota Montagnei var. congolensis, a variant of Károly Kalchbrenner's earlier classification of Lepiota montagnei.

In 1977 it was reclassified as Leucocoprinus submontagnei by the Belgian mycologist Paul Heinemann.

== Description ==
Leucocoprinus submontagnei is a small dapperling mushroom with white flesh.

Cap: 1–3 cm wide, campanulate or convex and expanding with age. The surface is white with a very dark brown or purplish-brown woolly (tomentose) centre disc or umbo. The scales are densely concentrated in the centre and sparsely scattered towards the cap edges, where striations extend about halfway up the cap. Gills: Free, crowded and white. Stem: Around 6 cm long and 2-3mm thick with a slightly thicker base. The surface is smooth and white whilst the interior is hollow. The membranous stem ring is white and described as narrow and funnel shaped. Spores: Ellipsoid or amygdaliform with a pore. 6.5-8.1 x 4.2-5.1 μm. The mushroom drys ochre-brown.

== Habitat and distribution ==
L. submontagnei is scarcely recorded and little known. The specimen originally examined by Beeli was collected by M. Goossens-Fontana in 1923 in the Eala region of Zaire, Central Africa (now the Democratic Republic of the Congo) where they were found growing on the soil.

GBIF contains only one other recorded observation of this species. The second was recorded in Brazil in 1985 by Rolf Singer where they were found growing on dead Dicotyledon leaves in a flood plain.

A 2006 study documented this species from Kerala state, India.

== Etymology ==
The specific epithet montagnei as used in the earlier classification was likely named to honour the French bryologist and mycologist Jean Pierre François Camille Montagne. There are also various species of moss, lichen and succulents named for him.

== Similar species ==
The illustrations provided along with Beeli's study and the description from Heinemann are describing a mushroom which is very similar looking to Leucocoprinus heinemannii.
