= Leucocoprinus elaeidis =

Scientific classification
- Kingdom: Fungi
- Division: Basidiomycota
- Class: Agaricomycetes
- Order: Agaricales
- Family: Agaricaceae
- Genus: Leucocoprinus
- Species: L. elaeidis

Binomial name
- Leucocoprinus elaeidis (Beeli) Heinem. (1977)

Synonyms
- Lepiota elaeidis Beeli (1927)

Species of fungus

Leucocoprinus elaeidis
- Mycological characteristics
- Gills on hymenium
- Cap is campanulate or umbonate
- Hymenium is free
- Stipe has a ring
- Spore print is white
- Ecology is saprotrophic
- Edibility is unknown

Leucocoprinus elaeidis (or elaidis) is a species of mushroom-producing fungus in the family Agaricaceae. In the local language, it is commonly known as elela.

== Taxonomy ==
It was first described in 1927 by the Belgian mycologist Maurice Beeli who classified it as Lepiota elaeidis (or elaidis), whilst illustrations of the mushrooms were produced by Mme M. Goossens-Fontana.

In 1977 it was reclassified by the Belgian mycologist Paul Heinemann who classified it as Leucocoprinus elaeidis.

== Description ==
Leucocoprinus elaeidis is a dapperling mushroom with thin white flesh and stem flesh that may stain yellow.

Cap: 7-12cm wide with thin 2mm thick flesh. The cap is a fluffy white and coated in white flakes or scales whilst the umbo or centre disc is sometimes tinged brown or yellowish. It starts bulbous and cylindrical before expanding to campanulate (bell shaped) and flattening further with age making the umbo more pronounced. There are slight striations at the cap edges. Gills: Free with a collar, crowded and white but yellowing when damaged. Stem: 7-9cm long and 8-12mm thick, expanding at the base to 15-20mm. The stem is hollow and easily detaches from the cap. White and smooth above the stem ring and scaly or flaky white below but staining yellow when touched or damaged. The movable stem ring is white and fluffy at the edges and is located towards the top of the cap (superior or apical). Spore print: White. Spores: Amygdaliform. 8.5-11 x 5.3-7.4 μm. Smell: Pleasant. Taste: Pleasant. When dry the mushroom develops an ochre colour whilst the gills discolour yellowish.

== Habitat and distribution ==
L. elaeidis is scarcely recorded and little known. It grows on the ground and in grass near elaeis, coffee and eucalyptus trees and is sometimes found on rotten wood or compost.

The specimens studied by Beeli were found in groups in the grass at the foot of Elaeis oil palms in the Eala region of the Zaïre (now the Democratic Republic of the Congo). They were also found near lake Edward and lake Kivu to the North East of the country and have been observed in Mali and Senegal.

== Similar species ==
The description and illustrations of L. elaeidis suggest that the species is similar to Leucocoprinus cretaceous which can present with a yellow coloured stem when the white coating is brushed off or Leucocoprinus cepistipes, which can bruise yellow when handled. The illustration and spore size more closely match L. cretaceus so this species may be synonymous with it.
