= Leucocoprinus discoideus =

Scientific classification
- Kingdom: Fungi
- Division: Basidiomycota
- Class: Agaricomycetes
- Order: Agaricales
- Family: Agaricaceae
- Genus: Leucocoprinus
- Species: L. discoideus

Binomial name
- Leucocoprinus discoideus (Beeli) Heinem. (1977)

Synonyms
- Lepiota discoidea Beeli (1936)

Species of fungus

Leucocoprinus discoideus
- Mycological characteristics
- Gills on hymenium
- Cap is campanulate or conical
- Hymenium is free
- Stipe has a ring
- Spore print is white
- Ecology is saprotrophic
- Edibility is unknown

Leucocoprinus discoideus is a species of mushroom producing fungus in the family Agaricaceae. In the local language when the mushroom cap is open it is known as batakania or bepokua pembe when it is immature with a closed cap. However 'bepokua' may also be used to refer to other similar looking mushroom species such as Micropsalliota bambusicola.

== Taxonomy ==
It was first described in 1936 by the Belgian mycologist Maurice Beeli who classified it as Lepiota discoidea, whilst illustrations of the mushrooms were produced by Mme M. Goossens-Fontana.

In 1977 it was reclassified by the Belgian mycologist Paul Heinemann who classified it as Leucocoprinus discoideus.

== Description ==
Leucocoprinus discoideus is a small dapperling mushroom with whitish flesh which discolours pinkish brown.

Cap: 3-6cm wide with a white, campanulate (bell shaped) to conical cap and a slight brown umbo. It is covered in small brownish ochre scales which are concentrated on the centre disc or umbo and sparsely scattered on the rest of the cap surface. The cap edges have striations which extend about halfway across the cap. Gills: Free, crowded and white. Stem: 7–8 cm tall and 4–5 mm thick with a hairy (tomentose) coating. It is hollow, white and discolours pale pinkish brown with age. The fragile, membranous stem ring is white and located towards the top of the stem. Spore print: White. Spores: Ellipsoid with a pore. (8.1)9.1–11.3 × (5.7)6.3–7.3 μm. Taste: Bitter. When dry it discolours light brown.

== Habitat and distribution ==
L. discoideus is scarcely recorded and little known. The specimens studied by Heinemann were found in the forest of the Eala region in Zaïre (now the Democratic Republic of the Congo). They were growing in a dense group on a dead tree trunk and on the ground in a dry forest area. Additional specimens were found near Lubumbashi in the South of the country and found growing on decomposing coffee in a plantation near lake Edward and lake Kivu to the North East.

It was also recorded growing in a potted plant in a greenhouse at the Meise Botanic Garden in Belgium.
