= Union for the Republic =

Union for the Republic may refer to various political parties:

- Union for the Republic (Burkina Faso)
- Union for the Republic (Congo)
- Union for the Republic (Gabon)
- Union for the Republic (Italy)
- Union for the Republic (Mauritania)
- Union for the Republic (San Marino)
- Union for the Republic (Togo)
- Union for the Republic – National Movement, a political party of the Democratic Republic of the Congo
