= Leucocoprinus beelianus =

Scientific classification
- Kingdom: Fungi
- Division: Basidiomycota
- Class: Agaricomycetes
- Order: Agaricales
- Family: Agaricaceae
- Genus: Leucocoprinus
- Species: L. beelianus

Binomial name
- Leucocoprinus beelianus Heinem. (1977)

Synonyms
- Lepiota citrinella Beeli (1932)

Species of fungus

Leucocoprinus beelianus
- Mycological characteristics
- Gills on hymenium
- Cap is campanulate or flat
- Hymenium is free
- Stipe has a ring
- Spore print is white
- Ecology is saprotrophic
- Edibility is unknown

Leucocoprinus beelianus is a species of mushroom producing fungus in the family Agaricaceae.

== Taxonomy ==
It was first described in 1932 by the Belgian mycologist Maurice Beeli and was illustrated in 1936. Beeli had classified the species as Lepiota citrinella apparently without realising that this name had already been used by the Argentinian mycologist Carlo Luigi Spegazzini in 1898. Thus Beeli's classification was illegitimate.

In 1977 the Belgian mycologist Paul Heinemann classified it as Leucocoprinus beelianus and recognised Beeli's Lepiota citrinella as a synonym. Heinemann specifically stated that it was not the same as Spegazzini's Lepiota citrinella, which was ultimately reclassified as Leucocoprinus citrinellus in 1987.

== Description ==
Leucocoprinus beelianus is a dapperling mushroom with thin white flesh.

Cap: 5-8cm wide, campanulate (bell shaped) and flattening as it expands. The umbo or centre disc is thicker than the rest of the cap and is reddish brown with woolly scales (tomentose). The rest of the cap surface is devoid of scales and pale yellow but white towards the edges where striations are present and run a third of the way up the cap, or less. Stem: 5-11cm long and 3.5-5mm thick with a slightly thicker base of up to 10mm. The exterior surface is light brown and has similar woolly scales to the cap whilst the interior is hollow. The membranous, immobile stem ring is located towards the top of the stem (superior) and is brownish with more pronounced brown edges. Gills: Free with a small collar, crowded and white. Spores: Amygdaliform. 8.4-12.3 x 5.2-7.2 μm. Taste: Bitter. When dry specimens discolour reddish brown colour.

== Habitat and distribution ==
L. beelianus is scarcely recorded and little known. Beeli's and Heinemann's studies were based on specimens from Zaire, Central Africa (now the Democratic Republic of the Congo) where they were found on the ground and on dead wood in the forest near the town of Binga where they were described as 'abundant'. Specimens of Beeli's Lepiota citrinella were also found in Gabon in Africa. GBIF only contains one recorded observation of L. beelianus.

== Etymology ==
The specific epithet beelianus is named for the Belgian mycologist Maurice Beeli who originally classified this species but provided an invalid name.
