= Paul Panda Farnana =

First Congolese with Belgian diploma of higher education

Paul Panda Farnana M'Fumu
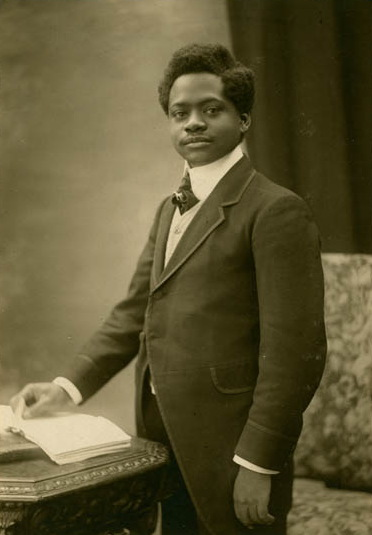
- Paul Panda Farnana in 1921
- Born: 1888; Zemba-lez-Moanda, Bas-Congo Province, Congo Free State
- Died: 12 May 1930 (aged 41–42); Matadi, Belgian Congo
- Education: Horticultural and agricultural school in Vilvoorde, Institute for tropical agriculture in Nogent-sur-Marne
- Occupations: Agronomist, Activist
- Known for: First Congolese intellectual, Anti-colonial activism
- Notable work: Participation in Pan-African Congresses, Critique of Belgian colonial practices
- Parent(s): Luizi Fernando (father), N'Sengo (mother)

Paul Panda Farnana M'Fumu (1888 – 12 May 1930) was a Congolese agronomist and expatriate who lived in Europe in the first decades of the 1900s. He has been considered to be the first Congolese intellectual. The Paul Panda Farnana Administrative Building in Kinshasa is named in his honour.

== Early life and education ==
Paul Panda Farnana was born in Zemba-lez-Moanda, Bas-Congo Province, Congo Free State in 1888. He was the son of Luizi Fernando, a government-appointed chief, and a woman named N'Sengo. A Belgian official, Lieutenant Jules Derscheid, offered to bring Farnana to Belgium to receive an education. He accepted, and they arrived in Brussels on 25 April 1900. Once there, Dersheid turned custody of Farnana over to his sister, Louise. Farnana was brought up in an upper-class setting. Louise educated him in music and drawing and sent him to the Athénée Royal d'Ixelles for a secondary education. In 1904, he passed an entrance exam and was enrolled in a horticultural and agricultural school in Vilvoorde, graduating three years later with distinction. In 1908, Farnana studied at an institute for tropical agriculture in Nogent-sur-Marne, Paris, France. That same year he studied English in Mons. This education made him the first Congolese to ever receive a diploma of higher education in Belgium.

== Career and activism ==
In 1909, Farnana was hired as an agricultural specialist by the Belgian colonial government which had since transformed the Congo Free State into the Belgian Congo. In June, he was assigned to the Botanic Garden of Eala, near Coquilhatville.

Shortly before the outbreak of World War I Farnana was living in Belgium. When Belgium was invaded by Germany in 1914, Farnana enlisted in the Belgian Army. He served with the Korps der Congolese Vrijwilligers (Congolese Volunteers Corps) during the Siege of Namur. On 23 August 1914, he was taken prisoner in Liège, together with Joseph Adipanga and Albert Kudjabo, and deported to Germany where he spent the remainder of the war. After his release, he founded an association known as the Union Congolaise to advocate for the interests of other Congolese veterans of the war.

Farnana participated in the first and second Pan-African Congresses in 1919 and 1921, respectively. He also attended the First National Belgian Colonial Congress in 1920. He actively criticized Belgian colonial practices, arguing that the ban on forced labour in the Congo was not being consistently applied and education for the native population was inadequate. He also called for the Congolese to be granted political rights.

In 1929, Farnana returned to the Congo. He built a school and a chapel in Nzemba, ordered a brick press from Europe and went to Matadi to manage an oil mill. Under unknown circumstances, he was poisoned there in 1930 and died May 12.

== Legacy ==
Farnana is considered by historians to be the first Congolese intellectual.

Farnana's work was largely forgotten by the public until Congolese historians began uncovering details about his life in the 1970s and 1980s. A Belgian documentary was made about him in 2008.

== See also ==
- Stefano Kaoze, first Congolese priest
- Thomas Kanza, first Congolese university graduate
- Sophie Kanza, first woman Congolese university graduate
- Marcel Lihau, first Congolese law student
