= Leucocoprinus citrinellus =

Scientific classification
- Domain: Eukaryota
- Kingdom: Fungi
- Division: Basidiomycota
- Class: Agaricomycetes
- Order: Agaricales
- Family: Agaricaceae
- Genus: Leucocoprinus
- Species: L. citrinellus

Binomial name
- Leucocoprinus citrinellus (Speg.) Raithelh. (1987)

Synonyms
- Lepiota citrinella Speg. (1898); Lepiota citrinella var. serrata Rick (1937)

Species of fungus

Leucocoprinus citrinellus Mycological characteristics
- Gills on hymenium
- Cap is umbonate or flat
- Hymenium is free
- Stipe has a ring
- Spore print is white
- Ecology is saprotrophic
- Edibility is unknown

Leucocoprinus citrinellus is a species of mushroom producing fungus in the family Agaricaceae.

== Taxonomy ==
It was first described in 1898 by the Argentinian mycologist Carlo Luigi Spegazzini who classified it as Lepiota citrinella.

In 1937 the Austrian-born Brazilian mycologist Johannes Rick described Lepiota citrinella var. serrata which he considered a variant based on the finely serrated gills and cylindrical spores. However this is now also considered a synonym.

The species was reclassified as Leucocoprinus citrinellus in 1987 by the mycologist Jörg Raithelhuber.

In 1932 the Belgian mycologist Maurice Beeli also classified a species as Lepiota citrinella and it was included in an illustrated book in 1936. However, as the name had already been used by Spegazzini, Beeli's classification was illegitimate. This species was later classified as Leucocoprinus beelianus by the Belgian mycologist Paul Heinemann in 1977.

== Description ==
Leucocoprinus citrinellus is a pale yellow dapperling mushroom which may discolour brownish with age.

Cap: Bright yellow with thin, insignificant flesh. Elliptical when immature and 5-7mm wide expanding to 1.5–2 cm wide and flattening as it ages with a 2-3mm wide umbo. The cap surface is covered in small powdery scales with striations that run from the edges to halfway up the cap. Gills: Free, crowded and yellowy white. Stem: 2–4 cm long and 1.5mm thick expanding slightly towards the base which is wider but not bulbous and presents with sparse white, cottony mycelium. The stem surface is yellow white and also powdery or scaly (furfuraceous) and the interior flesh hollows slightly with age. The yellowy white stem ring is thin, membranous and descending. It is persistent but movable and also exhibits scales on the edges. Spores: Ovate or subequilateral. 6 x 4 μm.

== Habitat and distribution ==
L. citrinellus is scarcely recorded and little known. Spegazzini observations were made based on specimens from Argentina whilst Rick's observations were made in the State of Rio Grande do Sul, Brazil. The GBIF only list a small number of observations from Brazil.
