= Roger Hitoto =

Democratic Republic of the Congo footballer

Personal information
- Date of birth: 24 February 1969 (age 57)
- Place of birth: Mbandaka, DR Congo
- Height: 1.77 m (5 ft 10 in)
- Position: Midfielder

Senior career*
Years	Team	Apps	(Gls)
1988–1994	Rouen		
1994–1999	Lille	109	(3)
2001–2002	Rouen	31	(1)
2003–2004	FC Mantois 78	6	(1)
2005–2006	Oissel		
2006–2007	Arménienne ASOA		

International career
- DR Congo
Medal record
Representing DR Congo
Men's football
Africa Cup of Nations
Third place	1998 Burkina Faso
- * Club domestic league appearances and goals

Roger Hitoto (born 24 February 1969) is a Congolese footballer who played as a midfielder in France for FC Rouen, Lille, FC Mantes, CMS Oissel and Arménienne ASOA.

== Honours ==
DR Congo

- African Cup of Nations: 3rd place, 1998
