= Banza Mukalay =

Congolese politician (1953-2016)

Baudouin Banza Mukalay Nsungu (January 2, 1953 – May 14, 2016) was a Congolese politician, born in Coquilhatville. He had most recently served as the Minister of Culture and the Arts of the Democratic Republic of Congo from December 2014 until his death in May 2016. Previously, Mukalay served as Minister of Youth, Sports, Culture and the Arts from April 2012 until December 2014 under President Joseph Kabila and Minister of Mines from 1996 to 1997 under Zaire President Mobutu Sese Seko.

Mukalay was a member of the Popular Movement of the Revolution (MPR) during the Mobutu regime. He was appointed Vice President of the MPR in 1990 and later served as Minister of Mines from 1996 to 1997 during the waning days of the Seso Seko dictatorship. Banza Mukalay went into exile following the overthrow of Mobutu Seso Seko and First Congo War in 1997. He returned to Kinshasa, Democratic Republic of the Congo, in 2004 and rejoined the government.

In April 2016, Mukalay and his ministry organized the funeral of Congolese musician, Papa Wemba.

Culture Minister Banza Mukalay died from a sudden illness at the Clinique Ngaliema Center, a hospital in Kinshasa, on May 14, 2016, at the age of 63. The government had been preparing to fly Mukalay out of the country for medical treatment at the time.
