= Frédéric Boyenga-Bofala =

Politician in the Democratic Republic of Congo

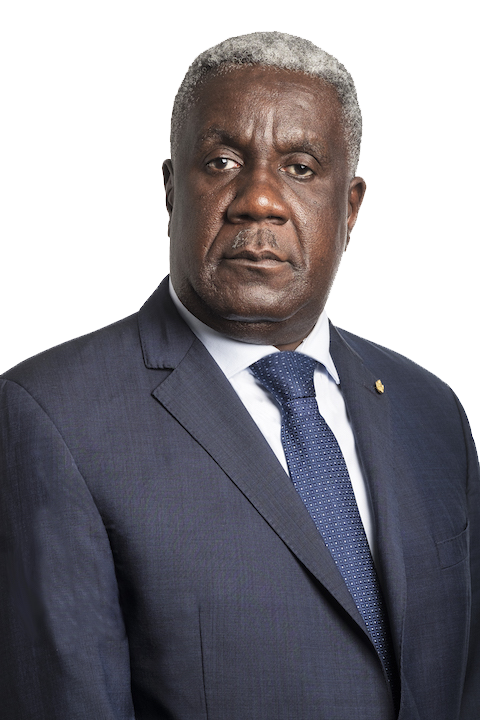
Frédéric Boyenga Bofala

Unir MN

Frédéric Boyenga Bofala (born February 3, 1960) is a Doctor in public international law and former teacher-researcher at the university of Université de Lille II.

Boyenga Bofala was born in Mbandaka in Équateur Province. In 2001 he created, and today leads, the Union for the Republic National Movement - UNIR NM (Union pour la Republique Mouvement National - UNIR MN), political party in the Democratic Republic of Congo (DRC), officially recorded in DRC by the ministerial decree N°130 of 7 April 2005 in accordance with the law on the political parties.

In 2017, Boyenga Bofala disappeared; he re-appeared after two months of detention.

== Publications ==
- In the Name of Congo Zaire, 2012
- Congo-Zaire - Remaking the Republic: crowned mission of a generation, 2001
- Diary for the re-establishment and the maintenance of peace in the area of the large-Lakes, the restoration of the territorial integrity and the re-establishment of the Republic in Congo-Zaire, 2002
- Congo-Zaire - Our Cause: The message and ambitions of a right cause, 2003

== See also ==
- Union for the Republic National Movement - UNIR NM
