= Albert Kudjabo =

Congolese soldier

- Albert Kudjabo playing a Melanesian drum at a prisoner of war camp in Münster, 1917. Picture by Wilhelm Doegen.
- Born: 15 March 1896; Kilo, Congo Free State
- Died: 1 November 1934 (aged 38); Brussels, Belgium
- Spouse: Ludovica Kempeneer (m. 1925–1934)
- Military career
- Allegiance: Belgian Army

Albert Kudjabo (15 March 1896 – 1 November 1934) was a Congolese soldier for the Belgian Army during the First World War, and prisoner of war.

== Early life ==
Kudjabo was born at the northeastern side of the Congo Free State. As a child, he received his education at a Catholic mission school in Kilo, Orientale Province. According to the archives of the German sound archive, he was a farmer who could handle mining equipment. Aged seventeen, he moved to Namur, Belgium. In Ghent, he worked as a so-called 'boy' or young household help.

== First World War ==
On 5 August 1914, a Congolese Volunteers' Corps for the Belgian Army was founded. Several Congolese volunteers enrolled, including Paul Panda Farnana, Joseph Adipanga, and Kudjabo. Kudjabo fought during the Siege of Namur, but was captured by the German Army at Lives-sur-Meuse on 23 August, together with Farnana and Adipanga. At that time, Kudjabo was wounded at his head. First, he stayed at the camp Soltau near Hannover, but was transferred to Münster by March 1917. The Royal Prussian Phonetic Institute (Königlich preußische phonographische Kommission) was interested in recording Kudjabo, who, according to coordinator of the recordings of African languages for the Institute Carl Meinhof, "knows the drum language". In addition, they used a Melanesian drum for the recording, underlining the creation of a composite "image of exotic otherness". In 1917, still a prisoner of war, his voice was recorded at the prisoner of war camp in Münster by the Phonetic Institute.

== Later life ==
After the war, Kudjabo shared an apartment with another Congolese war veteran, Antoine Manglunki, and his wife Julia Caron, in Schaerbeek. Kudjabo moved to Liège less than one year later. In 1919, Kudjabo co-founded the Union congolaise, together with Farnana and Adipanga. On 17 December 1925, he married Ludovica Kempeneer. They had four children. Kudjabo died in 1934 of a lung disease.

== Honours ==
- Belgium: Chevron de front (posthumously)

== Legacy ==
Albert Kudjabo's sound recording was used in the art installation "...and to those North Sea waves whispering sunken stories" by Sammy Baloji.
