= Mbandaka =

- Provincial capital and city
- Ville de Mbandaka
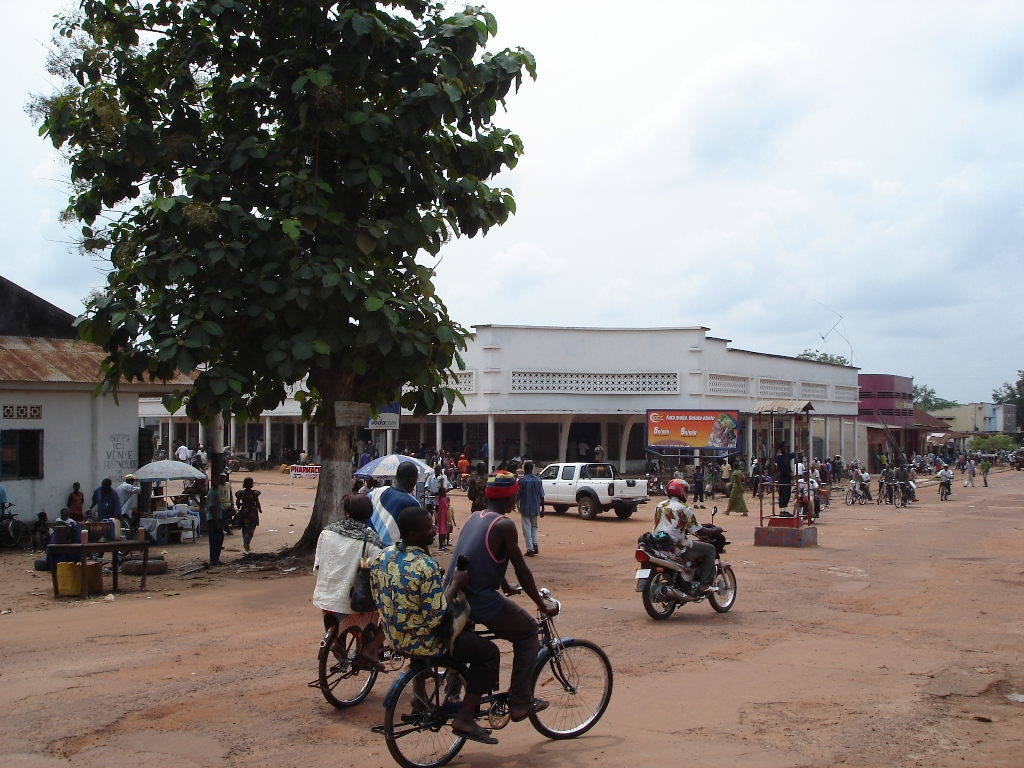
- Commercial center of Mbandaka, 2008

- Location within Democratic Republic of the Congo
- Coordinates: 0°02′52″N 18°15′21″E
- Country: DR Congo
- Province: Équateur Province
- Founded: 1883
- City status: 1958
- Communes: Mbandaka, Wangata

Government
  - Mayor: Yves Balo

Area
  - City: 460 km^{2} (180 sq mi)
- Elevation: 370 m (1,210 ft)

Population (2015)
  - City: 1,187,837
  - Density: 2,600/km^{2} (6,700/sq mi)
  - Urban: 376,000
  - Ethnicities: Anamongo
- Time zone: UTC+1 (West Africa Time)

Mbandaka (pronounced [mbaˈnda.ka], formerly known as Coquilhatville in French, or Coquilhatstad in Dutch) is a city in the Democratic Republic of Congo located near the confluence of the Congo and Ruki rivers. It is the capital of Équateur Province.

The city was founded in 1883 by British explorer Henry Morton Stanley under the name Équateurville.

The headquarters of the Fourth Naval Region of the Navy of the Democratic Republic of the Congo are located in the city.

== Geography ==
Mbandaka lies on the east bank of the Congo River below the mouth of the Ruki River, a tributary of the Congo. South of the Ngiri Reserve, a large area of swamp forest on the opposite bank of the Congo, it is located at the center of the Tumba-Ngiri-Maindombe wetland.

== Description ==
Mbandaka is the capital of Équateur province, and located only a few kilometers from the equator. It is home to Mbandaka airport and is linked by a four to seven day trip by river barge journey to Kinshasa and Boende. Kinshasa is an hour's plane ride away.

Mbandaka is largely populated by people of the Mongo ethnic group, although people from many different tribes and regions live in the city. The main languages spoken in Mbandaka are Lingala, French, and Mongo.

Years of war and neglect have caused deterioration of the city infrastructure; large areas of the city are without electricity or running water. Most of the streets and avenues of the city are unpaved dirt roads.

== History ==
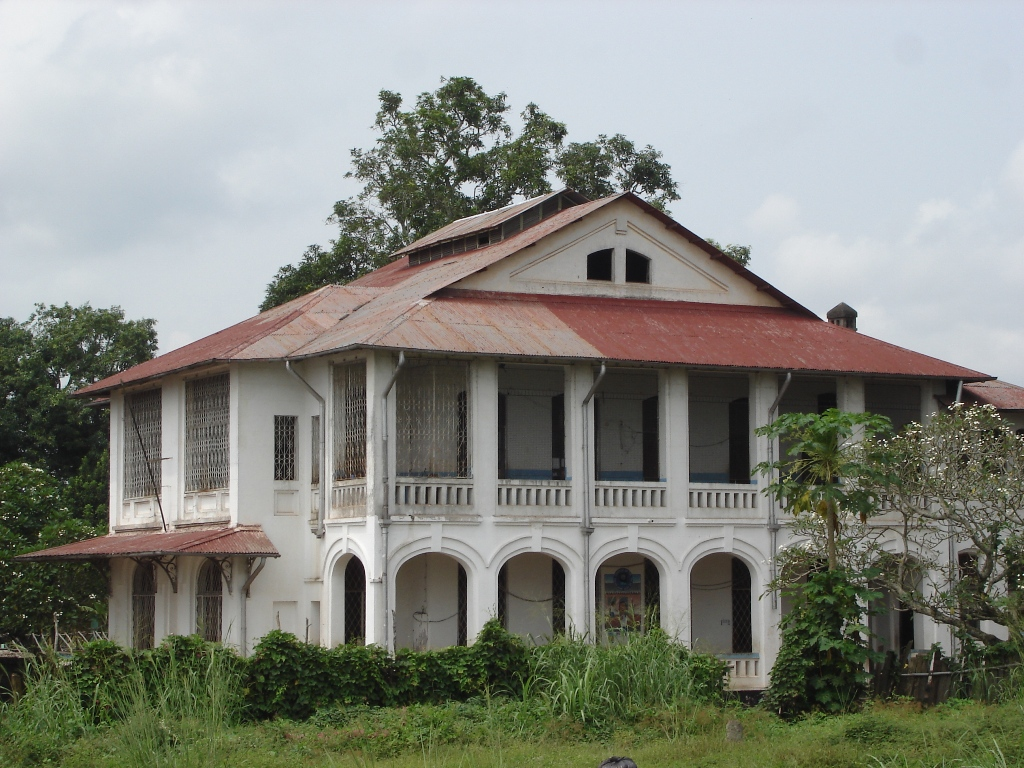
Bank of the Belgian Congo building

Mbandaka was founded in 1883 by British explorer Henry Morton Stanley, who named it "Équateurville". (At the time the territory was under the personal rule of King Leopold II, king of the Belgians and the official language was French.)

The town hall is about 4 km (2.5 miles) north of the equator. Mbandaka is one of the closest to the equator of any substantial city in the world. Stanley placed a large "Equator Stone" near the riverbank south of the city to mark the point where he believed the equator crossed the river. It remains there today. Due to its symbolic location close to the equator and the Congo River, there were early plans to locate the capital of the Congo Free State in Coquilhatville, as the city was then called, but they never came off the drawing board. These plans included infrastructure for an estimated population of 100,000 people, a train station, a Catholic cathedral, a governor's residence, and a palace for future visits of King Leopold II of the Belgians.

In 1886, at the beginning of colonial rule, the Belgians changed the city's name to "Coquilhatville" naming it after Camille-Aimé Coquilhat.

In 1938, work began on a bridge over the Congo River connecting Coquilhatville with the French Congo (now the Republic of Congo). Work was abandoned on the outbreak of the Second World War, and only the foundations of the bridge pillars remain. In the 1930s, the Government of the Belgian Congo began several projects, including factories and a new city hall.

The city hall was completed in 1947, just after the end of the Second World War. At that time, with a height of 39 m (128 feet), it was the tallest building in the Belgian Congo. A statue of Leopold II was installed on its roof. The city hall was destroyed by a fire in 1963.

After the Belgian Congo gained its independence as the Republic of the Congo, the new government changed the name of this city in 1966 to "Mbandaka" to honour a prominent local leader.

=== Massacre of Hutus ===
Near the end of the First Congo War in the late 20th century, hundreds of people (mainly Hutu refugees, women, and children) were massacred here on May 13, 1997. Congolese soldiers said the order came from Col. Wilson, head of a brigade of Kabila's troops, and Col. Richard, the brigade's operations chief, both Rwandans. Gen. Gaston Muyango (Congolese) held the title of military commander but had no real power, they said.

=== Ebola outbreak ===
On 16 May 2018, a case of Ebola occurred in the city, the disease having spread there from an outbreak in the countryside. A new outbreak was reported on 1 June 2020. Three cases were confirmed by the WHO and three cases are probable, of whom four people had died as of June 2, 2020.

== Main sights ==
=== Catholic Mission station and Central African history research centre of Bamanya ===
Church of the Missionaries of the Sacred Heart (MSC) at Bamanya, 2008.

A large research centre for Central African history, originally set up by Fathers Gustaaf Hulstaert and Honoré Vinck, is at the Catholic mission station of Bamanya (Congregation of the Immaculate Heart of Mary) (CCIM)), 10 km (6.2 miles) east of Mbandaka.

=== Eala Botanical Garden ===
There are botanical gardens at nearby Eala, about 7 km (4.3 miles) east of the town centre. The Eala Botanical Garden, founded in 1900, formerly container between 4,000 and 5,000 species. It covers approximately 370 hectares (910 acres) with special collections (125 ha or 310 acres), forest (190 ha or 470 acres), marsh (50 ha or 120 acres) and savanna "Euobe" (7 ha or 17 acres). Because of warfare and social disruption, the garden has been neglected. It is unfenced and subject to illegal logging. The last catalogue of its holdings was published in 1924.

=== First Habitat for Humanity International housing project ===
Mbandaka is the home of the world's first project of Habitat for Humanity International. Founder Millard Fuller served as missionary with the Disciples of Christ Church in Mbandaka from 1973 to 1976. The housing project Fuller started in Mbandaka in 1973 became known as the first project of Habitat for Humanity when Fuller founded Habitat upon his return to the United States.

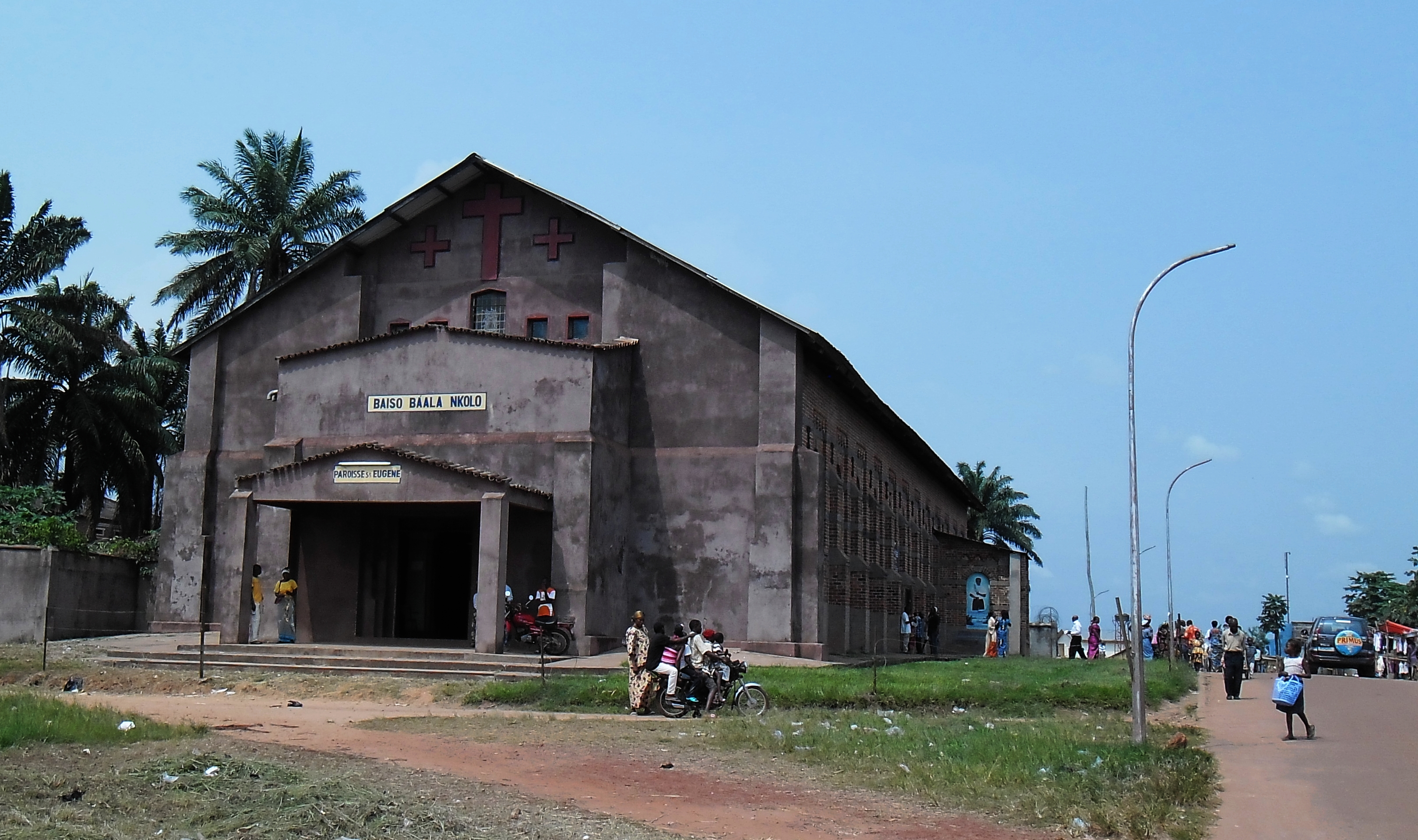
Mbandaka Catholic Cathedral of St Eugene. The words baiso baala nkolo, written above the church entrance, are the beginning of Psalm 123 in Mongo language.

== Climate ==
Mbandaka has a tropical rainforest climate (Af) under the Köppen climate classification. Although precipitation in the city does vary considerably, it does not have a dry season; the driest month is January, averaging around 68 millimetres or 2.7 inches of precipitation. The wettest is September with 201 millimetres or 7.9 inches. Temperatures are relatively constant throughout the course of the year, with median temperatures ranging from 74 to 79 °F (23.3 to 26.1 °C).

Climate data for Mbandaka (Eala Botanical Garden), elevation 350 m (1,150 ft), (1971–2000)
Month	Jan	Feb	Mar	Apr	May	Jun	Jul	Aug	Sep	Oct	Nov	Dec	Year
Mean daily maximum °C (°F)	30.5 (86.9)	31.3 (88.3)	31.3 (88.3)	31.3 (88.3)	31.2 (88.2)	29.9 (85.8)	28.9 (84.0)	29.2 (84.6)	29.9 (85.8)	30.2 (86.4)	30.1 (86.2)	30.4 (86.7)	30.4 (86.6)
Mean daily minimum °C (°F)	20.7 (69.3)	20.8 (69.4)	21.0 (69.8)	21.2 (70.2)	21.3 (70.3)	20.8 (69.4)	20.3 (68.5)	20.3 (68.5)	20.4 (68.7)	20.6 (69.1)	20.7 (69.3)	20.9 (69.6)	20.8 (69.3)
Average rainfall mm (inches)	68.0 (2.68)	94.0 (3.70)	168.0 (6.61)	137.0 (5.39)	111.0 (4.37)	90.0 (3.54)	104.0 (4.09)	166.0 (6.54)	201.0 (7.91)	186.0 (7.32)	134.0 (5.28)	96.0 (3.78)	1,555 (61.21)
Source: FAO

== People ==
- Guy Loando Mboyo, lawyer and politician
- Roger Hitoto, footballer
- Frédéric Boyenga-Bofala, politician
- José Bosingwa, footballer
- Adam Bombolé, politician
- Issama Mpeko, footballer
- Banza Mukalay, politician
- Jules Fontaine Sambwa, economist and politician

== See also ==
- University of Mbandaka
- Mbandaka Airport
- Roman Catholic Archdiocese of Mbandaka-Bikoro
