= Joseph Adipanga =

Congolese soldier

- Joseph Adipanga as a veteran of the First World War
- Born: 24 February 1895; Boma, Congo Free State
- Died: 14 August 1939 (aged 44) Brussels, Belgium
- Allegiance: Belgian Army
- Service years: 1914-1918
- Spouse: Berthe Colmadin

Joseph Adipanga (24 February 1895–14 August 1939) was a Congolese soldier for the Belgian Army during the First World War and civil servant at the Belgian Ministry of the Colonies.

== Early life ==
Adipanga was the son of Baka and Maria Somme. When general Jacques Collyns returned to Europe on 15 September 1911 from his work as a state inspector in the Belgian Congo, Adipanga accompanied him and went to Brussels where he founded a family. He married Berthe Colmadin.

== First World War ==
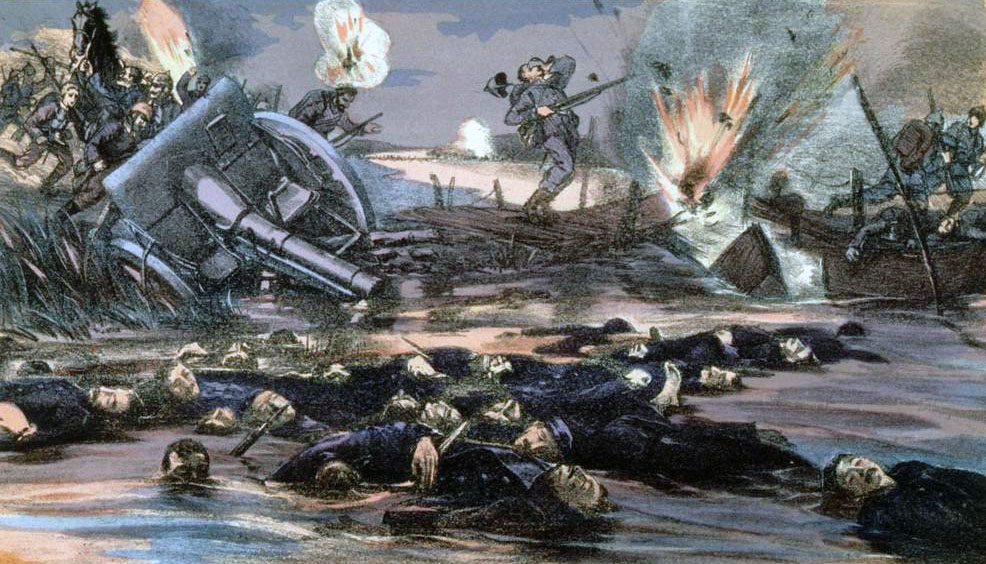
Depiction of the "admirable resistance" of Belgian forces during the Battle of the Yser.

The Congolese Volunteers' Corps for the Belgian Army was founded on 5 August 1914. Several Congolese volunteers enrolled, including Paul Panda Farnana and Adipanga. Under the lead of Louis-Napoléon Chaltin, Adipanga fought during the Siege of Namur, but was captured by the German Army, together with Farnana and Albert Kudjabo. Adipanga managed to escape and went on to fight with the First Carabineers' Regiment until 15 August 1915. He participated in the Battle of the Yser at Tervate, Stuivekenskerke, in October 1914. Then, he fought for the Second Regiment until 9 August 1918. Wounded in action, he received eight Chevrons de front for his service during the war.

== Later career ==
After the end of the war, Adipanga worked as a temporary messenger for the Belgian Ministry of Defence from 10 January 1920 to 31 March 1922. From 1 August 1933 until his death on 14 August 1939, he worked at the Ministry of the Colonies as a messenger for the Colonial Bureau. He suffered from chronic bronchitis.

Besides his professional career, Adipanga was the president of the Union congolaise, the first Congolese association representing Congolese residents in Belgium. Besides a social and cultural agenda, the association also had a political agenda, for instance regarding more Congolese participation in the colonial administration. Furthermore, he organised events showcasing Congolese dances and recordings of Congolese music.

== Honours ==
- Belgium: Eight Chevrons de front
- Belgium: Croix de guerre with Palms
- Belgium: Yser Medal
- Belgium: Volunteer Combatant's Medal 1914–1918
- Belgium: Victory Medal 1914-1918
- Belgium: Commemorative Medal of the Congo
- Belgium: Commemorative Medal of the 1914–1918 War
- Belgium: Fire Cross 1914–1918
