= Union for the Republic – National Movement =

Political party in the Democratic Republic of the Congo

The Union for the Republic National Movement (French: Union pour la République - Mouvement national, UNIR NM) is a political party of the Democratic Republic of the Congo (DRC) that was formed in 2001 by Frédéric Boyenga Bofala.

== Mission ==
The party describes its mission as:

"To remake the republic is the sacred mission of a generation - we must reconcile ourselves with our history, without a spirit of vengeance. We must reconcile ourselves with our dead"

== Chronology ==
- 2001: UNIR NM formed during the Second Congo War
- 2003: UNIR MN boycotts the Global and All-Inclusive Agreement that forms the Transitional Government of the Democratic Republic of the Congo
- 2005: UNIR NM campaigns against the new constitution
- 2006: UNIR NM boycotts the general elections
