= Lives-sur-Meuse =

Sub-municipality of the city of Namur, Belgium

Lives-sur-Meuse Live (Walloon)
- Sub-municipality of Namur
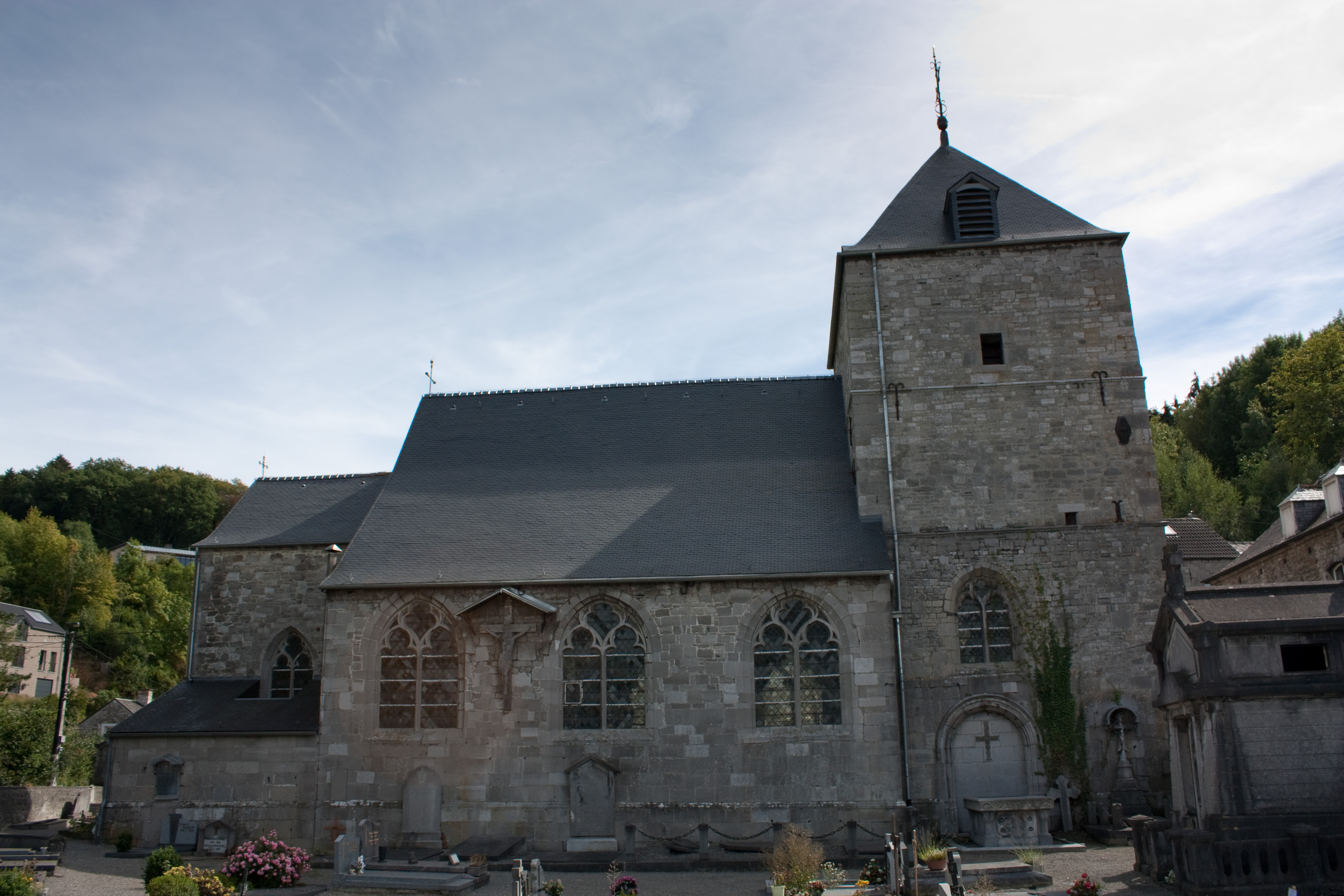
- Saint-Quentin Church

- Location of Lives-sur-Meuse in Namur
- Interactive map of Lives-sur-Meuse
- Location within Belgium Location within Namur Province
- Coordinates: 50°28′34″N 4°56′55″E
- Country: Belgium
- Community: French Community
- Region: Wallonia
- Province: Namur
- Arrondissement: Namur
- Municipality: Namur

Area
  - Total: 3.33 km^{2} (1.29 sq mi)

Population (2020-01-01)
  - Total: 476
  - Density: 143/km^{2} (370/sq mi)
- Postal codes: 5101
- Area codes: 081

Lives-sur-Meuse (French pronunciation: [liv syʁ møz], literally Lives on Meuse; Walloon: Live) is a sub-municipality of the city of Namur located in the province of Namur, Wallonia, Belgium. It was a separate municipality until 1977. On 1 January 1977, it was merged into Namur.
