= Joseph Droeven =

Congolese soldier

- Born: 20 November 1896
- Died: 1 January 1945 (aged 48)
- Buried: 50.7126°N 4.5152°E
- Allegiance: Belgian Army
- Service years: 1913–1914

Joseph Droeven (1896–1945) was a Congolese soldier for the Belgian Army during the First World War and first person of African descent in the Belgian Army.

== Early life ==
Joseph Droeven was the son of Florent-Jean-Mathieu Droeven, a Belgian colonial and gunsmith born in Tongeren, and Congolese woman named Chiacot. Florent first arrived in the Congo Free State on 6 May 1895. He fought against military mutineers during the Batetela rebellion in Luluabourg (current-day Kananga) in 1895. Florent acknowledged Joseph as his child, which was uncommon at the time, and took his child with him to Belgium when he returned. When Florent moved back to the Congo, Joseph stayed with his family in Herstal. In January 1910, Florent was murdered in Mangai, Congo.

== Career in the army ==
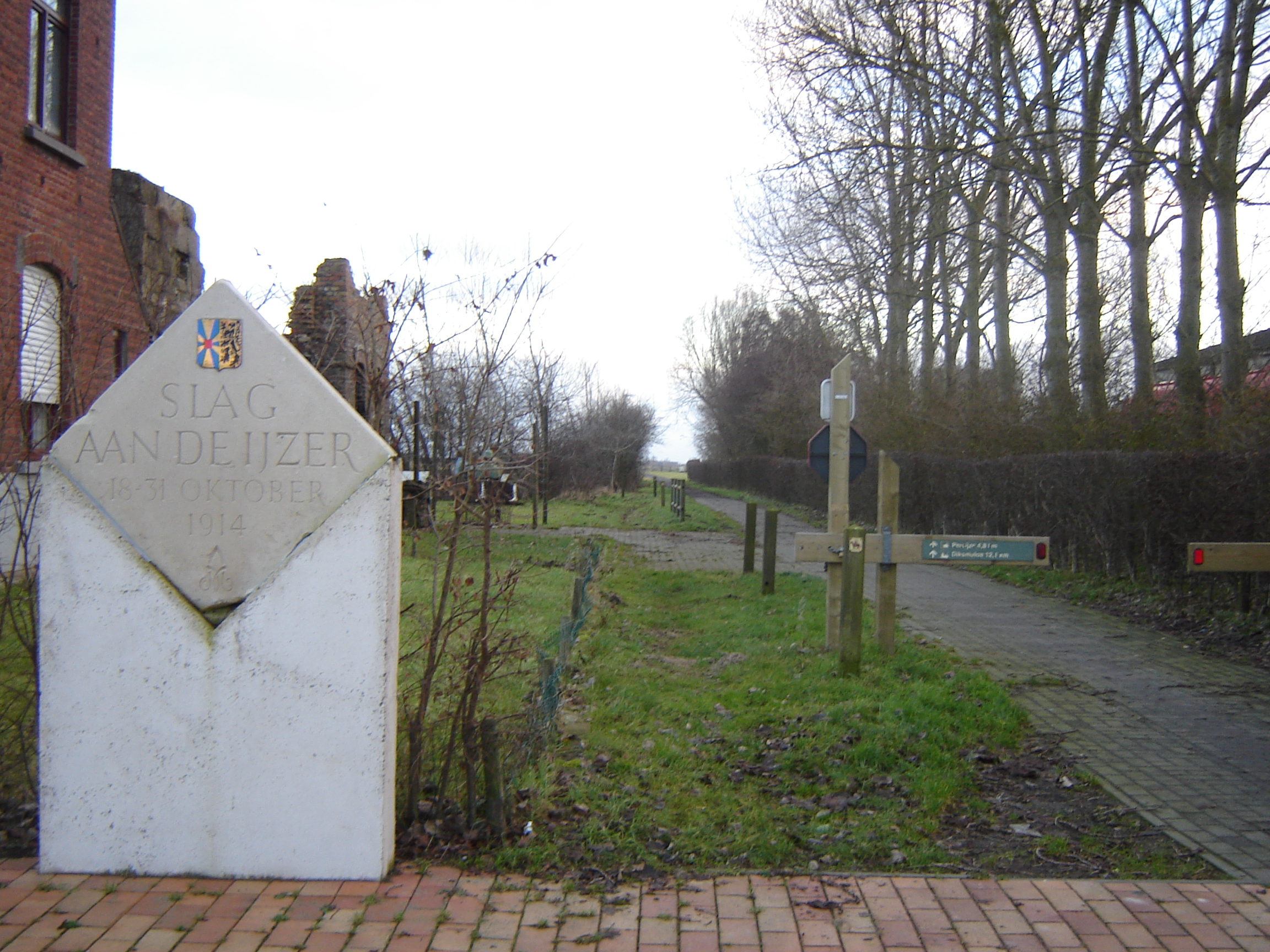
Monument of the Battle of the Yser at Ramskapelle station.

Joseph Droeven was schooled in Belgium. Out of the at least thirty-two Congolese soldiers of the Belgian Army during the First World War, Joseph Droeven was the only one who was a professional soldier instead of an army volunteer. Since his father acknowledged him, he was a Belgian as well. He was enlisted as a professional volunteer at the grenadier regiment since 1913. He became a corporal and, as such, some white Belgian soldiers were under his command.

Droeven's first military action during the First World War took place during the siege of Antwerp towards the end of September 1914. In October, he followed his regiment towards the Yser river. During the Battle of the Yser in October 1914, he fought at Ramskapelle near Nieuwpoort. When he had to go to the war front at Pervijze, however, he deserted and fled to France.

== Later life ==
Droeven was arrested as late as 1918 in Paris. At the court-martial, he cited hunger, the noise of the canons, and the failure of white Belgians to obey his orders as the reasons for his desertion. After the war, he led a normal family life. He is buried at the cemetery of Bourgeois in Rixensart.
