= Eala Botanical Garden =

Garden in the Democratic Republic of the Congo

- Location within Democratic Republic of the Congo
- Location: Democratic Republic of the Congo
- Nearest city: Mbandaka
- Coordinates: 0.0580°N 18.3141°E
- Website: lejardindeala.wordpress.com

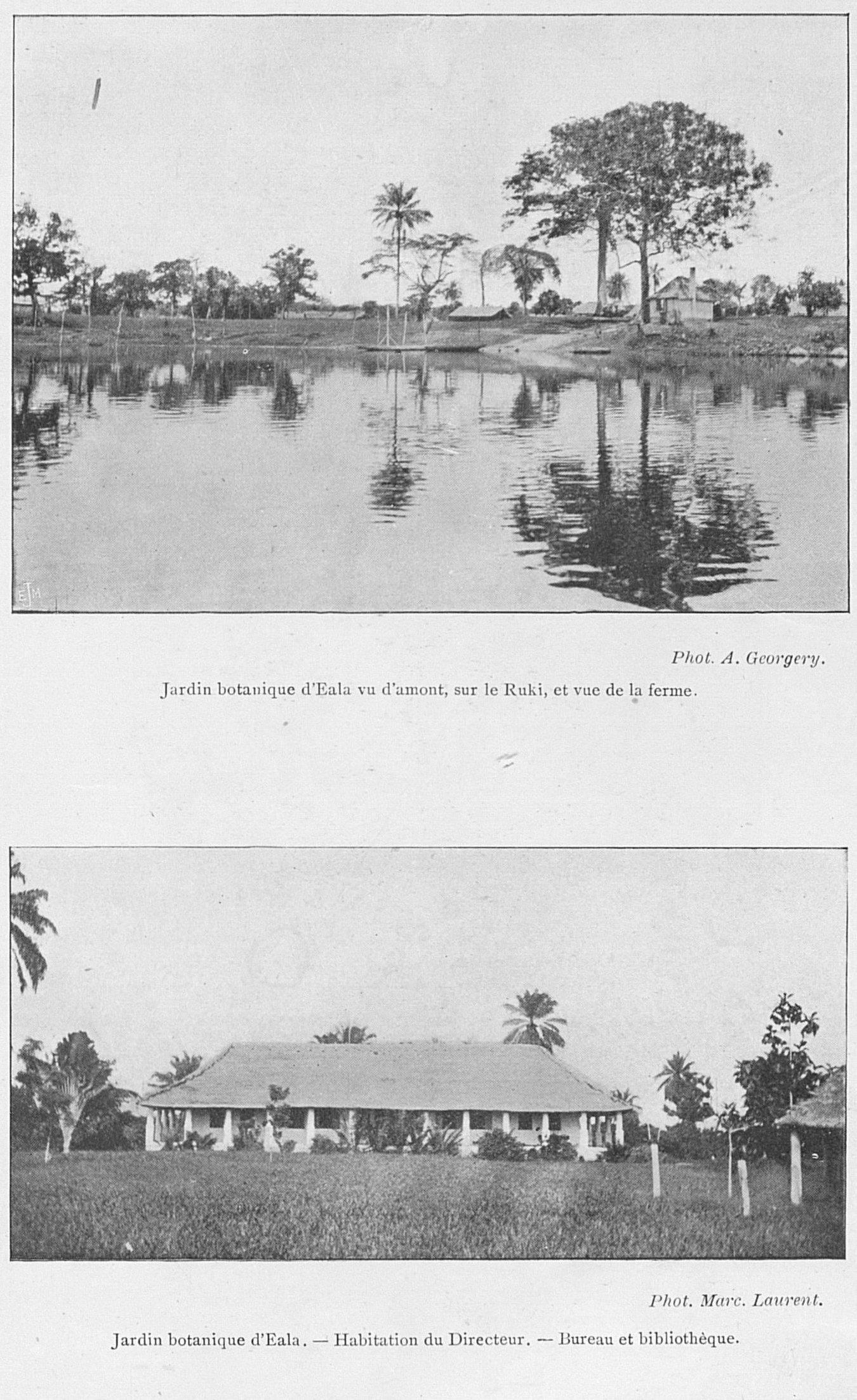
Eala Botanical Garden around 1903-1904

The Eala Botanical Garden (French: Jardin botanique d'Eala) is a botanical garden in Mbandaka in the Democratic Republic of the Congo.

== Location ==
The Eala Botanical Garden is just east of the city of Mbandaka, the capital of Équateur Province. The site covers 371 hectares (920 acres), and is 7 kilometres (4.3 mi) from Mbandaka. It is on the left (south) bank of the Ruki River just above its confluence with the Congo River.

== History ==
The garden was originally called Bokoto. It was created through the efforts of Émile-Ghislain Laurent of the Faculté Universitaire des Sciences Agronomiques de Gembloux. Laurent was a Belgian botanist and naturalist. He was employed by the Congo Free State of King Leopold II of Belgium. It was inaugurated on 2 February 1900 to make an inventory of the flora of the region and to study its potential for agriculture. Due to its size, location and biological diversity Eala was considered one of the most important of the world's tropical gardens.

The garden covered 371 hectares (920 acres) of primary forest, swamp forest and savanna. The main purpose became trials of exotic species of plants and trees introduced to Africa, particularly those with economic potential. There were about 7,760 samples in its herbarium, and it had many exotic fruit trees such as mangosteen, rambutan and Brazil nut. In 1908 the garden published its first catalog of plants and seeds for exchange or sale. A model farm was established to promote breeding of certain livestock suitable to the climate. In 1958 King Leopold III of Belgium inaugurated a zoological and botanical museum.

Until the early 1970s the garden sent samples of tropical species to Belgian and Italian laboratories. From 1974 under the policy of Zairianisation the garden declined due to lack of funding and fell into disuse. In 1977 some specimens from the Mbandaka Zoo were transferred to the garden. During the war of 1997–2000 it was occupied and looted by Zimbabwean and Rwandan troops. Since then the government has struggled to obtain funding to restore the garden.

== Today ==
Today the Eala Botanical Garden has almost 3,200 species of trees and herbaceous plants used for food or medicine. Its plants include the Arboretum, the Rocaille, the Palmetum and stands of conifers and rubber tree clones. Little has survived of the museum's collection. As of 2022 one crocodile in a small enclosure was the last of the zoo animals. The European Union's ECOFAC program has been sponsoring renovation of the garden since 2009 with the goal of reviving its research activity and its role in raising environmental awareness.

== Sources ==
- "Eala Botanical Garden", Petit Futé
- Historique (in French), Jardin botanique d'Eala, 28 July 2015
- "Jardin Botanique d'Eala", JSTOR
- "Way: Jardin botanique d'Eala (48471281)", OpenStreetMap
