= Maurice Beeli =

Belgian mycologist (1879-1957)

Maurice Philippe Gaspard Beeli (21 October 1879, St-Gilles-lez-Bruxelles – 17 March 1957) was a Belgian mycologist.

For more than thirty years, being encouraged by Émile De Wildeman and Walter Robyns, successive directors of the National Botanic Garden of Belgium, he collaborated on collections of fungi native to Belgium and the Belgian Congo. Although regarded as a pioneer of Congolese mycology, he never travelled to Africa.

Between 1920 and 1940, he published nearly 30 works about African mushrooms that were kept at the botanical garden, with 11 of the articles being printed in the journal "Fungi Goossensiani". He initiated work on the "Flore iconographique des champignons du Congo", precursor to the "Flore illustrée des champignons d’Afrique centrale", a major regional work.

As a taxonomist, he circumscribed the genus Meliolinopsis (synonym Meliolaster).

== Partial bibliography ==
- (1920). Note sur le genre Meliola Fr. Éspèces et variétés nouvelles récoltées au Congo. Essai d’un synopsis genéral des Meliola, rangées d’aprés les caractères anatomiques et d’apres les hôtes, suivi d’une liste de toutes les éspèces décrites à cè Jour. Bulletin du Jardin Botanique de l’État à Bruxelles 7 (1): 89–160.
- (1922). Notes mycologiques. 1. Contribution à la flore mycologique du Congo. Bulletin du Jardin Botanique de l’État à Bruxelles 8 (1): 1-22.
- (1923). Notes mycologiques. Champignons nouveaux pour la flore Belge, récoltés de 1915 a 1923. Bulletin de la Société de Botanique de Belgique 56: 57–68, 4 plates.
- (1926). Contribution nouvelle à l’étude de la flore mycologique du Congo. Bulletin de la Société Royale Botanique de Belgique 58 (2): 203–215, tabs 15–16.
- (1940). Notes mycologiques Congolaises. Champignons recoltés dans la région du Kiva par F.L. Hendrickx, mycologue à l’Ineec. Bulletin du Jardin Botanique de l’État à Bruxelles 16: 105–107.

== See also ==
- List of mycologists
